= Nova Belém =

- Municipality
- Location in Brazil
- Coordinates: 18°28′30″S 41°1′1″W
- Country: Brazil
- Region: Southeast
- State: Minas Gerais
- Mesoregion: Vale do Rio Doce

Population (2022 Census)
  - Total: 3,151
  - Estimate (2025): 3,126
- Time zone: UTC−3 (BRT)

Nova Belém is a municipality in the state of Minas Gerais in the Southeast region of Brazil.

== See also ==
- List of municipalities in Minas Gerais
