= Materlândia =

Coordinates: 18°51′S 39°59′W

- Municipality
- Interactive map of Materlândia
- Country: Brazil
- Region: Southeast
- State: Minas Gerais
- Mesoregion: Vale do Rio Doce

Population (2022 Census =)
  - Total: 3,963
  - Estimate (2025): 3,949
- Time zone: UTC−3 (BRT)

Materlândia is a municipality in the state of Minas Gerais in the Southeast region of Brazil.

== See also ==
- List of municipalities in Minas Gerais
