= Goiabeira, Minas Gerais =

Human settlement in Brazil

Coordinates: 18°58′55″S 41°13′22″W

- Municipality
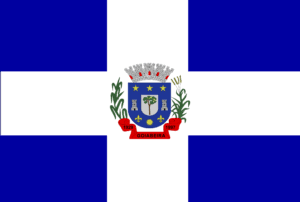
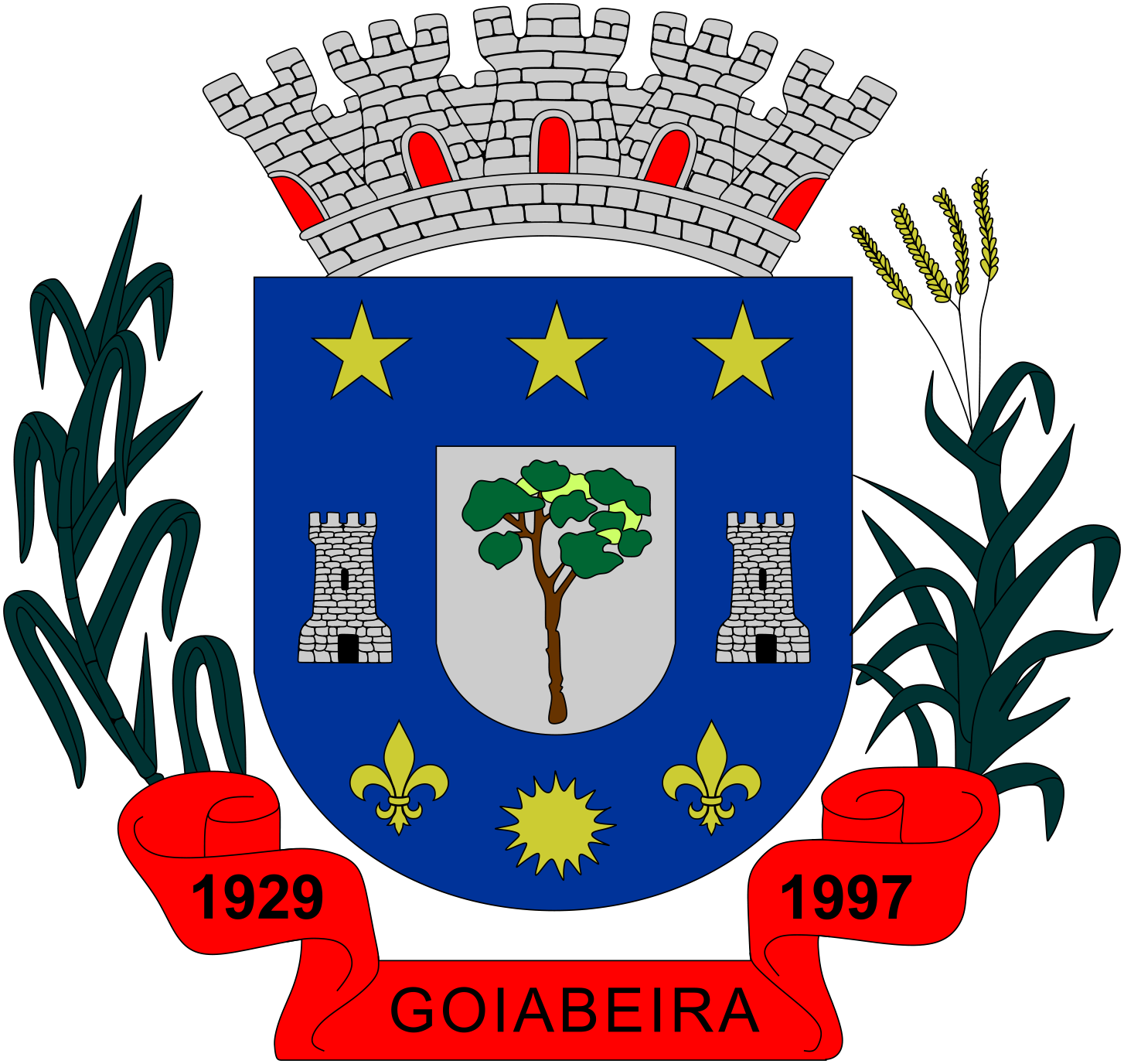
- Flag Coat of arms
- Interactive map of Goiabeira, Minas Gerais
- Country: Brazil
- State: Minas Gerais
- Region: Southeast

Population (2022 Census)
  - Total: 2,830
  - Estimate (2025): 2,859
- Time zone: UTC−3 (BRT)

Location of Goiabeira

Goiabeira is a municipality in the state of Minas Gerais in the Southeast region of Brazil. As of 2025, its estimated population was 2,859.

== See also ==
- List of municipalities in Minas Gerais
