= Oratórios =

Municipality of Minas Gerais, Brazil

Coordinates: 20°26′S 42°48′W

- Municipality
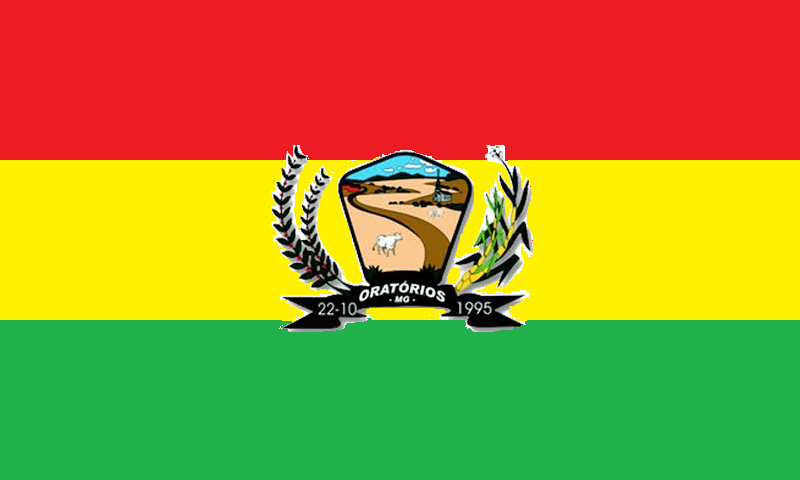
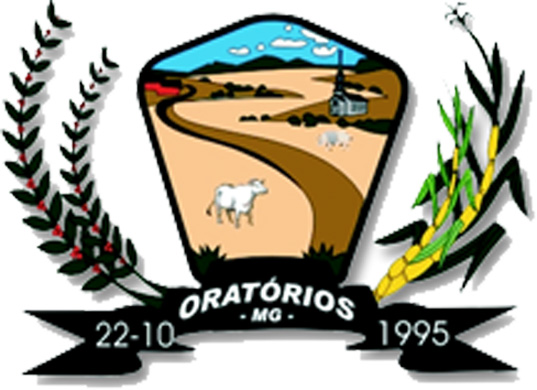
- Flag Coat of arms
- Interactive map of Oratórios
- Country: Brazil
- State: Minas Gerais
- Region: Southeast
- Time zone: UTC−3 (BRT)

Location of Oratórios within Minas Gerais

Oratórios is a municipality in the state of Minas Gerais, Brazil. The city belongs to the mesoregion of Zona da Mata and to the microregion of Ponte Nova. As of 2020, the estimated population was 4,663.

== See also ==
- List of municipalities in Minas Gerais
