= Urucânia =

Brazilian municipality located in the state of Minas Gerais

Coordinates: 20°22′S 42°45′W

- Municipality
- Interactive map of Urucânia
- Country: Brazil
- State: Minas Gerais
- Region: Southeast
- Time zone: UTC−3 (BRT)

Location of Urucânia within Minas Gerais

Urucânia is a Brazilian municipality located in the state of Minas Gerais. The city belongs to the mesoregion of Zona da Mata and to the microregion of Ponte Nova. As of 2020, the estimated population was 10,345.

== See also ==
- List of municipalities in Minas Gerais
