= São Sebastião do Rio Verde =

- Municipality
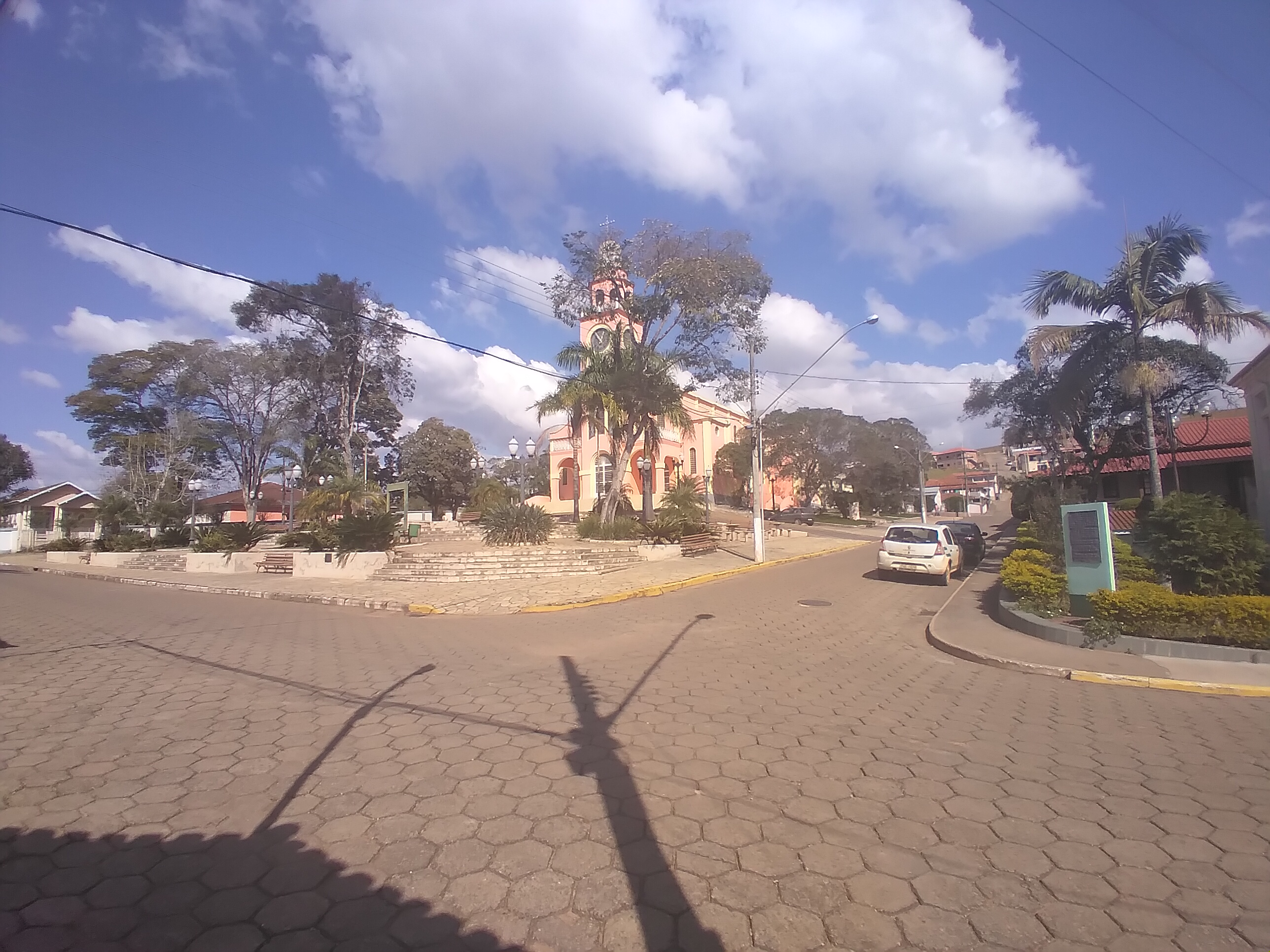
- The city's central square, in the background, the parish church.

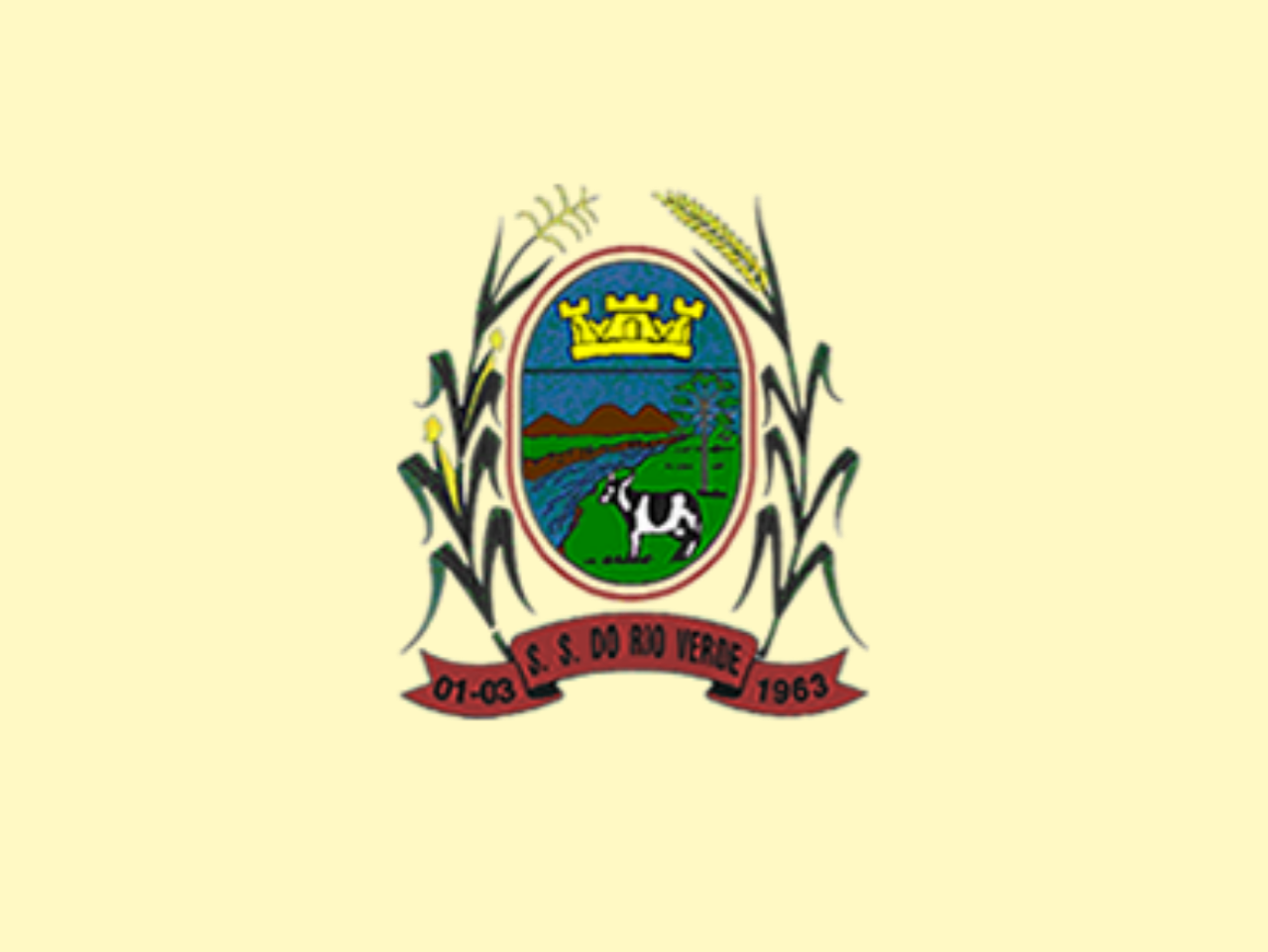
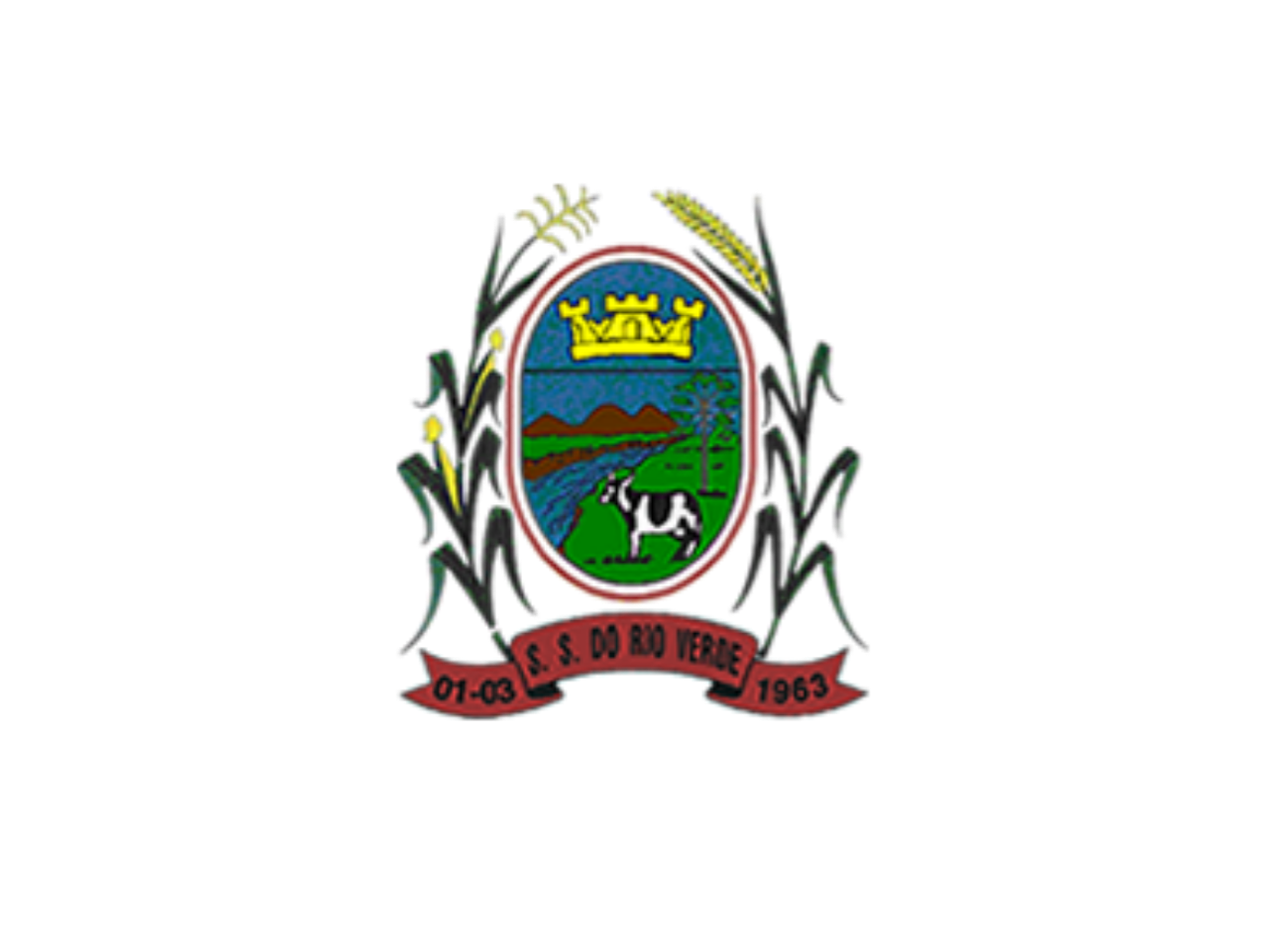
- Flag Coat of arms
- Nickname: "Your Little Big Friend."
- Location in State of Minas Gerais

- Location in Brazil
- Coordinates: 22°13′4″S 44°58′33″W
- Country: Brazil
- Region: Southeast
- State: Minas Gerais
- Mesoregion: South/South-west of Minas Gerais
- Established: January 1, 2017

Government
  - Mayor: Sandro Lisboa Martins

Area
  - Total: 35,480 sq mi (91,893 km^{2})

Population (2020)
  - Total: 2,250
- Time zone: UTC−3 (BRT)

São Sebastião do Rio Verde is a municipality in the state of Minas Gerais in the Southeast region of Brazil.

== See also ==
- List of municipalities in Minas Gerais
