= Luisburgo =

Brazilian municipality located in the state of Minas Gerais

Coordinates: 20°26′24″S 42°06′10″W

- Municipality
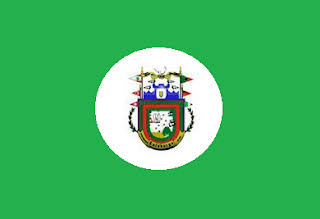
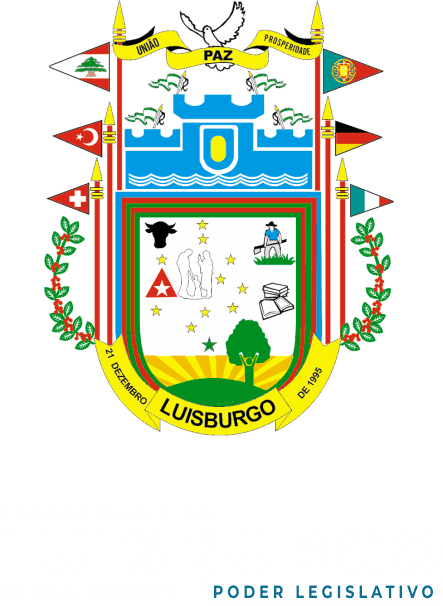
- Flag Coat of arms
- Interactive map of Luisburgo
- Country: Brazil
- State: Minas Gerais
- Region: Southeast
- Time zone: UTC−3 (BRT)

Location of Luisburgo within Minas Gerais

Luisburgo is a Brazilian municipality located in the state of Minas Gerais. The city belongs to the mesoregion of Zona da Mata and to the microregion of Manhuaçu. As of 2020, the estimated population was 6,258.

== See also ==
- List of municipalities in Minas Gerais
