= Dona Eusébia =

Coordinates: 21°18′S 42°48′W

Dona Euzébia
- Municipality
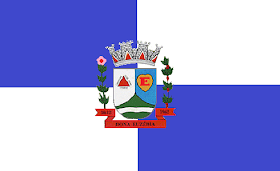
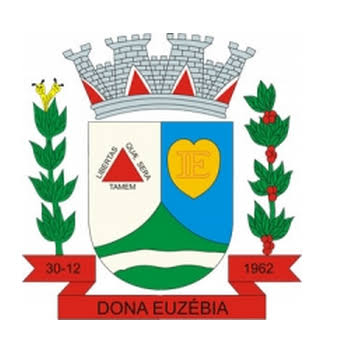
- Flag Coat of arms
- Interactive map of Dona Euzébia
- Country: Brazil
- Region: Southeast
- State: Minas Gerais
- Mesoregion: Vale do Rio Doce

Population (2020)
  - Total: 6,619
- Time zone: UTC−3 (BRT)

Dona Eusébia is a municipality in the state of Minas Gerais in the Southeast region of Brazil.

== See also ==
- List of municipalities in Minas Gerais
