= José Raydan =

Coordinates: 18.2189°S 42.4989°W

- Municipality
- Interactive map of José Raydan
- Country: Brazil
- Region: Southeast
- State: Minas Gerais
- Mesoregion: Vale do Rio Doce

Government
  - Mayor: Elias Godinho (PSDB)

Population (2022 Census)
  - Total: 4,268
  - Estimate (2025): 4,349
- Time zone: UTC−3 (BRT)

José Raydan is a municipality in the state of Minas Gerais in the Southeast region of Brazil.

== See also ==
- List of municipalities in Minas Gerais
