= Piedade de Ponte Nova =

Brazilian municipality located in the state of Minas Gerais

Coordinates: 20°14′42″S 42°44′02″W

- Municipality
- Interactive map of Piedade de Ponte Nova
- Country: Brazil
- State: Minas Gerais
- Region: Southeast
- Time zone: UTC−3 (BRT)

Location of Piedade de Ponte Nova within Minas Gerais

Piedade de Ponte Nova is a Brazilian municipality located in the state of Minas Gerais. The city belongs to the mesoregion of Zona da Mata and to the microregion of Ponte Nova. As of 2020, the estimated population was 4,140.

== See also ==
- List of municipalities in Minas Gerais
