= Ibitiúra de Minas =

- Municipality
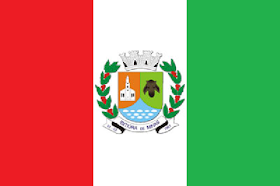
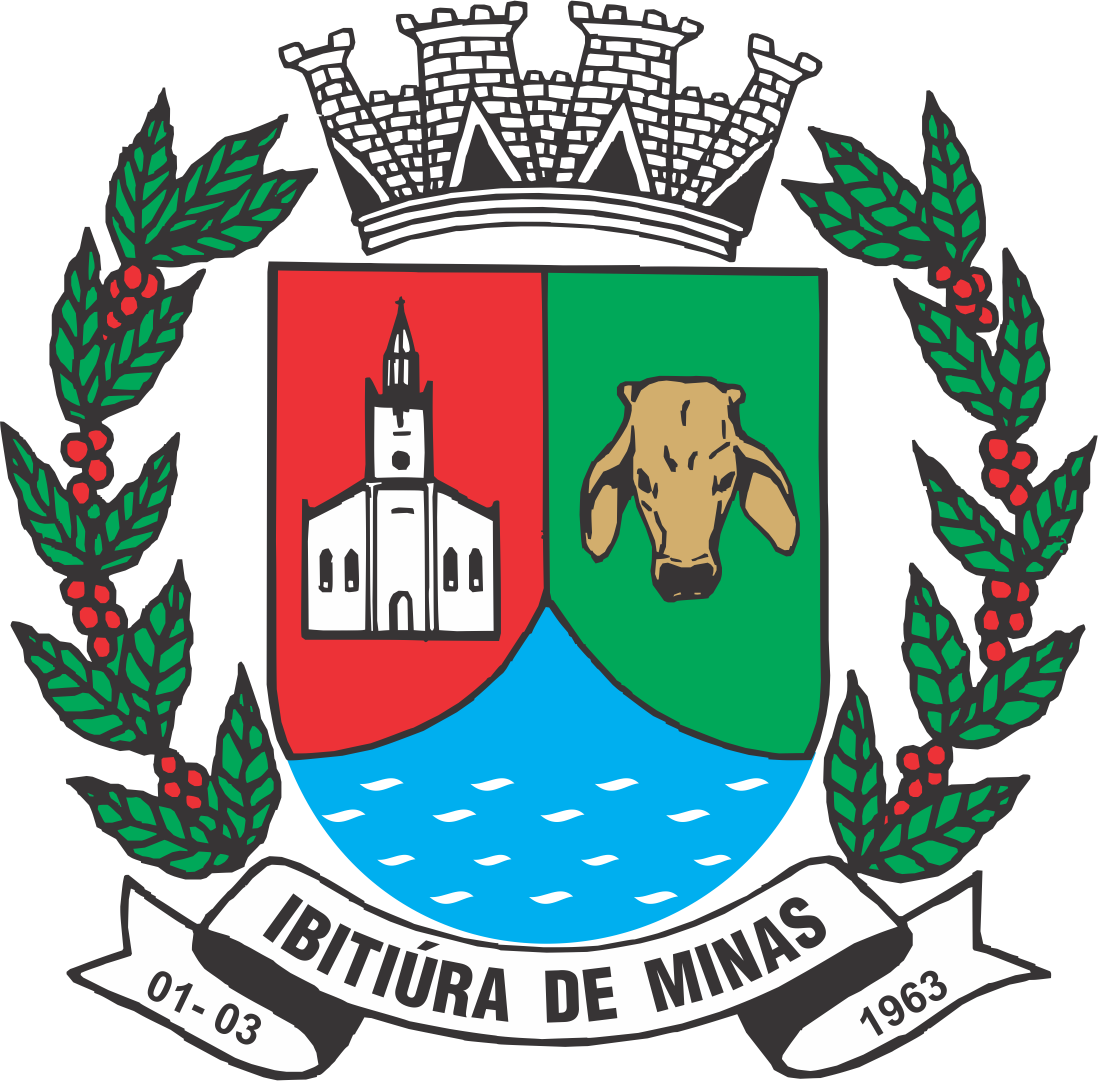
- Flag Coat of arms

- Location in Brazil
- Coordinates: 22°03′39″S 46°26′24″W
- Country: Brazil
- Region: Southeast
- State: Minas Gerais
- Mesoregion: Sudoeste de Minas

Population (2020)
  - Total: 3,492
- Time zone: UTC−3 (BRT)

Ibitiúra de Minas is a municipality in the state of Minas Gerais in the Southeast region of Brazil.Its estimated population in 2020 was 3,492 inhabitants.

== History ==
One of the few cities with such a well-registered beginning, there are documents dated from 100 years before the settlement of its population. It's a small and calm city located in the mountainous region of the south of Minas Gerais.

The municipality was created at 1962 and the first man to populate the city was Veríssimo João de Carvalho, in 1759.

== See also ==
- List of municipalities in Minas Gerais
- Andradas
