= Taparuba =

Coordinates: 19°45′S 41°37′W

- Municipality
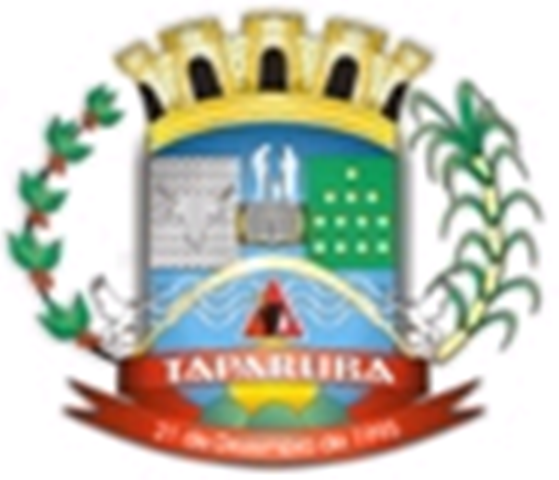
- Coat of arms
- Interactive map of Taparuba
- Country: Brazil
- Region: Southeast
- State: Minas Gerais
- Mesoregion: Vale do Rio Doce

Population (2020)
  - Total: 3,101
- Time zone: UTC−3 (BRT)

Taparuba is a municipality in the state of Minas Gerais in the Southeast region of Brazil.

== See also ==
- List of municipalities in Minas Gerais
