= Crucilândia =

Crucilândia Crucilândia
- Municipality
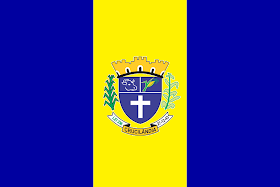
- Flag Coat of arms

- Location in Brazil
- Coordinates: 20°23′2″S 44°20′13″W
- Country: Brazil
- Region: Southeast
- State: Minas Gerais
- Mesoregion: Metropolitana de Belo Horizonte

Area
  - Total: 166.451 km^{2} (64.267 sq mi)
- Elevation: 799 m (2,621 ft)

Population (2022 Census)
  - Total: 5,434
  - Estimate (2025): 5,674
- Time zone: UTC−3 (BRT)
- Postal code: 35478-000
- Area code: (31)

Crucilândia is a municipality in the Brazilian state of Minas Gerais, located within the Metropolitan Mesoregion of Belo Horizonte and the Mid-Center-West Microregion. It lies approximately 97 kilometers from the state capital and covers an area of 167.58 square kilometers. According to the 2022 census, the municipality has a population of 5,674 inhabitants.

Situated in a region of rolling hills, Crucilândia has an average elevation of 908 meters and is crossed by several watercourses belonging to the Paraopeba River sub-basin. The municipality features a highland tropical climate, characterized by rainy summers and dry winters.

Politically emancipated in 1948, the city traces its origins to early exploratory expeditions known as bandeiras, and underwent several name changes over time until adopting its current name in 1943, in reference to its patron saint, the Holy Cross (Santa Cruz). With a strong rural and religious identity, Crucilândia preserves its cultural traditions and is noted for its natural landscapes, popular festivals, and agricultural activities.

== Name ==
The name Crucilândia is a hybrid toponym, formed by the Latin term cruci (cross) and the Germanic suffix lândia (land), meaning "land of the cross." The name directly references the locality's earlier designation, Santa Cruz das Águas Claras, a tribute to the cross erected by the first Portuguese settlers on the banks of a clear-water stream.

Over time, the settlement received several different names. Among the earliest were Campo das Flores, attributed to the initial formation of the village in the 19th century, and Gambá, a popular and somewhat pejorative nickname referencing the behavior of some of the first inhabitants. In 1880, when the village was elevated to the status of Distrito de Paz (Peace District), it was officially named Santa Cruz das Águas Claras, under the jurisdiction of the municipality of Bonfim. Later, it was renamed Santa Cruz de Dom Silvério (1910), Dom Silvério (1923), and Dom Silvério do Bonfim (1938), the latter adopted to distinguish it from another municipality in Minas Gerais with the same name.

The adoption of the current name, Crucilândia, was made official through State Decree-Law No. 1,058, dated December 31, 1943. The name was chosen to reaffirm the town’s religious identity and to honor its patron saint, the Holy Cross. Other name proposals at the time included Campina Verde and Entrocamento, but Crucilândia prevailed due to its strong historical and symbolic resonance with the community.

== History ==
The origins of Crucilândia date back to the period of exploratory expeditions (bandeiras) in the interior of Minas Gerais. One of the most well-known versions links its founding to the passage of Fernão Dias Paes Leme’s expedition around 1674, which is said to have traveled through the region toward Sumidouro. Two members of that expedition, Portuguese settlers from Alcobaça, are believed to have settled along the banks of a clear-water stream, where they erected a cross, giving rise to the settlement of Santa Cruz das Águas Claras.

Another similar version suggests that in the early 19th century, two men from an expedition heading toward the interior of Goiás decided to remain in the area, drawn by the landscape, the purity of the waters, and the presence of gold in the streambed. At that time, the small village was made up of only a few houses and had as its religious landmark the construction of the first chapel in 1860, built by the landowner Manoel Caetano Pereira. The area attracted farmers, muleteers, and merchants, many of whom left descendants in the municipality.

Administratively, the settlement was elevated to the status of Distrito de Paz (Peace District) in 1880, under the name Santa Cruz das Águas Claras, and was subordinate to the municipality of Bonfim. Over the following decades, the district underwent a series of name changes, including Santa Cruz de Dom Silvério (1910), Dom Silvério (1923), and Dom Silvério do Bonfim (1938), until adopting the name Crucilândia in 1943, when it became a vila (village) within Bonfim.

The political and administrative emancipation of Crucilândia was formalized by State Law No. 336 on December 27, 1948, and the new municipality was officially established on January 1, 1949. The first mayor, initially appointed by the state, was Mr. Moacir Flores. Later that same year, Crucilândia held its first municipal election, in which Ronan Gumercindo de Souza was elected as the municipality’s first popularly chosen mayor.

== Recent history ==
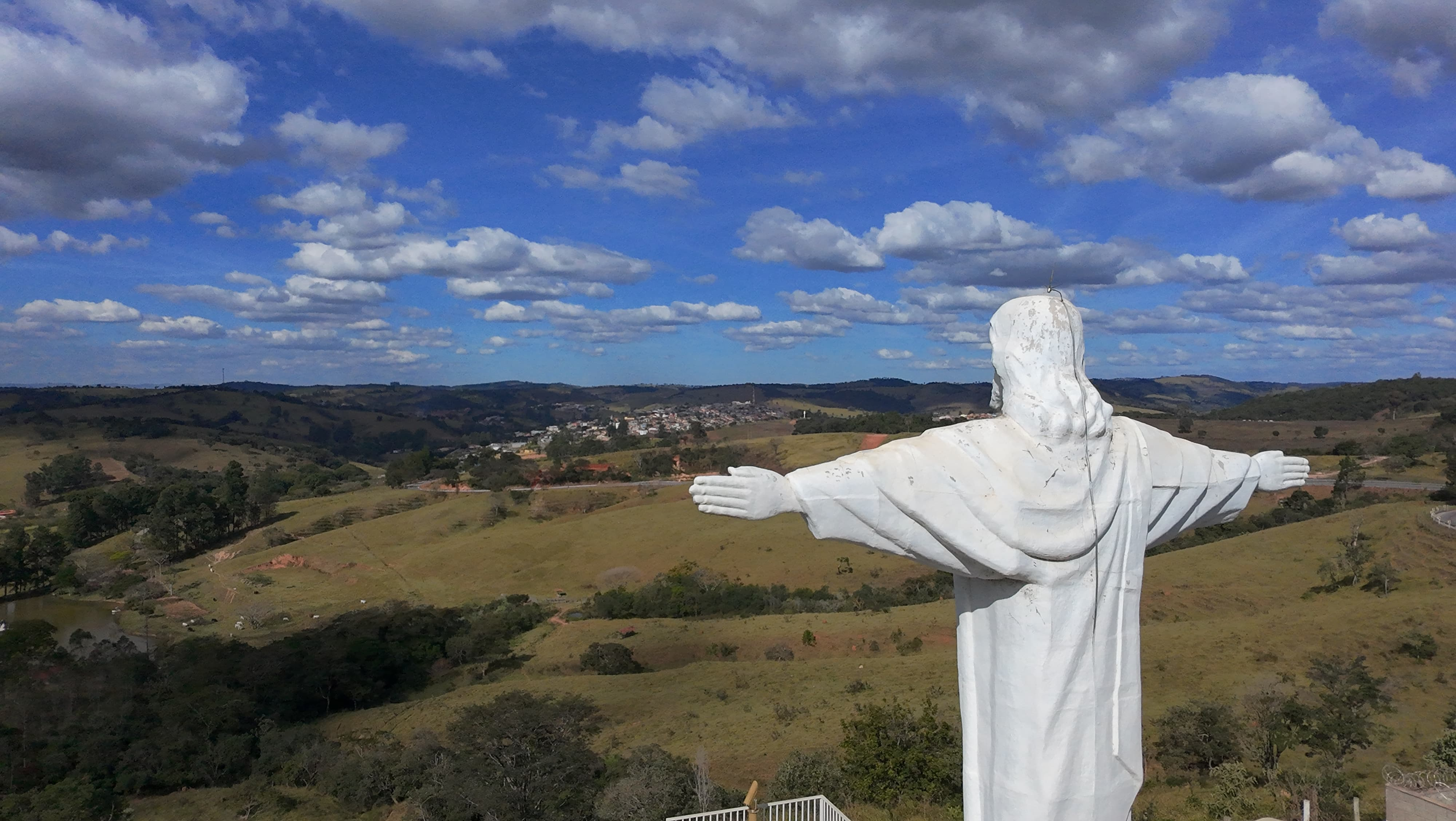
Image of the Christ statue at the "Sinhô Coelho" viewpoint

Since the 2000s, Crucilândia has undergone significant improvements in its infrastructure, with investments in road systems across both urban and rural areas, as well as the expansion of health and education services. The municipality has also promoted the preservation of its historical and religious heritage by supporting local events and restoring culturally significant sites.

Local tourism has gained prominence through the promotion of natural attractions such as waterfalls, hiking trails, and scenic rural landscapes. Notable initiatives include the weekly farmers’ markets held on Sundays in front of Darcy Ribeiro Municipal School, which help strengthen the local economy. The Festa do Peão Boiadeiro (Rodeo Festival), the Encontro de Carros de Bois (Ox Cart Parade), and horseback rides (cavalgadas) have become traditional events that attract visitors from across the region.

In terms of popular culture, Crucilândia has maintained and strengthened traditional expressions such as the Folia de Reis, June festivals (festas juninas), and the celebration of Dia da Santa Cruz (Day of the Holy Cross). These events reinforce community bonds and preserve the municipality's rural and religious identity, reflecting a balance between modernization and respect for tradition.

== Geography ==
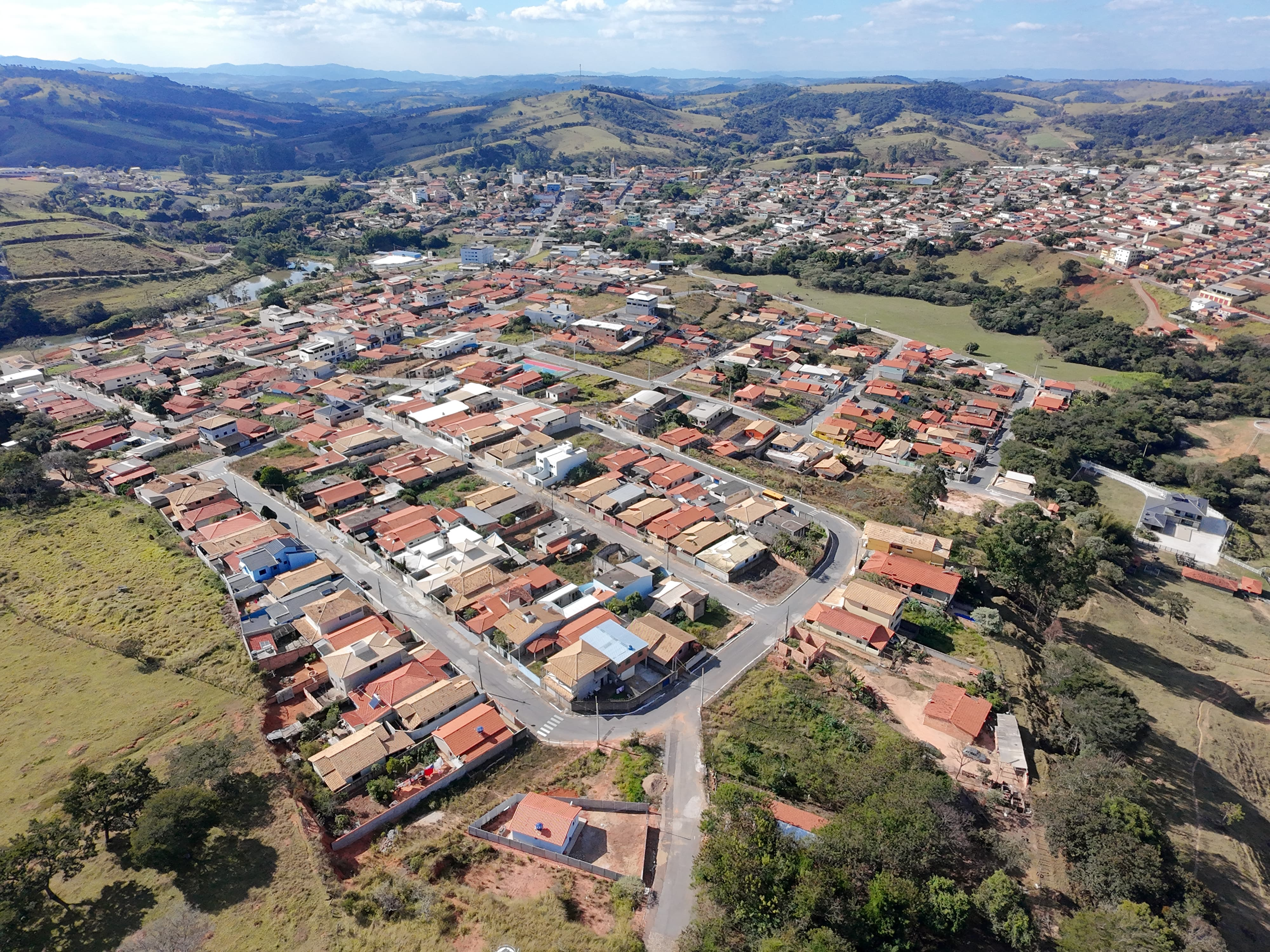
Aerial view of the city of Crucilândia

Crucilândia is located in the Metropolitan Mesoregion of Belo Horizonte and is part of the Mid-Center-West Microregion of Minas Gerais. The municipality covers an area of 167.58 square kilometers and shares borders with the municipalities of Bonfim, Itaguara, Piracema, Rio Manso, and Piedade dos Gerais. The municipal seat lies at an average elevation of 908 meters, with altitudes ranging from 873 meters—at the confluence of the Ribeirão da Areia and the Rio Manso—to 1,214 meters at the border between the municipalities of Itaguara and Piracema.

The predominant terrain is hilly, featuring convex and concave hillsides and narrow valleys shaped by fluvial dissection over granitic and gneissic rock formations. The area has a dense hydrographic network and belongs to the Paraopeba River sub-basin. The most prominent watercourse is the Ribeirão das Águas Claras—also known as the Rio Manso—which originates near the border with Piracema and supplies the Serra Azul System that serves the metropolitan region.

The municipality is located at 20°23′35″ south latitude and 44°20′13″ west longitude, based on the reference point at the town's main church. Crucilândia is situated 97 km from Belo Horizonte and lies at approximate distances of 510 km from São Paulo, 540 km from Rio de Janeiro, and 845 km from Brasília. The main access roads to the capital are MG-040 and BR-381. The nearest airports are Pampulha (104 km) and Tancredo Neves/Confins International Airport (153 km), while the closest seaports include Rio de Janeiro and Angra dos Reis.

== Climate ==
Crucilândia has a highland tropical climate (Cwa) according to the Köppen climate classification, characterized by hot, rainy summers and mild, dry winters. The annual average temperature is 21.8 °C, with average highs of 28.7 °C and average lows of 15.8 °C. February is the warmest month, with an average temperature of 23.2 °C, while July is the coldest, averaging 18.2 °C.

The municipality receives an average annual rainfall of approximately 1,272 mm. Most of the precipitation occurs between October and March, accounting for about 86% of the total. From April to September, the climate becomes drier, with only 14% of the yearly rainfall recorded during this period.

== Religion ==
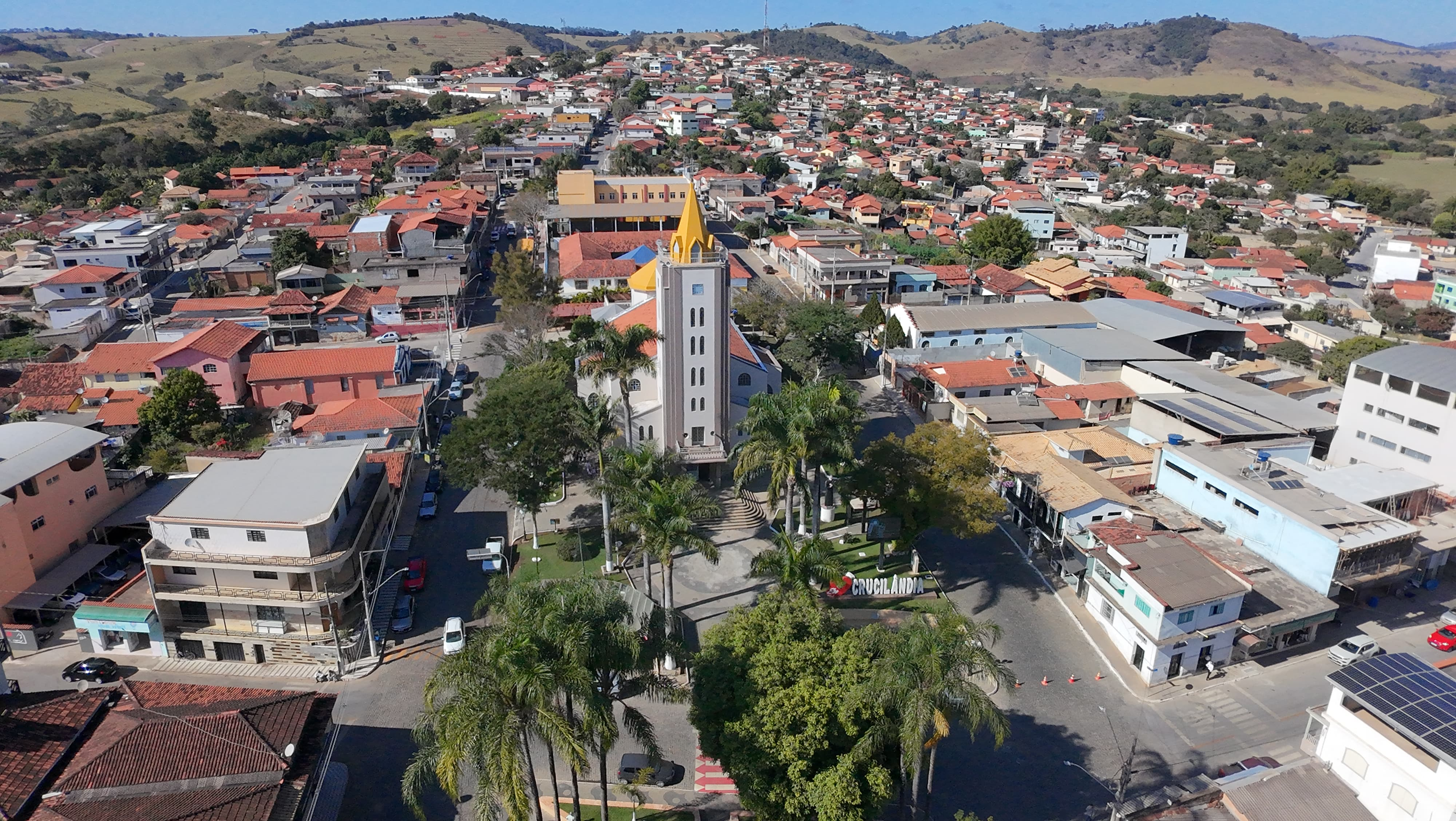
Aerial view of the Catholic Main Church of Crucilândia

Religion plays a central role in the cultural and social life of Crucilândia, with Catholicism being the predominant faith, inherited since the time of the town’s original formation as a small settlement. The patron saint of the municipality is the Holy Cross (Santa Cruz), whose feast is celebrated annually on May 3rd, drawing the faithful for Masses, processions, and popular festivities. Other significant religious observances include the Feast of Saint Gerard on October 16th and the Encontro de Folias de Reis, traditionally held in January and October, which brings together folkloric groups from across the region.

These religious events reflects long standing devotional traditions and remains central to the municipality’s communal identity.

== Politics ==
Crucilândia was politically emancipated on December 27, 1948, through State Law No. 336, and was officially established as a municipality on January 1, 1949. Initially, municipal administration was conducted by an appointed official, Mr. Moacir Flores, designated by the state government of Minas Gerais. In the same year, the first municipal election was held, electing Ronan Gumercindo de Souza as the first mayor chosen by popular vote, with pharmacist João Bartolozzi as vice mayor.

The Legislative Branch had been instituted earlier, on March 27, 1947, with Jove Gonçalves de Andrade taking office as the first president of the Municipal Council. Since its emancipation, the municipality has remained under the jurisdiction of the Judicial District (Comarca) of Bonfim.

== See also ==
- List of municipalities in Minas Gerais
