= Aguanil =

Town in the Brazilian state of Minas Gerais

Coordinates: 20°57′S 45°23′W

- Municipality
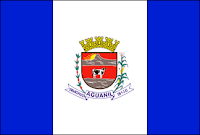
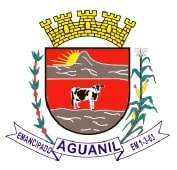
- Flag Coat of arms
- Interactive map of Aguanil
- Country: Brazil
- State: Minas Gerais
- Region: Southeast
- Time zone: UTC−3 (BRT)

Location of Aguanil

Aguanil is a municipality in the Brazilian state of Minas Gerais. It was founded on 30 December 1962 and, in 2020, its population was estimated to be 4,522.

== See also ==
- List of municipalities in Minas Gerais
