= Paulistas, Minas Gerais =

Coordinates: 18°25′37″S 42°52′04″W

Paulistas, Minas Gerais São Jose dos paulistas
- Municipality
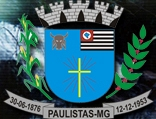
- Coat of arms
- Interactive map of Paulistas, Minas Gerais
- Country: Brazil
- Region: Southeast
- State: Minas Gerais
- Mesoregion: Vale do Rio Doce

Population (2022 Census)
  - Total: 4,389
  - Estimate (2025): 4,402
- Time zone: UTC−3 (BRT)

Paulistas, Minas Gerais is a municipality in the state of Minas Gerais in the Southeast region of Brazil.

== See also ==
- List of municipalities in Minas Gerais
