= Poço Fundo =

Coordinates: 21.7808°S 45.965°W

- Municipality
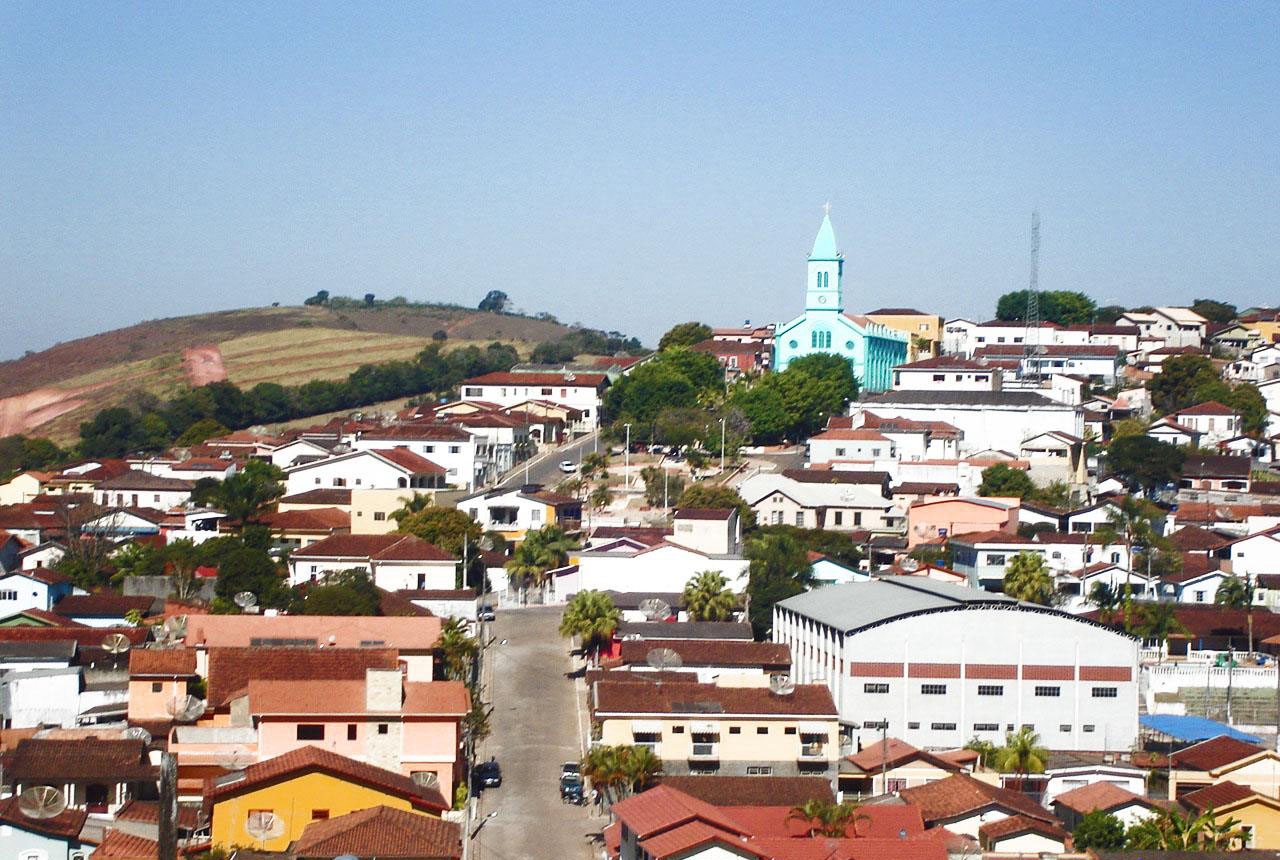
- Partial view of Poço Fundo

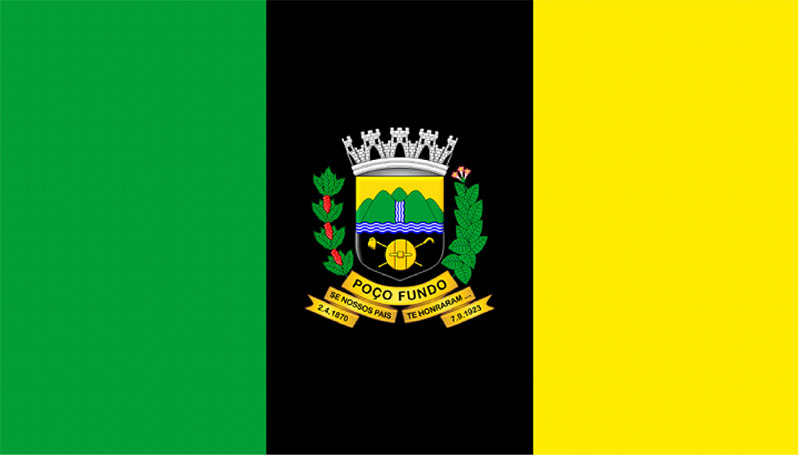
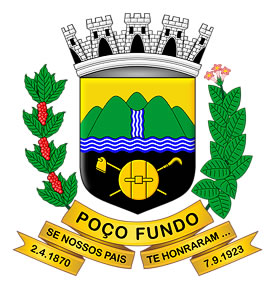
- Flag Coat of arms
- Interactive map of Poço Fundo
- Country: Brazil
- Region: Southeast
- State: Minas Gerais
- Mesoregion: Oeste de Minas
- Established: 474,244 km2

Government
  - Mayor: Renato Ferreira de Oliveira (PT)

Population (2020)
  - Total: 16,846
- Time zone: UTC−3 (BRT)

Poço Fundo is a municipality in the state of Minas Gerais in the Southeast region of Brazil.

== See also ==
- List of municipalities in Minas Gerais
