= Olímpio Noronha =

Coordinates: 22°04′S 45°16′W

- Municipality
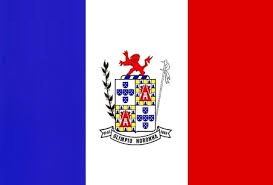
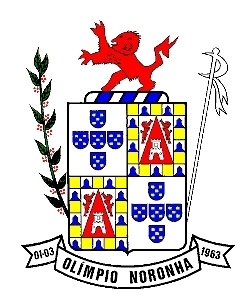
- Flag Coat of arms
- Interactive map of Olímpio Noronha
- Country: Brazil
- Region: Southeast
- State: Minas Gerais
- Mesoregion: Sul/Sudoeste de Minas

Population (2020)
  - Total: 2,809
- Time zone: UTC−3 (BRT)

Olímpio Noronha is a municipality in the state of Minas Gerais in the Southeast region of Brazil.

== See also ==
- List of municipalities in Minas Gerais
