= Tocos do Moji =

- Municipality
- Coat of arms

- Location in Minas Gerais state

- Location in Brazil
- Coordinates: 22°22′S 46°6′W
- Country: Brazil
- Region: Southeast
- State: Minas Gerais

Area
  - Total: 115 km^{2} (44 sq mi)
- Elevation: 1,050 m (3,440 ft)

Population (2020)
  - Total: 4,109
  - Density: 35.7/km^{2} (92.5/sq mi)
- Time zone: UTC−3 (BRT)

Tocos do Moji is a municipality in the state of Minas Gerais in Brazil. The population is 4,109 (2020 est.) in an area of 115 km^{2}.

== See also ==
- List of municipalities in Minas Gerais
