= Frei Lagonegro =

- Municipality
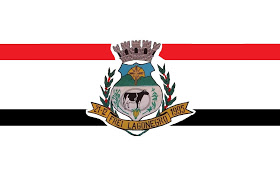
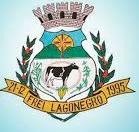
- Flag Coat of arms

- Location in Brazil
- Coordinates: 18°10′4″S 42°45′57″W
- Country: Brazil
- Region: Southeast
- State: Minas Gerais
- Mesoregion: Vale do Rio Doce

Population (2022 Census)
  - Total: 3,391
  - Estimate (2025): 3,481
- Time zone: UTC−3 (BRT)

Frei Lagonegro is a municipality in the state of Minas Gerais, located in the Southeast region of Brazil.

== See also ==
- List of municipalities in Minas Gerais
