= São José do Mantimento =

Brazilian municipality

Coordinates: 20°00′S 41°44′W

- Municipality
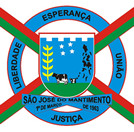
- Coat of arms
- Interactive map of São José do Mantimento
- Country: Brazil
- State: Minas Gerais
- Region: Southeast
- Time zone: UTC−3 (BRT)

Location of São José do Mantimento within Minas Gerais

São José do Mantimento is a Brazilian municipality located in the state of Minas Gerais. The city belongs to the mesoregion of Zona da Mata and to the microregion of Manhuaçu. As of 2020, the estimated population was 2,806.

== See also ==
- List of municipalities in Minas Gerais
