= List of municipalities in Minas Gerais =

Municipalities in Minas Gerais Municípios de Minas Gerais (Portuguese)
- Map of Minas Gerais of Brazil
- Category: Federated state
- Location: Brazil
- Number: 853 Municipalities
- Populations: 833 (Serra da Saudade) – 2,315,560 (Belo Horizonte)
- Areas: 3 km^{2} (1.2 sq mi) (Santa Cruz de Minas) – 10,727 km^{2} (4,142 sq mi) (João Pinheiro)

Minas Gerais (MG), a state of Brazil, is divided into 853 municipalities, which were, until 2017, grouped into 66 microregions, which were grouped into 12 mesoregions.

== List ==
Mesoregion	Microregion	Municipality	Population (2022)	Area (km²)
Campo das Vertentes	Barbacena	Alfredo Vasconcelos	6,931	130
Campo das Vertentes	Barbacena	Antônio Carlos	11,095	529
Campo das Vertentes	Barbacena	Barbacena	125,317	759
Campo das Vertentes	Barbacena	Barroso	20,080	82
Campo das Vertentes	Barbacena	Capela Nova	4,362	111
Campo das Vertentes	Barbacena	Caranaíba	2,933	159
Campo das Vertentes	Barbacena	Carandaí	23,812	487
Campo das Vertentes	Barbacena	Desterro do Melo	2,994	142
Campo das Vertentes	Barbacena	Ibertioga	5,198	346
Campo das Vertentes	Barbacena	Ressaquinha	4,548	183
Campo das Vertentes	Barbacena	Santa Bárbara do Tugúrio	4,208	194
Campo das Vertentes	Barbacena	Senhora dos Remédios	10,384	237
Campo das Vertentes	Lavras	Carrancas	4,049	727
Campo das Vertentes	Lavras	Ijaci	7,003	105
Campo das Vertentes	Lavras	Ingaí	2,580	305
Campo das Vertentes	Lavras	Itumirim	6,638	234
Campo das Vertentes	Lavras	Itutinga	4,217	372
Campo das Vertentes	Lavras	Lavras	104,761	564
Campo das Vertentes	Lavras	Luminárias	5,586	500
Campo das Vertentes	Lavras	Nepomuceno	25,018	582
Campo das Vertentes	Lavras	Ribeirão Vermelho	4,080	49
Campo das Vertentes	São João del Rei	Conceição da Barra de Minas	3,560	273
Campo das Vertentes	São João del Rei	Coronel Xavier Chaves	3,486	140
Campo das Vertentes	São João del Rei	Dores de Campos	10,007	124
Campo das Vertentes	São João del Rei	Lagoa Dourada	12,769	476
Campo das Vertentes	São João del Rei	Madre de Deus de Minas	5,191	492
Campo das Vertentes	São João del Rei	Nazareno	8,179	341
Campo das Vertentes	São João del Rei	Piedade do Rio Grande	4,604	322
Campo das Vertentes	São João del Rei	Prados	9,048	264
Campo das Vertentes	São João del Rei	Resende Costa	11,230	618
Campo das Vertentes	São João del Rei	Ritápolis	4,994	404
Campo das Vertentes	São João del Rei	Santa Cruz de Minas	8,109	3
Campo das Vertentes	São João del Rei	Santana do Garambéu	2,137	203
Campo das Vertentes	São João del Rei	São João del Rei	90,225	1452
Campo das Vertentes	São João del Rei	São Tiago	11,192	572
Campo das Vertentes	São João del Rei	Tiradentes	7,744	83
Central Mineira	Bom Despacho	Araújos	9,199	245
Central Mineira	Bom Despacho	Bom Despacho	51,737	1,213
Central Mineira	Bom Despacho	Dores do Indaiá	12,630	1,111
Central Mineira	Bom Despacho	Estrela do Indaiá	2,772	635
Central Mineira	Bom Despacho	Japaraíba	4,506	172
Central Mineira	Bom Despacho	Lagoa da Prata	51,412	439
Central Mineira	Bom Despacho	Leandro Ferreira	199	352
Central Mineira	Bom Despacho	Luz	17,875	1,172
Central Mineira	Bom Despacho	Martinho Campos	14,003	1,058
Central Mineira	Bom Despacho	Moema	7,548	203
Central Mineira	Bom Despacho	Quartel Geral	3,179	556
Central Mineira	Bom Despacho	Serra da Saudade	833	335
Central Mineira	Curvelo	Augusto de Lima		
Central Mineira	Curvelo	Buenópolis		
Central Mineira	Curvelo	Corinto		
Central Mineira	Curvelo	Curvelo		
Central Mineira	Curvelo	Felixlândia		
Central Mineira	Curvelo	Inimutaba		
Central Mineira	Curvelo	Joaquim Felício		
Central Mineira	Curvelo	Monjolos		
Central Mineira	Curvelo	Morro da Garça		
Central Mineira	Curvelo	Presidente Juscelino		
Central Mineira	Curvelo	Santo Hipólito		
Central Mineira	Três Marias	Abaeté		
Central Mineira	Três Marias	Biquinhas		
Central Mineira	Três Marias	Cedro do Abaeté		
Central Mineira	Três Marias	Morada Nova de Minas		
Central Mineira	Três Marias	Paineiras		
Central Mineira	Três Marias	Pompéu		
Central Mineira	Três Marias	Três Marias		
Jequitinhonha	Almenara	Almenara		
Jequitinhonha	Almenara	Bandeira		
Jequitinhonha	Almenara	Divisópolis		
Jequitinhonha	Almenara	Felisburgo		
Jequitinhonha	Almenara	Jacinto		
Jequitinhonha	Almenara	Jequitinhonha		
Jequitinhonha	Almenara	Joaíma		
Jequitinhonha	Almenara	Jordânia		
Jequitinhonha	Almenara	Mata Verde		
Jequitinhonha	Almenara	Monte Formoso		
Jequitinhonha	Almenara	Palmópolis		
Jequitinhonha	Almenara	Rio do Prado		
Jequitinhonha	Almenara	Rubim		
Jequitinhonha	Almenara	Salto da Divisa		
Jequitinhonha	Almenara	Santa Maria do Salto		
Jequitinhonha	Almenara	Santo Antônio do Jacinto		
Jequitinhonha	Araçuaí	Araçuaí	34,297	2236
Jequitinhonha	Araçuaí	Caraí	19,548	1242
Jequitinhonha	Araçuaí	Coronel Murta	8,200	815
Jequitinhonha	Araçuaí	Itinga	13,745	1649
Jequitinhonha	Araçuaí	Novo Cruzeiro	26,975	1702
Jequitinhonha	Araçuaí	Padre Paraíso	17,334	544
Jequitinhonha	Araçuaí	Ponto dos Volantes	10,883	1212
Jequitinhonha	Araçuaí	Virgem da Lapa	11,804	868
Jequitinhonha	Capelinha	Angelândia		
Jequitinhonha	Capelinha	Aricanduva		
Jequitinhonha	Capelinha	Berilo		
Jequitinhonha	Capelinha	Capelinha		
Jequitinhonha	Capelinha	Carbonita		
Jequitinhonha	Capelinha	Chapada do Norte		
Jequitinhonha	Capelinha	Francisco Badaró		
Jequitinhonha	Capelinha	Itamarandiba		
Jequitinhonha	Capelinha	Jenipapo de Minas		
Jequitinhonha	Capelinha	José Gonçalves de Minas		
Jequitinhonha	Capelinha	Leme do Prado		
Jequitinhonha	Capelinha	Minas Novas		
Jequitinhonha	Capelinha	Turmalina		
Jequitinhonha	Capelinha	Veredinha		
Jequitinhonha	Diamantina	Couto de Magalhaes de Minas		
Jequitinhonha	Diamantina	Datas		
Jequitinhonha	Diamantina	Diamantina		
Jequitinhonha	Diamantina	Felício dos Santos		
Jequitinhonha	Diamantina	Gouveia		
Jequitinhonha	Diamantina	Presidente Kubitschek		
Jequitinhonha	Diamantina	São Gonçalo do Rio Preto		
Jequitinhonha	Diamantina	Senador Modestino Gonçalves		
Jequitinhonha	Pedra Azul	Cachoeira de Pajeú	9,110	695
Jequitinhonha	Pedra Azul	Comercinho	6,660	654
Jequitinhonha	Pedra Azul	Itaobim	19,151	679
Jequitinhonha	Pedra Azul	Medina	20,156	1435
Jequitinhonha	Pedra Azul	Pedra Azul	24,410	1594
Metropolitana de Belo Horizonte	Belo Horizonte	Belo Horizonte (State Capital)	2,315,560	331
Metropolitana de Belo Horizonte	Belo Horizonte	Betim	411,846	344
Metropolitana de Belo Horizonte	Belo Horizonte	Brumadinho	38,915	639
Metropolitana de Belo Horizonte	Belo Horizonte	Caeté	38,776	542
Metropolitana de Belo Horizonte	Belo Horizonte	Confins	7,350	42
Metropolitana de Belo Horizonte	Belo Horizonte	Contagem	621,863	194
Metropolitana de Belo Horizonte	Belo Horizonte	Esmeraldas	85,598	909
Metropolitana de Belo Horizonte	Belo Horizonte	Ibirité	170,537	72
Metropolitana de Belo Horizonte	Belo Horizonte	Igarapé	45,847	111
Metropolitana de Belo Horizonte	Belo Horizonte	Juatuba	30,716	97
Metropolitana de Belo Horizonte	Belo Horizonte	Lagoa Santa	75,145	229
Metropolitana de Belo Horizonte	Belo Horizonte	Mário Campos	15,900	35
Metropolitana de Belo Horizonte	Belo Horizonte	Mateus Leme	37,841	302
Metropolitana de Belo Horizonte	Belo Horizonte	Nova Lima	111,697	429
Metropolitana de Belo Horizonte	Belo Horizonte	Pedro Leopoldo	62,580	292
Metropolitana de Belo Horizonte	Belo Horizonte	Raposos	16,279	72
Metropolitana de Belo Horizonte	Belo Horizonte	Ribeirão das Neves	329,794	155
Metropolitana de Belo Horizonte	Belo Horizonte	Rio Acima	10,261	228
Metropolitana de Belo Horizonte	Belo Horizonte	Sabará	129,380	302
Metropolitana de Belo Horizonte	Belo Horizonte	Santa Luzia	219,132	235
Metropolitana de Belo Horizonte	Belo Horizonte	São Joaquim de Bicas	34,348	71
Metropolitana de Belo Horizonte	Belo Horizonte	São José da Lapa	26,090	48
Metropolitana de Belo Horizonte	Belo Horizonte	Sarzedo	36,844	62
Metropolitana de Belo Horizonte	Belo Horizonte	Vespasiano	129,246	70
Metropolitana de Belo Horizonte	Conceição do Mato Dentro	Alvorada de Minas		
Metropolitana de Belo Horizonte	Conceição do Mato Dentro	Conceição do Mato Dentro		
Metropolitana de Belo Horizonte	Conceição do Mato Dentro	Congonhas do Norte		
Metropolitana de Belo Horizonte	Conceição do Mato Dentro	Dom Joaquim		
Metropolitana de Belo Horizonte	Conceição do Mato Dentro	Itambé do Mato Dentro		
Metropolitana de Belo Horizonte	Conceição do Mato Dentro	Morro do Pilar		
Metropolitana de Belo Horizonte	Conceição do Mato Dentro	Passabém		
Metropolitana de Belo Horizonte	Conceição do Mato Dentro	Rio Vermelho		
Metropolitana de Belo Horizonte	Conceição do Mato Dentro	Santo Antônio do Itambé		
Metropolitana de Belo Horizonte	Conceição do Mato Dentro	Santo Antônio do Rio Abaixo		
Metropolitana de Belo Horizonte	Conceição do Mato Dentro	São Sebastião do Rio Preto		
Metropolitana de Belo Horizonte	Conceição do Mato Dentro	Serra Azul de Minas		
Metropolitana de Belo Horizonte	Conceição do Mato Dentro	Serro		
Metropolitana de Belo Horizonte	Conselheiro Lafaiete	Casa Grande	2,214	157
Metropolitana de Belo Horizonte	Conselheiro Lafaiete	Catas Altas da Noruega	3,110	141
Metropolitana de Belo Horizonte	Conselheiro Lafaiete	Congonhas	52,890	304
Metropolitana de Belo Horizonte	Conselheiro Lafaiete	Conselheiro Lafaiete	131,621	370
Metropolitana de Belo Horizonte	Conselheiro Lafaiete	Cristiano Otoni	4,667	132
Metropolitana de Belo Horizonte	Conselheiro Lafaiete	Desterro de Entre Rios	7,653	377
Metropolitana de Belo Horizonte	Conselheiro Lafaiete	Entre Rios de Minas	14,746	456
Metropolitana de Belo Horizonte	Conselheiro Lafaiete	Itaverava	5,642	284
Metropolitana de Belo Horizonte	Conselheiro Lafaiete	Ouro Branco	38,724	258
Metropolitana de Belo Horizonte	Conselheiro Lafaiete	Queluzito	1,770	153
Metropolitana de Belo Horizonte	Conselheiro Lafaiete	Santana dos Montes	3,469	196
Metropolitana de Belo Horizonte	Conselheiro Lafaiete	São Brás do Suaçuí	3,989	110
Metropolitana de Belo Horizonte	Itabira	Alvinópolis		
Metropolitana de Belo Horizonte	Itabira	Barão de Cocais		
Metropolitana de Belo Horizonte	Itabira	Bela Vista de Minas		
Metropolitana de Belo Horizonte	Itabira	Bom Jesus do Amparo		
Metropolitana de Belo Horizonte	Itabira	Catas Altas		
Metropolitana de Belo Horizonte	Itabira	Dionísio		
Metropolitana de Belo Horizonte	Itabira	Ferros		
Metropolitana de Belo Horizonte	Itabira	Itabira		
Metropolitana de Belo Horizonte	Itabira	João Monlevade		
Metropolitana de Belo Horizonte	Itabira	Nova Era		
Metropolitana de Belo Horizonte	Itabira	Nova União		
Metropolitana de Belo Horizonte	Itabira	Rio Piracicaba		
Metropolitana de Belo Horizonte	Itabira	Santa Bárbara		
Metropolitana de Belo Horizonte	Itabira	Santa Maria de Itabira		
Metropolitana de Belo Horizonte	Itabira	São Domingos do Prata		
Metropolitana de Belo Horizonte	Itabira	São Gonçalo do Rio Abaixo		
Metropolitana de Belo Horizonte	Itabira	São José do Goiabal		
Metropolitana de Belo Horizonte	Itabira	Taquaraçu de Minas		
Metropolitana de Belo Horizonte	Itaguara	Belo Vale		
Metropolitana de Belo Horizonte	Itaguara	Bonfim		
Metropolitana de Belo Horizonte	Itaguara	Crucilândia		
Metropolitana de Belo Horizonte	Itaguara	Itaguara		
Metropolitana de Belo Horizonte	Itaguara	Itatiaiuçu		
Metropolitana de Belo Horizonte	Itaguara	Jeceaba		
Metropolitana de Belo Horizonte	Itaguara	Moeda		
Metropolitana de Belo Horizonte	Itaguara	Piedade dos Gerais		
Metropolitana de Belo Horizonte	Itaguara	Rio Manso		
Metropolitana de Belo Horizonte	Ouro Preto	Diogo de Vasconcelos	3,549	165
Metropolitana de Belo Horizonte	Ouro Preto	Itabirito	53,365	544
Metropolitana de Belo Horizonte	Ouro Preto	Mariana	61,387	1194
Metropolitana de Belo Horizonte	Ouro Preto	Ouro Preto	74,821	1245
Metropolitana de Belo Horizonte	Pará de Minas	Florestal	8,045	194
Metropolitana de Belo Horizonte	Pará de Minas	Onça de Pitangui	2,969	246
Metropolitana de Belo Horizonte	Pará de Minas	Pará de Minas	97,139	551
Metropolitana de Belo Horizonte	Pará de Minas	Pitangui	26,685	569
Metropolitana de Belo Horizonte	Pará de Minas	São José da Varginha	4,536	205
Metropolitana de Belo Horizonte	Sete Lagoas	Araçaí		
Metropolitana de Belo Horizonte	Sete Lagoas	Baldim		
Metropolitana de Belo Horizonte	Sete Lagoas	Cachoeira da Prata		
Metropolitana de Belo Horizonte	Sete Lagoas	Caetanópolis		
Metropolitana de Belo Horizonte	Sete Lagoas	Capim Branco		
Metropolitana de Belo Horizonte	Sete Lagoas	Cordisburgo		
Metropolitana de Belo Horizonte	Sete Lagoas	Fortuna de Minas		
Metropolitana de Belo Horizonte	Sete Lagoas	Funilândia		
Metropolitana de Belo Horizonte	Sete Lagoas	Inhaúma		
Metropolitana de Belo Horizonte	Sete Lagoas	Jaboticatubas		
Metropolitana de Belo Horizonte	Sete Lagoas	Jequitibá		
Metropolitana de Belo Horizonte	Sete Lagoas	Maravilhas		
Metropolitana de Belo Horizonte	Sete Lagoas	Matozinhos		
Metropolitana de Belo Horizonte	Sete Lagoas	Papagaios		
Metropolitana de Belo Horizonte	Sete Lagoas	Paraopeba		
Metropolitana de Belo Horizonte	Sete Lagoas	Pequi		
Metropolitana de Belo Horizonte	Sete Lagoas	Prudente de Morais		
Metropolitana de Belo Horizonte	Sete Lagoas	Santana de Pirapama		
Metropolitana de Belo Horizonte	Sete Lagoas	Santana do Riacho		
Metropolitana de Belo Horizonte	Sete Lagoas	Sete Lagoas		
Noroeste de Minas	Paracatu	Brasilândia de Minas		
Noroeste de Minas	Paracatu	Guarda-Mor		
Noroeste de Minas	Paracatu	João Pinheiro		
Noroeste de Minas	Paracatu	Lagamar		
Noroeste de Minas	Paracatu	Lagoa Grande		
Noroeste de Minas	Paracatu	Paracatu		
Noroeste de Minas	Paracatu	Presidente Olegário		
Noroeste de Minas	Paracatu	São Gonçalo do Abaeté		
Noroeste de Minas	Paracatu	Varjão de Minas		
Noroeste de Minas	Paracatu	Vazante		
Noroeste de Minas	Unaí	Arinos	17,272	5279
Noroeste de Minas	Unaí	Bonfinópolis de Minas	5,528	1850
Noroeste de Minas	Unaí	Buritis	24,030	5225
Noroeste de Minas	Unaí	Cabeceira Grande	6,627	1033
Noroeste de Minas	Unaí	Dom Bosco	3,697	817
Noroeste de Minas	Unaí	Formoso	7,949	3686
Noroeste de Minas	Unaí	Natalândia	3,520	468
Noroeste de Minas	Unaí	Unaí	86,619	8445
Noroeste de Minas	Unaí	Uruana de Minas	3,282	598
Norte de Minas	Bocaiúva	Bocaiúva		
Norte de Minas	Bocaiúva	Engenheiro Navarro		
Norte de Minas	Bocaiúva	Francisco Dumont		
Norte de Minas	Bocaiúva	Guaraciama		
Norte de Minas	Bocaiúva	Olhos-d'Água		
Norte de Minas	Grão Mogol	Botumirim		
Norte de Minas	Grão Mogol	Cristália		
Norte de Minas	Grão Mogol	Grão Mogol		
Norte de Minas	Grão Mogol	Itacambira		
Norte de Minas	Grão Mogol	Josenópolis		
Norte de Minas	Grão Mogol	Padre Carvalho		
Norte de Minas	Janaúba	Catuti		
Norte de Minas	Janaúba	Espinosa		
Norte de Minas	Janaúba	Gameleiras		
Norte de Minas	Janaúba	Jaíba		
Norte de Minas	Janaúba	Janaúba		
Norte de Minas	Janaúba	Mamonas		
Norte de Minas	Janaúba	Mato Verde		
Norte de Minas	Janaúba	Monte Azul		
Norte de Minas	Janaúba	Nova Porteirinha		
Norte de Minas	Janaúba	Pai Pedro		
Norte de Minas	Janaúba	Porteirinha		
Norte de Minas	Janaúba	Riacho dos Machados		
Norte de Minas	Janaúba	Serranópolis de Minas		
Norte de Minas	Januária	Bonito de Minas		
Norte de Minas	Januária	Chapada Gaúcha		
Norte de Minas	Januária	Cônego Marinho		
Norte de Minas	Januária	Icaraí de Minas		
Norte de Minas	Januária	Itacarambi		
Norte de Minas	Januária	Januária		
Norte de Minas	Januária	Juvenília		
Norte de Minas	Januária	Manga		
Norte de Minas	Januária	Matias Cardoso		
Norte de Minas	Januária	Miravânia		
Norte de Minas	Januária	Montalvânia		
Norte de Minas	Januária	Pedras de Maria da Cruz		
Norte de Minas	Januária	Pintópolis		
Norte de Minas	Januária	São Francisco		
Norte de Minas	Januária	São João das Missões		
Norte de Minas	Januária	Urucuia		
Norte de Minas	Montes Claros	Brasília de Minas	32,025	1399
Norte de Minas	Montes Claros	Campo Azul	3,714	505
Norte de Minas	Montes Claros	Capitão Enéas	14,108	971
Norte de Minas	Montes Claros	Claro dos Poções	7,166	720
Norte de Minas	Montes Claros	Coração de Jesus	25,377	2225
Norte de Minas	Montes Claros	Francisco Sá	23,476	2747
Norte de Minas	Montes Claros	Glaucilândia	2,928	145
Norte de Minas	Montes Claros	Ibiracatu	5,081	353
Norte de Minas	Montes Claros	Japonvar	8,127	375
Norte de Minas	Montes Claros	Juramento	3,768	431
Norte de Minas	Montes Claros	Lontra	8,790	258
Norte de Minas	Montes Claros	Luislândia	6,210	411
Norte de Minas	Montes Claros	Mirabela	13,651	723
Norte de Minas	Montes Claros	Montes Claros	414,240	3589
Norte de Minas	Montes Claros	Patis	4,837	444
Norte de Minas	Montes Claros	Ponto Chique	3,747	602
Norte de Minas	Montes Claros	São João da Lagoa	4,822	998
Norte de Minas	Montes Claros	São João da Ponte	23,930	1851
Norte de Minas	Montes Claros	São João do Pacuí	3,972	415
Norte de Minas	Montes Claros	Ubaí	11,708	820
Norte de Minas	Montes Claros	Varzelândia	18,840	814
Norte de Minas	Montes Claros	Verdelândia	7,672	1570
Norte de Minas	Pirapora	Buritizeiro		
Norte de Minas	Pirapora	Ibiaí		
Norte de Minas	Pirapora	Jequitaí		
Norte de Minas	Pirapora	Lagoa dos Patos		
Norte de Minas	Pirapora	Lassance		
Norte de Minas	Pirapora	Pirapora		
Norte de Minas	Pirapora	Riachinho		
Norte de Minas	Pirapora	Santa Fé de Minas		
Norte de Minas	Pirapora	São Romão		
Norte de Minas	Pirapora	Várzea da Palma		
Norte de Minas	Salinas	Águas Vermelhas		
Norte de Minas	Salinas	Berizal		
Norte de Minas	Salinas	Curral de Dentro		
Norte de Minas	Salinas	Divisa Alegre		
Norte de Minas	Salinas	Fruta de Leite		
Norte de Minas	Salinas	Indaiabira		
Norte de Minas	Salinas	Montezuma		
Norte de Minas	Salinas	Ninheira		
Norte de Minas	Salinas	Novorizonte		
Norte de Minas	Salinas	Rio Pardo de Minas		
Norte de Minas	Salinas	Rubelita		
Norte de Minas	Salinas	Salinas		
Norte de Minas	Salinas	Santa Cruz de Salinas		
Norte de Minas	Salinas	Santo Antônio do Retiro		
Norte de Minas	Salinas	São João do Paraíso		
Norte de Minas	Salinas	Taiobeiras		
Norte de Minas	Salinas	Vargem Grande do Rio Pardo		
Oeste de Minas	Campo Belo	Aguanil		
Oeste de Minas	Campo Belo	Campo Belo		
Oeste de Minas	Campo Belo	Cana Verde		
Oeste de Minas	Campo Belo	Candeias		
Oeste de Minas	Campo Belo	Cristais		
Oeste de Minas	Campo Belo	Perdões		
Oeste de Minas	Campo Belo	Santana do Jacaré		
Oeste de Minas	Divinópolis	Carmo do Cajuru	23,479	455
Oeste de Minas	Divinópolis	Cláudio	30,159	630
Oeste de Minas	Divinópolis	Conceição do Pará	5,415	250
Oeste de Minas	Divinópolis	Divinópolis	231,091	708
Oeste de Minas	Divinópolis	Igaratinga	10,830	218
Oeste de Minas	Divinópolis	Itaúna	97,669	495
Oeste de Minas	Divinópolis	Nova Serrana	105,552	282
Oeste de Minas	Divinópolis	Perdigão	12,268	249
Oeste de Minas	Divinópolis	Santo Antônio do Monte	27,295	1125
Oeste de Minas	Divinópolis	São Gonçalo do Pará	11,770	265
Oeste de Minas	Divinópolis	São Sebastião do Oeste	8,815	408
Oeste de Minas	Formiga	Arcos		
Oeste de Minas	Formiga	Camacho		
Oeste de Minas	Formiga	Córrego Fundo		
Oeste de Minas	Formiga	Formiga		
Oeste de Minas	Formiga	Itapecerica		
Oeste de Minas	Formiga	Pains		
Oeste de Minas	Formiga	Pedra do Indaiá		
Oeste de Minas	Formiga	Pimenta		
Oeste de Minas	Oliveira	Bom Sucesso		
Oeste de Minas	Oliveira	Carmo da Mata		
Oeste de Minas	Oliveira	Carmópolis de Minas		
Oeste de Minas	Oliveira	Ibituruna		
Oeste de Minas	Oliveira	Oliveira		
Oeste de Minas	Oliveira	Passa Tempo		
Oeste de Minas	Oliveira	Piracema		
Oeste de Minas	Oliveira	Santo Antônio do Amparo		
Oeste de Minas	Oliveira	São Francisco de Paula		
Oeste de Minas	Piui	Bambuí		
Oeste de Minas	Piui	Córrego Danta		
Oeste de Minas	Piui	Doresópolis		
Oeste de Minas	Piui	Iguatama		
Oeste de Minas	Piui	Medeiros		
Oeste de Minas	Piui	Piumhi		
Oeste de Minas	Piui	São Roque de Minas		
Oeste de Minas	Piui	Tapiraí		
Oeste de Minas	Piui	Vargem Bonita		
Sul/Sudoeste de Minas	Alfenas	Alfenas		
Sul/Sudoeste de Minas	Alfenas	Alterosa		
Sul/Sudoeste de Minas	Alfenas	Areado		
Sul/Sudoeste de Minas	Alfenas	Carmo do Rio Claro		
Sul/Sudoeste de Minas	Alfenas	Carvalhópolis		
Sul/Sudoeste de Minas	Alfenas	Conceição da Aparecida		
Sul/Sudoeste de Minas	Alfenas	Divisa Nova		
Sul/Sudoeste de Minas	Alfenas	Fama		
Sul/Sudoeste de Minas	Alfenas	Machado		
Sul/Sudoeste de Minas	Alfenas	Paraguaçu		
Sul/Sudoeste de Minas	Alfenas	Poço Fundo		
Sul/Sudoeste de Minas	Alfenas	Serrania		
Sul/Sudoeste de Minas	Andrelândia	Aiuruoca		
Sul/Sudoeste de Minas	Andrelândia	Andrelândia		
Sul/Sudoeste de Minas	Andrelândia	Arantina		
Sul/Sudoeste de Minas	Andrelândia	Bocaina de Minas		
Sul/Sudoeste de Minas	Andrelândia	Bom Jardim de Minas		
Sul/Sudoeste de Minas	Andrelândia	Carvalhos		
Sul/Sudoeste de Minas	Andrelândia	Cruzília		
Sul/Sudoeste de Minas	Andrelândia	Liberdade		
Sul/Sudoeste de Minas	Andrelândia	Minduri		
Sul/Sudoeste de Minas	Andrelândia	Passa-Vinte		
Sul/Sudoeste de Minas	Andrelândia	São Vicente de Minas		
Sul/Sudoeste de Minas	Andrelândia	Seritinga		
Sul/Sudoeste de Minas	Andrelândia	Serranos		
Sul/Sudoeste de Minas	Itajubá	Brasópolis		
Sul/Sudoeste de Minas	Itajubá	Consolação		
Sul/Sudoeste de Minas	Itajubá	Cristina		
Sul/Sudoeste de Minas	Itajubá	Delfim Moreira		
Sul/Sudoeste de Minas	Itajubá	Dom Viçoso		
Sul/Sudoeste de Minas	Itajubá	Itajubá		
Sul/Sudoeste de Minas	Itajubá	Maria da Fé		
Sul/Sudoeste de Minas	Itajubá	Marmelópolis		
Sul/Sudoeste de Minas	Itajubá	Paraisópolis		
Sul/Sudoeste de Minas	Itajubá	Piranguçu		
Sul/Sudoeste de Minas	Itajubá	Piranguinho		
Sul/Sudoeste de Minas	Itajubá	Virgínia		
Sul/Sudoeste de Minas	Itajubá	Wenceslau Braz		
Sul/Sudoeste de Minas	Passos	Alpinópolis	18,300	460
Sul/Sudoeste de Minas	Passos	Bom Jesus da Penha	4,474	208
Sul/Sudoeste de Minas	Passos	Capetinga	6,562	297
Sul/Sudoeste de Minas	Passos	Capitólio	10,380	521
Sul/Sudoeste de Minas	Passos	Cássia	17,155	665
Sul/Sudoeste de Minas	Passos	Claraval	4,658	227
Sul/Sudoeste de Minas	Passos	Delfinópolis	8,393	1378
Sul/Sudoeste de Minas	Passos	Fortaleza de Minas	3,477	218
Sul/Sudoeste de Minas	Passos	Ibiraci	10,948	562
Sul/Sudoeste de Minas	Passos	Itaú de Minas	14,406	153
Sul/Sudoeste de Minas	Passos	Passos	111,939	1338
Sul/Sudoeste de Minas	Passos	Pratápolis	8,406	215
Sul/Sudoeste de Minas	Passos	São João Batista do Glória	7,652	547
Sul/Sudoeste de Minas	Passos	São José da Barra	7,793	308
Sul/Sudoeste de Minas	Poços de Caldas	Albertina	2,952	58
Sul/Sudoeste de Minas	Poços de Caldas	Andradas	40,553	469
Sul/Sudoeste de Minas	Poços de Caldas	Bandeira do Sul	5,943	47
Sul/Sudoeste de Minas	Poços de Caldas	Botelhos	14,828	334
Sul/Sudoeste de Minas	Poços de Caldas	Caldas	14,217	711
Sul/Sudoeste de Minas	Poços de Caldas	Campestre	20,696	577
Sul/Sudoeste de Minas	Poços de Caldas	Ibitiúra de Minas	3,365	68
Sul/Sudoeste de Minas	Poços de Caldas	Inconfidentes	7,301	149
Sul/Sudoeste de Minas	Poços de Caldas	Jacutinga	25,525	347
Sul/Sudoeste de Minas	Poços de Caldas	Monte Sião	24,089	291
Sul/Sudoeste de Minas	Poços de Caldas	Ouro Fino	32,094	533
Sul/Sudoeste de Minas	Poços de Caldas	Poços de Caldas	163,742	546
Sul/Sudoeste de Minas	Poços de Caldas	Santa Rita de Caldas	8,460	503
Sul/Sudoeste de Minas	Pouso Alegre	Bom Repouso		
Sul/Sudoeste de Minas	Pouso Alegre	Borda da Mata		
Sul/Sudoeste de Minas	Pouso Alegre	Bueno Brandão		
Sul/Sudoeste de Minas	Pouso Alegre	Camanducaia		
Sul/Sudoeste de Minas	Pouso Alegre	Cambuí		
Sul/Sudoeste de Minas	Pouso Alegre	Congonhal		
Sul/Sudoeste de Minas	Pouso Alegre	Córrego do Bom Jesus		
Sul/Sudoeste de Minas	Pouso Alegre	Espírito Santo do Dourado		
Sul/Sudoeste de Minas	Pouso Alegre	Estiva		
Sul/Sudoeste de Minas	Pouso Alegre	Extrema		
Sul/Sudoeste de Minas	Pouso Alegre	Gonçalves		
Sul/Sudoeste de Minas	Pouso Alegre	Ipuiúna		
Sul/Sudoeste de Minas	Pouso Alegre	Itapeva		
Sul/Sudoeste de Minas	Pouso Alegre	Munhoz		
Sul/Sudoeste de Minas	Pouso Alegre	Pouso Alegre		
Sul/Sudoeste de Minas	Pouso Alegre	Sapucaí-Mirim		
Sul/Sudoeste de Minas	Pouso Alegre	Senador Amaral		
Sul/Sudoeste de Minas	Pouso Alegre	Senador José Bento		
Sul/Sudoeste de Minas	Pouso Alegre	Tocos do Moji		
Sul/Sudoeste de Minas	Pouso Alegre	Toledo		
Sul/Sudoeste de Minas	Santa Rita do Sapucaí	Cachoeira de Minas		
Sul/Sudoeste de Minas	Santa Rita do Sapucaí	Careaçu		
Sul/Sudoeste de Minas	Santa Rita do Sapucaí	Conceição das Pedras		
Sul/Sudoeste de Minas	Santa Rita do Sapucaí	Conceição dos Ouros		
Sul/Sudoeste de Minas	Santa Rita do Sapucaí	Cordislândia		
Sul/Sudoeste de Minas	Santa Rita do Sapucaí	Heliodora		
Sul/Sudoeste de Minas	Santa Rita do Sapucaí	Natércia		
Sul/Sudoeste de Minas	Santa Rita do Sapucaí	Pedralva		
Sul/Sudoeste de Minas	Santa Rita do Sapucaí	Santa Rita do Sapucaí		
Sul/Sudoeste de Minas	Santa Rita do Sapucaí	São Gonçalo do Sapucaí		
Sul/Sudoeste de Minas	Santa Rita do Sapucaí	São João da Mata		
Sul/Sudoeste de Minas	Santa Rita do Sapucaí	São José do Alegre		
Sul/Sudoeste de Minas	Santa Rita do Sapucaí	São Sebastião da Bela Vista		
Sul/Sudoeste de Minas	Santa Rita do Sapucaí	Silvianópolis		
Sul/Sudoeste de Minas	Santa Rita do Sapucaí	Turvolândia		
Sul/Sudoeste de Minas	São Lourenço	Alagoa		
Sul/Sudoeste de Minas	São Lourenço	Baependi		
Sul/Sudoeste de Minas	São Lourenço	Cambuquira		
Sul/Sudoeste de Minas	São Lourenço	Carmo de Minas		
Sul/Sudoeste de Minas	São Lourenço	Caxambu		
Sul/Sudoeste de Minas	São Lourenço	Conceição do Rio Verde		
Sul/Sudoeste de Minas	São Lourenço	Itamonte		
Sul/Sudoeste de Minas	São Lourenço	Itanhandu		
Sul/Sudoeste de Minas	São Lourenço	Jesuânia		
Sul/Sudoeste de Minas	São Lourenço	Lambari		
Sul/Sudoeste de Minas	São Lourenço	Olímpio Noronha		
Sul/Sudoeste de Minas	São Lourenço	Passa Quatro		
Sul/Sudoeste de Minas	São Lourenço	Pouso Alto		
Sul/Sudoeste de Minas	São Lourenço	São Lourenço		
Sul/Sudoeste de Minas	São Lourenço	São Sebastião do Rio Verde		
Sul/Sudoeste de Minas	São Lourenço	Soledade de Minas		
Sul/Sudoeste de Minas	São Sebastiao do Paraíso	Arceburgo		
Sul/Sudoeste de Minas	São Sebastiao do Paraíso	Cabo Verde		
Sul/Sudoeste de Minas	São Sebastiao do Paraíso	Guaranésia		
Sul/Sudoeste de Minas	São Sebastiao do Paraíso	Guaxupé		
Sul/Sudoeste de Minas	São Sebastiao do Paraíso	Itamogi		
Sul/Sudoeste de Minas	São Sebastiao do Paraíso	Jacuí		
Sul/Sudoeste de Minas	São Sebastiao do Paraíso	Juruaia		
Sul/Sudoeste de Minas	São Sebastiao do Paraíso	Monte Belo		
Sul/Sudoeste de Minas	São Sebastiao do Paraíso	Monte Santo de Minas		
Sul/Sudoeste de Minas	São Sebastiao do Paraíso	Muzambinho		
Sul/Sudoeste de Minas	São Sebastiao do Paraíso	Nova Resende		
Sul/Sudoeste de Minas	São Sebastiao do Paraíso	São Pedro da União		
Sul/Sudoeste de Minas	São Sebastiao do Paraíso	São Sebastião do Paraíso		
Sul/Sudoeste de Minas	São Sebastiao do Paraíso	São Tomás de Aquino		
Sul/Sudoeste de Minas	Varginha	Boa Esperança		
Sul/Sudoeste de Minas	Varginha	Campanha		
Sul/Sudoeste de Minas	Varginha	Campo do Meio		
Sul/Sudoeste de Minas	Varginha	Campos Gerais		
Sul/Sudoeste de Minas	Varginha	Carmo da Cachoeira		
Sul/Sudoeste de Minas	Varginha	Coqueiral		
Sul/Sudoeste de Minas	Varginha	Elói Mendes		
Sul/Sudoeste de Minas	Varginha	Guapé		
Sul/Sudoeste de Minas	Varginha	Ilicínea		
Sul/Sudoeste de Minas	Varginha	Monsenhor Paulo		
Sul/Sudoeste de Minas	Varginha	Santana da Vargem		
Sul/Sudoeste de Minas	Varginha	São Bento Abade		
Sul/Sudoeste de Minas	Varginha	São Thomé das Letras		
Sul/Sudoeste de Minas	Varginha	Três Corações		
Sul/Sudoeste de Minas	Varginha	Três Pontas		
Sul/Sudoeste de Minas	Varginha	Varginha		
Triângulo Mineiro/Alto Paranaiba	Araxá	Araxá		
Triângulo Mineiro/Alto Paranaiba	Araxá	Campos Altos		
Triângulo Mineiro/Alto Paranaiba	Araxá	Ibiá		
Triângulo Mineiro/Alto Paranaiba	Araxá	Nova Ponte		
Triângulo Mineiro/Alto Paranaiba	Araxá	Pedrinópolis		
Triângulo Mineiro/Alto Paranaiba	Araxá	Perdizes		
Triângulo Mineiro/Alto Paranaiba	Araxá	Pratinha		
Triângulo Mineiro/Alto Paranaiba	Araxá	Sacramento		
Triângulo Mineiro/Alto Paranaiba	Araxá	Santa Juliana		
Triângulo Mineiro/Alto Paranaiba	Araxá	Tapira		
Triângulo Mineiro/Alto Paranaiba	Frutal	Campina Verde		
Triângulo Mineiro/Alto Paranaiba	Frutal	Carneirinho		
Triângulo Mineiro/Alto Paranaiba	Frutal	Comendador Gomes		
Triângulo Mineiro/Alto Paranaiba	Frutal	Fronteira		
Triângulo Mineiro/Alto Paranaiba	Frutal	Frutal		
Triângulo Mineiro/Alto Paranaiba	Frutal	Itapagipe		
Triângulo Mineiro/Alto Paranaiba	Frutal	Iturama		
Triângulo Mineiro/Alto Paranaiba	Frutal	Limeira do Oeste		
Triângulo Mineiro/Alto Paranaiba	Frutal	Pirajuba		
Triângulo Mineiro/Alto Paranaiba	Frutal	Planura		
Triângulo Mineiro/Alto Paranaiba	Frutal	São Francisco de Sales		
Triângulo Mineiro/Alto Paranaiba	Frutal	União de Minas		
Triângulo Mineiro/Alto Paranaiba	Ituiutaba	Cachoeira Dourada		
Triângulo Mineiro/Alto Paranaiba	Ituiutaba	Capinópolis		
Triângulo Mineiro/Alto Paranaiba	Ituiutaba	Gurinhatã		
Triângulo Mineiro/Alto Paranaiba	Ituiutaba	Ipiaçu		
Triângulo Mineiro/Alto Paranaiba	Ituiutaba	Ituiutaba		
Triângulo Mineiro/Alto Paranaiba	Ituiutaba	Santa Vitória		
Triângulo Mineiro/Alto Paranaiba	Patos de Minas	Arapuá		
Triângulo Mineiro/Alto Paranaiba	Patos de Minas	Carmo do Paranaíba		
Triângulo Mineiro/Alto Paranaiba	Patos de Minas	Guimarânia		
Triângulo Mineiro/Alto Paranaiba	Patos de Minas	Lagoa Formosa		
Triângulo Mineiro/Alto Paranaiba	Patos de Minas	Matutina		
Triângulo Mineiro/Alto Paranaiba	Patos de Minas	Patos de Minas		
Triângulo Mineiro/Alto Paranaiba	Patos de Minas	Rio Paranaíba		
Triângulo Mineiro/Alto Paranaiba	Patos de Minas	Santa Rosa da Serra		
Triângulo Mineiro/Alto Paranaiba	Patos de Minas	São Gotardo		
Triângulo Mineiro/Alto Paranaiba	Patos de Minas	Tiros		
Triângulo Mineiro/Alto Paranaiba	Patrocínio	Abadia dos Dourados		
Triângulo Mineiro/Alto Paranaiba	Patrocínio	Coromandel		
Triângulo Mineiro/Alto Paranaiba	Patrocínio	Cruzeiro da Fortaleza		
Triângulo Mineiro/Alto Paranaiba	Patrocínio	Douradoquara		
Triângulo Mineiro/Alto Paranaiba	Patrocínio	Estrela do Sul		
Triângulo Mineiro/Alto Paranaiba	Patrocínio	Grupiara		
Triângulo Mineiro/Alto Paranaiba	Patrocínio	Iraí de Minas		
Triângulo Mineiro/Alto Paranaiba	Patrocínio	Monte Carmelo		
Triângulo Mineiro/Alto Paranaiba	Patrocínio	Patrocínio		
Triângulo Mineiro/Alto Paranaiba	Patrocínio	Romaria		
Triângulo Mineiro/Alto Paranaiba	Patrocínio	Serra do Salitre		
Triângulo Mineiro/Alto Paranaiba	Uberaba	Água Comprida	2,108	492
Triângulo Mineiro/Alto Paranaiba	Uberaba	Campo Florido	8,466	1264
Triângulo Mineiro/Alto Paranaiba	Uberaba	Conceição das Alagoas	28,381	1340
Triângulo Mineiro/Alto Paranaiba	Uberaba	Conquista	6,694	618
Triângulo Mineiro/Alto Paranaiba	Uberaba	Delta	10,494	102
Triângulo Mineiro/Alto Paranaiba	Uberaba	Uberaba	337,836	4523
Triângulo Mineiro/Alto Paranaiba	Uberaba	Veríssimo	3,411	1031
Triângulo Mineiro/Alto Paranaiba	Uberlândia	Araguari	117,808	2729
Triângulo Mineiro/Alto Paranaiba	Uberlândia	Araporã	8,479	294
Triângulo Mineiro/Alto Paranaiba	Uberlândia	Canápolis	10,608	843
Triângulo Mineiro/Alto Paranaiba	Uberlândia	Cascalho Rico	2,712	367
Triângulo Mineiro/Alto Paranaiba	Uberlândia	Centralina	10,207	322
Triângulo Mineiro/Alto Paranaiba	Uberlândia	Indianópolis	6,171	830
Triângulo Mineiro/Alto Paranaiba	Uberlândia	Monte Alegre de Minas	20,170	2595
Triângulo Mineiro/Alto Paranaiba	Uberlândia	Prata	28,342	4847
Triângulo Mineiro/Alto Paranaiba	Uberlândia	Tupaciguara	25,470	1822
Triângulo Mineiro/Alto Paranaiba	Uberlândia	Uberlândia	713,224	4115
Vale do Mucuri	Nanuque	Águas Formosas		
Vale do Mucuri	Nanuque	Bertópolis		
Vale do Mucuri	Nanuque	Carlos Chagas		
Vale do Mucuri	Nanuque	Crisólita		
Vale do Mucuri	Nanuque	Fronteira dos Vales		
Vale do Mucuri	Nanuque	Machacalis		
Vale do Mucuri	Nanuque	Nanuque		
Vale do Mucuri	Nanuque	Santa Helena de Minas		
Vale do Mucuri	Nanuque	Serra dos Aimorés		
Vale do Mucuri	Nanuque	Umburatiba		
Vale do Mucuri	Teófilo Otoni	Ataléia		
Vale do Mucuri	Teófilo Otoni	Catuji		
Vale do Mucuri	Teófilo Otoni	Franciscópolis		
Vale do Mucuri	Teófilo Otoni	Frei Gaspar		
Vale do Mucuri	Teófilo Otoni	Itaipé		
Vale do Mucuri	Teófilo Otoni	Ladainha		
Vale do Mucuri	Teófilo Otoni	Malacacheta		
Vale do Mucuri	Teófilo Otoni	Novo Oriente de Minas		
Vale do Mucuri	Teófilo Otoni	Ouro Verde de Minas		
Vale do Mucuri	Teófilo Otoni	Pavão		
Vale do Mucuri	Teófilo Otoni	Poté		
Vale do Mucuri	Teófilo Otoni	Setubinha		
Vale do Mucuri	Teófilo Otoni	Teófilo Otoni		
Vale do Rio Doce	Aimorés	Aimorés	25,269	1348
Vale do Rio Doce	Aimorés	Alvarenga	3,975	278
Vale do Rio Doce	Aimorés	Conceição de Ipanema	4,409	253
Vale do Rio Doce	Aimorés	Conselheiro Pena	20,824	1483
Vale do Rio Doce	Aimorés	Cuparaque	3,983	226
Vale do Rio Doce	Aimorés	Goiabeira	2,830	112
Vale do Rio Doce	Aimorés	Ipanema	19,522	456
Vale do Rio Doce	Aimorés	Itueta	6,055	452
Vale do Rio Doce	Aimorés	Mutum	27,635	1250
Vale do Rio Doce	Aimorés	Pocrane	8,350	691
Vale do Rio Doce	Aimorés	Resplendor	17,226	1081
Vale do Rio Doce	Aimorés	Santa Rita do Itueto	5,826	485
Vale do Rio Doce	Aimorés	Taparuba	3,387	193
Vale do Rio Doce	Caratinga	Bom Jesus do Galho	14,536	592
Vale do Rio Doce	Caratinga	Bugre	4,041	161
Vale do Rio Doce	Caratinga	Caratinga	87,360	1258
Vale do Rio Doce	Caratinga	Córrego Novo	2,875	205
Vale do Rio Doce	Caratinga	Dom Cavati	4,904	59
Vale do Rio Doce	Caratinga	Entre Folhas	5,179	85
Vale do Rio Doce	Caratinga	Iapu	12,030	340
Vale do Rio Doce	Caratinga	Imbé de Minas	6,986	196
Vale do Rio Doce	Caratinga	Inhapim	22,692	858
Vale do Rio Doce	Caratinga	Ipaba	17,136	113
Vale do Rio Doce	Caratinga	Piedade de Caratinga	8,529	109
Vale do Rio Doce	Caratinga	Pingo-d'Água	4,706	66
Vale do Rio Doce	Caratinga	Santa Bárbara do Leste	8,458	107
Vale do Rio Doce	Caratinga	Santa Rita de Minas	6,773	68
Vale do Rio Doce	Caratinga	São Domingos das Dores		
Vale do Rio Doce	Caratinga	São João do Oriente		
Vale do Rio Doce	Caratinga	São Sebastião do Anta		
Vale do Rio Doce	Caratinga	Tarumirim		
Vale do Rio Doce	Caratinga	Ubaporanga		
Vale do Rio Doce	Caratinga	Vargem Alegre		
Vale do Rio Doce	Governador Valadares	Alpercata		
Vale do Rio Doce	Governador Valadares	Campanário		
Vale do Rio Doce	Governador Valadares	Capitão Andrade		
Vale do Rio Doce	Governador Valadares	Coroaci		
Vale do Rio Doce	Governador Valadares	Divino das Laranjeiras		
Vale do Rio Doce	Governador Valadares	Engenheiro Caldas		
Vale do Rio Doce	Governador Valadares	Fernandes Tourinho		
Vale do Rio Doce	Governador Valadares	Frei Inocêncio		
Vale do Rio Doce	Governador Valadares	Galiléia		
Vale do Rio Doce	Governador Valadares	Governador Valadares	257,171	2342
Vale do Rio Doce	Governador Valadares	Itambacuri		
Vale do Rio Doce	Governador Valadares	Itanhomi		
Vale do Rio Doce	Governador Valadares	Jampruca		
Vale do Rio Doce	Governador Valadares	Marilac		
Vale do Rio Doce	Governador Valadares	Mathias Lobato		
Vale do Rio Doce	Governador Valadares	Nacip Raydan		
Vale do Rio Doce	Governador Valadares	Nova Módica		
Vale do Rio Doce	Governador Valadares	Pescador		
Vale do Rio Doce	Governador Valadares	São Geraldo da Piedade		
Vale do Rio Doce	Governador Valadares	São Geraldo do Baixio		
Vale do Rio Doce	Governador Valadares	São José da Safira		
Vale do Rio Doce	Governador Valadares	São José do Divino		
Vale do Rio Doce	Governador Valadares	Sobrália		
Vale do Rio Doce	Governador Valadares	Tumiritinga		
Vale do Rio Doce	Governador Valadares	Virgolândia		
Vale do Rio Doce	Guanhães	Braúnas	4,441	378
Vale do Rio Doce	Guanhães	Carmésia	2,605	259
Vale do Rio Doce	Guanhães	Coluna	8,163	348
Vale do Rio Doce	Guanhães	Divinolândia de Minas	6,516	133
Vale do Rio Doce	Guanhães	Dores de Guanhães	5,029	382
Vale do Rio Doce	Guanhães	Gonzaga	5,230	209
Vale do Rio Doce	Guanhães	Guanhães	32,244	1075
Vale do Rio Doce	Guanhães	Materlândia	3,963	280
Vale do Rio Doce	Guanhães	Paulistas	4,389	220
Vale do Rio Doce	Guanhães	Sabinópolis	14,240	919
Vale do Rio Doce	Guanhães	Santa Efigênia de Minas	4,039	131
Vale do Rio Doce	Guanhães	São João Evangelista	15,315	478
Vale do Rio Doce	Guanhães	Sardoá	5,104	141
Vale do Rio Doce	Guanhães	Senhora do Porto	3,067	381
Vale do Rio Doce	Guanhães	Virginópolis	10,314	439
Vale do Rio Doce	Ipatinga	Açucena	8,943	815
Vale do Rio Doce	Ipatinga	Antônio Dias	9,219	787
Vale do Rio Doce	Ipatinga	Belo Oriente	23,928	334
Vale do Rio Doce	Ipatinga	Coronel Fabriciano	104,736	221
Vale do Rio Doce	Ipatinga	Ipatinga	227,731	164
Vale do Rio Doce	Ipatinga	Jaguaraçu	3,092	163
Vale do Rio Doce	Ipatinga	Joanésia	4,329	233
Vale do Rio Doce	Ipatinga	Marliéria	4,592	545
Vale do Rio Doce	Ipatinga	Mesquita	5,040	274
Vale do Rio Doce	Ipatinga	Naque	6,303	127
Vale do Rio Doce	Ipatinga	Periquito	6,553	228
Vale do Rio Doce	Ipatinga	Santana do Paraíso	44,800	276
Vale do Rio Doce	Ipatinga	Timóteo	81,579	144
Vale do Rio Doce	Mantena	Central de Minas	6,171	204
Vale do Rio Doce	Mantena	Itabirinha	10,362	209
Vale do Rio Doce	Mantena	Mantena	26,535	685
Vale do Rio Doce	Mantena	Mendes Pimentel	5,606	305
Vale do Rio Doce	Mantena	Nova Belém	3,151	146
Vale do Rio Doce	Mantena	São Félix de Minas	3,200	162
Vale do Rio Doce	Mantena	São João do Manteninha	5,331	137
Vale do Rio Doce	Peçanha	Água Boa	12,589	1320
Vale do Rio Doce	Peçanha	Cantagalo	3,974	141
Vale do Rio Doce	Peçanha	Frei Lagonegro	3,391	167
Vale do Rio Doce	Peçanha	José Raydan	4,268	180
Vale do Rio Doce	Peçanha	Peçanha	17,446	996
Vale do Rio Doce	Peçanha	Santa Maria do Suaçuí	12,788	624
Vale do Rio Doce	Peçanha	São José do Jacuri	6,197	345
Vale do Rio Doce	Peçanha	São Pedro do Suaçuí	5,103	308
Vale do Rio Doce	Peçanha	São Sebastião do Maranhão	10,079	517
Zona da Mata	Cataguases	Além Paraíba	30,717	510
Zona da Mata	Cataguases	Argirita	2,688	159
Zona da Mata	Cataguases	Cataguases	66,261	491
Zona da Mata	Cataguases	Dona Eusébia	6,093	70
Zona da Mata	Cataguases	Estrela Dalva	2,186	131
Zona da Mata	Cataguases	Itamarati de Minas	3,690	94
Zona da Mata	Cataguases	Laranjal	5,963	204
Zona da Mata	Cataguases	Leopoldina	51,145	943
Zona da Mata	Cataguases	Palma	5,707	316
Zona da Mata	Cataguases	Pirapetinga	11,077	190
Zona da Mata	Cataguases	Recreio	11,007	234
Zona da Mata	Cataguases	Santana de Cataguases	3,489	161
Zona da Mata	Cataguases	Santo Antônio do Aventureiro	3,769	202
Zona da Mata	Cataguases	Volta Grande	4,443	205
Zona da Mata	Juiz de Fora	Aracitaba	2,049	106
Zona da Mata	Juiz de Fora	Belmiro Braga	3,244	393
Zona da Mata	Juiz de Fora	Bias Fortes	3,361	283
Zona da Mata	Juiz de Fora	Bicas	13,978	140
Zona da Mata	Juiz de Fora	Chácara	3,075	152
Zona da Mata	Juiz de Fora	Chiador	2,800	252
Zona da Mata	Juiz de Fora	Coronel Pacheco	2,762	131
Zona da Mata	Juiz de Fora	Descoberto	4,928	213
Zona da Mata	Juiz de Fora	Ewbank da Câmara	3,875	103
Zona da Mata	Juiz de Fora	Goianá	4,053	152
Zona da Mata	Juiz de Fora	Guarará	3,149	88
Zona da Mata	Juiz de Fora	Juiz de Fora	540,756	1435
Zona da Mata	Juiz de Fora	Lima Duarte	17,221	848
Zona da Mata	Juiz de Fora	Mar de Espanha	12,721	371
Zona da Mata	Juiz de Fora	Maripá de Minas	3,387	77
Zona da Mata	Juiz de Fora	Matias Barbosa	14,121	157
Zona da Mata	Juiz de Fora	Olaria	1,945	178
Zona da Mata	Juiz de Fora	Oliveira Fortes	2,027	111
Zona da Mata	Juiz de Fora	Paiva	1,474	58
Zona da Mata	Juiz de Fora	Pedro Teixeira	1,810	112
Zona da Mata	Juiz de Fora	Pequeri	3,351	90
Zona da Mata	Juiz de Fora	Piau	2,796	192
Zona da Mata	Juiz de Fora	Rio Novo	8,518	209
Zona da Mata	Juiz de Fora	Rio Preto	5,141	348
Zona da Mata	Juiz de Fora	Rochedo de Minas	2,291	79
Zona da Mata	Juiz de Fora	Santa Bárbara do Monte Verde	3,095	417
Zona da Mata	Juiz de Fora	Santa Rita de Ibitipoca	3,301	324
Zona da Mata	Juiz de Fora	Santa Rita de Jacutinga	25,525	347
Zona da Mata	Juiz de Fora	Santana do Deserto	3,747	182
Zona da Mata	Juiz de Fora	Santos Dumont	42,406	637
Zona da Mata	Juiz de Fora	São João Nepomuceno	25,018	582
Zona da Mata	Juiz de Fora	Senador Cortes	2,240	98
Zona da Mata	Juiz de Fora	Simão Pereira	2,947	135
Zona da Mata	Manhuaçu	Abre Campo	13,927	470
Zona da Mata	Manhuaçu	Alto Caparaó	5,795	103
Zona da Mata	Manhuaçu	Alto Jequitibá	8,397	152
Zona da Mata	Manhuaçu	Caparaó	5,048	130
Zona da Mata	Manhuaçu	Caputira	8,936	187
Zona da Mata	Manhuaçu	Chalé	6,075	212
Zona da Mata	Manhuaçu	Durandé	7,817	217
Zona da Mata	Manhuaçu	Lajinha	20,835	431
Zona da Mata	Manhuaçu	Luisburgo	6,956	145
Zona da Mata	Manhuaçu	Manhuaçu	91,886	628
Zona da Mata	Manhuaçu	Manhumirim	20,613	182
Zona da Mata	Manhuaçu	Martins Soares	8,396	113
Zona da Mata	Manhuaçu	Matipó	18,552	266
Zona da Mata	Manhuaçu	Pedra Bonita	7,320	173
Zona da Mata	Manhuaçu	Reduto	7,848	151
Zona da Mata	Manhuaçu	Santa Margarida	16,395	255
Zona da Mata	Manhuaçu	Santana do Manhuaçu	8,987	347
Zona da Mata	Manhuaçu	São João do Manhuaçu	11,246	143
Zona da Mata	Manhuaçu	São José do Mantimento	2,753	54
Zona da Mata	Manhuaçu	Simonésia	19,750	486
Zona da Mata	Muriaé	Antônio Prado de Minas	1,538	83
Zona da Mata	Muriaé	Barão do Monte Alto	4,964	198
Zona da Mata	Muriaé	Caiana	5,304	106
Zona da Mata	Muriaé	Carangola	31,240	353
Zona da Mata	Muriaé	Divino	20,706	337
Zona da Mata	Muriaé	Espera Feliz	24,102	317
Zona da Mata	Muriaé	Eugenópolis	10,801	309
Zona da Mata	Muriaé	Faria Lemos	3,188	165
Zona da Mata	Muriaé	Fervedouro	10,445	357
Zona da Mata	Muriaé	Miradouro	8,968	301
Zona da Mata	Muriaé	Miraí	13,633	320
Zona da Mata	Muriaé	Muriaé	104,108	841
Zona da Mata	Muriaé	Orizânia	8,437	121
Zona da Mata	Muriaé	Patrocínio do Muriaé	5,576	108
Zona da Mata	Muriaé	Pedra Dourada	2,757	69
Zona da Mata	Muriaé	Rosário da Limeira	4,734	111
Zona da Mata	Muriaé	São Francisco do Glória	4,800	164
Zona da Mata	Muriaé	São Sebastião da Vargem Alegre	3,113	73
Zona da Mata	Muriaé	Tombos	8,609	285
Zona da Mata	Muriaé	Vieiras	3,700	112
Zona da Mata	Ponte Nova	Acaiaca	3,909	101
Zona da Mata	Ponte Nova	Barra Longa	5,666	383
Zona da Mata	Ponte Nova	Dom Silvério	5,228	194
Zona da Mata	Ponte Nova	Guaraciaba	9,753	348
Zona da Mata	Ponte Nova	Jequeri	12,419	547
Zona da Mata	Ponte Nova	Oratórios	4,917	89
Zona da Mata	Ponte Nova	Piedade de Ponte Nova	3,976	83
Zona da Mata	Ponte Nova	Ponte Nova	57,776	470
Zona da Mata	Ponte Nova	Raul Soares	23,423	763
Zona da Mata	Ponte Nova	Rio Casca	12,789	384
Zona da Mata	Ponte Nova	Rio Doce	2,484	112
Zona da Mata	Ponte Nova	Santa Cruz do Escalvado	4,673	258
Zona da Mata	Ponte Nova	Santo Antônio do Grama	4,229	130
Zona da Mata	Ponte Nova	São Pedro dos Ferros	7,166	402
Zona da Mata	Ponte Nova	Sem-Peixe	2,433	176
Zona da Mata	Ponte Nova	Sericita	7,345	166
Zona da Mata	Ponte Nova	Urucânia	10,600	138
Zona da Mata	Ponte Nova	Vermelho Novo	4,899	115
Zona da Mata	Ubá	Astolfo Dutra	14,138	158
Zona da Mata	Ubá	Divinésia	4,226	116
Zona da Mata	Ubá	Dores do Turvo	4,987	231
Zona da Mata	Ubá	Guarani	7,714	264
Zona da Mata	Ubá	Guidoval	7,131	158
Zona da Mata	Ubá	Guiricema	7,778	293
Zona da Mata	Ubá	Mercês	10,373	348
Zona da Mata	Ubá	Piraúba	11,610	144
Zona da Mata	Ubá	Rio Pomba	17,443	252
Zona da Mata	Ubá	Rodeiro	8,664	72
Zona da Mata	Ubá	São Geraldo	10,282	185
Zona da Mata	Ubá	Senador Firmino	7,716	166
Zona da Mata	Ubá	Silveirânia	2,323	157
Zona da Mata	Ubá	Tabuleiro	4,014	211
Zona da Mata	Ubá	Tocantins	16,185	173
Zona da Mata	Ubá	Ubá	103,365	407
Zona da Mata	Ubá	Visconde do Rio Branco	39,160	243
Zona da Mata	Viçosa	Alto Rio Doce	10,891	518
Zona da Mata	Viçosa	Amparo do Serra	4,541	136
Zona da Mata	Viçosa	Araponga	8,048	303
Zona da Mata	Viçosa	Brás Pires	4,260	223
Zona da Mata	Viçosa	Cajuri	4,088	83
Zona da Mata	Viçosa	Canaã	4,715	174
Zona da Mata	Viçosa	Cipotânea	5,581	153
Zona da Mata	Viçosa	Coimbra	7,117	106
Zona da Mata	Viçosa	Ervália	20,255	357
Zona da Mata	Viçosa	Lamim	3,184	118
Zona da Mata	Viçosa	Paula Cândido	8,659	268
Zona da Mata	Viçosa	Pedra do Anta	3,311	173
Zona da Mata	Viçosa	Piranga	17,018	658
Zona da Mata	Viçosa	Porto Firme	10,569	284
Zona da Mata	Viçosa	Presidente Bernardes	4,850	236
Zona da Mata	Viçosa	Rio Espera	5,429	238
Zona da Mata	Viçosa	São Miguel do Anta	6,334	152
Zona da Mata	Viçosa	Senhora de Oliveira	5,483	170
Zona da Mata	Viçosa	Teixeiras	12,255	166
Zona da Mata	Viçosa	Viçosa	76,430	299

== See also ==
- Geography of Brazil
- List of cities in Brazil
