= Divinolândia de Minas =

Coordinates: 18.8039°S 42.5978°W

- Municipality
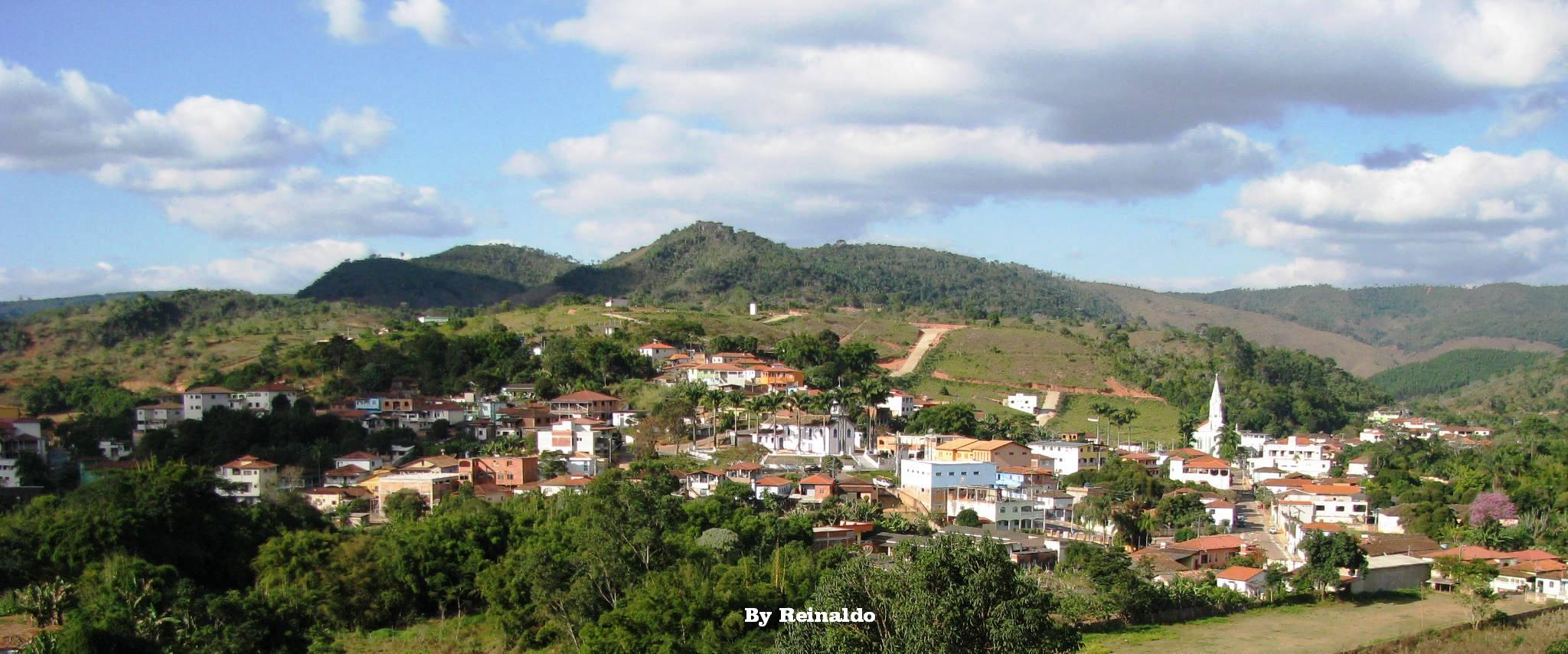

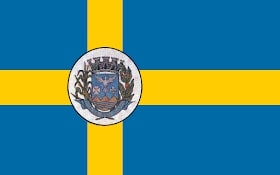
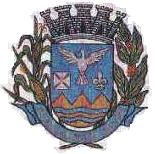
- Flag Coat of arms
- Interactive map of Divinolândia de Minas
- Country: Brazil
- Region: Southeast
- State: Minas Gerais
- Mesoregion: Vale do Rio Doce

Population (2022 Census)
  - Total: 6,516
  - Estimate (2025): 6,583
- Time zone: UTC−3 (BRT)

Divinolândia de Minas is a municipality in the state of Minas Gerais in the Southeast region of Brazil.

== See also ==
- List of municipalities in Minas Gerais
