= Jequeri =

Brazilian municipality located in the state of Minas Gerais

Coordinates: 20°27′S 42°40′W

- Municipality
- Interactive map of Jequeri
- Country: Brazil
- State: Minas Gerais
- Region: Southeast
- Time zone: UTC−3 (BRT)

Location of Jequeri within Minas Gerais

Jequeri is a Brazilian municipality located in the state of Minas Gerais. The city belongs to the mesoregion of Zona da Mata and to the microregion of Ponte Nova. As of 2020, the estimated population was 12,315.

== See also ==
- List of municipalities in Minas Gerais
