= Espírito Santo do Dourado =

Coordinates: 22°03′S 45°58′W

- Municipality
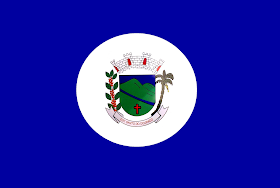
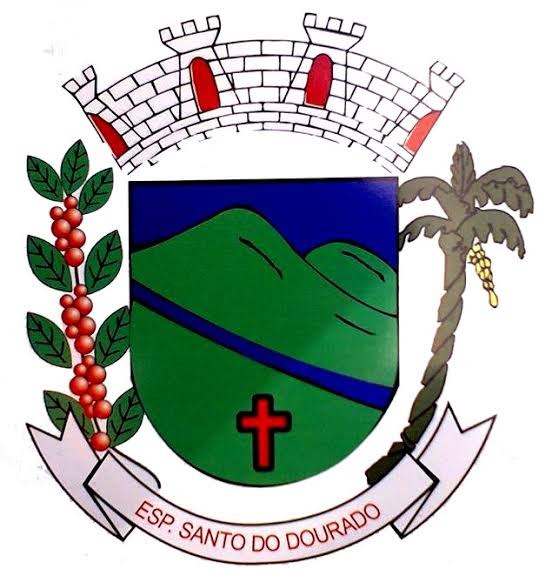
- Flag Coat of arms
- Interactive map of Espírito Santo do Dourado
- Country: Brazil
- Region: Southeast
- State: Minas Gerais
- Mesoregion: Sud/Sudoeste de Minas

Population (2020)
  - Total: 4,710
- Time zone: UTC−3 (BRT)

Espírito Santo do Dourado is a municipality in the state of Minas Gerais in the Southeast region of Brazil.

== See also ==
- List of municipalities in Minas Gerais
