= Turvolândia =

- Municipality
- Location in Brazil
- Coordinates: 21°52′33″S 45°47′13″W
- Country: Brazil
- Region: Southeast
- State: Minas Gerais
- Mesoregion: Sul/Sudoeste de Minas

Population (2020)
  - Total: 5,070
- Time zone: UTC−3 (BRT)

Turvolândia is a municipality in the state of Minas Gerais in the Southeast region of Brazil.

== See also ==
- List of municipalities in Minas Gerais
