= Sem-Peixe =

Brazilian municipality located in the state of Minas Gerais

Coordinates: 20°06′32″S 42°50′20″W

- Municipality
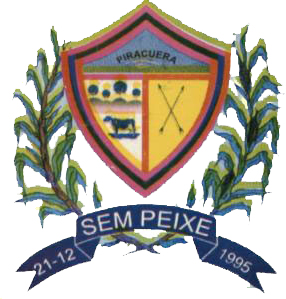
- Coat of arms
- Interactive map of Sem-Peixe
- Country: Brazil
- State: Minas Gerais
- Region: Southeast
- Time zone: UTC−3 (BRT)

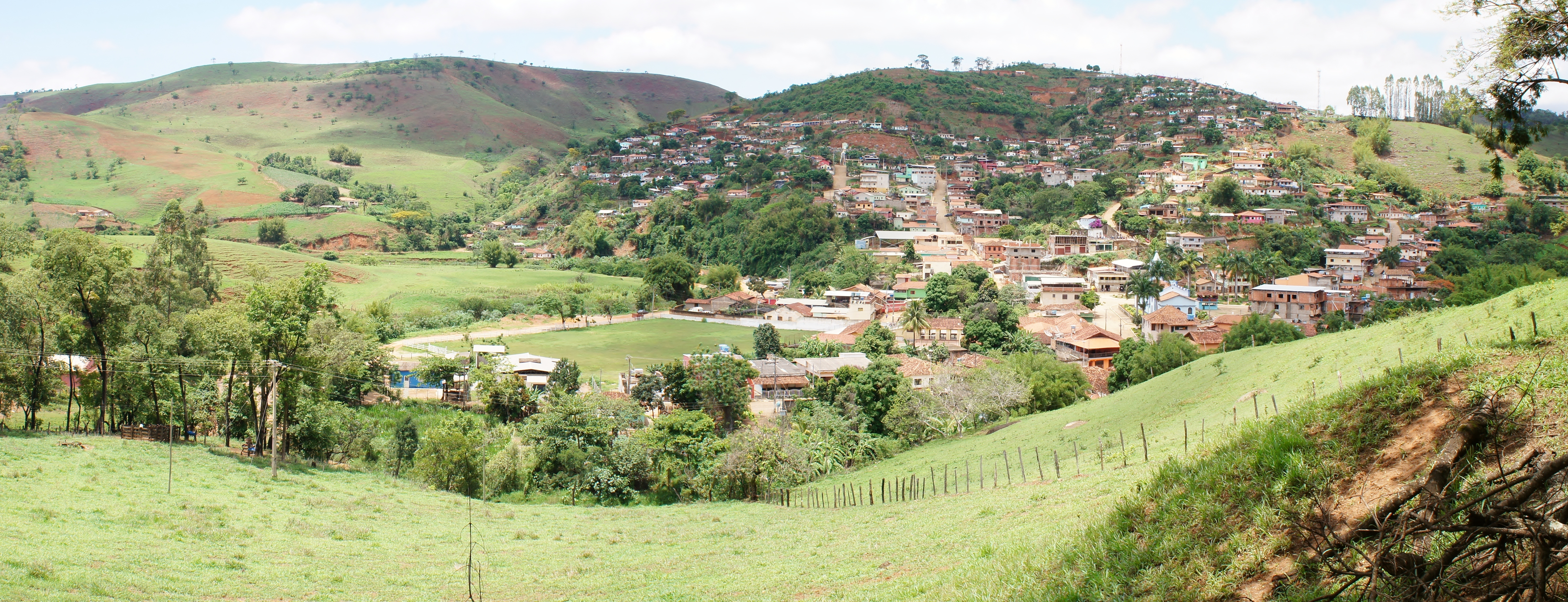
Panoramic view of Sem-Peixe

Location of Sem-Peixe within Minas Gerais

Sem-Peixe is a Brazilian municipality located in the state of Minas Gerais. The city belongs to the mesoregion of Zona da Mata and to the microregion of Ponte Nova. As of 2020, the estimated population was 2,606.

== See also ==
- List of municipalities in Minas Gerais
