= Inconfidentes =

- Municipality
- Location in Brazil
- Coordinates: 22°19′1″S 46°19′40″W
- Country: Brazil
- Region: Southeast
- State: Minas Gerais
- Mesoregion: Sudoeste de Minas

Population (2020)
  - Total: 7,358
- Time zone: UTC−3 (BRT)

Inconfidentes is a municipality in the state of Minas Gerais in the Southeast region of Brazil.

== See also ==
- List of municipalities in Minas Gerais
