= Coluna, Minas Gerais =

Coordinates: 18°14′02″S 42°50′24″W

Coluna
- Municipality
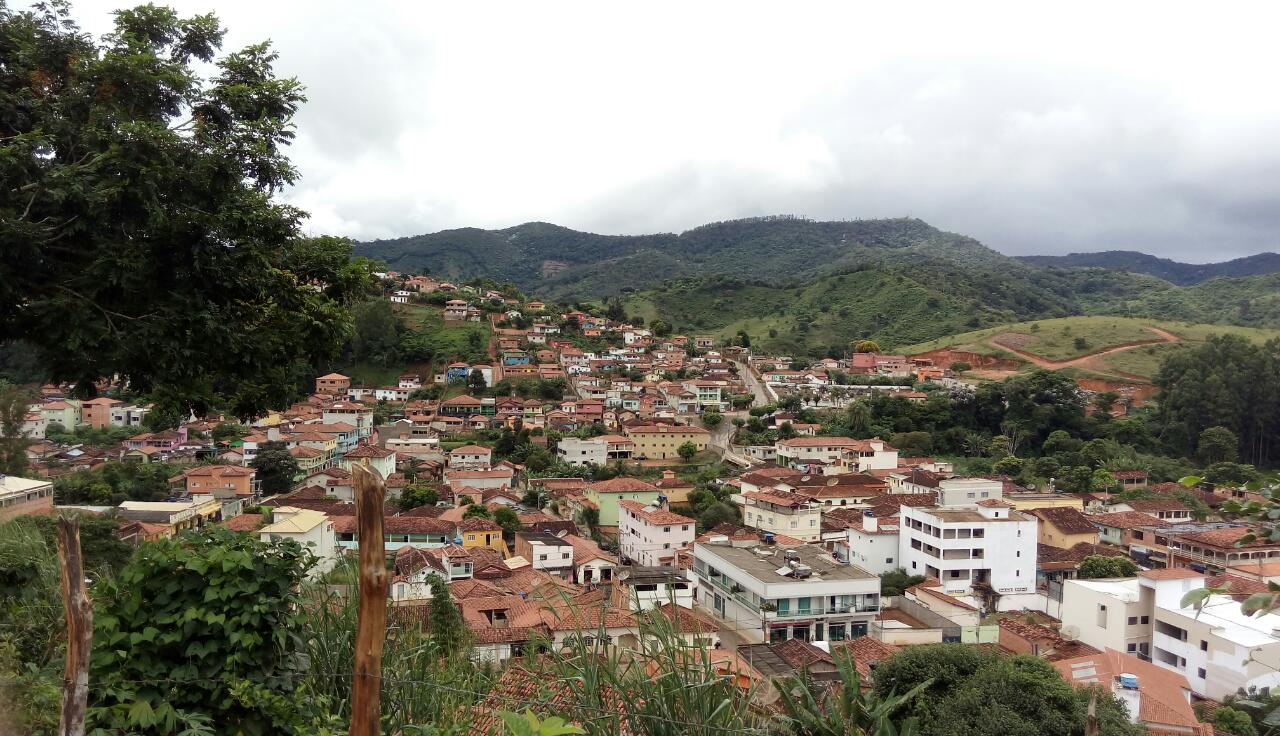

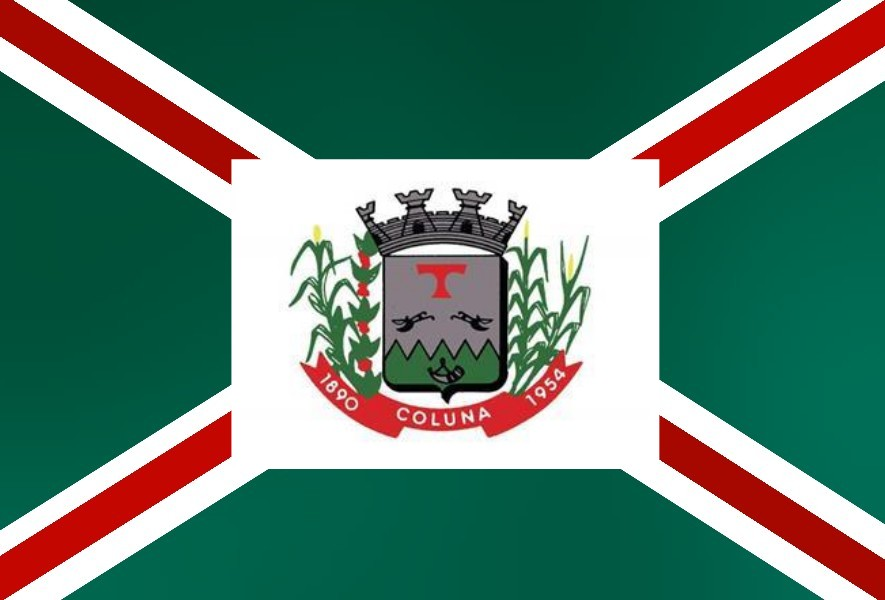
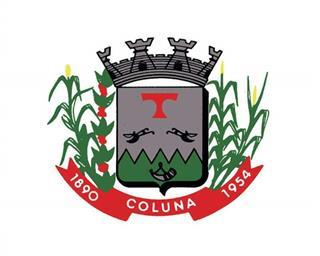
- Flag Coat of arms
- Interactive map of Coluna
- Country: Brazil
- Region: Southeast
- State: Minas Gerais
- Mesoregion: Vale do do Rio Doce

Government
  - Mayor: Nilson Rocha dos Anjos (MDB)
- Elevation: 2,267 ft (691 m)

Population (2022 Census)
  - Total: 8,163
  - Estimate (2025): 8,206
- Time zone: UTC−3 (BRT)

Coluna is a municipality in the state of Minas Gerais in the Southeast region of Brazil.

== See also ==
- List of municipalities in Minas Gerais
