= Comercinho =

Coordinates: 16°18′0″S 41°47′44″W

- Municipality
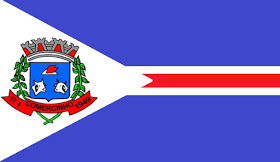
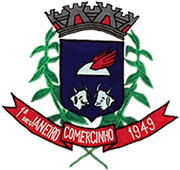
- Flag Coat of arms

- Country: Brazil
- State: Minas Gerais
- Incorporated: 27 March 1945

Government
  - Mayor: Ednalves Alves Costa (PT)

Area
  - Total: 656,563 km^{2} (253,500 sq mi)

Population (2020)
  - Total: 6,774
  - Density: 12.6/km^{2} (33/sq mi)
- Demonym: Comercinhense
- Time zone: UTC-3
- Postal Code: 39628-000
- Area code(s): +55 33
- Website: Comercinho, Minas Gerais

Comercinho is a municipality in the northeast of the Brazilian state of Minas Gerais. Its population in 2020 was 6,774 inhabitants in a total area of 657 km^{2} (254 sq mi).

Comercinho belongs to the Pedra Azul statistical microregion. The elevation of the municipal seat is 614 meters. It became a municipality in 1942. This municipality is located to the southeast of Salinas on a dirt road that connects Santa Cruz de Salinas to Itinga. The closest population center with a hospital and banking facilities is Medina, a distance of about 36 km.

Neighboring municipalities are: Medina, Salinas, Santa Cruz de Salinas, Rubelita, and Itinga.

The main economic activities are cattle raising and farming. The GDP was R$27,441,000 (2005). There were no banking agencies in 2006. In the rural area there were 1,175 farms with around 3,100 people involved in the agricultural sector. There were 22 tractors, a ratio of one tractor for every 50 farms. The main crops were bananas, coffee, sugarcane, beans, manioc, and corn. In the health sector there were 3 health clinics. The score on the Municipal Human Development Index was 0.603. This ranked Comercinho 830 out of 853 municipalities in the state, with Poços de Caldas in first place with 0.841 and Setubinha in last place with 0.568. See Frigoletto for the complete list.

== See also ==
- List of municipalities in Minas Gerais
