= Padre Carvalho =

Municipality of Brazil

Coordinates: 16°21′50″S 42°30′54″W

- Municipality
- Interactive map of Padre Carvalho
- Country: Brazil
- State: Minas Gerais
- Region: Southeast
- Time zone: UTC−3 (BRT)

Location of Padre Carvalho within the state of Minas Gerais

Padre Carvalho is a Brazilian municipality located in the north of the state of Minas Gerais. In 2020 the population was 6,423 in a total area of 450 km^{2} (170 sq mi). It became a municipality in 1997.

== Geography ==
Padre Carvalho is located in the foothills of the Serra do Espinhaço mountains southwest of Salinas at an elevation of 750 meters. It is north of the Rio Jequitinhonha and just east of the Rio Vacaria, a tributary of the Jequitinhonha. Neighboring municipalities are: Grão Mogol, Josenópolis, Rubelita, Fruta de Leite e Rio Pardo de Minas.

Padre Carvalho is part of the statistical microregion of Grão Mogol.

== Economic activities ==
The most important economic activities are cattle raising on a modest scale (2,400 head in 2006) and subsistence agriculture. The GDP in 2005 was R$ 11,849,000. The most important agricultural crops are bananas, coffee, peanuts, sugarcane, and corn. In the rural area, there were 281 producers. The total area of agricultural land was 10,000 hectares in 2006, of which 2,200 ha. were in crops. As of 2006, there were only 02 tractors. In the urban area, there were no banking agencies in 2006.

== Health and education ==
This municipality is isolated from major population centers and suffers from drought and poor soils.

- Municipal Human Development Index: .618 (2000)
- State ranking: 808 out of 853 municipalities as of 2000
- National ranking: 4,343 out of 5,138 municipalities as of 2000

The highest ranking municipality in Minas Gerais in 2000 was Poços de Caldas with 0.841, while the lowest was Setubinha with 0.568. Nationally the highest was São Caetano do Sul in São Paulo with 0.919, while the lowest was Setubinha.

- Degree of urbanization: 56.82% (2000)
- Infant mortality rate: n/a (2000) The rate for Minas Gerais was 17.40; the rate for Brazil was 18.91.
- Illiteracy rate: 36.67% (15 years old or older)(Data from 2000) The rate for Minas Gerais was 11.96; the rate for Brazil was 13.63
- Urban area covered by sewage system: 1.50%--the rate for Minas Gerais was 81.39%
- Health centers and hospitals: 03 health center. There were no hospitals.

== See also ==
- List of municipalities in Minas Gerais
