= Rio Pardo de Minas =

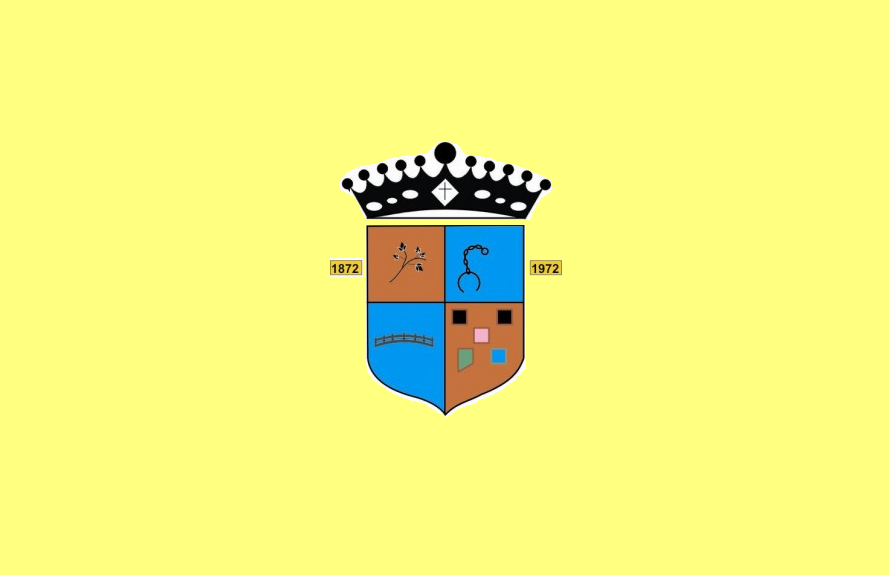
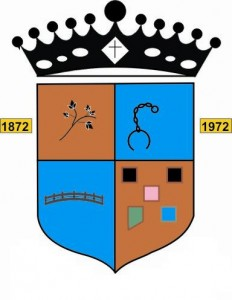
- Flag Coat of arms

- Location in Minas Gerais
- Coordinates: 15°36′20″S 42°32′03″W
- Country: Brazil
- Region: Southeast
- State: Minas Gerais

Area
  - Total: 3,117 km^{2} (1,203 sq mi)

Population (2022)
  - Total: 28,271
  - Density: 9.07/km^{2} (23.5/sq mi)
- Time zone: UTC−3 (BRT)

Rio Pardo de Minas is a municipality in the northeast of the Brazilian state of Minas Gerais. Its population in 2020 was 31,045 inhabitants in a total area of 3,117 square kilometres (1,203 mi^{2}).

== Geography ==
The elevation is 751 metres (2,464 ft). It became a municipality in 1831. The postal code (CEP) is 39530–000. The population density was 9.33 inhabitants per km^{2} (24.19 per mi^{2}) in 2010. Rio Pardo de Minas is located on dirt roads (MG-342), 70 kilometres (43 mi) northwest of Salinas. The Rio Pardo flows through the town. It is part of the statistical microregion of Salinas.

The municipality contains about 29% of the 38,177 hectares (94,340 acres) Nascentes Geraizeiras Sustainable Development Reserve, created in 2014. The reserve protects an area of the cerrado biome. The municipality also contains part of the 49,830 hectares (123,100 acres) Serra Nova State Park, created in 2003.

=== Neighboring municipalities ===
- Neighboring municipalities are: Novorizonte, Fruta de Leite, Mato Verde, Porteirinha, Serranópolis de Minas, Riacho dos Machados, Grão Mogol, Padre Carvalho, Salinas, Indaiabira, Vargem Grande do Rio Pardo, Montezuma and Santo Antônio do Retiro.

== Economy ==
The main economic activities are cattle raising (10,000 head in 2006), small industries and agriculture. The main crops are bananas, citrus fruits, beans, sugarcane, tomatoes, and corn. In the rural area there were 3,205 producers on 75,000 ha. Natural pasture made up 18,000 ha, woodland 33,000 ha. and planted area 11,500 ha. Around 10,500 persons worked in agriculture. The GDP in 2003 was R$64,482,000 while the per capita GDP was R$2,319. In 2006 there was one bank. Health needs were taken care of by 11 municipal health centers, one private health center and one hospital with 42 beds.

== Health and education ==
This municipality is isolated from major population centers and suffers from drought and poor soils.

- Municipal Human Development Index: .633 (2000)
- State ranking: 787 out of 853 municipalities as of 2000
- National ranking: 4,072 out of 5,138 municipalities as of 2000

== See also ==
- List of municipalities in Minas Gerais

== Sources ==
- Diniz, Ana Elizabeth (5 November 2009), "Parque Estadual de Serra Nova: natureza mágica", Revista Ecológico (in Portuguese), archived from the original on 2017-02-02
- RDS Nascentes Geraizeiras (in Portuguese), ISA: Instituto Socioambiental
