= Centro de Cultura Presidente Itamar Franco =

Cultural complex in Belo Horizonte, Brazil

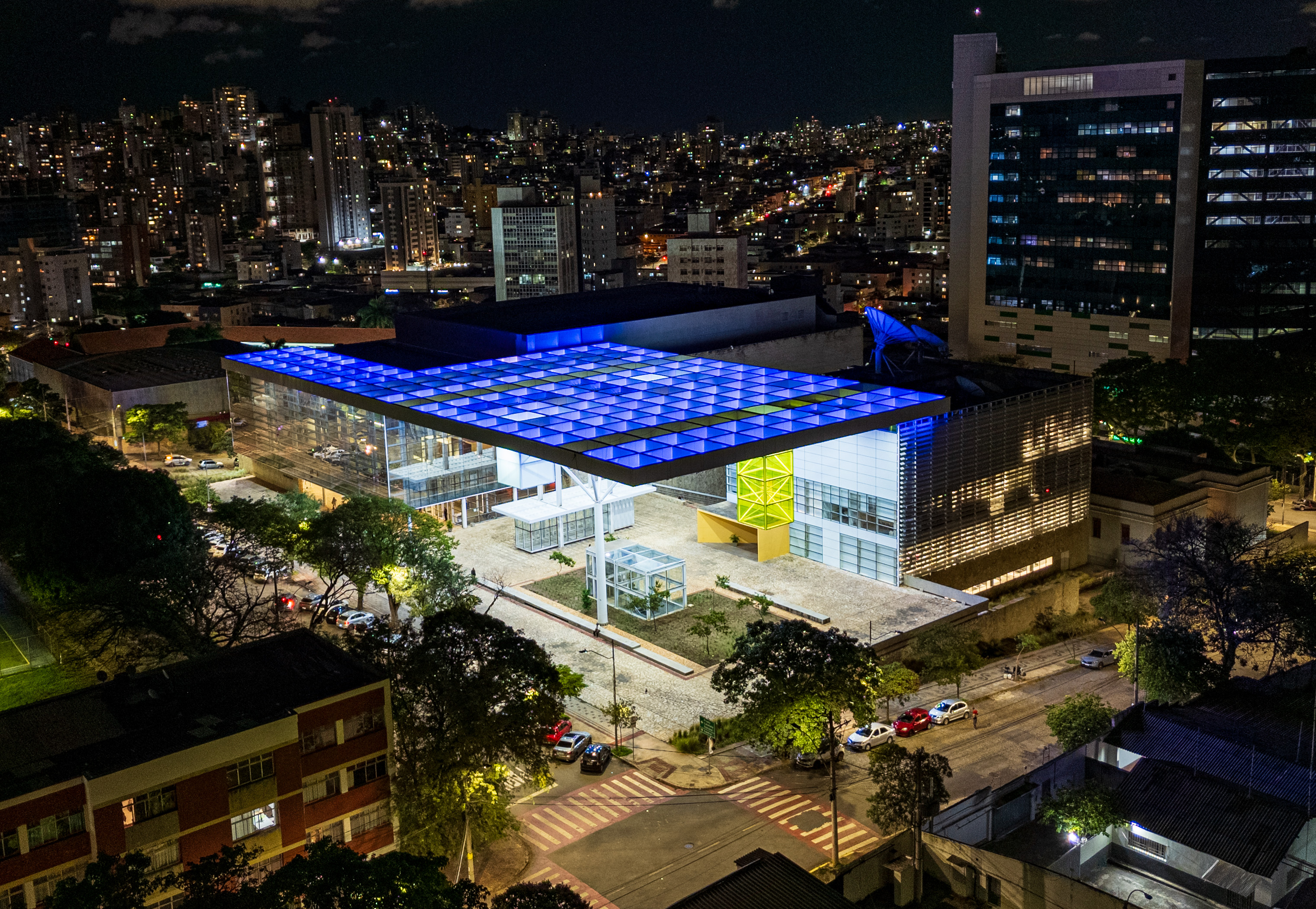
- Location: Brazil
- Coordinates: 19°55′37″S 43°57′24″W
- Website: www.secult.mg.gov.br/instituicoes/centro-de-cultura-itamar-franco
- Location of Centro de Cultura Presidente Itamar Franco

The President Itamar Franco Culture Center (Portuguese: Centro de Cultura Presidente Itamar Franco) is a cultural and institutional complex located in the Barro Preto neighborhood, in Belo Horizonte, Minas Gerais, Brazil. The Center houses the Sala Minas Gerais and the headquarters of the Minas Gerais Philharmonic Orchestra, as well as the gastronomic space Mineiraria, and the headquarters of Rede Minas and Rádio Inconfidência. The complex was designed by local architects Jô Vasconcellos and Rafael Yanni, with acoustic consultancy by José Augusto Nepomuceno for the concert hall.

== Development ==
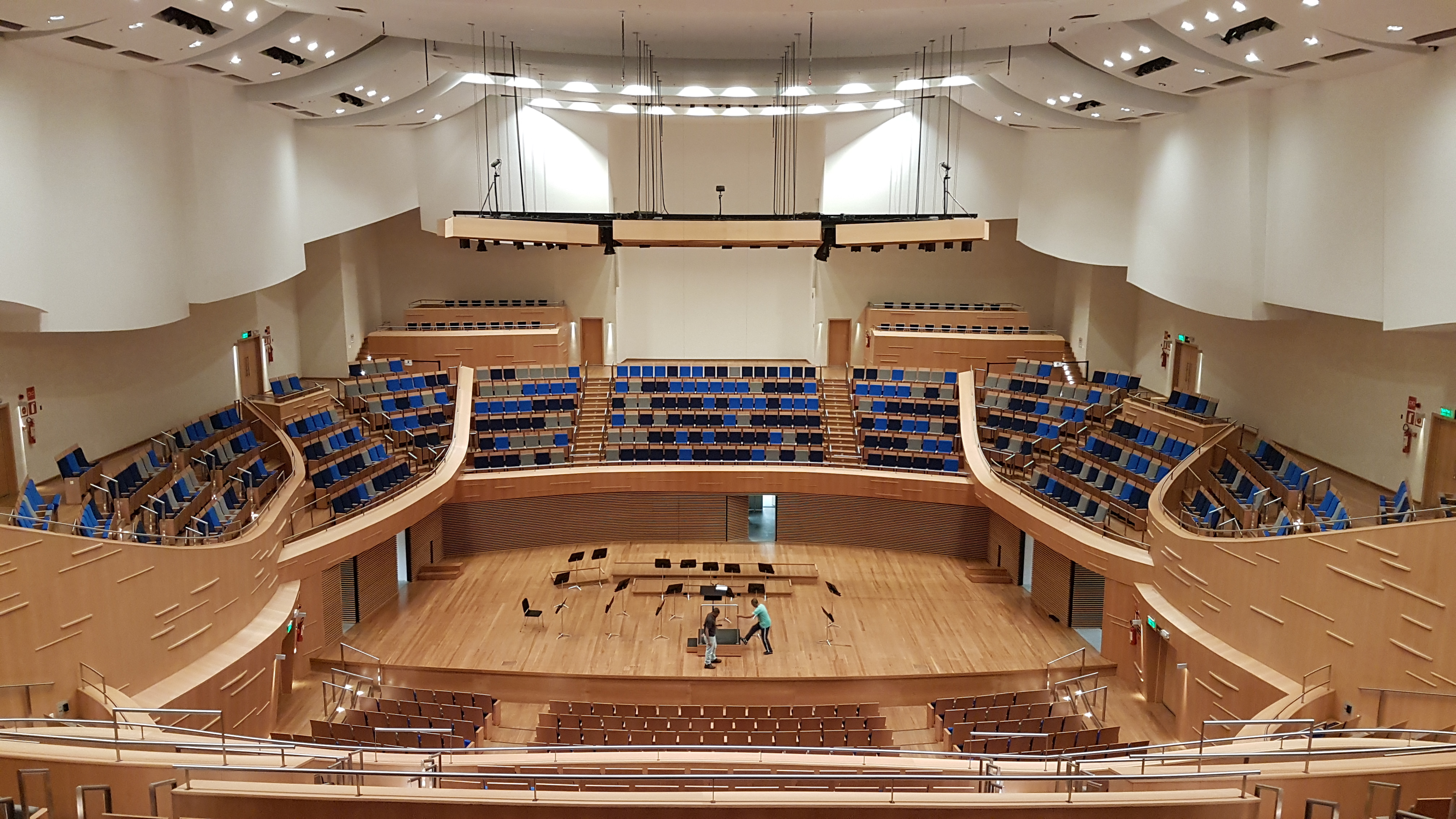
Interior of the Sala Minas Gerais, the main concert hall within the complex.

Construction of the Centro de Cultura began in 2011 and was inaugurated in 2015. The complex was designed by local architects Jô Vasconcellos and Rafael Yanni, and acoustics expert José Augusto Nepomuceno designed the interior of the Sala Minas Gerais. Its creation stems from the foundation, in 2008, of the Minas Gerais Philharmonic Orchestra, which, until the inauguration of the Sala Minas Gerais, performed predominantly at the Palácio das Artes, a public theater that was shared with other events. Due to the lack of a presentation venue dedicated to the institution, the orchestra missed about half of its potential performances due to scheduling clashes with other cultural events.

The building design is centered on the acoustic performance of the concert hall, which sits on natural terrain to avoid acoustic interference. Its shoebox shape stems from the desire to focus on the acoustics of the Classical period of classical music, in line with concert halls that set world benchmarks in acoustics.

During the development of the project it was decided that the complex would also house the headquarters of Rede Minas, a TV network, and Rádio Inconfidência, both belonging to the government of Minas Gerais. In 2020, a gastronomic center dedicated to food from Minas Gerais, called Mineiraria, was opened in a listed building within the complex.

== Privatization proposal ==
In 2022, the Government of Minas Gerais, within the scope of its actions to privatize the Minas Gerais Development Company (Codemge), announced the intention to sell several assets belonging to the public company, among which is the Cultural Center. The prospectus for the sale requires the maintenance of dates of the Sala Minas Gerais for the Philharmonic Orchestra, without detailing whether there would be a charge for the orchestra; and proposes charging rent from the communication companies headquartered in the complex.
