= Jô Vasconcellos =

Brazilian architect and urban planner

Maria Josefina de Vasconcellos
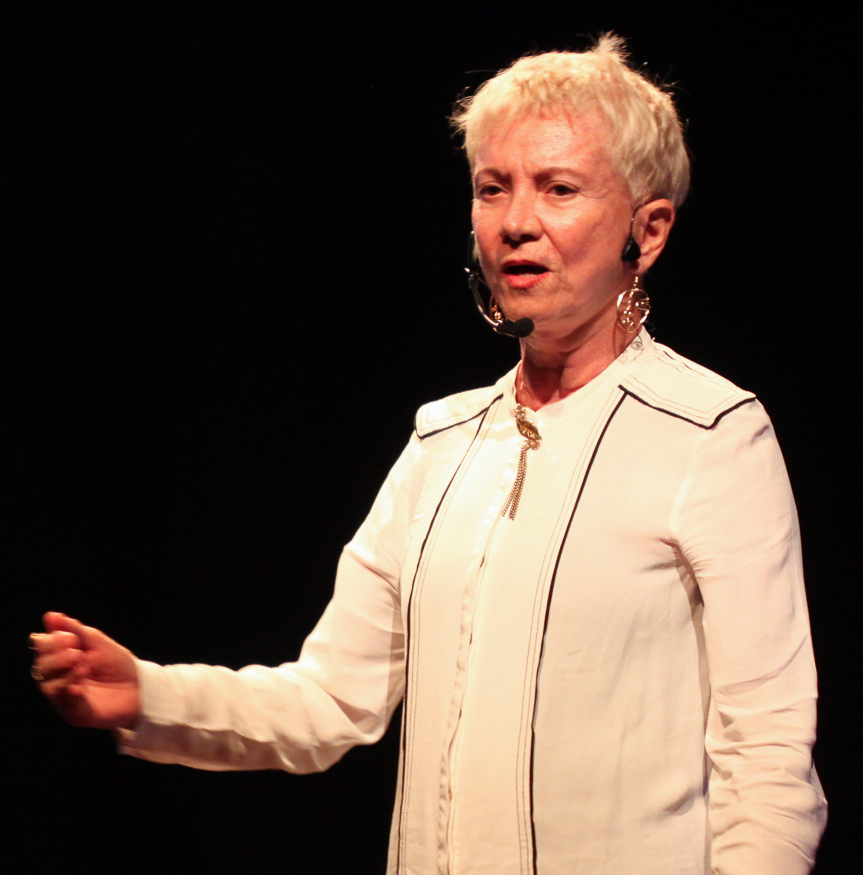
- Jô Vasconcellos during a TEDx Talk in 2019
- Born: 8 January 1947 (age 79); Belo Horizonte, Minas Gerais, Brazil
- Education: Federal University of Minas Gerais (UFMG)
- Occupation: Architect
- Notable work: Cachaça Museum, Espaço do Conhecimento, Centro de Cultura Presidente Itamar Franco
- Spouse: Éolo Maia (1981–2002)
- Practice: Jô Vasconcellos & Associados Architects

Maria Josefina de Vasconcellos, often referred to as Jô Vasconcellos (born 8 January 1947), is a Brazilian architect, urban planner, and landscape designer. She has designed several important buildings and complexes in the city of Belo Horizonte, including the Centro de Cultura Presidente Itamar Franco and the Rainha da Sucata Building

== Biography ==
Jô Vasconcellos was born in Belo Horizonte, the capital of the state of Minas Gerais, in the year 1947. She graduated from the Architecture program at the School of Architecture of the Federal University of Minas Gerais (UFMG), in the year of 1971. She is related to the architect and professor of the institution, Sylvio de Vasconcellos.

After her graduation, she pursued specialization in the field of landscaping in 1973, as well as in the restoration and conservation of monuments and historic sites. She was a part of the group known as the '3 Architects,' alongside Sylvio de Podestá and Éolo Maia. Gaining recognition in the city of Belo Horizonte, the trio established an architectural firm. By the late 1970s and early 1980s, they published three books titled '3 Architects,' which delved into Belo Horizonte's architecture and the group's perspectives on Brazilian architecture.

The group drew clear inspiration from international postmodernism, leading the book series to garner significant international attention and recognition. Given this alignment, historian Hugo Segawa coined the term "post-Mineiridade" to describe the group's approach.

In the year 2002, following the passing of Éolo Maia, she inaugurated the firm Jô Vasconcellos & Associados Architects. She was responsible for the projects of the Cachaça Museum, situated in Salinas, in the interior of Minas Gerais, and the Espaço do Conhecimento (Space of Knowledge) affiliated with UFMG. In 2005, she curated the exhibition "Éolo Maia: The Wind over the City," which was showcased in both Belo Horizonte and São Paulo. In 2015, she inaugurated the President Itamar Franco Culture Station, a project developed in collaboration with Rafael Yanni (in collaboration with José Augusto Nepomuceno for the acoustic design of the Sala Minas Gerais).

In 2019, she took part in a TEDxTalks event held at the Pontifical Catholic University of Minas Gerais (PUC-MG).

== Personal life ==
In addition to their professional partnership, Jô had a personal relationship with Éolo Maia, which lasted from 1981 until Maia's passing in 2002. Jô is responsible for keeping the memory and legacy of her late husband alive by organizing a series of exhibitions showcasing his work.
