= Divisa Alegre =

Brazilian municipality located in the northeast of the state of Minas Gerais

Coordinates: 15°43′45″S 41°20′50″W

- Municipality
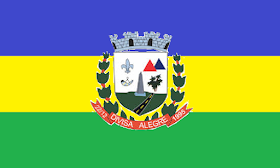
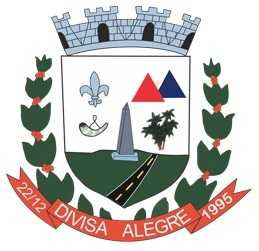
- Flag Coat of arms
- Interactive map of Divisa Alegre
- Country: Brazil
- State: Minas Gerais
- Region: Southeast
- Time zone: UTC−3 (BRT)

Location of Divisa Alegre in the state of Minas Gerais

Divisa Alegre is a Brazilian municipality located in the northeast of the state of Minas Gerais. As of 2020 the population was 6,868 in a total area of 118 km^{2} (46 sq mi).

The city belongs to the mesoregion of Jequitinhonha and to the microregion of Salinas. The elevation of the municipal seat is 975 meters. It became a municipality in 1997 separating from Águas Vermelhas This municipality is located on the important BR-116 highway on the boundary with the state of Bahia. The name means "Happy Boundary" in, because of the location on the state boundary.

Municipal boundaries are with: Águas Vermelhas, Pedra Azul, Encruzilhada and Cachoeira de Pajeú.

The main economic activities are cattle raising and farming. The GDP was R$28,807,000 (2005). There were no banking agencies in 2006. In the rural area there were 47 farms with around 150 people involved in the agricultural sector. Only two farms had tractors, a ratio of one tractor for every 23 farms. The main crops were coffee, bananas, sugarcane, beans, manioc, and corn. In the health sector there was 1 health clinic. The score on the Municipal Human Development Index was 0.656. This ranked Divisa Alegre 728 out of 853 municipalities in the state, with Poços de Caldas in first place with 0.841 and Setubinha in last place with 0.568. See Frigoletto for the complete list.

== See also ==
- List of municipalities in Minas Gerais
