= Taiobeiras =

Municipality in northern Minas Gerais, Brazil

- Municipality
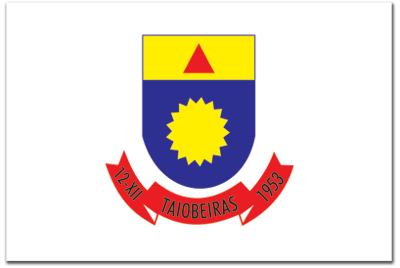
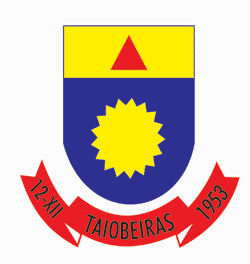
- Flag Coat of arms

- Location in Minas Gerais
- Coordinates (Municipal seat): 15°48′28″S 42°13′58″W
- Country: Brazil
- State: Minas Gerais
- Intermediate region: Montes Claros
- Immediate region: Salinas
- Municipality created: December 12, 1953
- Installed: January 1, 1954
- Districts: Taiobeiras and Mirandópolis

Government
  - Mayor: Danilo Mendes Rodrigues (UNIÃO)
  - Vice mayor: Vacant

Area
  - Total: 1,220.045 km^{2} (471.062 sq mi)

Population (2022 census)
  - Total: 33,050
  - Density: 27.09/km^{2} (70.16/sq mi)
- Demonym: Taiobeirense
- Time zone: UTC−3 (BRT)
- HDI (2010): 0.670
- IBGE code: 3168002
- Website: www.taiobeiras.mg.gov.br

Taiobeiras is a municipality in northern Minas Gerais, Brazil. It covers 1,220.045 km^{2} (471.062 sq mi) and had 33,050 residents in the 2022 census. The municipality has two districts, Taiobeiras and Mirandópolis, and belongs to the Immediate Geographic Region of Salinas and the Intermediate Geographic Region of Montes Claros.

The town grew from Sítio Bom Jardim, a settlement that developed along routes used by travelers and muleteers in the late nineteenth and early twentieth centuries. Taiobeiras became a district in 1911 and a municipality in 1953. The economy includes garment manufacturing, cassava farming, beekeeping, and ornamental-stone quarrying.

== History ==
Taiobeiras developed at Sítio Bom Jardim, a rural property where routes used by travelers and muleteers connected Teófilo Otoni, the interior of Bahia, Brejo das Almas, now Francisco Sá, and Montes Claros. Vitoriano Pereira da Costa had a chapel and cemetery built there. In 1875, Esperidião Gonçalves dos Santos, a priest from Rio Pardo de Minas, blessed the cemetery, and a cross was raised beside it. Vitoriano and his wife, Ana Severina de Jesus, donated part of the property for the settlement. After Vitoriano died in 1900, Ana sold the land to Martinho Antônio Rego, a Bahia tropeiro, born in 1851, whose family had settled at Sítio Bom Jardim in 1895. The purchases were completed in 1901 and 1910. Martinho opened the settlement's first cloth shop and established a general store in 1907. Houses and small shops gathered along what became Avenida da Liberdade. Local landowners paid for a channel that carried water from Córrego Bom Jardim.

Martinho served as a police delegate and local political leader, and in 1898 became the settlement's first representative on the municipal council of Rio Pardo de Minas. Martinho's son João Rego became a merchant and landowner. João's store sold general merchandise and textiles and had a gasoline pump. He helped found the Cooperativa dos Produtores Rurais de Taiobeiras, became its first president, donated lots to local institutions, and worked with Trajano Americano Mendes on the road toward Salinas. State Law No. 556 of August 30, 1911, made Taiobeiras a district of Rio Pardo. State Law No. 843 of September 7, 1923, transferred it to Salinas and changed its name to Bom Jardim de Taiobeiras. The district was renamed Taiobeiras in 1938.

State Law No. 1,039 of December 12, 1953, separated Taiobeiras from Salinas and created the municipality from the former district. The new municipality was installed on January 1, 1954. Its first electricity system began operating in 1955 from a small dam on the Grama River and supplied the town for two hours each evening. Work on the municipal market and a road from the municipal seat to Mirandópolis began in the municipality's first years.

Berizal became a district of Taiobeiras in 1962. It remained part of Taiobeiras until State Law No. 12,030 of December 21, 1995, created the municipality of Berizal. The new municipality was installed on January 1, 1997. Municipal Law No. 1,357 of November 7, 2018, created the district of Mirandópolis from the settlement of the same name.

== Geography ==
Taiobeiras is in northern Minas Gerais, in the Immediate Geographic Region of Salinas and the Intermediate Geographic Region of Montes Claros. The municipality covers 1,220.045 km^{2} (471.062 sq mi) and is divided into the districts of Taiobeiras and Mirandópolis. It borders Rio Pardo de Minas and Indaiabira to the north, Berizal and Curral de Dentro to the east, Salinas to the south, and Novorizonte to the west.

Broad, flat chapadas cover much of Taiobeiras. Metasedimentary rocks of the Nova Aurora and Salinas formations lie below the surface, while younger detrital deposits cover many uplands. Quartzite and metaconglomerate from the Salinas Formation are quarried for ornamental stone.

Taiobeiras straddles the Pardo and Jequitinhonha drainage basins. The Pardo basin covers 76.87 percent of the municipal territory and receives water from the Taiobeiras, Cercado, Tocão, Itaberaba and Covão streams. The remaining 23.13 percent drains toward the Jequitinhonha through watercourses that include the Taboqueiro and Grama rivers.

Rain falls mainly in the warmer months, while winters are dry. In the area covered by the Taiobeiras geological sheet, the mean annual temperature is 25.8 °C (78.4 °F), annual rainfall is about 820 millimetres (32 in), and average maximum temperatures are near 34 °C (93 °F). Parts of the municipality fall in the Cerrado and Atlantic Forest biomes. The municipal master plan calls for controls on deforestation, erosion, stream sedimentation, and damage from extractive activity. It also calls for restoration of streamside vegetation and springs.

== Demographics ==
=== Population ===
The 2022 census counted 33,050 residents in Taiobeiras, or 27.09 inhabitants per square kilometer. The estimated population was 34,537 on July 1, 2025.

Census population
Year	Population	Change from preceding census
2000	27,347	Not applicable
2010	30,917	+13.1%
2022	33,050	+6.9%

Population growth slowed after 2010. In that year's census, 25,060 residents lived in urban areas and 5,857 lived in rural areas. The urban share was 81.1 percent.

=== Population profile ===
Taiobeiras had 16,133 men and 16,917 women in 2022, equivalent to 95.4 men for every 100 women. The median age rose from 28 in 2010 to 35 in 2022. Residents younger than 15 were 19.6 percent of the population. Those aged 60 or older were 16.9 percent.

The 2022 census used self-declared color or race categories.

Self-declared color or race, 2022
Category	Population	Share
Pardo	20,486	61.98%
White	10,046	30.40%
Black	2,472	7.48%
Asian	28	0.08%
Indigenous	18	0.05%

The literacy rate among residents aged 15 or older rose from 82.3 percent in 2010 to 86.3 percent in 2022. Of the 26,573 people in this age group in 2022, 22,930 could read and write a simple note.

== Economy ==
Taiobeiras had a gross domestic product of R$705.4 million in 2023. GDP per capita was R$21,342.59.

Garment manufacturing has grown into one of Taiobeiras's main industrial activities, centered on lingerie, swimwear, sportswear, and protective clothing. Minas Gerais recognized the local industry as a productive arrangement in 2021. By late 2025, Taiobeiras had about 122 garment businesses, which together generated around 450 direct jobs and R$25 million in annual revenue. About 96 percent of the businesses were led by women, and 35 belonged to the Associação de Moda Íntima e Praia de Taiobeiras (AMIP).

Public investment has accompanied the growth of the industry. Since 2021, the Development Company of the São Francisco and Parnaíba Valleys (Codevasf) has spent more than R$11 million on machinery, training, trade fairs, technical assistance, and new facilities for the local garment sector. The Quarteirão da Moda opened in December 2025 as a dedicated area for clothing businesses, with the Escola da Moda and a convention center forming part of the development. The Escola da Moda and convention center received R$5.57 million in federal investment. The school provides vocational training for the clothing industry, while the convention center gives Taiobeiras a permanent venue for fairs and business events.

Technical assistance has also focused on improving production inside the factories. In 2025, the FIEMG reported that garment businesses receiving Lean Manufacturing consulting had increased productivity by 63 percent over ten months, while turnover in the sector rose by 17 percent.

Outside the town, smaller agricultural and extractive businesses add another layer to the local economy. Family farmers in the rural community of Cercado grow cassava and process it into flour, starch, baked foods, and animal feed. Taiobeiras gives its name to a local beekeeping network that also includes Indaiabira and Rio Pardo de Minas. Part of the municipality falls within the registered Região de Salinas geographical indication for cachaça. Quartzite and metaconglomerate are quarried for ornamental stone.

== Politics and government ==
=== Formation of municipal government ===
Before Taiobeiras became a municipality, the settlement was represented politically on the councils of the municipalities to which it belonged. Martinho Antônio Rego, who had acquired land within what is now Taiobeiras, also served as a police delegate and became an early political leader of the settlement. In 1898, he was elected to the Municipal Council of Rio Pardo de Minas, where he represented Taiobeiras.

The creation of a separate municipality was discussed for years while Taiobeiras remained part of Salinas. In 1943, João, Maciel, and Teófilo Rego were among the local leaders campaigning for municipal autonomy, together with Trajano Americano Mendes and Antonino Almeida. They opposed a political group in Salinas led by Idalino Ribeiro, which resisted the separation of the district. An attempt to create the municipality progressed within the state government that year, but Taiobeiras was left out of the administrative reorganization approved in December. The campaign was later resumed, and Taiobeiras became a municipality under State Law No. 1,039 of December 12, 1953.

Taiobeiras began governing itself when the municipality was installed on January 1, 1954. The state government appointed Lídio Ituassu as its first municipal administrator. At the reception held for the new administrator, Eusa Rego gave a speech on behalf of the women of Taiobeiras. Ituassu was succeeded in July by Oswaldo Costa, known as Vadim Costa, who remained in office until January 1955. Lúcio José Miranda took office that year as the municipality's first elected mayor. The Municipal Council also began operating during this period. Francisco Nogueira was its first president, serving from 1955 to 1957, and José Mendes Rego succeeded him in 1958.

Some mayors returned to office for separate terms. Uilton Costa Mendes served three times, from 1959 to 1962, from 1967 to 1970, and from 1974 to 1977. Joel da Cruz Santos governed from 1978 to 1982, returned from 1989 to 1992, and took office again in 1997 before being reelected to the term beginning in 2001. Joel resigned in 2002 to run for the state legislature, and vice mayor João Emílio Arifa Silva completed the term through 2004. Maria Matos de Sena, who served from 1993 to 1996, was the first woman to become mayor of Taiobeiras.

Since 2005, the mayor's office has alternated between Denerval Germano da Cruz and Danilo Mendes Rodrigues. Denerval served two consecutive terms from 2005 to 2012. Danilo, who had been elected to the Municipal Council in 2008 and served as council president from 2011 to 2012, was mayor from 2013 to 2020. Denerval returned to the mayor's office in 2021 and was reelected in 2024.

=== Municipal government ===
Taiobeiras adopted its current municipal charter, the Lei Orgânica, on October 27, 1990, after the adoption of the 1988 Constitution of Brazil. It had been amended twelve times by 2022. The charter divides municipal government between executive and legislative branches. Executive authority is exercised by the mayor, assisted by the vice mayor and municipal secretaries. Legislative authority belongs to the 13-member Municipal Council, whose members are elected to four-year terms.

The size of the Municipal Council has changed since the municipality was created. A court ruling reduced the council from thirteen to nine members in 1997. An amendment to the municipal charter adopted in 1999 restored thirteen seats, which has remained the size of the council in subsequent terms.

The Municipal Council passes local legislation and votes on taxation, the municipal budget, planning, and other matters under municipal jurisdiction. It also oversees budget execution and reviews the mayor's annual accounts after receiving a preliminary opinion from the Court of Accounts of the State of Minas Gerais. Council meetings are open to the public except in the circumstances provided for by the municipal charter.

Residents also have several forms of direct participation in municipal government. A popular-initiative bill may be introduced with signatures from at least five percent of the municipality's registered voters. Before voting on such a proposal, the Municipal Council must hold a public hearing at which representatives of the petitioners can speak. The charter also provides for a Tribuna Livre, or open public forum, through which residents and representatives of associations, unions, and other organizations may address ordinary council sessions. Municipal questions may also be submitted to voters through plebiscites or referendums.

The mayor's administration consists of the mayor's office, the municipal legal office, the comptroller-general's office, and the municipal departments. Its organization was restructured by Law No. 1,516 in 2024 and later amended. The administration has eleven departments covering planning and management, infrastructure and urban planning, health, education, social assistance, urban services, finance, agriculture and the environment, economic development, tourism, innovation, science and technology, culture, and sports, recreation and youth.

=== Recent elections ===
Denerval Germano da Cruz returned to the mayor's office in the 2020 election as the candidate of the Brazilian Social Democracy Party (PSDB). He received 10,987 votes, or 58.47 percent of valid ballots. Carlito Pereira da Costa of the Democratic Labour Party (PDT) finished second with 7,245 votes, or 38.55 percent.

In the 2024 municipal election, Denerval ran for reelection with Danilo Mendes Rodrigues as his running mate for vice mayor. The mayoral race had two candidates. Denerval received 16,744 votes, or 87.36 percent of valid ballots, while Jaime Peninha of the Liberal Party (PL) received 2,422 votes, or 12.64 percent. Of 27,075 registered voters, 20,801 voted and 6,274 abstained, giving an abstention rate of 23.17 percent.

2024 mayoral election
Candidate	Party	Votes	%
Denerval Germano da Cruz	PSDB	16,744	87.36
Jaime Peninha	PL	2,422	12.64

The same election filled the thirteen seats on the Municipal Council for the 2025–2028 term. The PSDB won three seats. Progressistas (PP), the Social Democratic Party (PSD), and Brazil Union (UNIÃO) each won two, while the PDT, PL, Democratic Renewal Party (PRD), and Green Party (PV) each won one.

Party composition elected for 2025–2028
Party	Seats
PSDB	3
PP	2
PSD	2
UNIÃO	2
PDT	1
PL	1
PRD	1
PV	1

For the 2025–2026 term, Alessandro Corrêa Brito was elected president of the Municipal Council, with Maria Izabel Pereira Matos as vice president. Edilson Barbosa dos Santos serves as first secretary and Silvano Ferreira as second secretary.

Denerval and Danilo took office as mayor and vice mayor on January 1, 2025. Denerval resigned on April 1, 2026. As vice mayor, Danilo succeeded him the same day during a formal session of the Municipal Council. The office of vice mayor remained vacant after the succession.

== Education ==
João and Teófilo Rego arranged for one of the settlement's early teachers to come from Bahia. The Municipal Education Secretariat runs the municipal school network. The Municipal Education Council was created in 2011 to advise on education policy and review school access, enrollment, grade progression, dropout, and education spending. A ten-year Municipal Education Plan enacted in 2015 set targets through 2025 for early-childhood and basic education, teacher training, inclusive education, vocational study, and school transport.

State and municipal schools offer technical education. In the second half of 2025, Escola Estadual Oswaldo Lucas Mendes offered an evening nursing technician course. The municipal Escola Técnica de Educação Profissional began classes in July 2026 with a dental health technician course organized by the municipal education and health secretariats.

Taiobeiras has an in-person support center in the Universidade Aberta do Brasil system. In the first half of 2026, the Federal University of the Jequitinhonha and Mucuri Valleys offered a distance-learning bachelor's degree in public administration through the center.

== Health ==
Teófilo Rego, who trained in dentistry in Juiz de Fora, was the first dentist to practice in Taiobeiras. The Municipal Health Secretariat runs local services within the Unified Health System. In August 2026, the municipal network had 14 primary-care units, including clinics for rural communities. The network also had a clinical laboratory, a physiotherapy clinic, dental and specialized-care centers, a Farmácia de Minas, and two psychosocial care centers. The municipal supply center, the Farmácia de Minas, and pharmacies at some primary-care units provide medicines through the public health system.

Fundação Taiobeiras maintains Hospital Santo Antônio, a general hospital under municipal management that operates around the clock. The hospital provides maternity and neonatal care, inpatient and outpatient treatment, and diagnostic services. A clinical oncology extension of the Santa Casa de Montes Claros was accredited in 2023 to treat patients from Taiobeiras and nine surrounding municipalities.

Emergency medical care includes basic and advanced SAMU mobile units based in the municipality. Some treatments are provided elsewhere through regional referrals. Hemodialysis for residents of the Taiobeiras and Salinas health regions is provided in Salinas, while other specialized treatment may require travel to Montes Claros.

== Transportation ==
The municipal seat lies at the junction of MG-404, LMG-602, and LMG-626. MG-404 connects Taiobeiras with Salinas to the south. LMG-602 runs toward São João do Paraíso, while LMG-626 extends west toward Rio Pardo de Minas and east through Mirandópolis toward Curral de Dentro. LMG-625 connects Mirandópolis with Berizal. In 2025, the state contracted improvements and paving along a 17.88 km (11.11 mi) section of LMG-626 between Curral de Dentro and Mirandópolis.

The municipal bus terminal handles regional and long-distance services. Transnorte runs direct buses from Taiobeiras to Salinas, Montes Claros, Belo Horizonte, São João do Paraíso, Teófilo Otoni, and Vitória da Conquista in Bahia. Viação Exdil also connects Taiobeiras with neighboring Berizal. The municipal master plan provides for local and urban routes to meet intermunicipal services at the terminal.

Taiobeiras had 30,237 registered motor vehicles in December 2025. Motorcycles were the largest class, with 11,853 registrations, followed by 9,445 automobiles. The fleet also included 3,196 pickup trucks, 1,849 motor scooters, 1,408 trucks, and 384 buses.

The private Municipal de Taiobeiras Aerodrome has the ICAO airport code SITA.

== Public services and communications ==
Taiobeiras adopted a Municipal Basic Sanitation Plan in 2022 covering drinking water, sewerage, stormwater drainage, urban cleaning, and solid waste. Companhia de Saneamento de Minas Gerais (Copasa) operates the water and sewer systems in the district seat. Copanor holds the service contract for Mirandópolis and operated its water system there in 2021.

The sanitation plan was revised in 2025 using 2024 data. Water service reached 86.6 percent of residents, while the water-coverage indicator stood at 99.3 percent. Sewer service reached 69.5 percent, with a coverage indicator of 92.8 percent. The plan set targets of 99 percent for water service and 90 percent for sewerage by the end of 2033. In July 2026, the municipality designated a 10,000 m^{2} (2.5 acres) site in Mirandópolis for a planned sewage treatment plant.

In 2013, Taiobeiras joined Berizal, Indaiabira, Ninheira, Rio Pardo de Minas, and São João do Paraíso to form the Alto Rio Pardo Intermunicipal Solid Waste Management Consortium, known as CIGRESARP. The consortium was created to plan and provide waste services for its member municipalities.

Cemig Distribuição supplies electricity. The municipality manages street lighting, financed through a charge on electricity bills. Correios operates a post office in the municipal seat. In 2025, the Municipal Council signed an agreement with the federal Chamber of Deputies to install and operate a digital television transmitter under the Brasil Digital program.

== Parks and recreation ==
Praça Tiradentes is a public square in central Taiobeiras. The municipality installed children's playground equipment there in 2023.

The Parque de Eventos Vereador João Cocá lies beside LMG-602 in the Bom Jardim neighborhood and is used for fairs, cultural events, and sports. In 2022, the municipality designated an adjoining 115,423.21 m^{2} (28.52170 acres) property for its expansion. The municipality opened a tender to renovate and enlarge the grounds in June 2026.

The 2006 municipal master plan envisioned the Taiobeiras stream as a green corridor through the town. It called for a linear park along the stream, with restored riverbanks, open areas for recreation and flood protection, access roads, and bridges. Further linear parks were planned between Barragem de Cima and Lagoa do Meio.

== Culture ==
=== Cultural institutions and heritage ===
The Centro Cultural Maciel do Rego was founded in 1991 as a nonprofit cultural association. Its activities have included craft fairs, theater and capoeira programs, support for the Festival of Popular Culture of the Jequitinhonha Valley (Festivale), and three editions of FESTÂIO, a festival devoted to art and culture from northern Minas Gerais. The municipality recognized the association as a public-utility organization in 1991.

Taiobeiras created the Municipal Council of Cultural Policy and the Municipal Culture Fund in 2013. The council reviews cultural policy, helps organize municipal culture conferences, and approves spending from the fund. The Culture Secretariat maintains the Professora Zenilde Costa Mota Maia Public Library and the official municipal band.

The Municipal Cultural Heritage Council oversees local inventories, protection proceedings, and proposed changes to protected properties. The protected Núcleo Histórico Santo Cruzeiro dos Martírios contains a wooden cross with objects representing the Instruments of the Passion, a small chapel, a pequi tree, and Praça Abel Costa de Araújo. Casa Haydée, on Avenida da Liberdade, received municipal protection in 2018. The Levantamento de Bandeiras Festivas, the local custom of raising festive flags, received municipal protection as intangible cultural property in 2022.

Maciel Rego, a son of Martinho and a native of Taiobeiras, worked as a traveling photographer in the region and taught himself to play the violin. He also took part in the campaign for municipal emancipation. His daughter Eusa Rego Freire graduated in architecture from the Federal University of Minas Gerais in 1962 and later worked as an architect for the municipal government of Lisbon, Portugal. She also wrote poetry. Her collection O Corpo was reviewed by Ana Hatherly in Colóquio/Letras in 1980, and she contributed to the Lisbon arts and letters journal SEMA. Alcindo Rego, a son of Téofilo, born in the city in 1916, founded and directed the newspaper Correio do Oeste and served on the municipal council of São Gotardo from 1959 to 1962 and mayor of Rio Espera.

=== Religion ===
The Catholic Church in Taiobeiras is part of the Archdiocese of Montes Claros. The Parish of Saint Sebastian is based at the Church of Saint Sebastian on Praça da Matriz and belongs to the Saint Sebastian Deanery.

Spiritism was also present in Taiobeiras during the early years of the settlement. João and Teófilo Rego were among the town's early Spiritists. The first local center, Joanna d'Arc, met in a house owned by Teófilo on Avenida da Liberdade. João donated land for the Centro Espírita Fé, Amor e Caridade, later called Casa Espírita Allan Kardec.

=== Festivals and community events ===
The annual Festa do Pequi is held in the rural community of Lagoa Grande. Its 31st edition took place from March 6 to 8, 2026. Events have included music, a cycling ride, a horseback procession, and a pequi-eating competition.

The Feira Noturna Itinerante, known as FENOIT, has been held on Wednesdays since 2019. The night market moves among public squares, with local crafts, food, farm products, and performances by regional musicians. The Festa de Maio is held with the Feira Regional do Alto Rio Pardo, or FERARP. In 2025, the 68th Festa de Maio and 17th FERARP had concerts and exhibitions by farmers, manufacturers, merchants, and community organizations.

=== Sports ===
Municipal sports grounds include the Osvaldo Costa sports square, the Aldemi Alves dos Santos gymnasium, and public courts in Bom Jardim, Lagoa Dourada, Mirandópolis, Planalto, Santo Cruzeiro, and central Taiobeiras. The municipal football championship is played at Estádio São Sebastião, also called Minas.

The Jogos Estudantis de Taiobeiras are school competitions in futsal, volleyball, basketball, dodgeball, peteca, running, chess, and swimming. In June 2026, the municipality opened a tender for the renovation and enlargement of the football stadium in Mirandópolis.

== Public safety ==
The Military Police of Minas Gerais State maintains its 2nd Independent Military Police Company in Taiobeiras. The Civil Police of Minas Gerais operates its 4th Regional Police Delegation in the municipality. A police station specializing in crimes against women and an integrated forensic post opened at the regional delegation in March 2025. The forensic post carries out criminal examinations and medico-legal work for Taiobeiras and neighboring municipalities.

The Municipal Public Safety Council was created in 2019. It brings municipal agencies, police, and community organizations together to set local priorities and propose prevention programs. A municipal public-safety fund administered by the council can pay for equipment, training, facilities, information systems, and prevention projects.

Municipal civil defense is part of the mayor's office. It monitors weather alerts, prepares contingency plans, coordinates assistance during disasters, and works on prevention and recovery.

== Notable people ==
- Marina Sena, born in 1996, is a singer and songwriter from Taiobeiras. She first performed with A Outra Banda da Lua and Rosa Neon before releasing her debut solo album, De Primeira, in 2021. The São Paulo Association of Art Critics named her its breakthrough artist in popular music for 2021.

== See also ==
- List of municipalities in Minas Gerais
