= Santo Antônio do Retiro =

City in the northeast of the Brazilian state of Minas Gerais

Coordinates: 15°20′21″S 42°37′17″W

- Municipality
- Interactive map of Santo Antônio do Retiro
- Country: Brazil
- State: Minas Gerais
- Region: Southeast
- Time zone: UTC−3 (BRT)

Location of Santo Antônio do Retiro in the state of Minas Gerais

Santo Antônio do Retiro is a city in the northeast of the Brazilian state of Minas Gerais. In 2020 its population was estimated to be 7,297 in a total area of 797 km^{2} (308 sq mi).

The city belongs to the mesoregion of Jequitinhonha and to the microregion of Salinas. The elevation of the municipal seat is 815 meters. It became a municipality in 1997. This municipality is located between Rio Pardo de Minas and Espinosa on the upper reaches of the Rio Pardo. The distance to the state capital was 680 km.

Municipal boundaries are with: Espinosa, Monte Azul, Mato Verde, Rio Pardo de Minas and Montezuma.

The main economic activities are cattle raising and farming. The GDP was R$16,388,000 (2005). There were no banking agencies in 2006. There were 104 automobiles in 2007, a ratio of one for every 68 people. In the rural area there were 777 farms (2006) with around 2,800 people involved in the agricultural sector. There were 10 tractors, a ratio of one tractor for every 77 farms. The main crops were coffee, sugarcane, beans, manioc, and corn. In the health sector there were 5 health clinics and no hospital. The score on the Municipal Human Development Index was 0.602. This ranked Santo Antônio do Retiro 833 out of 853 municipalities in the state, with Poços de Caldas in first place with 0.841 and Setubinha in last place with 0.568.

== See also ==
- List of municipalities in Minas Gerais
