= São João do Paraíso =

City in the northeast of the Brazilian state of Minas Gerais

Coordinates: 15°18′48″S 42°00′54″W

- Municipality
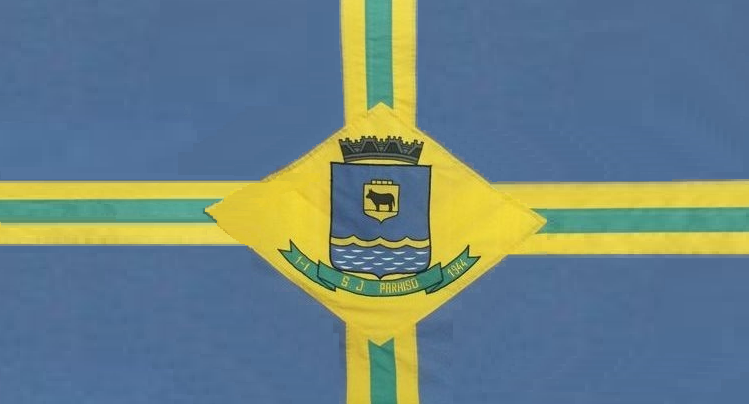
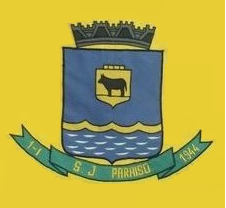
- Flag Coat of arms
- Interactive map of São João do Paraíso
- Country: Brazil
- State: Minas Gerais
- Region: Southeast
- Time zone: UTC−3 (BRT)

Location of São João do Paraíso in the state of Minas Gerais

São João do Paraíso is a city in the northeast of the Brazilian state of Minas Gerais. In 2020 its population was estimated to be 23,709 in a total area of 1,921 km^{2}.

The city belongs to the mesoregion of Jequitinhonha and to the microregion of Salinas. The elevation of the municipal seat is 780 meters. It became a municipality in 1943. This municipality is located north of the Rio Pardo and forms a boundary with the state of Bahia. It is crossed by the Rio São João, a tributary of the Rio Pardo.

Distances to important cities: Belo Horizonte - 746 km, Montes Claros – 328 km, Taiobeiras - 71 km, Brasília - 1022 km, São Paulo - 1330 km, and Vitória da Conquista - 220 km.

Most of the population lived in the rural areas. The breakdown was as follows: Urban: 8,231 (39.18%) and Rural: 12,779 (60.82%).

Municipal boundaries are with: the state of Bahia, Montezuma, Taiobeiras, Indaiabira, Vargem Grande do Rio Pardo, Berizal, Águas Vermelhas, and Ninheira.

The main economic activities are cattle raising and farming. The GDP was R$71,441,000 (2005). There was 01 banking agency in 2006. There were 691 automobiles in 2007, a ratio of one for every 30 people. In the rural area there were 2,909 farms (2006)with around 8,000 people involved in the agricultural sector. There were 51 tractors, a ratio of one tractor for every 60 farms. The main crops were coffee, bananas, sugarcane, beans, manioc, and corn. In the health sector there were 7 health clinics and 01 hospital with 78 beds. The score on the Municipal Human Development Index was 0.644. This ranked Sao João do Paraíso 762 out of 853 municipalities in the state, with Poços de Caldas in first place with 0.841 and Setubinha in last place with 0.568.

== See also ==
- List of municipalities in Minas Gerais
