= Josenópolis =

Human settlement in Brazil

Coordinates: 16°32′49″S 42°30′54″W

- Municipality
- Interactive map of Josenópolis
- Country: Brazil
- State: Minas Gerais
- Region: Southeast
- Time zone: UTC−3 (BRT)

Location of Josenópolis within the state of Minas Gerais

Josenópolis is a Brazilian municipality located in the north of the state of Minas Gerais. In 2020 the population was 4,889 in a total area of 536 km^{2}. It became a municipality in 1997.

== Geography ==
Josenópolis is located in the foothills of the Serra do Espinhaço mountains southeast of Montes Claros at an elevation of 692 meters. It is north of the Rio Jequitinhonha and is connected by dirt road to other population centers. The Rio Vacaria, a tributary of the Rio Jequitinhonha, flows into the Jequitinhonha. Neighboring municipalities are: Grão Mogol, Padre Carvalho, and Coronel Murta.

Josenópolis is part of the statistical microregion of Grão Mogol.

== Economic activities ==
The most important economic activities are cattle raising (4,000 head in 2006) and subsistence agriculture. The GDP in 2005 was R$ 10,399,000. The most important agricultural crops are bananas, coffee, peanuts, sugarcane, and corn. In the rural area there were 446 producers. The total area of agricultural land was 15,000 hectares in 2006, of which 1,000 ha. were in crops. As of 2006 there were only 02 tractors. In the urban area there were no banking agencies in 2006.

== Health and education ==
This municipality is isolated from major population centers and suffers from drought and poor soils.

- Municipal Human Development Index: .610 (2000)
- State ranking: 819 out of 853 municipalities as of 2000
- National ranking: 4,485 out of 5,138 municipalities as of 2000

The highest ranking municipality in Minas Gerais in 2000 was Poços de Caldas with 0.841, while the lowest was Setubinha with 0.568. Nationally the highest was São Caetano do Sul in São Paulo with 0.919, while the lowest was Setubinha.

- Degree of urbanization: 47.50% (2000)
- Infant mortality rate: 24.39 (2000) The rate for Minas Gerais was 17.40; the rate for Brazil was 18.91.
- Illiteracy rate: 40.62% (15 years old or older) (Data from 2000) The rate for Minas Gerais was 11.96; the rate for Brazil was 13.63
- Urban area covered by sewage system: 1.50%--the rate for Minas Gerais was 81.39%
- Health centers and hospitals: 01 health center. There were no hospitals.

== See also ==
- List of municipalities in Minas Gerais
