= Vargem Grande do Rio Pardo =

- Location in Minas Gerais
- Coordinates: 15°15′20″S 42°13′00″W
- Country: Brazil
- Region: Southeast
- State: Minas Gerais

Government
  - Mayor: Virgilo Costa (DEM)

Population (2020)
  - Total: 5,026
- Time zone: UTC−3 (BRT)

Vargem Grande do Rio Pardo is a municipality in the northeast of the Brazilian state of Minas Gerais.

== Geography ==
Vargem Grande do Rio Pardo has a total area of 494 km². The elevation is 800 meters. It became a municipality in 1997. It is part of the statistical microregion of Salinas and lies between BR-251 and the boundary with the state of Bahia. Neighboring municipalities are: Indaiabira, São João do Paraíso, Montezuma, and Novorizonte.

The municipality contains about 16% of the 38,177 hectares (94,340 acres) Nascentes Geraizeiras Sustainable Development Reserve, created in 2014. The reserve protects an area of the cerrado biome.

== Demographics ==
As of 2020 the population was 5,026. This is one of the poorest municipalities in the state and in the country. Isolation and drought mean that most of the inhabitants live in extreme poverty. The main economic activities are cattle raising (1,200 head in 2006) and farming with modest production of coffee and mangoes, and corn. In 2006 there were 640 rural producers in a total area of 48,347 hectares. Cropland made up 37,000 hectares. There were only 43 tractors. In the urban area there were no financial institutions as of 2006. There were 72 automobiles (2007), giving a ratio of about one automobile for every 65 inhabitants. Health care was provided by 3 public health clinics. There were no hospitals. The GDP in 2003 was R$13,548,952.00 while the GDP per capita was R$2,865.68.

=== Human Development Index ===
- Municipal Human Development Index: .598 (2000)
- State ranking: 838 out of 853 municipalities as of 2000
- National ranking: 4,700 out of 5,138 municipalities as of 2000
- Life expectancy: 60
- Literacy rate: 65
- Combined primary, secondary and tertiary gross enrollment ratio: .795
- Per capita income (monthly): R$79.60 (For the complete list see Frigoletto)

Note that at last count Brazil had 5,561 municipalities while Minas Gerais still had 853.

The above figures can be compared with those of Poços de Caldas, which had an MHDI of .841, the highest in the state of Minas Gerais. The highest MHDI in the country (2000) was São Caetano do Sul in the state of São Paulo with an MHDI of .919. More up-to-date data from 2004 show that the lowest in that year was Manari in the state of Pernambuco with an MHDI of .467 out of a total of 5504 municipalities in the country as of 2004. At last count Brazil had 5,561 municipalities so this might have changed at the time of this writing. See Frigoletto

== See also ==
- List of municipalities in Minas Gerais

== Sources ==
- RDS Nascentes Geraizeiras (in Portuguese), ISA: Instituto Socioambiental
