= Sala Minas Gerais =

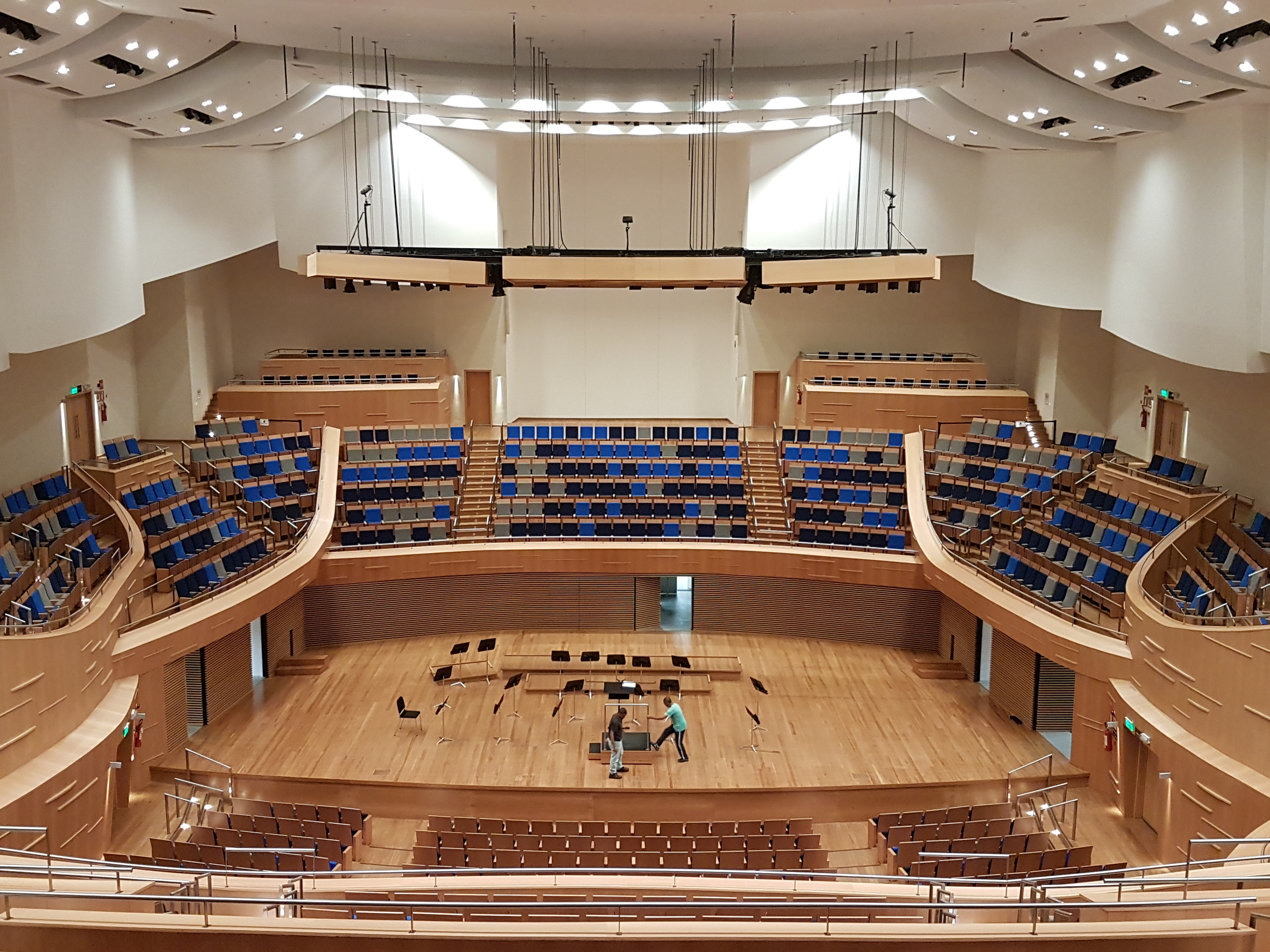
- Location: Brazil

Sala Minas Gerais is a concert hall in Belo Horizonte, Minas Gerais, Brazil. Inaugurated in 2015, it was designed and built especially to serve as the headquarters of the Minas Gerais Philharmonic Orchestra. It has an area of 32,464m² and a capacity of 1,477 spectators, with areas for orchestra and choir. The room features variable acoustic resources - such as sail-shaped diffuser walls, ceiling diffusers and absorbent chairs - and was designed internally by architect José Augusto Nepomuceno. The building is a part of the Centro de Cultura Presidente Itamar Franco, a cultural center designed by architects Jô Vasconcellos and Rafael Yanni.

Since February 2015, Sala Minas Gerais has hosted concerts from the regular series of the Minas Gerais Philharmonic Orchestra.

== Development ==
The Minas Gerais Philharmonic Orchestra was founded in 2008, with intentions of building its own concert hall. The design of the building was made public in August 2011, as well as its location - a block owned by the State in Barro Preto, a central borough of Belo Horizonte. Construction began in 2013. The complex also included the headquarters of Rádio Inconfidência and Rede Minas, state owned radio station and TV station, respectively, for a total built area of over 41,000 m^{2}.

The opening of Sala Minas Gerais took place even before the release of permit after a final inspection by the Fire Department, but with a provisional operating permit and fire brigade that allowed regular operation. As informed by the fire department, there was no restriction in this case because it is a public building.

== Architecture ==
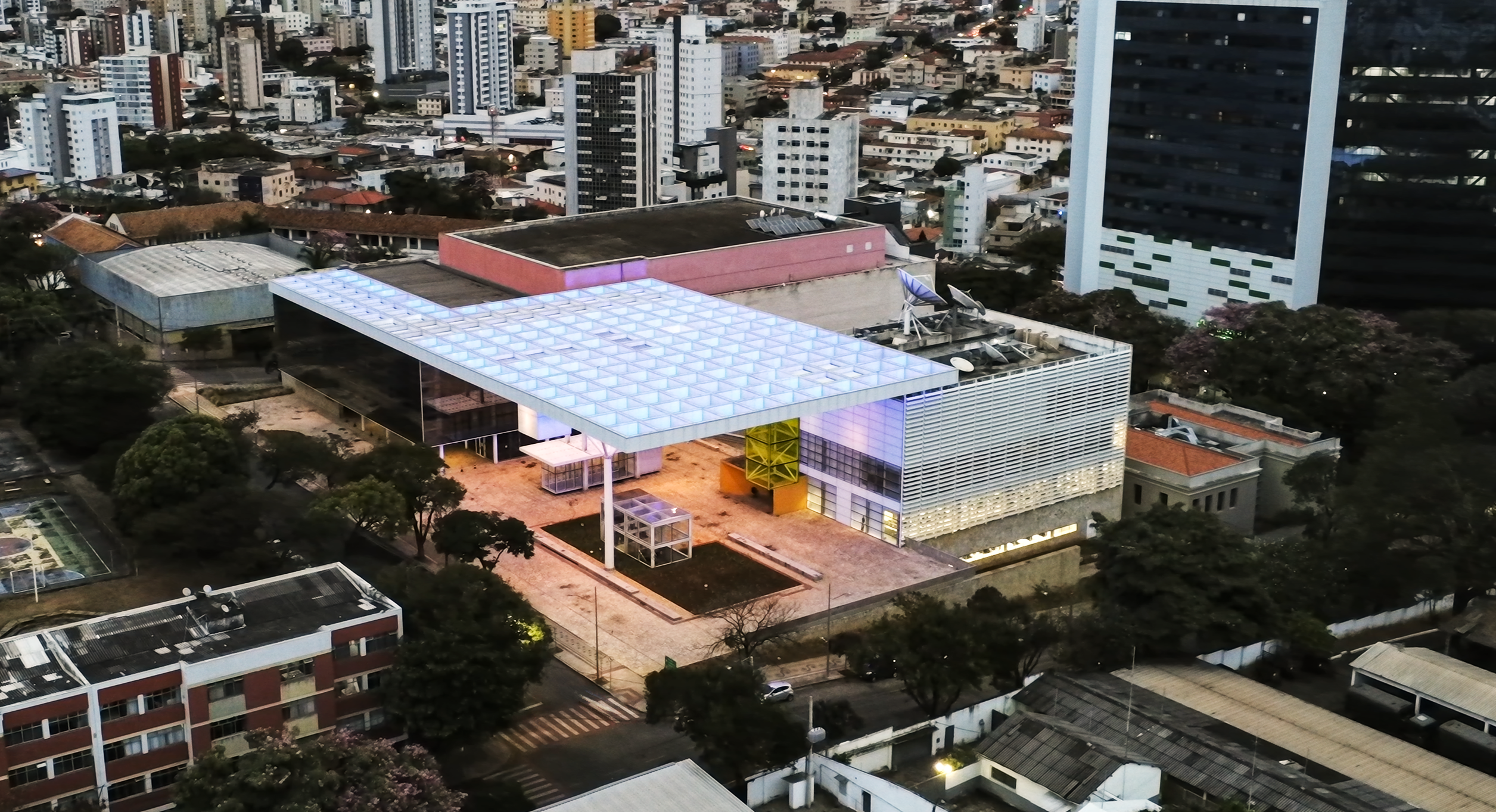
An aerial view of the Centro de Cultura Presidente Itamar Franco, the cultural complex housing the Sala Minas Gerais.

The architectural and acoustic design of Sala Minas Gerais brought together concepts from several well-known venues, such as the Berliner Philharmonie (belonging to the Berlin Philharmonic Orchestra) and the Sala São Paulo, but with no pre-established model. The Room's armchairs were purpose-designed and built, being an integral part of the hall's acoustic performance through its acoustic absorption.The audience's distribution around the stage, in front of it and on terraces around it, favors both visual and auditory aspects. Other acoustic elements in the room include ceiling diffusers, which can vary in height and angle according to the conductor's instructions, as well as the sail-shaped walls.

In addition to the main hall, where the orchestra's presentations and rehearsals take place, the building houses the orchestra's administrative area (Instituto Cultural Filarmônica), as well as rooms for instrument rehearsals and spaces for archives and exhibitions. There's an ample foyer with restrooms and coffee shops spread over three floors. Next to the hall are the other buildings that make up the cultural complex: the headquarters of state-owned radio and TV stations, Rádio Inconfidência and Rede Minas, and a heritage listed mansion housing Mineiraria, dedicated to typical Minas Gerais food. The complex is permeated by a large public square.
