= Cachoeira de Pajeú =

Municipality of Brazil

Coordinates: 15°57′59″S 41°29′52″W

- Municipality
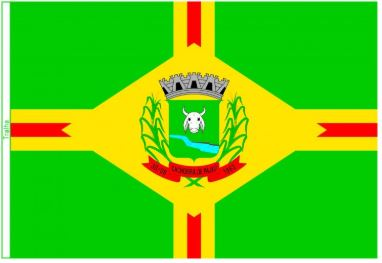
- Flag
- Interactive map of Cachoeira de Pajeú
- Country: Brazil
- State: Minas Gerais
- Region: Southeast
- Time zone: UTC−3 (BRT)

Location of Cachoeira de Pajeú in the state of Minas Gerais

Cachoeira de Pajeú is a municipality in the northeast of the Brazilian state of Minas Gerais. Its population in 2020 was 9,442 inhabitants in a total area of 674 km^{2}.

It belongs to the Pedra Azul statistical microregion. The elevation of the municipal seat is 729 meters. It became a municipality in 1989 being called André Fernandes when it was a district of Pedra Azul. This municipality is located just south of the important Br-251 and a short distance west of BR-116. The nearest population center with more services is Medina.

Neighboring municipalities are: Pedra Azul and Águas Vermelhas.

The main economic activities are cattle raising and subsistence farming. The GDP was R$48,031,000 (2005). There was 01 banking agency in 2006. In the rural area there were 599 farms with around 1,500 people involved in the agricultural sector. There was a planted area of around 8,000 hectares. The main cash crop was coffee. There were 23 tractors, a ratio of one tractor for every 30 farms. In the health sector there were 07 health clinics and 01 hospital with 30 beds. The score on the Municipal Human Development Index was 0.622. This ranked the city 800 out of 853 municipalities in the state, with Poços de Caldas in first place with 0.841 and Setubinha in last place with 0.568. See Frigoletto for the complete list.

== See also ==
- List of municipalities in Minas Gerais
