= Curral de Dentro =

Municipality in the northeast of the Brazilian state of Minas Gerais

Coordinates: 15°56′14″S 41°51′17″W

- Municipality
- Location of Curral de Dentro in the state of Minas Gerais

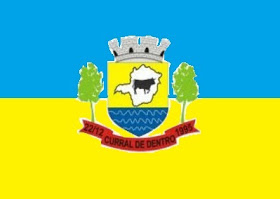
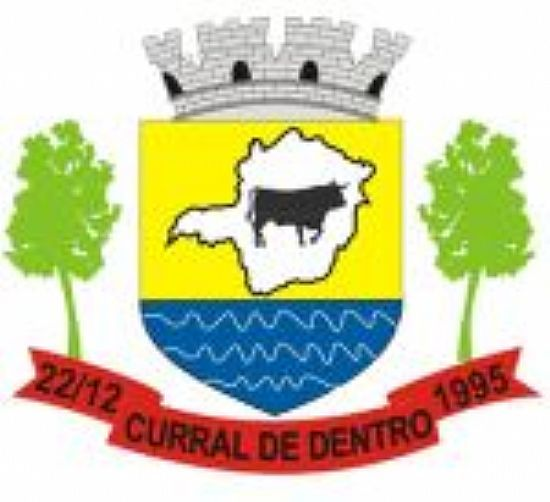
- Flag Coat of arms

- Location in Brazil
- Country: Brazil
- State: Minas Gerais
- Established: 1997

Area
  - Total: 571 km^{2} (220 sq mi)
- Elevation: 890 m (2,920 ft)

Population (2020)
  - Total: 7,799
- Time zone: UTC-3 (BRT)
  - Summer (DST): UTC-2 (BRST)
- Area code: +55 38

Curral de Dentro is a municipality in the northeast of the Brazilian state of Minas Gerais. As of 2020 the population was 7,799 in a total area of 571 km^{2}. The elevation is 890 meters. It became a municipality in 1997.

It is part of the statistical microregion of Salinas and lies 5 km. north of highway BR-251. The distance to Salinas is 56 km.

Neighboring municipalities are: Taiobeiras, Berizal, Águas Vermelhas, and Santa Cruz de Salinas.

This is one of the poorest municipalities in the state and in the country. Isolation and drought mean that most of the inhabitants live in extreme poverty. The main economic activities are cattle raising (11,000 head in 2006) and farming with modest production of coffee, oranges, beans, manioc, sugarcane, and corn. In 2006 there were 365 rural producers in a total area of 24,691 hectares. Cropland made up 1,000 hectares. There were only 25 tractors. In the urban area there were no financial institutions as of 2006. There were 149 automobiles (2007), giving a ratio of about one automobile for every 46 inhabitants. Health care was provided by 3 public health clinics. There were no hospitals.

Municipal Human Development Index

- MHDI: .597 (2000)
- State ranking: 839 out of 853 municipalities as of 2000
- National ranking: 4,715 out of 5,138 municipalities as of 2000
- Life expectancy: 59
- Literacy rate: 67
- Combined primary, secondary and tertiary gross enrollment ratio: .758
- Per capita income (monthly): R$85.29 (For the complete list see Frigoletto)

At last count, Brazil had 5,561 municipalities while Minas Gerais still had 853.

The above figures can be compared with those of Poços de Caldas, which had an MHDI of .841, the highest in the state of Minas Gerais. The highest MHDI in the country (2000) was São Caetano do Sul in the state of São Paulo with an MHDI of .919. More up-to-date data from 2004 show that the lowest in that year was Manari in the state of Pernambuco with an MHDI of .467 out of a total of 5504 municipalities in the country as of 2004. At last count Brazil had 5,561 municipalities so this might have changed at the time of this writing. See Frigoletto

== See also ==
- List of municipalities in Minas Gerais
