= Nascentes Geraizeiras Sustainable Development Reserve =

Sustainable development reserve in Minas Gerais, Brazil

- Reserva de Desenvolvimento Sustentável Nascentes Geraizeiras
- IUCN category VI (protected area with sustainable use of natural resources)
- Location within Brazil
- Location: Minas Gerais (state), Brazil
- Nearest city: Montezuma
- Coordinates: 15°25′34″S 42°25′08″W
- Area: 38,177 hectares (94,340 acres)
- Designation: Sustainable development reserve
- Created: 13 October 2014
- Administrator: Chico Mendes Institute for Biodiversity Conservation

The Nascentes Geraizeiras Sustainable Development Reserve (Portuguese: Reserva de Desenvolvimento Sustentável Nascentes Geraizeiras is a sustainable development reserve in the Cerrado ecoregion within the state of Minas Gerais, Brazil.

== Location ==
The Nascentes Geraizeiras Sustainable Development Reserve (RDS), in the north of the state of Minas Gerais. It has an area of 38,177 hectares (94,340 acres) in the Cerrado biome.

It protects parts of the municipalities of:

- Montezuma (54.72%)
- Rio Pardo de Minas (28.8%)
- Vargem Grande do Rio Pardo (16.47%) .

== History ==
The Nascentes Geraizeiras Sustainable Development Reserve (RDS) was created in response to demands from the Movimento dos Geraizeiros, which represents the traditional community of the state. This includes small-scale producers of cassava flour, brown sugar, corn and beans, and harvesters of the pequi and panã fruits and of medicinal plants of the cerrado. The RDS was created by presidential decree on 13 October 2014. The decree also established the Serra do Gandarela National Park in Minas Gerais and the Guaricana National Park in Paraná, and added over 30,000 hectares (74,000 acres) to the existing Médio Juruá Extractive Reserve in Amazonas.

The Nascentes Geraizeiras RDS is administered by the Chico Mendes Institute for Biodiversity Conservation (ICMBio). The reserve is classed as IUCN protected area category VI (protected area with sustainable use of natural resources). The purpose is to protect the water sources in the reserve, protect areas used for extraction by the traditional communities, give the traditional communities access to the reserve and promote their social and economic development, encourage studies on conservation and sustainable use of the cerrado and promote conservation of biodiversity.

== Sources ==
- Governo federal cria e amplia unidades de conservação em Minas Gerais, Paraná, Amazonas e Pará (in Portuguese), Secretaria de Governo auxilia o Presidente da República, 14 October 2014, archived from the original on 2019-07-19
- RDS Nascentes Geraizeiras (in Portuguese), Chico Mendes Institute for Biodiversity Conservation
- RDS Nascentes Geraizeiras (in Portuguese), ISA: Instituto Socioambiental
- Unidade de Conservação: Reserva de Desenvolvimento Sustentável Nascentes Geraizeiras (in Portuguese), MMA: Ministério do Meio Ambiente
