= Águas Vermelhas =

City in Minas Gerais, Brazil

- Municipality
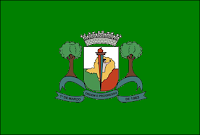
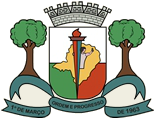
- Flag Coat of arms
- Etymology: In English "Red waters", referring to the rusty color of the waters of the stream running through the municipality
- Location in the state of Minas Gerais

- Location within Brazil Location within South America
- Coordinates: 15°45′S 41°28′W
- Country: Brazil
- Region: Southeast
- State: Minas Gerais
- Founded: 30 December 1962

Government
  - Mayor: Nilson Francisco Campos (Avante) (2025-2028)
  - Vice Mayor: Uilton Pereira Figueiredo (PDT) (2025-2028)

Area
  - Total: 1,256.61 km^{2} (485.18 sq mi)
- Elevation: 779 m (2,556 ft)

Population (2022)
  - Total: 14,037
  - Density: 11.17/km^{2} (28.9/sq mi)
- Demonym: Águas-vermelhense (Brazilian Portuguese)
- Time zone: UTC-03:00 (Brasília Time)
- Postal code: 39990-000, 39993-000
- HDI (2010): 0.601 – medium
- Website: aguasvermelhas.mg.gov.br

Águas Vermelhas is a city in the northeast of the Brazilian state of Minas Gerais. In 2020 its population was estimated to be 13,599 in a total area of 1,258 km^{2} (486 sq mi).

The city belongs to the mesoregion of Jequitinhonha and to the microregion of Salinas. The elevation of the municipal seat is 758 meters. It became a municipality in 1962. This municipality is located on the Rio Mosquito and is 13 km. west of the important BR-116 highway. It forms a boundary with the state of Minas Gerais.

Municipal boundaries are with: Ninheira, Divisa Alegre, Curral de Dentro, Berizal, São João do Paraíso, and Medina.

The main economic activities are cattle raising and farming. The GDP was R$50,544,000 (2005). There was 1 banking agency in 2006. In the rural area there were 596 farms with around 2,000 people involved in the agricultural sector. There were 63 tractors, a ratio of one tractor for every 10 farms. The main crops were coffee, bananas, sugarcane, beans, manioc, and corn. In the health sector there were 4 health clinics and 01 hospital with 46 beds. The score on the Municipal Human Development Index was 0.628. This ranked Divisa Alegre 792 out of 853 municipalities in the state, with Poços de Caldas in first place with 0.841 and Setubinha in last place with 0.568. See Frigoletto for the complete list.

== See also ==
- List of municipalities in Minas Gerais
