= Salinas Airport (Brazil) =

Salinas Airport Aeroporto de Salinas
- IATA: IAL; ICAO: SNSS; LID: MG0029

Summary
- Airport type: Public
- Serves: Salinas
- Time zone: BRT (UTC−03:00)
- Elevation AMSL: 763 m (2,503 ft)
- Coordinates: 16°12′30″S 042°19′19″W

Map
- Location in Brazil IAL (Brazil)

Runways
Direction	Length		Surface
Direction	m	ft	Surface
18/36	1,480	4,856	Asphalt
- Sources: ANAC, DECEA

Salinas Airport (IATA: IAL, ICAO: SNSS), is the airport serving Salinas, Brazil.

== Access ==
The airport is located 11 km (7 mi) from downtown Salinas.

== See also ==
- List of airports in Brazil
