= Coronel Murta =

Human settlement in Brazil

Coordinates: 16°37′S 42°11′W

- Municipality
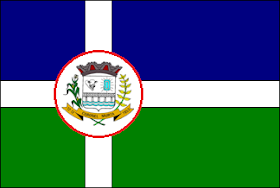
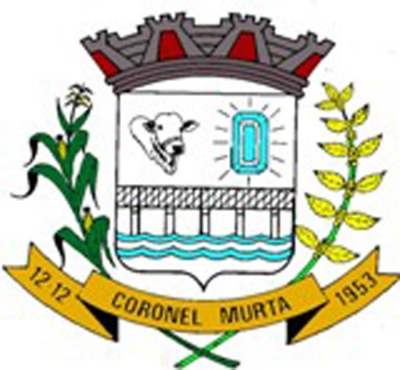
- Flag Coat of arms
- Interactive map of Coronel Murta
- Country: Brazil
- State: Minas Gerais
- Region: Southeast
- Time zone: UTC−3 (BRT)

Location of Coronel Murta in the state of Minas Gerais

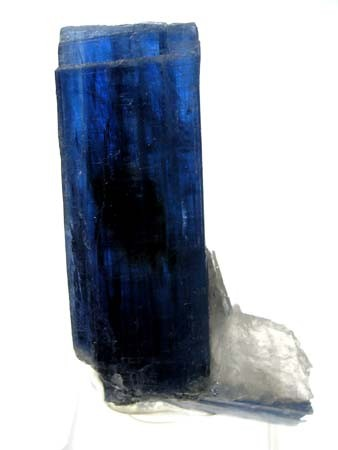
Intense blue Kyanite from Barra de Salinas mining district, Coronel Murta.

Coronel Murta is a Brazilian municipality located in the northeast of the state of Minas Gerais. Its population as of 2020 was estimated to be 9,215 people living in a total area of 813 km^{2} (314 sq mi). The city belongs to the mesoregion of Jequitinhonha and to the microregion of Araçuaí. It became a municipality in 1953.

== Geography ==
Coronel Murta is located on the left bank of the Jequitinhonha River at an elevation of 322 meters. The climate is semi-arid. The region is one of the most impoverished in the country.

== Economy ==
The economy is based on cattle raising, services, and subsistence agriculture, with the main crops being beans, sugarcane, and corn. The cattle herd had 11,000 head in 2006. In 2005 there were 770 rural producers but only 14 tractors. 2,500 persons were dependent on agriculture. As of 2005 there were 5 public health clinics. Educational needs were met by 10 primary schools, 1 middle school and 1 nursery school. There were 191 automobiles in 2006, giving a ratio of 47 inhabitants per automobile (there were 403 motorcycles). There was 1 bank in 2007.

Neighboring municipalities are: Rubelita - Araçuaí - Virgem da Lapa. The distance to Belo Horizonte is 714 km. The distance to the nearest major population center, Araçuaí is 30 km.

== Social indicators ==
Coronel Murta is ranked low on the MHDI and was one of the poorest municipalities in the state and in the country in 2000.

- MHDI: .673 (2000)
- State ranking: 663 out of 853 municipalities
- National ranking: 3,413 out of 5,138 municipalities in 2000
- Life expectancy: 67
- Literacy rate: 76
- Combined primary, secondary and tertiary gross enrolment ratio: .800
- Per capita income (monthly): R$95.00

The above figures can be compared with those of Poços de Caldas, which had an MHDI of .841, the highest in the state of Minas Gerais. The highest in the country was São Caetano do Sul in the state of São Paulo with an MHDI of .919. The lowest was Manari in the state of Pernambuco with an MHDI of .467 out of a total of 5504 municipalities in the country as of 2004. At last count Brazil had 5,561 municipalities so this might have changed at the time of this writing.

== See also ==
- List of municipalities in Minas Gerais
