= Indaiabira =

Municipality in the northeast of the Brazilian state of Minas Gerais

Coordinates: 15°28′49″S 42°11′14″W

- Municipality
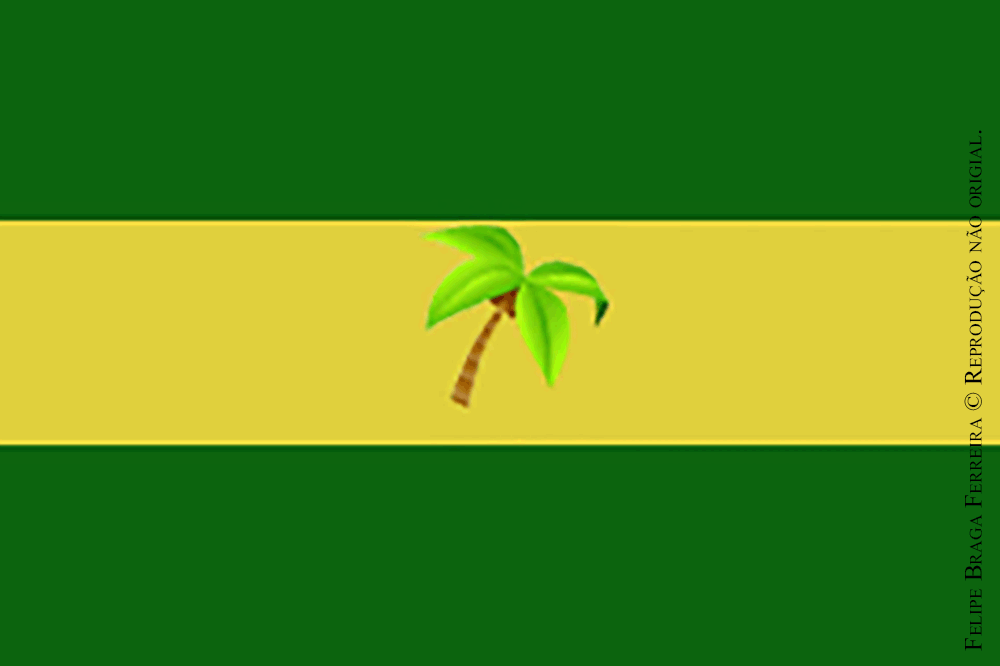
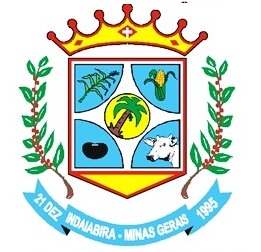
- Flag Coat of arms
- Interactive map of Indaiabira
- Country: Brazil
- State: Minas Gerais
- Region: Southeast
- Time zone: UTC−3 (BRT)

Location of Indaiabira in the state of Minas Gerais

Indaiabira is a municipality in the northeast of the Brazilian state of Minas Gerais. As of 2020 the population was 7,339 in a total area of 1,008 km^{2} (389 sq mi). The elevation is 857 meters. It became a municipality in 1997.

Indaiabira is part of the statistical microregion of Salinas. It is surrounded by the following municipalities: Rio Pardo de Minas, Vargem Grande do Rio Pardo, São João do Paraíso, and Taiobeiras. It is connected by poor roads to the regional center of Salinas to the south.

This is one of the poorest municipalities in the state and in the country. The main economic activities are cattle raising and farming with modest production of sugarcane, bananas, coffee, and rice. In 2006 there were 1,222 rural producers with a total area of 37,230 hectares. Cropland made up 4,000 hectares. There were only 45 tractors. In the urban area there were no financial institutions as of 2006. There were 101 automobiles, giving a ratio of about one automobile for every 70 inhabitants. Health care was provided by 6 public health clinics. There were no hospitals.

== Municipal Human Development Index ==
- MHDI: .571 (2000)
- State ranking: 851 out of 853 municipalities as of 2000
- National ranking: 5,094 out of 5,138 municipalities as of 2000
- Life expectancy: 60
- Literacy rate: 60
- Combined primary, secondary and tertiary gross enrolment ratio: .700
- Per capita income (monthly): R$74.02 (For the complete list see Frigoletto)

At last count Brazil had 5,561 municipalities while Minas Gerais still had 853. The above figures can be compared with those of Poços de Caldas, which had an MHDI of .841, the highest in the state of Minas Gerais. The highest in the country was São Caetano do Sul in the state of São Paulo with an MHDI of .919. The lowest was Manari in the state of Pernambuco with an MHDI of .467 out of a total of 5504 municipalities in the country as of 2004. At last count Brazil had 5,561 municipalities. See Frigoletto

== See also ==
- List of municipalities in Minas Gerais
