= Ninheira =

City in the northeast of the Brazilian state of Minas Gerais

Coordinates: 15°18′20″S 41°43′24″W

- City
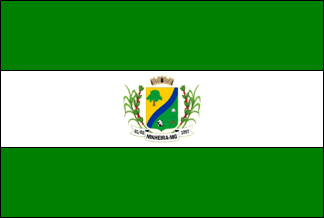
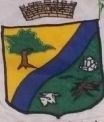
- Flag Coat of arms

- Location in Brazil
- Country: Brazil
- State: Minas Gerais
- Region: Southeast
- Mesoregion: Jequitinhonha
- Microregion: Salinas

Area
  - Total: 1,114 km^{2} (430 sq mi)
- Elevation: 855 m (2,805 ft)

Population (2020)
  - Total: 10,326
  - Density: 9.269/km^{2} (24.01/sq mi)
- Time zone: UTC-3 (BRT)

Location of Ninheira in the state of Minas Gerais

Ninheira is a city in the northeast of the Brazilian state of Minas Gerais. In 2020 its population was estimated to be 10,326 in a total area of 1,114 km^{2} (430 sq mi).

The city belongs to the mesoregion of Jequitinhonha and to the microregion of Salinas. The elevation of the municipal seat is 855 meters. It became a municipality in 1997. This municipality is located on the Rio Pardo and forms a boundary with the state of Bahia.

Municipal boundaries are with: Águas Vermelhas, São João do Paraíso, and the state of Bahia.

The main economic activities are cattle raising and farming. The GDP was R$21,415,000 (2005). There were no banking agencies in 2006. There were 107 automobiles in 2007, a ratio of one for every 100 people. In the rural area there were 762 farms with around 2,300 people involved in the agricultural sector. There were 27 tractors, a ratio of one tractor for every 30 farms. The main crops were coffee, bananas, sugarcane, beans, manioc, and corn. In the health sector there were 4 health clinics and no hospitals. The score on the Municipal Human Development Index was 0.604. This ranked Ninheira 827 out of 853 municipalities in the state, with Poços de Caldas in first place with 0.841 and Setubinha in last place with 0.568. See Frigoletto for the complete list.

== See also ==
- List of municipalities in Minas Gerais
