= Berizal =

Municipality in Minas Gerais, Brazil

Coordinates: 15°36′46″S 41°44′42″W

- Municipality
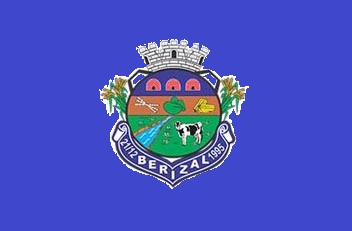
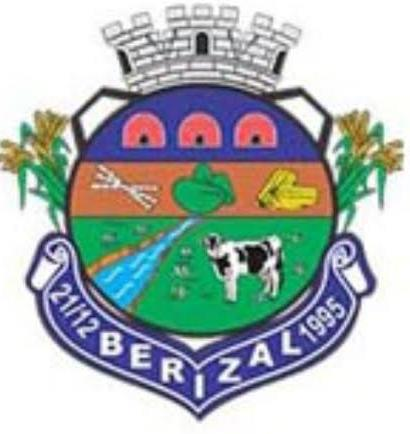
- Flag Coat of arms

- Country: Brazil
- State: Minas Gerais

Berizal is a municipality in the state of Minas Gerais, Brazil. As of 2020 the population was 4,764 in a total area of 493 km^{2} (190 sq mi).

The city belongs to the mesoregion of Jequitinhonha and to the microregion of Salinas. The elevation of the municipal seat is 692 meters. It became a municipality in 1997. This municipality is located in an isolated area of the state on the Rio Pardo, which flows into the Atlantic at Canavieiras, in the state of Bahia.

Municipal boundaries are with: Aguas Vermelhas, São João do Paraíso, Taiobeiras, and Curral de Dentro.

The main economic activities are cattle raising and farming. The GDP was R$10,043,000 (2005). There were no banking agencies in 2006. In the rural area there were 283 farms with around 900 people involved in the agricultural sector. There were 23 tractors, a ratio of one tractor for every 14 farms. The main crops were coffee, bananas, sugarcane, beans, manioc, and corn. In the health sector there were 3 health clinics. The score on the Municipal Human Development Index was 0.601. This ranked Divisa Alegre 834 out of 853 municipalities in the state, with Poços de Caldas in first place with 0.841 and Setubinha in last place with 0.568. See Frigoletto for the complete list.

== See also ==
- List of municipalities in Minas Gerais
