= Pedra Azul =

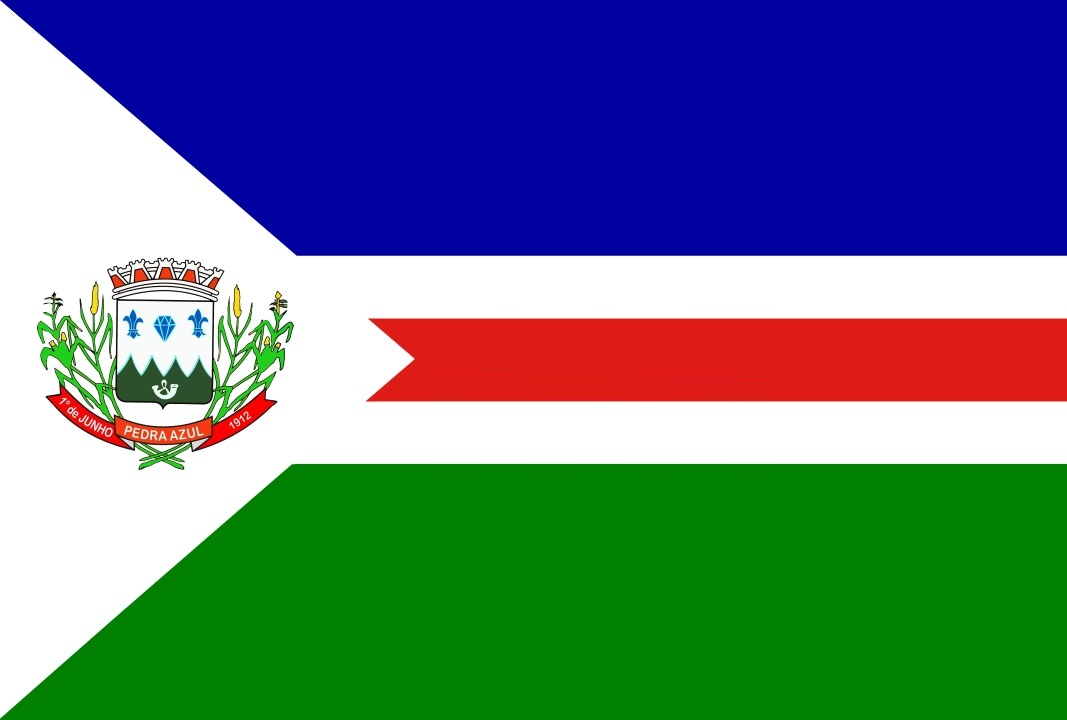
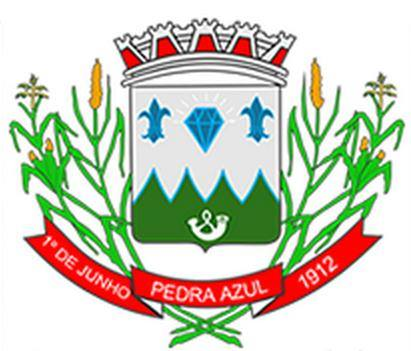
- Flag Coat of arms

- Location in Brazil

- Location within Brazil
- Coordinates: 16°00′18″S 41°17′49″W
- Country: Brazil
- Region: Southeast
- State: Minas Gerais
- Founded: June 1, 1912

Government
  - Mayor: Ricardo Mendes Pinto

Area
  - Total: 1,618.686 km^{2} (624.978 sq mi)

Population (2020)
  - Total: 24,329
  - Density: 15.3/km^{2} (40/sq mi)
- Time zone: UTC−3 (BRT)
- HDI (2000): 0.660 – medium

Pedra Azul (Portuguese for "blue stone") is a Brazilian municipality in the state of Minas Gerais, located in the northeast of the state, in the Jequitinhonha River valley region. The population in 2020 was 24,329 in a total area of 1,619 km^{2}.

The city belongs to the mesoregion of Jequitinhonha and to the microregion of Pedra Azul. The elevation of the municipal seat is 617 meters. It became a municipality in 1911. This municipality is located 16 km. to the east of the important BR-116 highway, which links Rio de Janeiro to Salvador. The boundary with the state of Bahia is 49 km. to the northeast.

Pedra Azul is also a statistical microregion that includes the following municipalities: Cachoeira de Pajeú, Comercinho, Itaobim, Medina, and Pedra Azul.

The main economic activities are cattle raising and farming. The GDP was R$111,200,000 (2005). There were 2 banking agencies in 2006. In the rural area there were 570 farms with around 1,700 people involved in the agricultural sector. There were 58 tractors, a ratio of one tractor for every 10 farms. The main crops were bananas, coffee, passion fruit, beans, manioc, and corn. In the health sector there were 10 health clinics and 1 hospital with 66 beds. The score on the Municipal Human Development Index was 0.660. This ranked Pedra Azul 709 out of 853 municipalities in the state, with Poços de Caldas in first place with 0.841 and Setubinha in last place with 0.568. See Frigoletto for the complete list.

== Climate ==
Climate data for Pedra Azul (1981–2010)
Month	Jan	Feb	Mar	Apr	May	Jun	Jul	Aug	Sep	Oct	Nov	Dec	Year
Mean daily maximum °C (°F)	30.2 (86.4)	31.1 (88.0)	30.3 (86.5)	28.8 (83.8)	27.4 (81.3)	26.0 (78.8)	25.5 (77.9)	26.3 (79.3)	28.1 (82.6)	29.6 (85.3)	29.3 (84.7)	29.8 (85.6)	28.5 (83.3)
Daily mean °C (°F)	24.3 (75.7)	24.7 (76.5)	24.2 (75.6)	23.2 (73.8)	21.5 (70.7)	20.0 (68.0)	19.4 (66.9)	20.0 (68.0)	21.8 (71.2)	23.3 (73.9)	23.5 (74.3)	23.9 (75.0)	22.5 (72.5)
Mean daily minimum °C (°F)	19.8 (67.6)	19.9 (67.8)	19.8 (67.6)	18.9 (66.0)	16.9 (62.4)	15.2 (59.4)	14.6 (58.3)	15.0 (59.0)	16.8 (62.2)	18.1 (64.6)	19.0 (66.2)	19.5 (67.1)	17.8 (64.0)
Average precipitation mm (inches)	113.9 (4.48)	64.2 (2.53)	131.1 (5.16)	61.4 (2.42)	29.7 (1.17)	11.3 (0.44)	11.9 (0.47)	8.4 (0.33)	18.0 (0.71)	52.3 (2.06)	164.3 (6.47)	187.2 (7.37)	853.7 (33.61)
Average precipitation days (≥ 1.0 mm)	7	5	10	5	4	3	4	3	3	5	10	11	70
Average relative humidity (%)	72.2	70.3	74.2	75.4	76.8	76.7	74.9	70.7	67.3	66.9	72.7	74.4	72.7
Mean monthly sunshine hours	224.3	218.7	215.8	194.7	191.7	174.3	185.1	204.8	199.3	207.1	159.7	179.3	2,354.8
Source: Instituto Nacional de Meteorologia

== See also ==
- List of municipalities in Minas Gerais
