= Rede Minas =

Rede Minas (ZYA 729)

Belo Horizonte, Minas Gerais; Brazil
- Channels: Digital: 17 (UHF); Virtual: 9

Programming
- Affiliations: TV Brasil, TV Cultura

Ownership
- Owner: Empresa Mineira de Comunicação
- Sister stations: Rádio Inconfidência

History
- First air date: December 8, 1984
- Former channel numbers: Analog: 9 (VHF, 1984-2017)

Technical information
- Licensing authority: ANATEL
- Transmitter coordinates: 19°55′39″S 43°57′22.68″W

Links
- Website: redeminas.tv

Rede Minas is a Brazilian over-the-air public television network based in Belo Horizonte, capital of the state of Minas Gerais. It belongs to Empresa Mineira de Comunicação, a state government body, which also maintains Rádio Inconfidência. It was created in 1984 by a decree signed by then governor Tancredo Neves, who established the Fundação TV Minas Cultural e Educativa, then linked to the State Secretariat for Culture. The third largest public network in the country, in addition to airing its own programming, it relays TV Brasil and TV Cultura, also public, and has affiliates throughout Minas Gerais and other states in Brazil.

== History ==
On August 14, 1984, decree No. 23,807 of Minas Gerais legislation, signed by the then state governor Tancredo Neves, established the Fundação TV Minas - Cultural e Educativa, linked to the then State Secretariat for Culture, "with the purpose of promoting educational and cultural activities through television". Opened on December 8 of the same year through VHF channel 9 in Belo Horizonte, TV Minas programming aired from 6pm to midnight, retransmitting TV Educativa from Rio de Janeiro. At the time, its president was Dalton Canabrava Filho. Its headquarters were located in a house in the Floresta neighborhood, in the eastern region of Belo Horizonte. Initially transmitting to 33 cities around the center of the state, its coverage area was expanded with microwave links that connected the capital to the south of Minas.

In 1985, the first local productions were shown. In 1987, its schedule was expanded from six to seventeen hours a day. In 1990, it began rebroadcasting the programming of TV Cultura in São Paulo. In 1995, it moved to a building in the Sion neighborhood and adopted the name Rede Minas. The inauguration of the new headquarters was attended by the then President of the Republic Fernando Henrique Cardoso. In 1996, the station began broadcasting 24 hours of programming a day. In 2007, with the creation of TV Brasil, Rede Minas began showing the new network in combination with TV Cultura to this day.

In April 1998, it inaugurated its satellite transmission system, with 336 retransmitters broadcasting its programming. This was the initial milestone in the internalization of the broadcaster’s programming in the State. From 2004 onwards, the coverage of the signal grew, reaching, in 2010, around 80% of Minas Gerais municipalities with retransmitters. Some of them are from stations, under the responsibility of the State Department of Telecommunications (DETEL), which installs and maintains the equipment. The network maintains 44 affiliated stations in the interior of Minas Gerais, corroborating this coverage.

In December 2005, Rede Minas signed a partnership agreement with ADTV - Minas Gerais Radio Development Association, an OSCIP, adopting a new administrative-managerial model, to enable the performance of TV activities that are not exclusive to the State. To monitor OSCIP's activities, through objective and transparent criteria, for evaluating results, suitable for social control, the participation of collegiate bodies representing civil society is vital, which are represented by the General Assembly, the Administration and Fiscal Councils, which meet regularly. In this way, it became possible to provide greater agility and transparency to actions, as well as flexibility in the allocation of resources.

ADTV produces content for the programming schedule and captures part of the resources to be invested in production, together with the amount transferred by the Government of the State of Minas Gerais. Fundação TV Minas Cultural e Educativa, through its board, is responsible for the guidelines in relation to the content to be produced in its various segments.

In 2013, as determined by the Public Ministry of Labor and the Public Ministry of the State of Minas Gerais, a public competition was announced for the restoration of positions at the broadcaster. During this period, the transition from the partnership model with ADTV to the foundation model with public servants was initiated.

Still in 2013, the construction of its new headquarters, Estação da Cultura Presidente Itamar Franco, in Barro Preto, central region of Belo Horizonte, was announced. The new headquarters of Rede Minas has 14,400 m² and houses, in addition to the TV, the facilities of Rádio Inconfidência and the Minas Gerais Philharmonic Orchestra. In an eight-story structure, the complex is divided into two sectors: one made up of concert halls and the other for TV and Radio. Estação da Cultura has modern studios, both for Rede Minas and Rádio Inconfidência, with cutting-edge technology and suitable for recordings, which will enable an increase in the number of productions and quality. The Culture Center also has food services, a public square and parking for 250 spaces.

In 2015, TV Cultura formed a partnership with the Minas Gerais broadcaster to broadcast programs and journalistic content. But the partnership lasted a short time and Jornal da Cultura stopped broadcasting days later due to a change in management without prior notice. Instead, Rede Minas began broadcasting Repórter Brasil.

In September 2016, the law creating the Empresa Mineira de Comunicação was sanctioned, a project that integrates Rádio Inconfidência with Rede Minas. The stations began operating in 2017 from their new headquarters, the Centro de Cultura Presidente Itamar Franco, which had its construction completed the previous year.

In December 2016, the broadcaster became a pioneer among Brazilian public TV networks by launching the interactivity project on OTA digital TV. The project, developed by the Núcleo Transmídia of Rede Minas in partnership with the State Secretariat of Culture of Minas Gerais, allows viewers to interact with the programming, through remote control of the television set. To take the interactive resources to air, Ginga was used, present on TV sets that support the new standard of the Brazilian Digital TV System.

== Technical information ==
Virtual channel	Digital channel	Screen	Content
9.1	17 UHF	1080i	Rede Minas' programming
