= Santa Cruz de Salinas =

Municipality in the northeast of the Brazilian state of Minas Gerais

Coordinates: 16°05′54″S 41°44′10″W

- Municipality
- Interactive map of Santa Cruz de Salinas
- Country: Brazil
- State: Minas Gerais
- Region: Southeast
- Time zone: UTC−3 (BRT)

Location of Santa Cruz de Salinas in the state of Minas Gerais

Santa Cruz de Salinas is a municipality in the northeast of the Brazilian state of Minas Gerais. Its population in 2020 was 4,107 inhabitants in a total area of 587 km^{2} (227 sq mi).

Santa Cruz de Salinas belongs to the Salinas statistical microregion. The elevation of the municipal seat is 728 meters. It became a municipality in 1997.

The main economic activities are cattle raising and farming. The GDP was R$11,710,000 (2005). There were no banking agencies in 2006. In all the municipality there were 63 automobiles in 2007, a ratio of one automobile for every 80 inhabitants. In the rural area there were 808 farms with around 2,500 people involved in the agricultural sector. There were 2 tractors, a ratio of one tractor for every 400 farms. The main crops were coffee, citrus fruits, sugarcane, beans, manioc, and corn. In the health sector there were 4 health clinics and no hospitals. The score on the Municipal Human Development Index was 0.599 (2000). This ranked Rubelita 836 out of 853 municipalities in the state, with Poços de Caldas in first place with 0.841 and Setubinha in last place with 0.568.

== See also ==
- List of municipalities in Minas Gerais
