= Rádio Inconfidência =

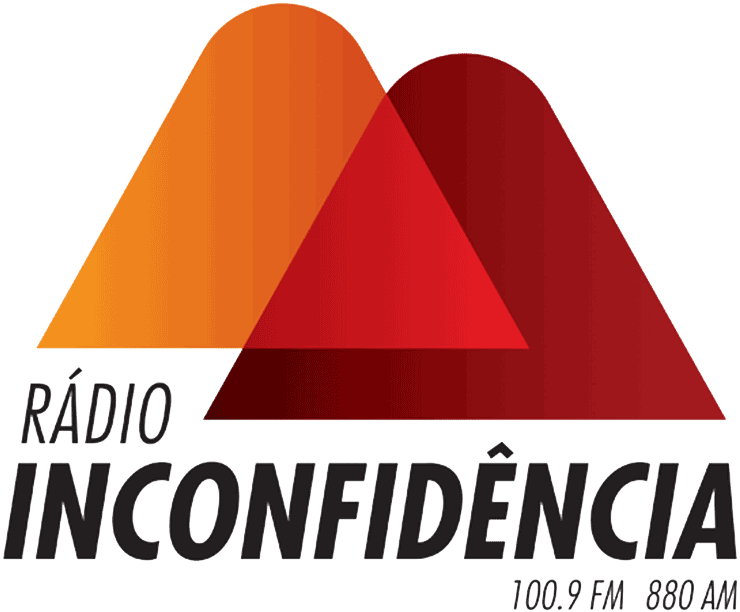
- Belo Horizonte; Brazil
- Broadcast area: Central Minas Gerais
- Frequencies: 880 kHz; 100.9 MHz; 6010 kHz; 15190 kHz

Programming
- Format: News, Talk, Variety

Ownership
- Owner: Minas Gerais Communication Company

History
- First air date: September 3, 1936

Technical information
- Licensing authority: ANATEL
- Class: A (AM), E3 (FM)
- Power: 100 watts (AM)
- ERP: 60 kW (FM)
- Transmitter coordinates: 19°53′59″S 44°03′16″W (AM); 19°58′15.2″S 43°55′47.2″W (FM)

Links
- Website: radioinconfidencia.com.br

Rádio Inconfidência, commonly Inconfidência is a public radio station broadcasting on 880 kHz and 100.9 MHz serving Belo Horizonte, Minas Gerais and the central portion of the state in Brazil and in shortwave frequencies of 6010 kHz and 15190 kHz. The station includes talk radio mainly during the mornings, Brazilian and foreign music, news and sports. The two stations broadcast separately and sometimes simulcast on two stations. Its owned by Minas Gerais Communication Company (Empresa Mineira de Comunicação), the public broadcaster of the state of Minas Gerais.

== Lineup ==
=== AM radio ===
Its current lineup includes music and a segment in the afternoon hours, news in the evening hours and love songs during the evening and late night hours. Current lineup includes classical music every Mondays at 9 PM (21:00) and other music every other day. On the weekends, soccer is broadcast from 4 until 8 PM and includes state, national, Copa Libertadores and Copa América especially and entirely with its own teams including Atlético and Cruzeiro, following it, sports news which also sometimes broadcasts sporadically in mid-evening. From that time until 10 pm broadcasts a variety of classical tango music from the 1920s to the 1960s from Brazil, the rest of Latin America and parts of Europe. Every night at midnight features Memória Nacional (National Memory) dedicated to old historic Brazilian songs from midnight until 3 am.

Its former lineup included the popular Brasileiríssima broadcast during late night hours from midnight until 3 AM or 4 AM. Slogan included Sempre Brasileiríssima.

Weekend broadcasts includes Rock Brasileiro (Brazilian Rock) from 10 to 11 PM and other variety music, added in mid-2009.

== Slogan and logo ==
Its logo has a transmitting signal with the first letter of the station name (other than Rádio).

Its current and former slogans include:

- A Voz de Minas para toda a América ("Minas' Voice for Entire America")

== History ==
The station first broadcast on September 3, 1936 and became one of the state's first radio station. The station's broadcast tango and saudade music and also broadcast national soccer games, Copa América, Copa de Liberatores and the first World Cup broadcast. The station was broadcasting on PRI-3, it was broadcasting on PRK-1 and PRK-2 in the 1940s. The station was a hit in the 1950s. The station added an FM station 100.9 in 1979 and in the 1980s, the first Brasileissima broadcast. The station celebrated its 50th anniversary in 1986 and its 70th in 2006.

Embalos do Sábado was aired every Saturday night from 10 am until midnight until mid-2009 on AM following a variety of music, Brasileissima. The program included music from the 1960s to the early 1990s. News was broadcast for a full hour at 7 PM until 2007 or 2008. News are now broadcast as updates, it is now sporadically broadcast at different times on AM.

== Cast ==
- Cristiano Batista
- Déborah Rajão
- Tina Gonçalves
- Everton Gontijo
- Ricardo Parreiras
- Reny Parzewsky
- Paulo Azeredo
- José Augusto Toscano
