= Salinas, Minas Gerais =

Municipality in Minas Gerais, Brazil

Salinas
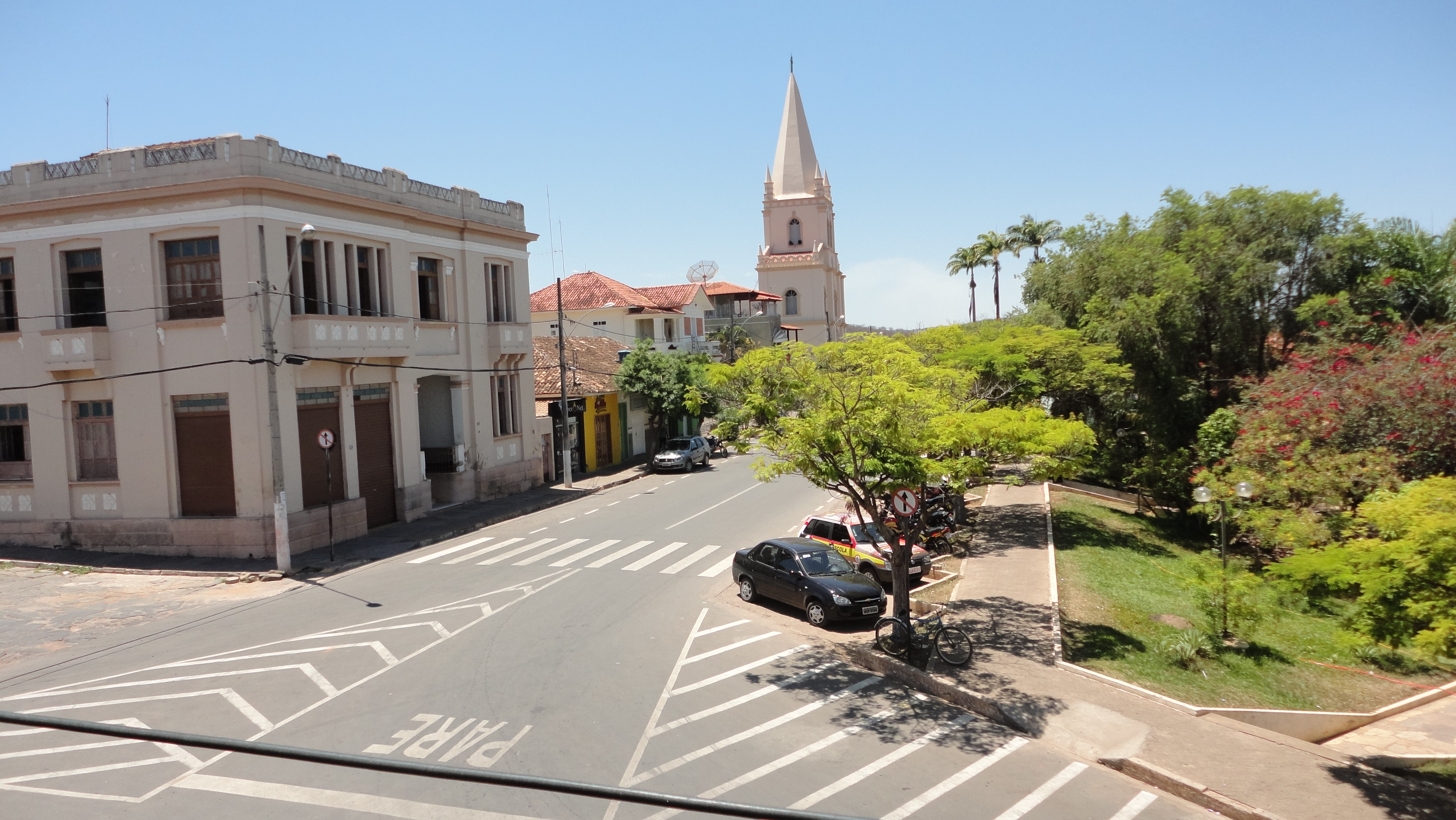
- View of Santo Antônio Church

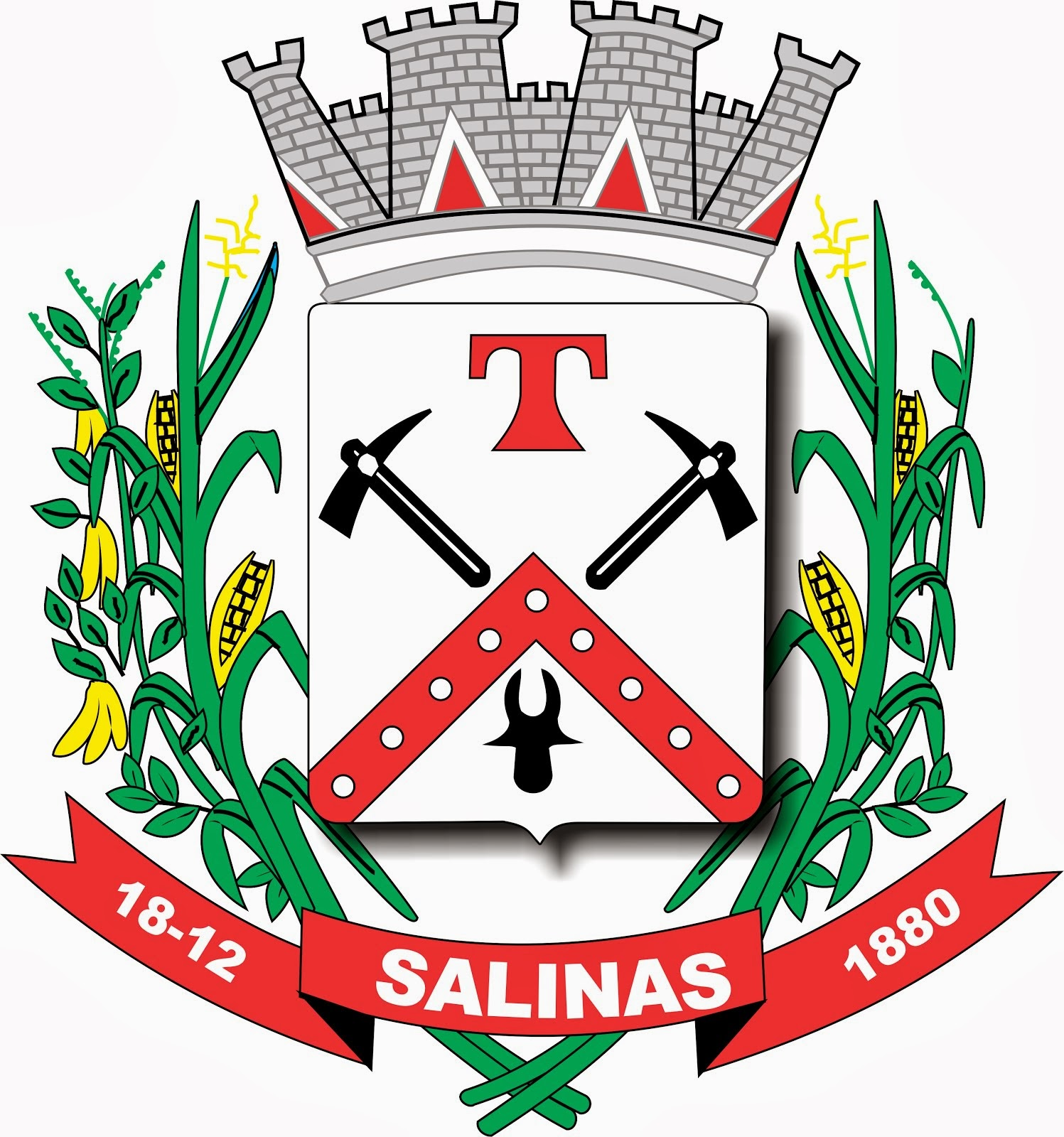
- Flag Coat of arms

- Location in the state of Minas Gerais

- Location in Brazil
- Coordinates: 15°24′57″S 43°09′27″W
- Country: Brazil
- State: Minas Gerais
- Mesoregion: North of Minas
- Microregion: Salinas
- Incorporated (municipality): 18 December 1880

Government
  - Mayor: José Antônio Prates

Area
  - Total: 1,897.169 km^{2} (732.501 sq mi)

Population (2020)
  - Total: 41,699
  - Density: 21.980/km^{2} (56.927/sq mi)
- Demonym: salinense
- Time zone: UTC−3 (BRT)
- CEP postal code: 39600-000
- Area code: 38
- Website: salinas.mg.gov.br

Salinas is a municipality in the northeast of the Brazilian state of Minas Gerais. The city is known nationally for the cachaça production.

== Important facts ==
The elevation is 471 meters. It became a municipality in 1880. The postal code (CEP) is 39560–000. Population density was around 18 inhabitants/km^{2}.

Neighboring municipalities

- Neighboring municipalities are: Taiobeiras, Rubelita, Santa Cruz de Salinas, Novorizonte, Fruta de Leite, Rio Pardo de Minas and Comercinho.

== Climate ==
Salinas has a semi-arid climate with high temperatures almost all year round. There is a period of severe drought and another with torrential and sporadic rains. The average summer temperature high is 33 °C and the average winter high is 18 °C. The maximum temperature of 41.8 °C (107.2 °F) was recorded on November 18 and 24, 2023 in Salinas.

Climate data for Salinas (1991–2020 normals, extremes 1961–present)
Month	Jan	Feb	Mar	Apr	May	Jun	Jul	Aug	Sep	Oct	Nov	Dec	Year
Record high °C (°F)	38.9 (102.0)	40.7 (105.3)	39.0 (102.2)	38.3 (100.9)	37.5 (99.5)	36.3 (97.3)	35.9 (96.6)	38.1 (100.6)	40.9 (105.6)	41.3 (106.3)	41.8 (107.2)	39.4 (102.9)	41.8 (107.2)
Mean daily maximum °C (°F)	31.8 (89.2)	32.5 (90.5)	31.9 (89.4)	31.0 (87.8)	29.6 (85.3)	28.5 (83.3)	28.4 (83.1)	29.8 (85.6)	31.9 (89.4)	32.9 (91.2)	31.0 (87.8)	31.2 (88.2)	30.9 (87.6)
Daily mean °C (°F)	25.3 (77.5)	25.5 (77.9)	25.3 (77.5)	24.4 (75.9)	22.5 (72.5)	21.2 (70.2)	21.0 (69.8)	22.3 (72.1)	24.6 (76.3)	26.1 (79.0)	25.1 (77.2)	25.1 (77.2)	24.0 (75.2)
Mean daily minimum °C (°F)	20.3 (68.5)	20.3 (68.5)	20.5 (68.9)	19.6 (67.3)	17.2 (63.0)	15.2 (59.4)	14.7 (58.5)	15.4 (59.7)	17.9 (64.2)	20.2 (68.4)	20.6 (69.1)	20.5 (68.9)	18.5 (65.3)
Record low °C (°F)	11.9 (53.4)	13.2 (55.8)	12.0 (53.6)	11.4 (52.5)	6.4 (43.5)	3.7 (38.7)	4.9 (40.8)	4.0 (39.2)	8.6 (47.5)	10.0 (50.0)	10.3 (50.5)	10.2 (50.4)	3.7 (38.7)
Average precipitation mm (inches)	112.2 (4.42)	92.6 (3.65)	120.9 (4.76)	43.2 (1.70)	16.3 (0.64)	3.9 (0.15)	4.7 (0.19)	2.7 (0.11)	12.2 (0.48)	62.1 (2.44)	176.8 (6.96)	175.8 (6.92)	823.4 (32.42)
Average precipitation days (≥ 1.0 mm)	8.4	6.3	8.5	4.3	2.2	1.1	1.1	0.6	1.3	4.9	10.8	12.3	61.8
Average relative humidity (%)	74.6	71.8	74.4	73.7	72.7	69.5	65.4	59.3	56.5	59.6	72.9	76.7	68.9
Average dew point °C (°F)	21.1 (70.0)	20.8 (69.4)	21.1 (70.0)	20.3 (68.5)	18.4 (65.1)	16.6 (61.9)	15.6 (60.1)	15.4 (59.7)	16.6 (61.9)	18.3 (64.9)	20.3 (68.5)	21.2 (70.2)	18.8 (65.8)
Mean monthly sunshine hours	207.9	208.6	204.9	190.8	179.7	168.4	194.7	215.8	207.9	208.4	158.8	183.1	2,329
Source 1: NOAA
Source 2: Instituto Nacional de Meteorologia

== Economy ==
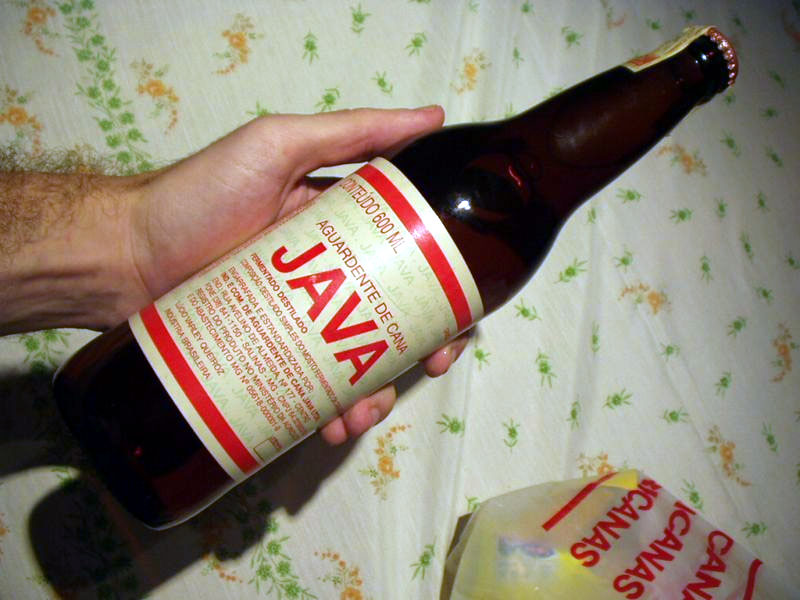
A bottle of Cachaça, produced in Salinas

The main economic activities are cattle raising (46,000 head in 2006), small industries and agriculture. The main crops are bananas, citrus fruits, mangoes, beans, sugarcane, and corn. The local rum (cachaça) is well known. In the rural area there were 2,084 producers on 111,541 ha. Natural pasture made up 62,000 ha, woodland 35,000 ha. and planted area 7,500 ha. Around 6,000 persons worked in agriculture.

In the urban area there were 4 banking agencies in 2006. The GDP in 2005 was R$157,547.

== IBGE statistical microregion ==
Salinas is also a statistical microregion (53) consisting of 17 municipalities: Águas Vermelhas, Berizal, Curral de Dentro, Divisa Alegre, Fruta de Leite, Indaiabira, Montezuma, Ninheira, Novorizonte, Rio Pardo de Minas, Rubelita, Salinas, Santa Cruz de Salinas, Santo Antônio do Retiro, São João do Paraíso, Taiobeiras, Vargem Grande do Rio Pardo. The population of this region was 180,136 in 2000 and the area is 17,883.30 km^{2}.

== Health and education ==
This municipality is isolated from major population centers and suffers from drought and poor soils.

- Municipal Human Development Index: .699 (2000)
- State ranking: 551 out of 853 municipalities as of 2000
- National ranking: 3,015 out of 5,138 municipalities as of 2000

(For the complete list see:)

- Degree of urbanization: 71.56%
- Infant mortality rate: 21.28 (2003) The rate for Minas Gerais was 17.40; the rate for Brazil was 18.91.
- Illiteracy rate: 23.85% (15 years old or older)(2003) The rate for Minas Gerais was 11.96; the rate for Brazil was 13.63
- Urban area covered by sewage system: 60.60%--the rate for Minas Gerais was 81.39%
- Health clinics, health centers, and hospitals: 4, 6, 4 with 175 beds

== Transportation ==
Salinas is located on highway BR-251. The distance to Montes Claros is 210 km. The distance to the Rio-Bahia BR-116 is 108 km.

- Important distances: Belo Horizonte/MG 631 km; Vit. da Conquista/BA 250 km; São Paulo/SP 1210 km; Brasília/DF 720 km; and Rio de Janeiro/RJ 1070 km.

Salinas is served by Salinas Airport.

== See also ==
- List of municipalities in Minas Gerais
