= Fruta de Leite =

Municipality in Minas Gerais, Brazil

Coordinates: 16°07′03″S 42°31′25″W

- Municipality
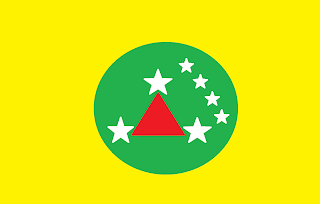
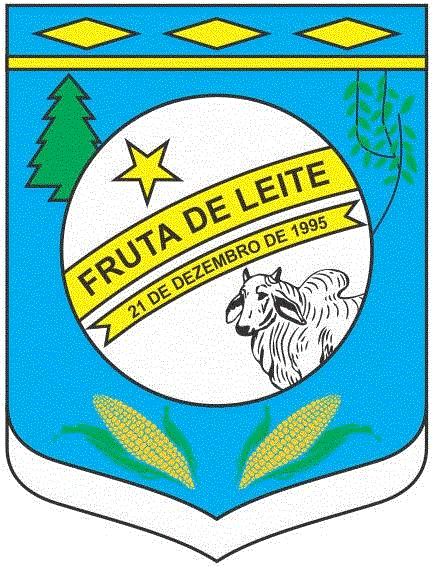
- Flag Coat of arms
- Interactive map of Fruta de Leite
- Country: Brazil
- State: Minas Gerais
- Region: Southeast
- Time zone: UTC−3 (BRT)

Location of Fruta de Leite in the state of Minas Gerais

Fruta de Leite is a municipality in the northeast of the Brazilian state of Minas Gerais. As of 2020 the population was 5,299 in a total area of 758 km^{2} (293 sq mi). The elevation is 910 metres (2,990 ft). It became a municipality in 1997. The postal code (CEP) is 39558-000.

Fruta de Leite is part of the statistical microregion of Salinas. It lies just north of the important federal highway BR-251, which links Montes Claros to the Rio-Bahia (BR-116).

Due to isolation and poor soils this is one of the poorest municipalities in the state and in the country. The main economic activities are cattle raising (31,000 head in 2006) and farming with modest production of coffee, oranges, mangoes, corn, sugarcane, and bananas. In 2006 there were 989 rural producers and a total agricultural area of 17,919 hectares (44,280 acres). Cropland made up 1,700 hectares (4,200 acres). There were only two tractors. In the urban area there were no financial institutions as of 2006. There were 85 automobiles, giving a ratio of about one automobile for every 75 inhabitants. Health care was provided by three public health clinics. Educational needs were met by nine primary schools and one middle school. There were no hospitals.

Municipal Human Development Index

- MHDI: .586 (2000)
- State ranking: 845 out of 853 municipalities
- National ranking: 4,897 out of 5,138 municipalities
- Life expectancy: 67
- Literacy rate: 55
- Combined primary, secondary and tertiary gross enrolment ratio: .736
- Per capita income (monthly): R$55.76

== See also ==
- List of municipalities in Minas Gerais
