= Medina, Minas Gerais =

Municipality in Brazil

Coordinates: 16°13′43″S 41°28′42″W

- Municipality
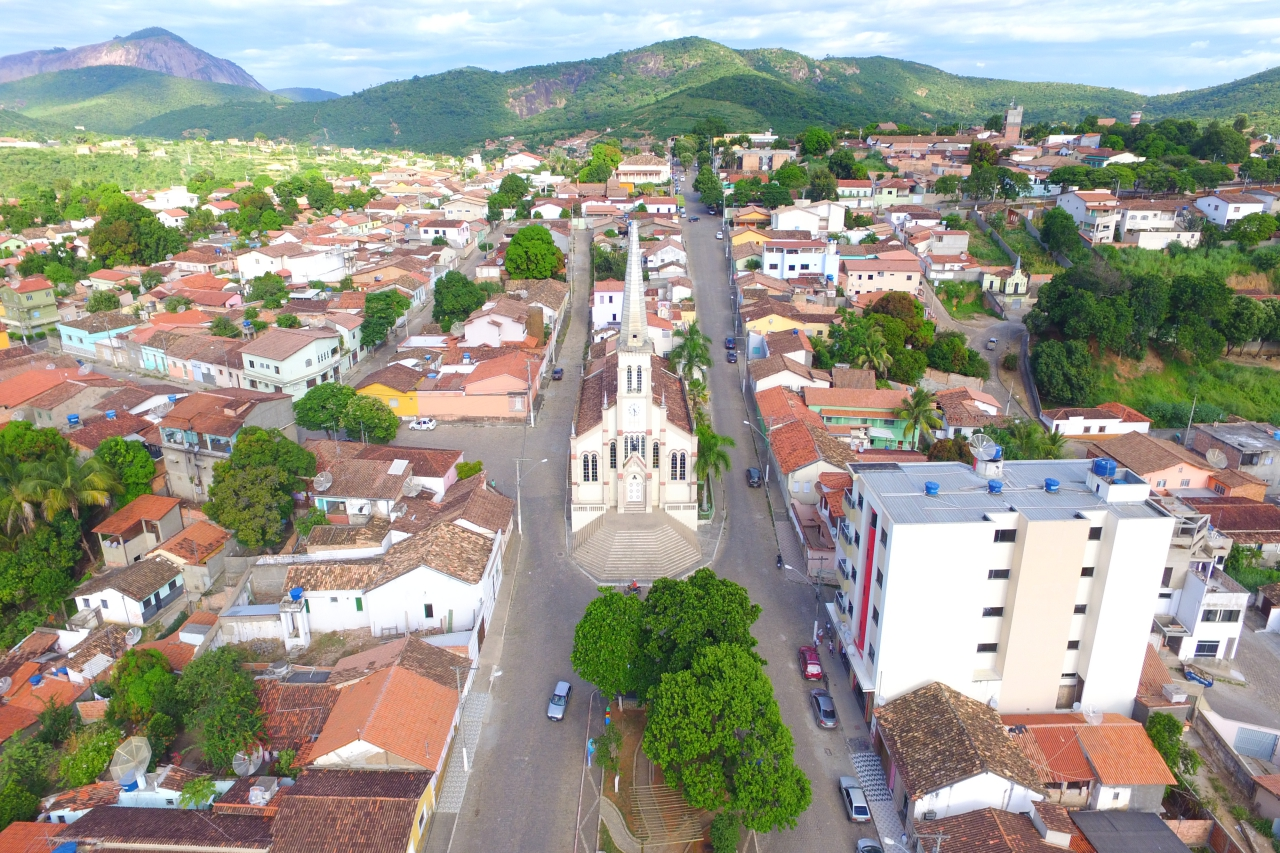
- View of the city of Medina

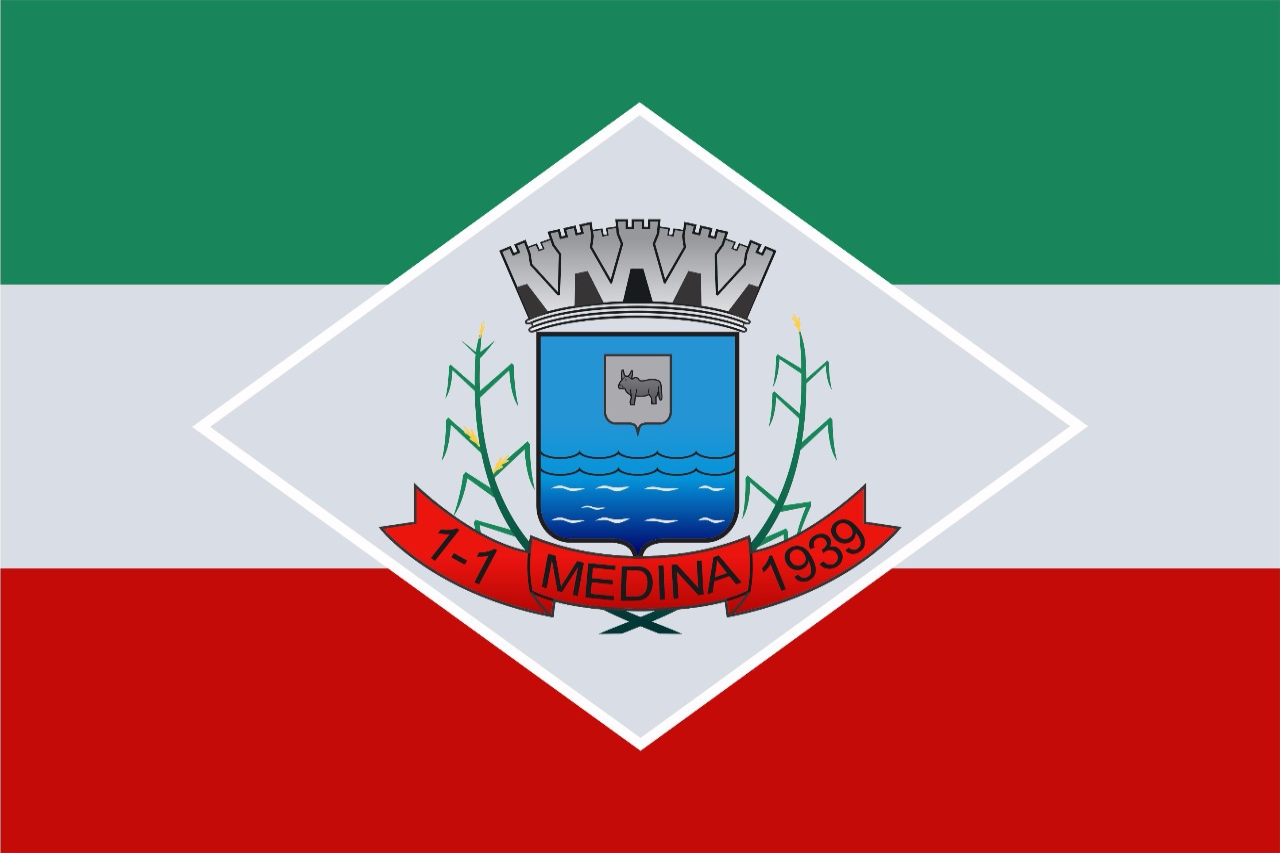
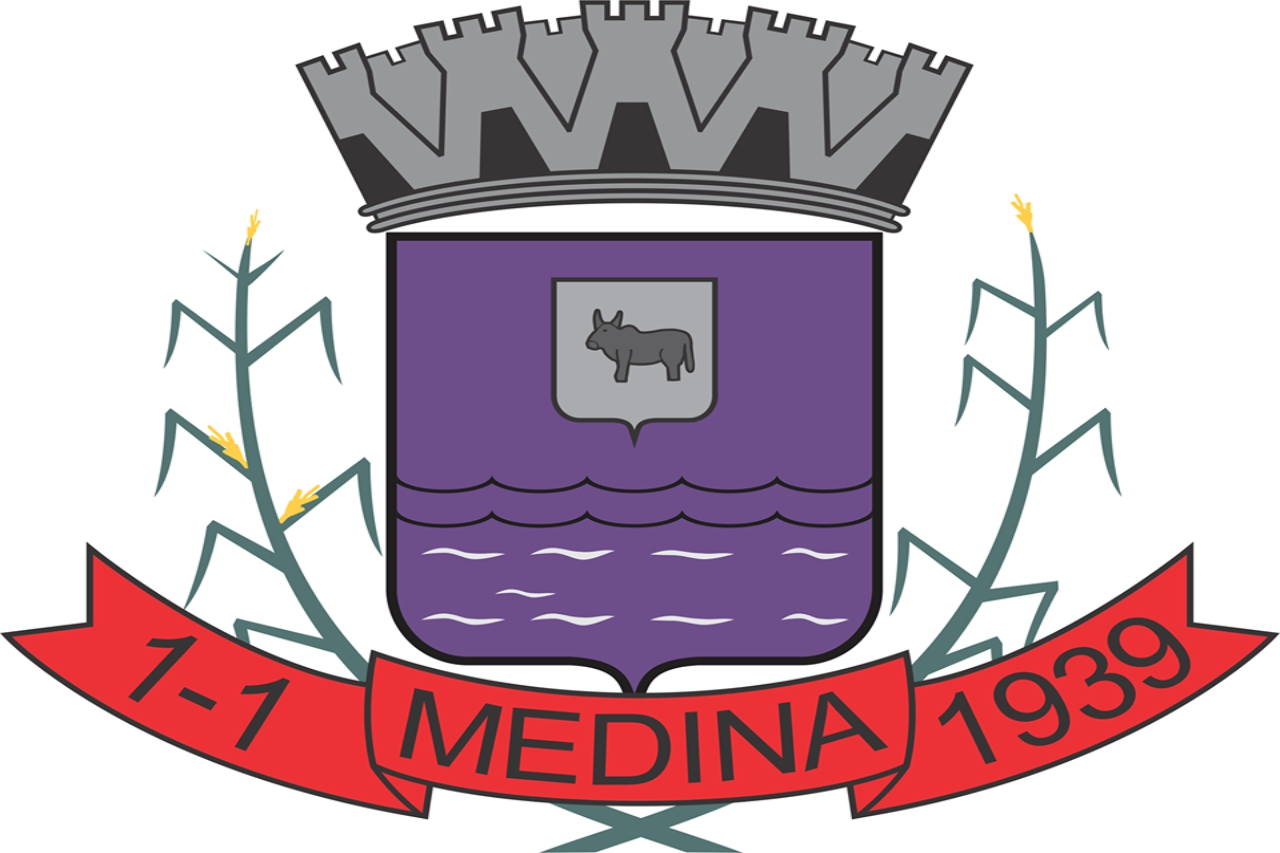
- Flag Coat of arms

- Country: Brazil
- State: Minas Gerais
- Incorporated: 17 December 1938

Government
  - Mayor: Evaldo Lucio Peixoto Sena (Republicans)

Area
  - Total: 1,435 km^{2} (554 sq mi)

Population (2022)
  - Total: 20 156
  - Density: 14.4/km^{2} (37/sq mi)
- Demonym: Medinense
- Time zone: UTC−3 (BRT)
- Postal Code: 39620-000
- Area code(s): +55 33
- Website: www.medina.mg.gov.br

Medina (Brazilian Portuguese pronunciation: [meˈd͡ʒĩnɐ]) is a Brazilian municipality located in the northeast of the state of Minas Gerais in the Jequitinhonha River valley. According to the 2022 census, the population of the municipality was 20,156 in a total area of 1,435 km^{2}. The city belongs to the mesoregion of Jequitinhonha and the microregion of Pedra Azul.

== History ==
The municipality originated from a village formed by a group of indigenous and slaves led by the Spaniard Leandro de Medina, who arrived in the region in May 1824. Since the day of their arrival coincided with the feast of Saint Rita of Cascia, this was the name given to the place. In 1847, the first mass was celebrated in the chapel of Saint Rita, built on land donated by the farmer Maria Gonçalves. The village of Santa Rita was elevated to the category of district, separating from Minas Novas and annexed to the municipality of Fortaleza (currently Pedra Azul), with the name of Santa Rita de Medina. In 1938, it was elevated to the status of municipality and was renamed Medina, and the comarca was established in 1948.

== Geography ==
The municipality is located in the Immediate Geographic Region of Pedra Azul, which is part of the Intermediate Geographic Region of Teófilo Otoni. It belongs to the Microregion of Pedra Azul and the Mesoregion of Jequitinhonha. Its population censused in 2022 was 20,156 inhabitants.

=== Hydrography ===
The municipality is bathed by the Jequitinhonha River and its tributary the São Pedro River, and several streams, the most important being the Sapucaia, Dos Cães, São Camilo and Ribeirão streams, the latter being responsible for supplying the city.

== Economy ==
The city's GDP is around R$253.1 million reais, with 41% of the added value coming from services, followed by public administration (40.4%), industry (12%) and agriculture (6.6%). The municipality's GDP per capita is R$12.2 thousand reais.

== Culture ==
The city holds the festival of the patron saint Rita of Cascia and the city's anniversary every year on May 22nd. The biggest festival held by the municipality is the Festa da Cabeça da Leitoa (lit. "Pig's Head Festival") held annually during the June festivals.

== See also ==
- List of municipalities in Minas Gerais
