= Novorizonte =

Municipality in the northeast of the Brazilian state of Minas Gerais

Coordinates: 16°00′57″S 42°23′59″W

- Municipality
- Interactive map of Novorizonte
- Country: Brazil
- State: Minas Gerais
- Region: Southeast
- Time zone: UTC−3 (BRT)

Location of Novorizonte in the state of Minas Gerais

Novorizonte is a municipality in the northeast of the Brazilian state of Minas Gerais. Its population in 2020 was 5,324 inhabitants in a total area of 264 km^{2} (102 sq mi).

Novorizonte belongs to the Salinas statistical microregion. The elevation of the municipal seat is 920 meters. It became a municipality in 1997. This municipality is located to the northwest of Salinas on MG-342. The closest population center with a hospital and banking facilities is Salinas, a distance of about 20 km.

The main economic activities are cattle raising and farming. There is still some mining of semi-precious stones. The GDP was R$12,324,000 (2005). There were no banking agencies in 2006. In the rural area there were 439 farms with around 1,400 people involved in the agricultural sector. There were 6 tractors, a ratio of one tractor for every 70 farms. The main crops were bananas, coffee, citrus fruits, mangoes, sugarcane, beans, manioc, and corn. In the health sector there were 5 health clinics. The score on the Municipal Human Development Index was 0.648. This ranked Rubelita 747 out of 853 municipalities in the state, with Poços de Caldas in first place with 0.841 and Setubinha in last place with 0.568. See Frigoletto for the complete list.

== See also ==
- List of municipalities in Minas Gerais
