= Rubelita =

Municipality in the northeast of the Brazilian state of Minas Gerais

Coordinates: 16°23′52″S 42°15′44″W

- Municipality
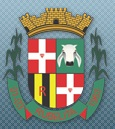
- Flag Coat of arms
- Interactive map of Rubelita
- Country: Brazil
- State: Minas Gerais
- Region: Southeast
- Time zone: UTC−3 (BRT)

Location of Rubelita in the state of Minas Gerais

Rubelita is a municipality in the northeast of the Brazilian state of Minas Gerais. Its population in 2020 was 5,798 inhabitants in a total area of 1,109 km^{2}.

Rubelita belongs to the Salinas statistical microregion. The elevation of the municipal seat is 438 meters. It became a municipality in 1962.

The main economic activities are cattle raising and farming. There is still some mining of semi-precious stones. The GDP was R$24,235,000 (2005). There was 1 banking agency in 2006. In the rural area there were 1,423 farms with over 3,000 people involved in the agricultural sector. There were 33 tractors. The main crops were coffee, citrus fruits, mangoes, sugarcane, beans, manioc, and corn. In the health sector there were 8 health clinics. The score on the Municipal Human Development Index was 0.660. This ranked Rubelita 708 out of 853 municipalities in the state, with Poços de Caldas in first place with 0.841 and Setubinha in last place with 0.568. See Frigoletto for the complete list.

== See also ==
- List of municipalities in Minas Gerais
