= Montezuma, Minas Gerais =

Montezuma
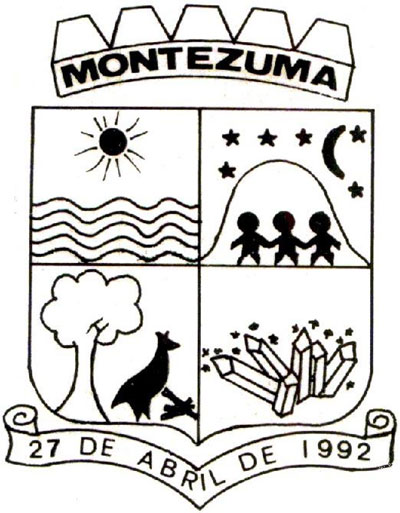
- Coat of arms
- Nickname: Hot Waters Portuguese: Águas Quentes
- Motto(s): Portuguese: União, Ordem e Progresso (Union, Order and Progress)
- Location in Brazil
- Coordinates: 15°10′19″S 42°29′49″W
- Country: Brazil
- Region: Southeast
- State: Minas Gerais
- Mesoregion: North of Minas Gerais
- Microregion: Salinas
- Established: 1890
- Founded: 1 January 1993

Government
  - Mayor: Fabiano Costa Soares (SD)

Area
  - Total: 1,133,739 km^{2} (437,739 sq mi)
- Elevation: 910 m (2,990 ft)

Population (2020)
  - Total: 8,315
- Time zone: UTC−3 (BRT)
- HDI (2000): 0.589
- Website: Montezuma, Minas Gerais

Montezuma is a municipality in the northeast of the Brazilian state of Minas Gerais. It is isolated, and the inhabitants are poor, mainly engaged in cattle raising and small-scale farming. It became a municipality in 1993.

== Geography ==
Montezuma is part of the statistical microregion of Salinas. It is connected by poor roads to the regional center of Espinosa to the northwest. It is 17 km (11 mi) south of the boundary with the state of Bahia. The municipality contains about 55% of the 38,177 hectares (94,340 acres) Nascentes Geraizeiras Sustainable Development Reserve, created in 2014. The reserve protects an area of the cerrado biome. The elevation is 850 m (2,789 ft).

== Demographics ==
As of 2020 the population was 8,315 in a total area of 1,134 km^{2} (438 sq mi). This is one of the poorest municipalities in the state and in the country. The main economic activities are cattle raising (7,000 head in 2006) and farming with modest production of sugarcane, corn, and rice. In 2006, there were 1,058 rural producers with a total area of 32,633 hectares (80,640 acres). Cropland made up 2,800 hectares (6,900 acres). There were only 18 tractors. In the urban area there were no financial institutions as of 2006. There were 116 automobiles, giving a ratio of about one automobile for every 62 inhabitants. Health care was provided by 3 public health clinics. There were no hospitals.

== Human Development Index ==
- Municipal Human Development Index: .589 (2000)
- State ranking: 843 out of 853 municipalities as of 2000
- National ranking: 4,853 out of 5,138 municipalities as of 2000
- Life expectancy: 59
- Literacy rate: 67
- Combined primary, secondary and tertiary gross enrolment ratio: .707
- Per capita income (monthly): R$83.44 (For the complete list see Frigoletto)

Note that at last count Brazil had 5,561 municipalities while Minas Gerais still had 853.

The above figures can be compared with those of Poços de Caldas, which had an MHDI of .841, the highest in the state of Minas Gerais. The highest in the country was São Caetano do Sul in the state of São Paulo with an MHDI of .919. The lowest was Manari in the state of Pernambuco with an MHDI of .467 out of a total of 5,504 municipalities in the country as of 2004. At last count Brazil had 5,561 municipalities so this might have changed at the time of this writing.

== See also ==
- List of municipalities in Minas Gerais

== Sources ==
- RDS Nascentes Geraizeiras (in Portuguese), ISA: Instituto Socioambiental
