= Pai Pedro =

Human settlement in Brazil

Coordinates: 15°30′55″S 42°55′19″W

- Municipality
- Interactive map of Pai Pedro
- Country: Brazil
- State: Minas Gerais
- Region: Southeast
- Time zone: UTC−3 (BRT)

Location of Pai Pedro in the state of Minas Gerais

Pai Pedro is a municipality in the northeast of the Brazilian state of Minas Gerais. As of 2020 the population was 6,094 in a total area of 785 km^{2} (303 sq mi). The elevation is 520 meters (1,710 ft). It became a municipality in 1997. The postal code (CEP) is 39517-000.

Pai Pedro is part of the statistical microregion of Janaúba. It is surrounded by the following municipalities: Gameleiras, Monte Azul, Catuti, Mato Verde, Porteirinha, and Jaíba. It is connected by poor roads to the regional center of Janaúba to the south. The Rio Gorutuba, a tributary of the São Francisco River flows through the municipality in a northerly direction. Pai Pedro is located on a railway line: Ferrovia Centro Atlântica. See also Estaçoes Ferroviárias

This is one of the poorest municipalities in the state and in the country. The main economic activities are cattle raising and farming with modest production of cotton, beans, corn, and sorghum. In 2006 there were 536 rural producers with a total area of 36,654 hectares (90,570 acres). Cropland made up 2,800 hectares (6,900 acres). There were only 32 tractors. In the urban area there were no financial institutions as of 2006. There were 70 automobiles, giving a ratio of about one automobile for every 90 inhabitants. Health care was provided by 3 public health clinics. There were no hospitals.

== Municipal Human Development Index ==
- MHDI: .575 (2000)
- State ranking: 850 out of 853 municipalities as of 2000
- National ranking: 5,054 out of 5,138 municipalities as of 2000
- Life expectancy: 61
- Literacy rate: 60
- Combined primary, secondary and tertiary gross enrolment ratio: .704
- Per capita income (monthly): R$71.50 (For the complete list see Frigoletto)

At last count Brazil had 5,561 municipalities while Minas Gerais still had 853.

== See also ==
- List of municipalities in Minas Gerais
