= Gameleiras =

Human settlement in Brazil

Coordinates: 15°04′57″S 43°07′27″W

- Municipality
- Interactive map of Gameleiras
- Country: Brazil
- State: Minas Gerais
- Region: Southeast
- Time zone: UTC−3 (BRT)

Location of Gameleiras in the state of Minas Gerais

Gameleiras is a municipality in the northeast of the Brazilian state of Minas Gerais. As of 2020 the population was 5,096 in a total area of 1,733 km^{2} (669 sq mi). The elevation is 540 meters. It became a municipality in 1997. The postal code (CEP) is 39505-000.

Gameleiras is part of the statistical microregion of Janaúba. It is surrounded by the following municipalities:

- West: the state of Bahia
- Southeast: Jaíba
- South: Pai Pedro and Monte Azul
- East:, Mamonas
- North: Espinosa

It is connected by poor roads to the regional center of Janaúba to the south.

This is one of the poorest municipalities in the state and in the country. The main economic activities are cattle raising (31,000 head in 2006) and farming with modest production of cotton, beans, corn, and sorghum. In 2006 there were 796 rural producers with a total area of 93,157 hectares. Cropland made up 3,000 hectares. There were only 48 tractors. In the urban area there were no financial institutions as of 2006. There were 68 automobiles, giving a ratio of about one automobile for every 76 inhabitants. Health care was provided by five public health clinics. There were no hospitals.

The municipality contains part of the 53,264-hectare (131,620-acre) Caminho dos Gerais State Park, created in 2007.

== Municipal Human Development Index ==
- MHDI: .581 (2000)
- State ranking: 848 out of 853 municipalities as of 2000
- National ranking: 4,964 out of 5,138 municipalities as of 2000
- Life expectancy: 59
- Literacy rate: 64.7
- Combined primary, secondary and tertiary gross enrolment ratio: .786
- Per capita income (monthly): R$66.44 (For the complete list see Frigoletto)

== See also ==
- List of municipalities in Minas Gerais
