= Mato Verde =

Municipality of Minas Gerais, Brazil

Coordinates: 15°23′53″S 42°51′24″W

- Municipality
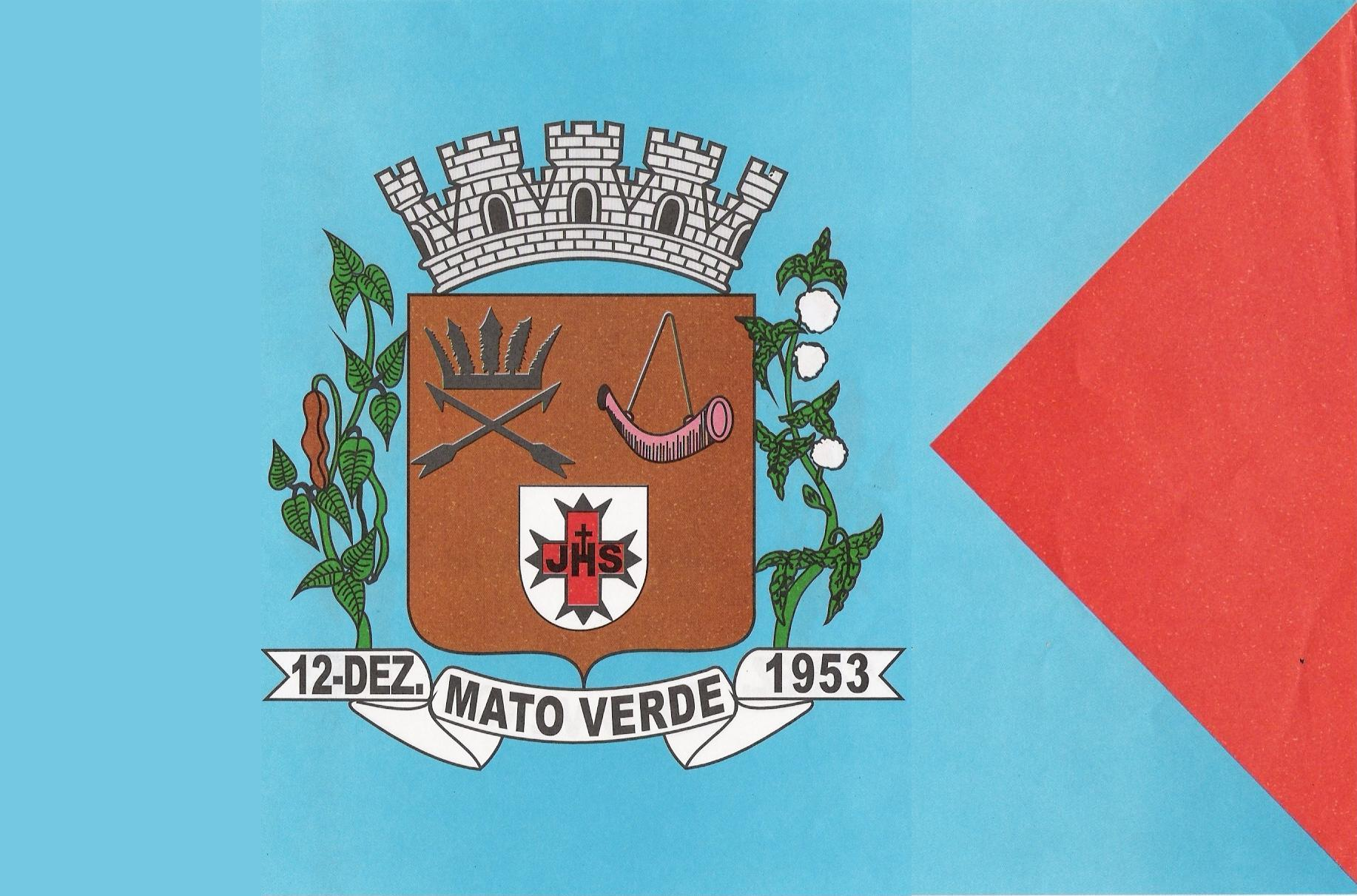
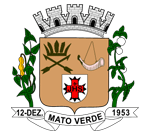
- Flag Coat of arms
- Interactive map of Mato Verde
- Country: Brazil
- State: Minas Gerais
- Region: Southeast
- Time zone: UTC−3 (BRT)

Location of Mato Verde in the state of Minas Gerais

Mato Verde is a municipality located in the north of the state of Minas Gerais in Brazil. It was founded in 1953. The population was 12,412 as of 2020 and the area was 664 km^{2} (256 sq mi). The elevation of the city is 541 metres. The postal code (CEP) is 39527-000.

== Geography ==
Mato Verde is part of the statistical microregion of Janaúba. It is surrounded by the following municipalities: Monte Azul, Porteirinha, Rio Pardo de Minas, Catuti and Pai Pedro. It is connected by paved road (BR-122) to the regional center of Janaúba to the south. The distance is 80 km. To the north lies the municipality of Monte Azul, a distance of 32 km. The distance to the state capital, Belo Horizonte, is 504 km. The distance to Montes Claros is 226 kilometres (140 mi).

The municipality contains part of the 49,830-hectare (123,100-acre) Serra Nova State Park, created in 2003. The most important touristic site is the waterfall called Cachoeira de Maria Rosa, which is located 12 kilometers from the urban area.

== Economy ==
Inadequate rainfall, isolation, and poor soils make this one of the poorest municipalities in the state and in the country. The main economic activities are cattle raising (13,500 head in 2006) and farming with modest production of cotton, rice, beans, corn, and sorghum. In 2006 there were 1,002 rural producers with a total area of 39,851 hectares. Cropland made up 4,300 hectares and natural pasture 24,500 hectares. There were only 56 tractors a ratio of one for every 200 farms. In the urban area there was one financial institution as of 2006. There were 668 automobiles, giving a ratio of about one automobile for every 19 inhabitants. The Gross Domestic Product was R$38,291,000 (2005). Health care was provided by 9 public health clinics. There was one hospital with 17 beds.

== Municipal Human Development Index ==
- MHDI: .669 (2000) In 1991 it was 580.
- State ranking: 674 out of 853 municipalities as of 2000
- National ranking: 3,472 out of 5,138 municipalities as of 2000
- Life expectancy: 68
- Literacy rate: 72.9
- Combined primary, secondary and tertiary gross enrollment ratio: .744
- Per capita income (monthly): R$109.82 (For the complete list see Frigoletto)

== See also ==
- List of municipalities in Minas Gerais
