= Mamonas =

Human settlement in Brazil

Coordinates: 15°03′26″S 42°56′23″W

- Municipality
- Interactive map of Mamonas
- Country: Brazil
- State: Minas Gerais
- Region: Southeast
- Time zone: UTC−3 (BRT)

Location of Mamonas in the state of Minas Gerais

Mamonas is a municipality in the north of the Brazilian state of Minas Gerais. As of 2020 the population was 6,554 in a total area of 290 km^{2}. The elevation is 681 meters. It became a municipality in 1993. The postal code (CEP) is 39516-000.

The municipality contains part of the 53,264-hectare (131,620-acre) Caminho dos Gerais State Park, created in 2007. Mamonas is part of the statistical microregion of Janaúba. It is connected by poor roads to the regional center of Janaúba to the south. Neighboring municipalities are: Espinosa, Monte Azul, and Gameleiras.

With irrigation Jaíba has managed to produce a range of agricultural products. The main economic activities are cattle raising (12,000 head in 2006) and farming with production of cotton, citrus fruits, beans (1,220 ha.), corn (4,600 ha.), and sorghum. In 2006 there were 1,205 rural producers with a total area of 15,958 hectares. Cropland made up 1,800 hectares and natural pasture 10,000 hectares. There were only 5 tractors. In the urban area there were no financial institutions as of 2006. There were 240 automobiles, giving a ratio of about one automobile for every 30 inhabitants. The Gross Domestic Product was R$ 15,529,000 (2005). Health care was provided by 4 public health clinics. There were no hospitals (2005).

Municipal Human Development Index

- MHDI: .620 (2000)
- State ranking: 805 out of 853 municipalities as of 2000
- National ranking: 4,296 out of 5,138 municipalities as of 2000
- Life expectancy: 64.9
- Literacy rate: 64.2
- Combined primary, secondary and tertiary gross enrollment ratio: .716
- Per capita income (monthly): R$92.57 (For the complete list see Frigoletto)

== See also ==
- List of municipalities in Minas Gerais
