= Brejo dos Crioulos =

Brejo dos Crioulos is a quilombola community located on the banks of the Arapuim River, a left-bank tributary of the Verde Grande River, on the border of the municipalities of São João da Ponte and Varzelândia , in the North of Minas Gerais.

== History ==
The history of Brejo dos Crioulos is a story that is not yet included in the historiography of the white people who occupied Northern Minas Gerais since the early days of Portuguese colonization, around the 16th century.

According to older residents, since the mid-17th century, escaped slaves began to settle on the banks of the Peroba Lagoon, located in the lower reaches of the middle Araquém stream . The occupation of this area was made possible by the existence of a swamp in the lower reaches of the stream, conducive to the proliferation of malaria, which made it unsuitable for whites and indigenous people. Over time, many other escaped slaves went to the area, increasing the population, which by the end of the 19th century numbered 38 family lines. In this context, the families located here developed a unique system of social, cultural, and productive organization, based on African, indigenous, and Portuguese heritages.

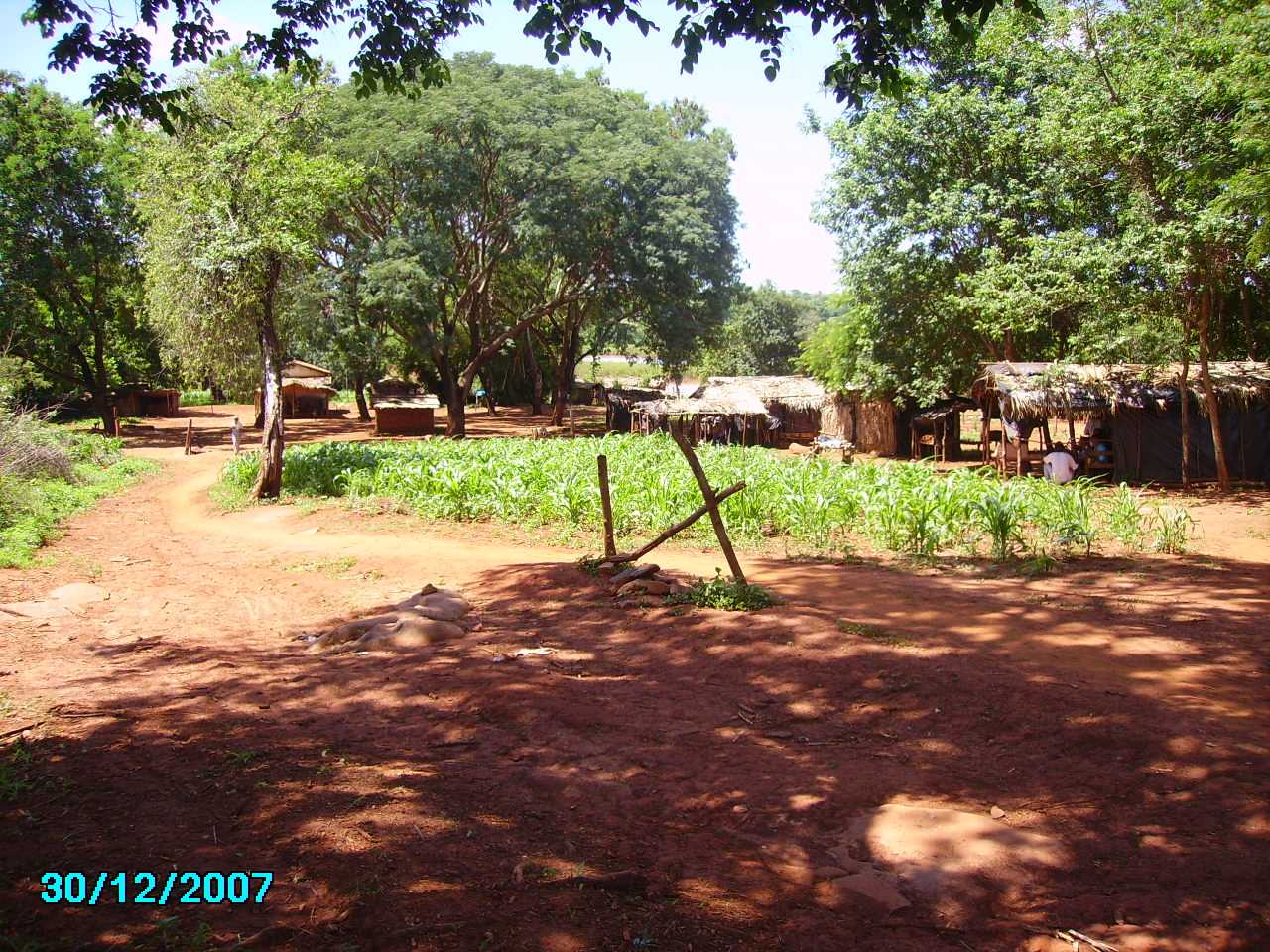
Brejo dos Crioulos

Starting in the 1960s, with the expansion of agriculture in Northern Minas Gerais, farmers, using violent means such as armed thugs, began to illegally seize and take over the lands of various families inherited from their ancestors, employing the tactic of forced sale, according to several scholars of the region.

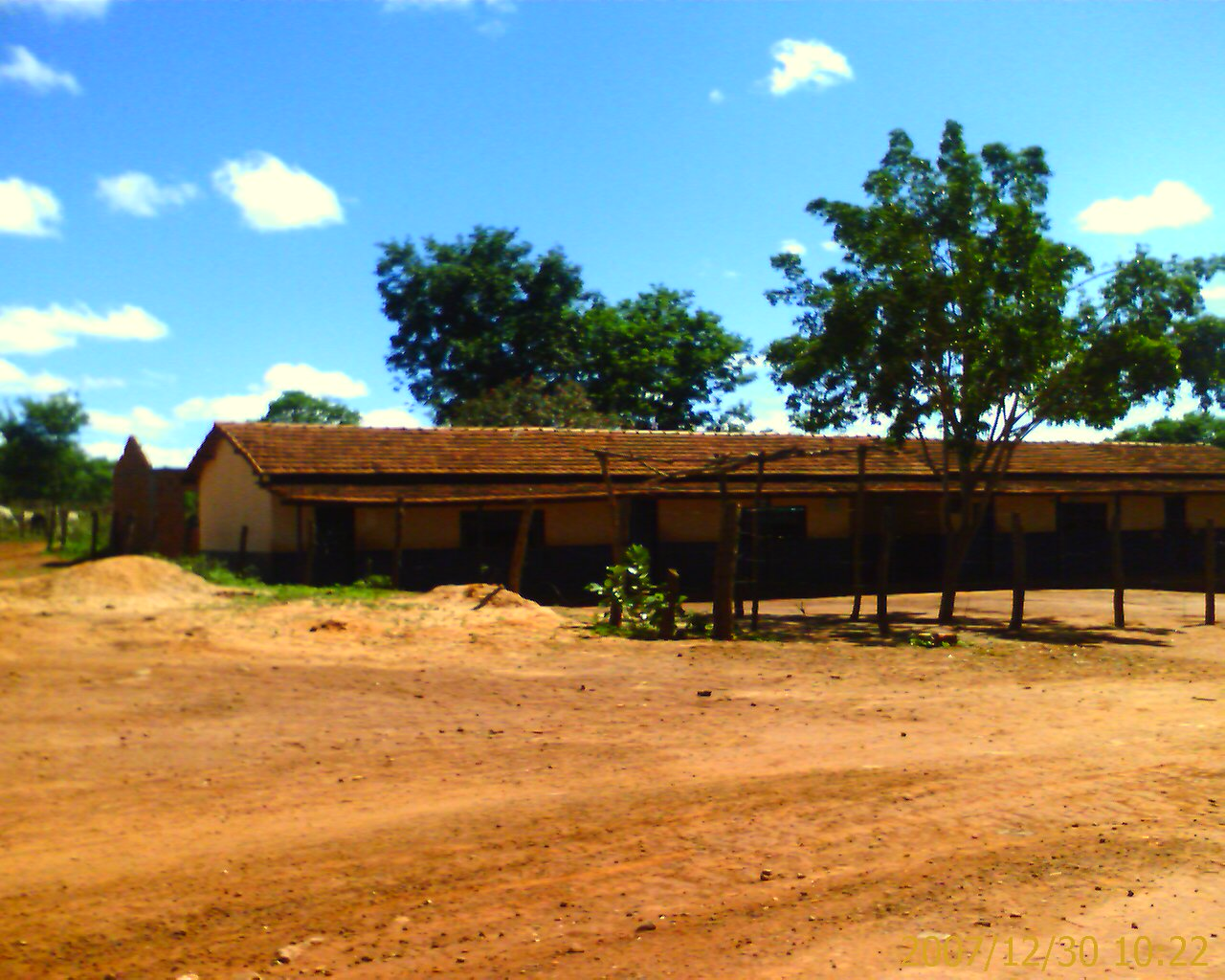
School of Brejo dos Crioulos

In the case of Brejo dos Crioulos, some families moved to other locations, while others settled on 'sacred land' existing in the locality (Sacred land consists of a plot of land donated to Bom Jesus by one of the residents as payment for a promise. With the expulsion of several families from their ancestral lands, many members of the community, not wanting to leave the territory where they had always lived, began to occupy this plot. This occupation gave rise to the village of Araruba, where the disinherited of the land reside.) Discriminated against for political reasons, the residents of Brejo dos Crioulos, pejoratively stereotyped, began to suffer exclusion and discrimination both within the municipalities where they reside and from the state and federal public authorities, who only address them with compensatory social policies but without daring to address the structural issue that would allow them to present themselves as citizens: the recovery of the territories that were shamefully expropriated from them with the connivance of the public authorities.

The three hundred remaining families of the Brejo dos Crioulos quilombo have already submitted a request to INCRA (National Institute for Colonization and Agrarian Reform) for the regularization of their lands. According to the agency, priority is given to the Brejo dos Crioulos community, which, like the Gurutubanos, has occupied farms overlapping their traditional territories in order to pressure INCRA for greater speed in the land titling processes and to be able to produce and maintain their food security. The lack of income-generating sources in the North and Northeast regions of Minas Gerais causes seasonal migration among quilombola residents, who move to São Paulo and Paraná to work in coffee harvesting and sugarcane cutting. The migrants spend six, seven, and even eight months in these jobs, losing their connection to the place and the quilombola culture.

Since September 17, 2002, the municipality has been receiving funds from INCRA (National Institute for Colonization and Agrarian Reform) earmarked for improving infrastructure in the Betânia and Conquista da Unidade settlements.

These funds are used for the construction of rural housing, opening and maintenance of roads, rural electrification, water supply systems and other support credits. The municipality also participates in the Settlement Program through the Research Development Foundation.

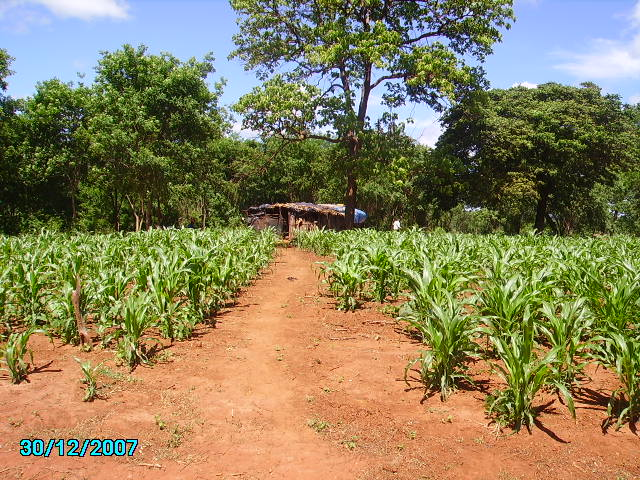

The municipality also participates in the Solidarity Fund Project in the Semi-Arid region, receiving support from the Banco do Nordeste (Northeast Bank).

"The objective of the Solidarity Funds support program, more than providing resources to existing funds, is to give visibility to experiences that confront the logic of the dominant financial system, as they are founded on solidarity, and not on exploitation and exclusion," reported Ademar Bertucci, advisor to Cáritas. The program supports the most diverse forms of productive solidarity funds: local-community rotating funds, state, regional, national funds; specific support funds (cisterns, women, seeds, rice, solidarity pastures for livestock raising, etc.); with different forms of return, including non-monetary ones.

In 2012, four members of the community were arrested and accused of murdering a gunman from a farm that bordered the territory, and which was accused of illegally seizing its land. The four quilombola were released in August 2014.
