= Janaúba massacre =

Brazil school arson attack

- Location: Janaúba, Minas Gerais, Brazil
- Date: 5 October 2017; 9 years ago 9:30 – 10:00 (BRT (UTC-3))
- Target: Employees and students from the Centro Municipal de Educação Infantil Gente Inocente
- Attack type: Arson, mass murder, murder–suicide, mass pedicide
- Weapon: Gasoline
- Deaths: 14 (including the perpetrator)
- Injuries: 37
- Perpetrator: Damião Soares dos Santos
- Motive: Unknown

On the morning of Thursday, 5 October 2017, Damião Soares dos Santos, a night watchman at daycare Centro Municipal de Educação Infantil Gente Inocente in Janaúba, Minas Gerais, Brazil, invaded a classroom where dozens of children between the ages of 3 and 7 were taking part in normal school activities. Santos locked the door and doused fuel on several children, employees and himself. The resulting fire killed fourteen, including himself, ten children and three adults and wounded thirty-seven.

== Fire ==
Prior to the fire Damião Soares dos Santos, was dismissed from work after taking annual leave the month before for a health condition. He went to the daycare to hand in his medical certificate before setting the fire. Shortly after setting the fire he also set himself on fire. A fire took over the premises, killing four children at the location, and leaving 37 injured. After being taken to the hospital, at least four more children, a teacher and the arsonist died.

At least one teacher attempted to stop him and rescued some of the children before she was overcome by injuries.

== Victims ==
A child, Matheus Felipe Rocha, 5, died on October 9, and Geni Oliveira Lopes Martins, 63, died on November 6, and Jéssica Morgana Silva Santos, a teacher, died on December 4. After the death of Gabriel Carvalho Oliveira, 5, on January 11, 2018, the death toll rose to fourteen. Some of the wounded suffered from smoke inhalation. Some victims were transferred to Santa Casa de Montes Claros, about 130 km from Janaúba. The most severely burned victims were transferred using aircraft to the João XXIII hospital in Belo Horizonte, about 550 km away, which has specialized burn care. The case moved the country and had international repercussions.

The deceased were named;

- Damião Soares dos Santos, 50, the arsonist
- Ana Clara Ferreira Silva, 4
- Luiz Davi Carlos Rodrigues, 4
- Juan Pablo Cruz dos Santos, 4
- Juan Miguel Soares Silva, 4
- Renan Nicolas Santos, 4
- Yasmin Medeiros Salvino, 4
- Cecília Davine G. Dias, 4
- Talita Vitória Bispo, 4
- Matheus Felipe Rocha, 5
- Gabriel Carvalho Oliveira, 5
- Jéssica Morgana Silva Santos, 23
- Heley de Abreu Silva Batista, teacher, 43
- Geni Oliveira Lopes Martins, 63

== Perpetrator ==
The night watchman, Damião Soares dos Santos (21 May 1967, Porteirinha, in the northern region of Minas Gerais – 5 October 2017), resided in Janaúba, in same name of Brazilian state where his family lived. He chose his father's three-year death anniversary for the daycare fire. Police found gas in his home and two days before the fire, he told his family that he was going to die and that that would be his "gift" to them. He was the youngest sibling out of eleven. According to neighbours, he was a discreet individual who sold home-made popsicles to children.

== Aftermath ==
The mayor of Janaúba, Carlos Isaildon Mendes, described the tragedy as "catastrophic." He asked for help from the state government, which provided helicopters and hospitals, and neighboring municipalities, which provided ambulances and medicine for burn victims. He also declared a seven-day mourning period. Governor Fernando Pimentel decreed official mourning for three days and determined that all state security and health forces work in the care of victims and in the investigation, as well as the creation of an emergency command post in the city.

On a Twitter post, President Michel Temer said: "I, as a father, imagine that this must be a very painful loss, I hope that these things will not happen again in Brazil. I express my solidarity with families."

On 8 October Temer granted teacher Heley de Abreu Silva Batista, who died in the fire, the National Order of Merit. In a statement, the Special Secretariat for Social Communication of the Presidency of the Republic said that the title is awarded to "those who have given examples of dedication and service to the country and Brazilian society, [such as] teacher Heley Batista, who sacrified her own life to save the lives of her students, showing courage and heroism that have touched us all." The teacher was known to have managed to save a few of the children and also for having fought against the perpetrator.

The federal government also released 8.7 million reais for the reconstruction of the burned-out daycare center and for the construction of two other educational institutions, one of which will be named after Professor Heley Batista. A memorial will also be built in honor of the victims.
