= Lontra, Minas Gerais =

Municipality in the north of the Brazilian state of Minas Gerais

Coordinates: 15°54′10″S 44°18′18″W

- Municipality
- Interactive map of Lontra, Minas Gerais
- Country: Brazil
- State: Minas Gerais
- Region: Southeast
- Time zone: UTC−3 (BRT)

Location of Lontra in the state of Minas Gerais

Lontra is a municipality in the north of the Brazilian state of Minas Gerais. As of 2020, the population was 9,714 in a total area of 257 km^{2} (99 sq mi). It became a municipality in 1993.

== Geography ==
Lontra is located at an elevation of 781 meters, 35 km. south of the São Francisco River. It is on highway BR-135, which connects Montes Claros to Januária. It belongs to the statistical microregion of Montes Claros. Neighboring municipalities are Japonvar, São João da Ponte, Ibiracatu, and Januária.

== Economy ==
The most important economic activities are cattle raising, commerce, and subsistence agriculture. The gross domestic product in 2005 was R$ 18,047,000. Lontra is in the bottom tier of municipalities in the state with regard to economic and social development. It suffers from isolation, poor soils, and periodic drought. As of 2007, there were no banking agencies in the town. There was a small retail commerce serving the surrounding area of cattle and agricultural lands. In the rural area there were 304 establishments employing about 1,300 workers. Only five of the farms had tractors. There were 115 automobiles in all of the municipality. There were 8,500 head of cattle in 2006. The crops with a planted area of more than 50 hectares were beans, sugarcane and corn.

== Health and education ==
In the health sector there were four clinics and no hospitals. In the educational sector there were eight primary schools and one middle school.

- Municipal Human Development Index: 0.643 (2000)
- State ranking: 764 out of 853 municipalities as of 2000
- National ranking: 3,871 out of 5,138 municipalities as of 2000
- Literacy rate: 67%
- Life expectancy: 67 (average of males and females)
- Urbanization rate: 64.841 (2000)
- Percentage of urban houses served by sewage system: 0.50
- Infant mortality rate: 26.55

The highest ranking municipality in Minas Gerais in 2000 was Poços de Caldas with 0.841, while the lowest was Setubinha with 0.568. Nationally the highest was São Caetano do Sul in São Paulo with 0.919, while the lowest was Setubinha.

== See also ==
- List of municipalities in Minas Gerais
