= Riacho dos Machados =

Human settlement in Brazil

Coordinates: 16°00′12″S 43°02′36″W

- Municipality
- Interactive map of Riacho dos Machados
- Country: Brazil
- State: Minas Gerais
- Region: Southeast
- Time zone: UTC−3 (BRT)

Location of Riacho dos Machados in the state of Minas Gerais

Riacho dos Machados is a municipality in the northern region of Minas Gerais, Brazil. The population in 2020 was 9,476.

== Geography ==
The municipality has area of 1,309 km². The elevation is 821 meters. It became a municipality in 1962. The postal code (CEP) is 39529-000. Porteirinha is part of the statistical microregion of Janaúba. It is southeast of Janaúba on MG-120. The distance to Janauba is 66 km. Neighboring municipalities are: Porteirinha, Janaúba, Francisco Sá, Grão Mogol, Rio Pardo de Minas, and Serranópolis de Minas. The distance to the state capital, Belo Horizonte, is 559 kilometres (347 mi).

The municipality contains part of the 49,830 hectares (123,100 acres) Serra Nova State Park, created in 2003.

== Economy ==
The main economic activities are cattle raising (20,000 head in 2006) and farming with a large production of corn (4,350 ha.) and beans (2,890 ha.) and modest production of citrus fruits, cotton, and sorghum. In the urban area there were no financial institutions as of 2006. There were 197 automobiles, giving a ratio of about one automobile for every 46 inhabitants. The Gross Domestic Product was R$ 23,238,000 (2005) a year, which was mainly generated by services and agriculture. Health care was provided by 5 public health clinics. There were no private hospitals as of 2005.

=== Farm Data for 2006 ===
- Producers: 1,193
- Area: 165,585 ha.
- Area planted in crops: 3,200 ha.
- Area of natural pasture: 17,878 ha.
- Area of woodland and forest: 134,455 ha.
- Persons occupied related to the producer: 3,829
- Salaried workers not related to the producer: 329
- Establishments with tractors: 24
- Number of tractors: 28

== Municipal Human Development Index ==
Riacho dos Machados was in the bottom 100 of the poorest municipalities in Minas Gerais

- MHDI: .603 (2000)
- State ranking: 828 out of 853 municipalities as of 2000
- National ranking: 4,601 out of 5,138 municipalities as of 2000

== See also ==
- List of municipalities in Minas Gerais

== Bibliography ==
- IBGE
