= Verdelândia =

Municipality in the north of the Brazilian state of Minas Gerais

Coordinates: 15°35′36″S 43°36′27″W

- Municipality
- Interactive map of Verdelândia
- Country: Brazil
- State: Minas Gerais
- Region: Southeast
- Time zone: UTC−3 (BRT)

Location of Verdelândia in the state of Minas Gerais

Verdelândia is a municipality in the north of the Brazilian state of Minas Gerais. As of 2020 the population was 9,443 in a total area of 1,452 km^{2} (561 sq mi). It became a municipality in 1997.

== Geography ==
Verdelândia is located at an elevation of 485 meters in the valley of the Rio Verde, a tributary of the São Francisco River. It is connected by state highway MG-401 to Janaúba and Jaíba. It belongs to the statistical microregion of Januária. Neighboring municipalities are Varzelândia, São João da Ponte, Janaúba, and Jaíba. Distances

- Belo Horizonte: 594 km.
- Janaúba: 40 km.
- Jaíba: 30 km.

== Economic activities ==
The most important economic activities are cattle raising, commerce, and subsistence agriculture. The GDP in 2005 was R$ 37,844,000. Verdelândia is in the bottom tier of municipalities in the state with regard to economic and social development. It suffers from isolation, poor soils, and periodic drought. As of 2007 there were no banking agencies in the town. There was a small retail commerce serving the surrounding area of cattle and agricultural lands. In the rural area there were 722 establishments employing about 3,000 workers. Only 68 of the farms had tractors. There were 67 automobiles in all of the municipality, less than 1 for every 100 inhabitants. There were 61,000 head of cattle in 2006. The crops with a planted area of more than 100 hectares were beans, sugarcane, manioc, and corn.

== Health and education ==
In the health sector there were 04 clinics and no hospitals. In the educational sector there were 11 primary schools and 01 middle school.

- Municipal Human Development Index: 0.602 (2000)
- State ranking: 832 out of 853 municipalities as of 2000
- National ranking: 4,619 out of 5,138 municipalities as of 2000

The highest ranking municipality in Minas Gerais in 2000 was Poços de Caldas with 0.841, while the lowest was Setubinha with 0.568. Nationally the highest was São Caetano do Sul in São Paulo with 0.919, while the lowest was Setubinha. In more recent statistics (considering 5,507 municipalities) Manari in the state of Pernambuco has the lowest rating in the country—0,467—putting it in last place.

- Literacy rate: 60%
- Life expectancy: 66.8 (average of males and females)
- Urbanization rate: 51.36%
- Percentage of urban houses connected to sewage system: 1.30
- Infant mortality rate: n/a

== See also ==
- List of municipalities in Minas Gerais
