= Nova Porteirinha =

Human settlement in Brazil

Coordinates: 15°48′16″S 43°17′09″W

- Municipality
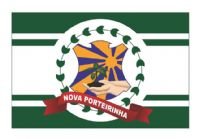
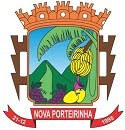
- Flag Coat of arms
- Interactive map of Nova Porteirinha
- Country: Brazil
- State: Minas Gerais
- Region: Southeast
- Time zone: UTC−3 (BRT)

Location of Nova Porteirinha in the state of Minas Gerais

Nova Porteirinha is a municipality in the north of the state of Minas Gerais in Brazil. The population in 2020 was 7,497 in an area of 121 km^{2} (47 sq mi). The elevation is 533 meters (1,749 ft). It became a municipality in 1997. The postal code (CEP) is 39525-000.

Nova Porteirinha is part of the statistical microregion of Janaúba. It is surrounded by the municipalities of Janaúba and Porteirinha. It is across the Rio Gorutuba from the city of Janaúba.

The main economic activities are cattle raising (4,700 head in 2006) and farming with a large production of bananas (1,650 ha (4,100 acres)) and modest production of tropical fruits, sugarcane, corn, and coconuts. In 2006 there were 644 rural producers with a total area of 9,700 ha (24,000 acres). Cropland made up 4,000 ha (9,900 acres) and natural pasture 3,000 ha (7,400 acres) hectares. There were only 59 tractors, a ratio of one for every 10 farms. In the urban area there were no financial institutions as of 2006. There were 171 automobiles, giving a ratio of about one automobile for every 42 inhabitants. The Gross Domestic Product was R$ 40,300,000 (2005), which was mainly generated by services. Health care was provided by 6 public health clinics. There were no hospitals as of 2005.

== Municipal Human Development Index ==
- MHDI: .685 (2000)
- State ranking: 613 out of 853 municipalities as of 2000
- National ranking: 3,664 out of 5,138 municipalities as of 2000
- Life expectancy: 67.8
- Literacy rate: 77.0
- Combined primary, secondary and tertiary gross enrollment ratio: .773
- Per capita income (monthly): R$114.51 (For the complete list see Frigoletto)

== See also ==
- List of Brazilian federative units by Human Development Index
- List of municipalities in Minas Gerais
