= Catuti =

Municipality in Minas Gerais, Brazil

Coordinates: 15°21′39″S 42°57′30″W

- Municipality
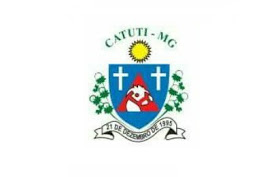
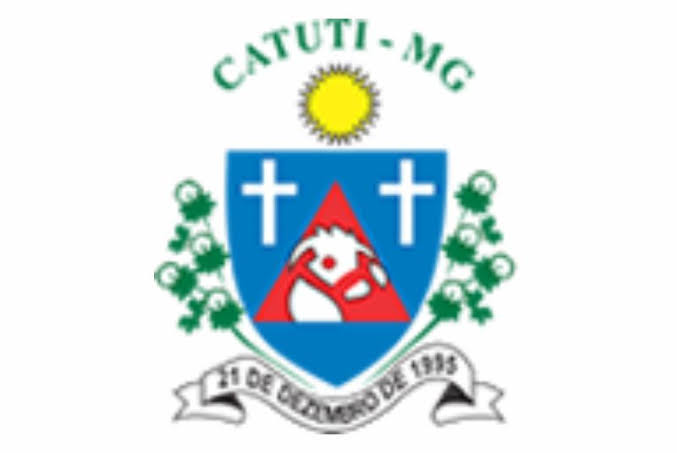
- Flag Coat of arms
- Interactive map of Catuti
- Country: Brazil
- State: Minas Gerais
- Region: Southeast
- Time zone: UTC−3 (BRT)

Location of Catuti in the state of Minas Gerais

Catuti is a municipality in the north of the Brazilian state of Minas Gerais. As of 2022, the population was 5,250 in a total area of 286 km^{2} (110 sq mi). The elevation is 518 metres (1,699 ft) It became a municipality in 1997. The postal code (CEP) is 39526-000.

Catuti is part of the statistical microregion of Janaúba. It is surrounded by the following municipalities:

- South and West: Pai Pedro
- East:, Mato Verde
- North: Monte Azul

It is connected by poor roads to the regional center of Janaúba to the south.

Inadequate rainfall, isolation, and poor soils make this one of the poorest municipalities in the state and in the country. The main economic activities are cattle raising (8,000 head in 2006) and farming with modest production of rice, beans, corn, and sorghum. In 2006, there were 772 rural producers with a total area of 27,461 hectares (67,860 acres). Cropland made up 4,100 hectares (10,000 acres) and natural pasture 13,344 hectares (32,970 acres). There were only 36 tractors, a ratio of one for every 200 farms. In the urban area there were no financial institutions as of 2006. There were 94 automobiles, giving a ratio of about one automobile for every 55 inhabitants. The Gross Domestic Product was R$3,110,000 (2005) and the GDP per capita was R$13,690 a year. Health care was provided by three public health clinics. There were no hospitals.

Municipal Human Development Index

- MHDI: .605 (2000)
- State ranking: 822 out of 853 municipalities as of 2000
- National ranking: 4,569 out of 5,138 municipalities as of 2000
- Life expectancy: 65
- Literacy rate: 62.5
- Combined primary, secondary and tertiary gross enrollment ratio: .760
- Per capita income (monthly): R$66.72

== See also ==
- List of municipalities in Minas Gerais
