= Heley de Abreu Silva Batista =

Brazilian teacher

Heley de Abreu Silva Batista ONM
- Born: Heley de Abreu Silva; 12 August 1974; Montes Claros, Minas Gerais, Brazil
- Died: 5 October 2017 (aged 43); Janaúba, Minas Gerais, Brazil
- Occupation: Teacher
- Spouse: Luiz Carlos Batista
- Children: 4

Heley de Abreu Silva Batista (12 August 1974 – 5 October 2017) was a Brazilian teacher. She gained notability after giving her own life in an act of courage to save children in the Janaúba massacre. She saved at least 25 children, being considered a heroine.

== Biography ==
As a teacher, one of her key drivers was the inclusion of disabled students, area in which she specialized in 2016.

On 5 October 2017, Silva Batista was considered a heroine for saving several children from a fire at the Gente Inocente nursery in Janaúba, Minas Gerais. Heley, who came to fight with the watchman who ignited the fire, had ninety percent of her body burned, which led to her death.

After the wake, which gathered hundreds of people at the municipal funeral home, the coffin with the body of the teacher was placed in a truck of the Fire Department and a procession was carried through the streets of the city to the São Lucas Cemetery.

In 2005, Silva Batista had lost her child, drowned in the pool of a club.

== Tribute ==
National Order of Merit

Faced with the act of bravery, considered a gesture of courage and heroism to save the lives of her students, President Michel Temer decided to grant her, post mortem, the National Order of Merit.
