= Serra Nova State Park =

State park in Minas Gerais, Brazil

- Parque Estadual de Serra Nova
- IUCN category II (national park)
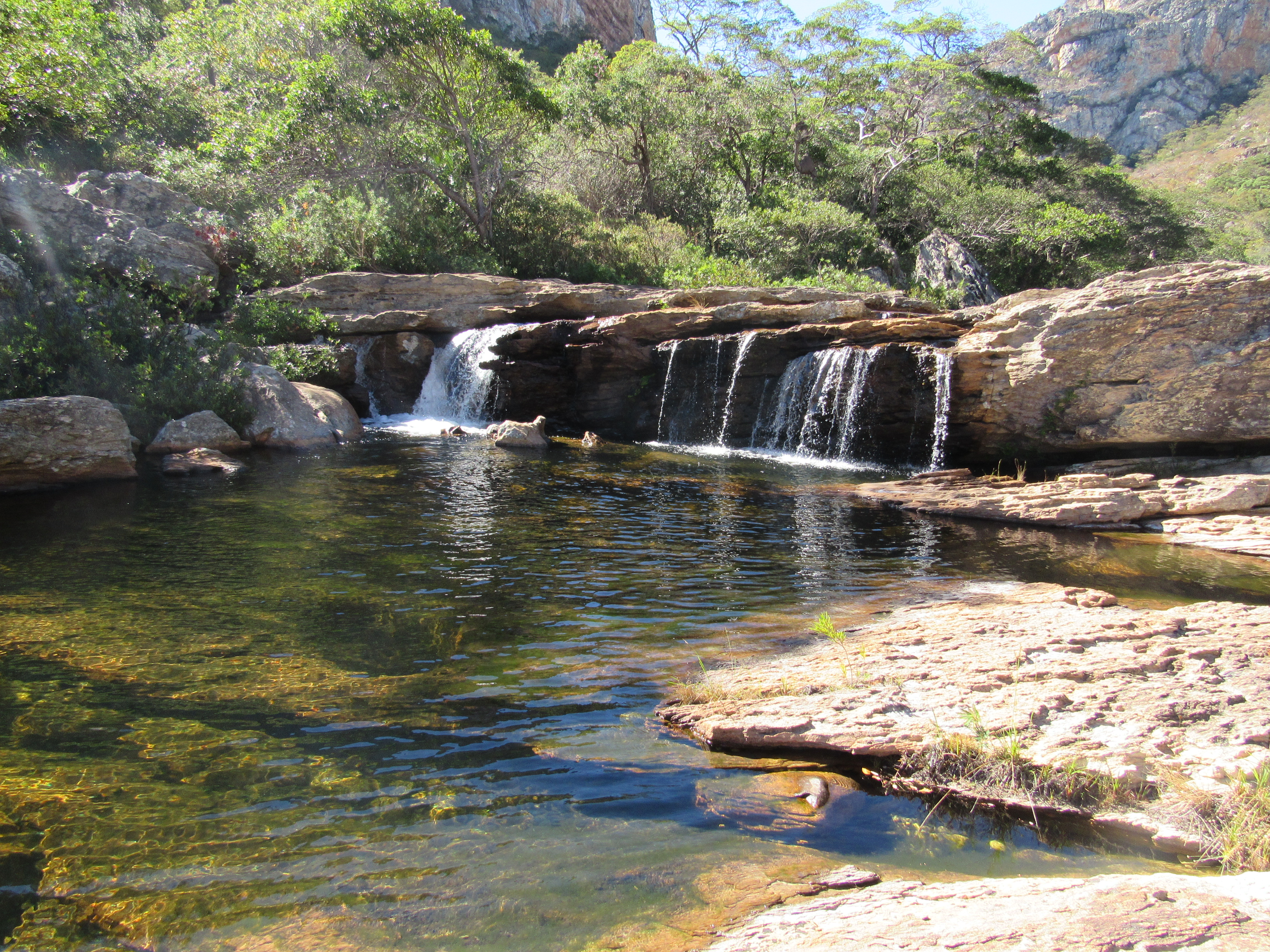
- The 4th section of the Cachoeira do Serrado, a series of waterfalls in the park

- Location within Brazil
- Nearest city: Rio Pardo de Minas, Minas Gerais
- Coordinates: 15°44′25″S 42°48′03″W
- Area: 49,830 ha (192.4 sq mi)
- Designation: State park
- Created: 21 October 2003
- Administrator: IEF: Instituto Estadual de Florestas

The Serra Nova State Park Portuguese: Parque Estadual de Serra Nova is a state park in the state of Minas Gerais, Brazil. It protects an area of rugged terrain with considerable diversity of flora and fauna.

== Location ==
The Serra Nova State Park covers 49,830 hectares (123,100 acres) in the municipalities of Rio Pardo de Minas, Porteirinha, Mato Verde, Riacho dos Machados and Serranópolis de Minas. The park is 640 kilometres (400 mi) from Belo Horizonte. It covers parts of the Serra Geral and Espinhaço Mountains, and has rugged terrain. It lies on the divide between the São Francisco River basin and the Jequitinhonha River basin. The Mosquito River cuts through the Serra do Talhado. Several springs rise in the park, including sources of the São Gonçalo stream and the Ventania, Suçuarana, Bomba, Ladim and Córrego da Velha rivers.

== History ==
The Serra Nova State Park was created by state governor decree on 21 October 2003 in the municipality of Rio Pardo de Minas, with an area of 12,658.29 hectares (31,279.3 acres). In 2008 IEF held public consultations on expanding the park to include the Serra do Talhado, and renaming the park to the Serra Nova and Talhado State Park. The expanded unit would cover about 50,000 hectares (120,000 acres). Work on the management plan for the expanded park was scheduled to start in 2010. This would include a survey of flora and fauna, defining infrastructure needs including a guard house, administrative headquarters, restrooms and so on. The park could then be opened to the public.

== Environment ==
The climate is tropical, with average annual temperature of 28 °C (82 °F). The park protects part of the Espinhaço Complex ecosystem, which is threatened by agriculture. The park's vegetation is mainly rupestrian fields, with some native trees such as Jataipeba, Aroeira and Sucupira. There are some areas of closed forest. Vegetation includes cerrado, rocky meadows and dry forest.

Fauna include cougar (Puma concolor), crab-eating fox (Cerdocyon thous), maned wolf (Chrysocyon brachyurus), ferrets, tufted capuchin (Sapajus apella), southern tamandua (Tamandua tetradactyla), helmeted manakin (Antilophia galeata), hummingbirds, salamanders and snakes such as boa constrictor (Boa constrictor), rattlesnakes, coral snake (Micrurus lemniscatus) and Bothrops jararacussu. In 2007 researchers from the PUC Minas observed 27 species of amphibians, including one that is probably new to science.

== Visiting ==
As of 2017 the park was open to visitors from 8:00 to 17:00 daily. Attractions include the Cachoeira do Serrado, Poço do Jacaré, Escorregador and Poço da Sereia waterfalls and pools. Prohibited activities included making sound recordings, practicing extreme sports such as abseiling, ziplining or climbing, bringing domestic animals, using chemical products for bathing or washing, hunting and fishing, collecting rocks, plants or animals, making fires and camping inside the park. Visitors are advised to stick to well marked trails, preferably in the company of a local guide, and to stay away from watercourses at the first sign of rain.

== Sources ==
- Diniz, Ana Elizabeth (5 November 2009), "Parque Estadual de Serra Nova: natureza mágica", Revista Ecológico (in Portuguese), archived from the original on 2017-02-02
- Parque Estadual de Serra Nova (in Portuguese), IEF: Instituto Estadual de Florestas
- "Parque Estadual Serra Nova", Porteirinha.com.br (in Portuguese), 15 October 2015
- População discute ampliação do Parque Estadual de Serra Nova, no norte de Minas (in Portuguese), IEF: Instituto Estadual de Florestas
