= Caminho dos Gerais State Park =

State park in Minas Gerais, Brazil

- Parque Estadual Caminho dos Gerais
- IUCN category II (national park)
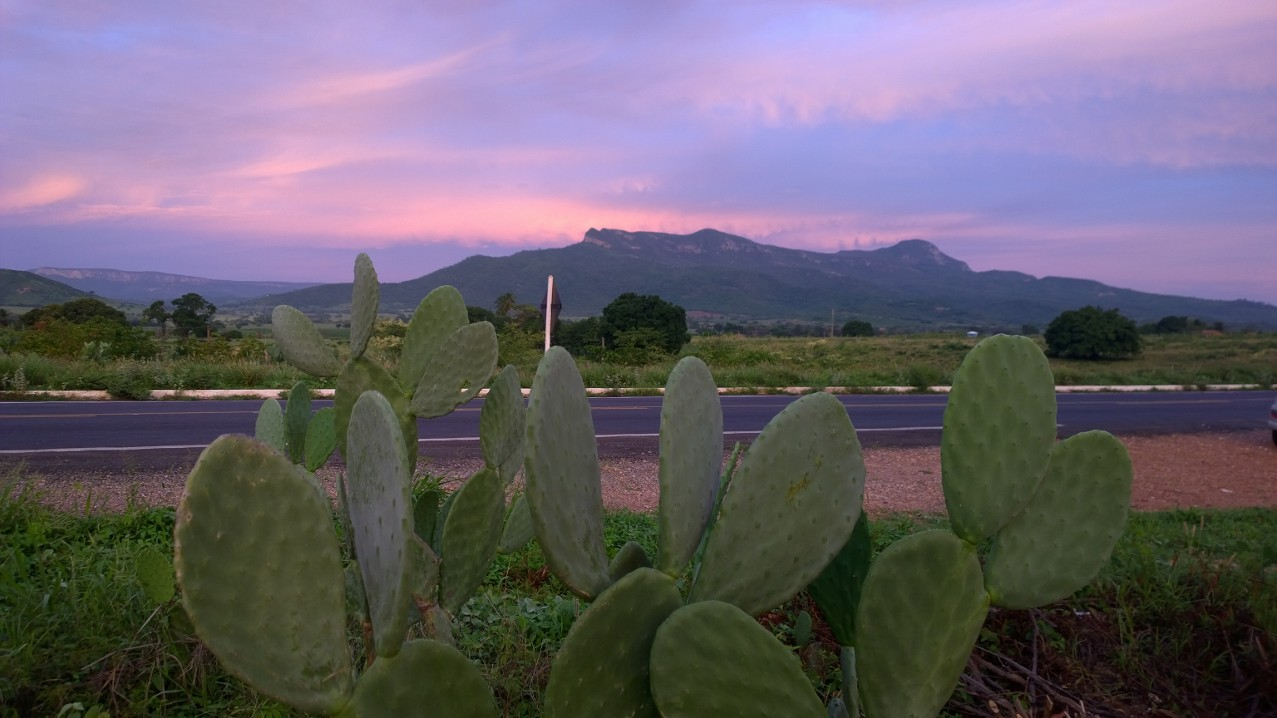
- Serra Geral in the south of the state park from highway MG 122

- Location within Brazil
- Coordinates: 15°01′55″S 43°02′46″W
- Area: 56,264 ha (217.24 sq mi)
- Designation: State park
- Created: 28 March 2007
- Administrator: Instituto Estadual de Florestas

The Caminho dos Gerais State Park Portuguese: Parque Estadual Caminho dos Gerais is a state park in the state of Minas Gerais, Brazil. It protects a mountainous area with cerrado and caatinga vegetation that is an important source of water in a dry region.

== Location ==
The Caminho dos Gerais State Park is divided between the municipalities of Espinosa: 16,696 hectares (41,260 acres), Gameleiras: 20,799 hectares (51,400 acres), Mamonas: 6,128 hectares (15,140 acres) and Monte Azul: 9,664 hectares (23,880 acres) in the north of Minas Gerais. It has an area of 53,264 hectares (131,620 acres). (Note: According to the Instituto Socioambiental the park's area is 56,237 hectares (138,960 acres).)

The park protects part of the Serra Geral, and is an extension of the Espinhaço Mountains. It covers rugged terrain with an average altitude of 1,090 metres (3,580 ft). Soils are mainly latosols, cambisols and quartzarenic neosols, with rocky outcrops. It rises dramatically from a landscape of vast plains. Its ridges, gorges, rapids, waterfalls and beautiful views give it significant tourist potential.

== History ==
Creation of the park was based on local demand, the quality of the environment, the scenic beauty and the potential for tourism. The local civil organizations, municipal authorities and elected officials asked the IEF to protect the area, which is the only source of water now that burning the cerrado for charcoal and planting eucalyptus had dried up the other sources. The Caminho dos Gerais State Park was created by governor Aécio Neves by state decree on 28 March 2007 with the purpose of protecting regional fauna, flora, and the sources of rivers and streams of the region, and of supporting and reconciling scientific, educational and recreational use with preservation of the natural heritage.

== Environment ==
The environment in the region has been adversely affected by expansion of agriculture, livestock and eucalyptus plantations without concern about their impact, particularly in the areas of chapadas. As a result, some flora and fauna are threatened with extinction, and some water courses have disappeared. The park is in an area that is still in good condition and contains rare, endemic and endangered species. The area has not been well studied by scientists.

The climate is dry, with average annual rainfall between 749 millimetres (29.5 in) in Espinosa and 916 millimetres (36.1 in) in Gameleiras. There is a well-defined rainy period. Average annual temperature is about 24 °C (75 °F). The park is the main source of water for the four municipalities, and also protects the sources of the Verde Pequeno River, a tributary of the Rio Verde Grande, which in turn is a tributary of the São Francisco River. It holds the sources of streams and rivers such as the Gameleiras, Engenho, Boa Vista, Brejo, Coronel, Jacú das Piranhas, Poço Triste, Boqueirão do Encantado, Pé de Serra, Riacho Seco, Espera and Capivara.

Vegetation includes cerrado and caatinga dry forest. The parks holds rare species such as Ipê (Tabebuia sp.), Jatobá (Hymenaea courbaril), Pequi (Caryocar brasiliense), Pacari (Lafoensia pacari), Pau santo (Kielmeyera sp.), Faveiro (Dimorphandra mollis) and Angico (Anadenanthera colubrina).

== Sources ==
- Lucas, Fernando (27 April 2007), "Parque Estadual Caminhos dos Gerais prestes a se tornar realidade", Jornal da Serra Geral (in Portuguese), archived from the original on 2017-01-31
- Neves, Aécio (28 March 2007), Decreto sem número - 28/03/2007 (PDF) (in Portuguese), State of Minas Gerais
- Parque Estadual Caminho dos Gerais (in Portuguese), IEF: Instituto Estadual de Florestas
- Parque Estadual Caminho das Gerais (in Portuguese), Via Rural, archived from the original on 2017-01-31
- PES Caminho dos Gerais (in Portuguese), ISA: Instituto Socioambiental
