= Varzelândia =

Municipality in the north of the Brazilian state of Minas Gerais

Coordinates: 15°42′17″S 44°01′42″W

- Municipality
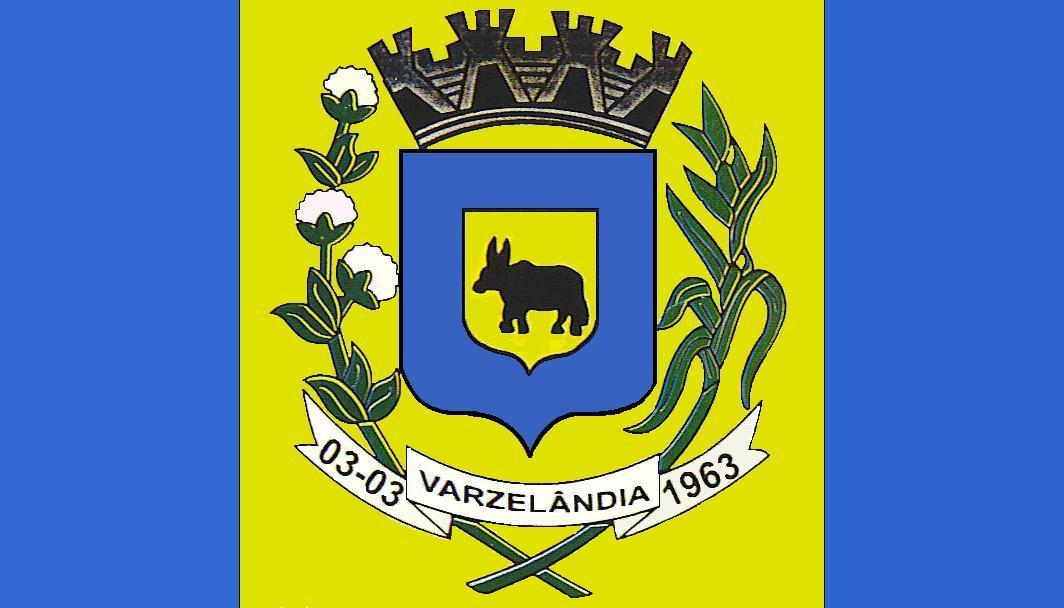
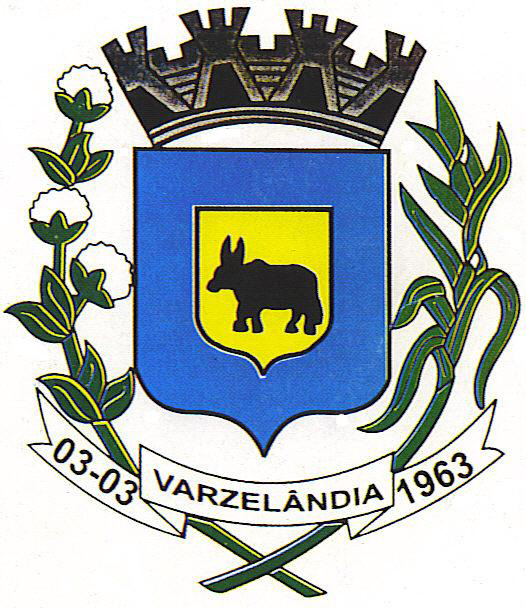
- Flag Coat of arms
- Interactive map of Varzelândia
- Country: Brazil
- State: Minas Gerais
- Region: Southeast
- Time zone: UTC−3 (BRT)

Location of Varzelândia in the state of Minas Gerais

Varzelândia is a municipality in the north of the Brazilian state of Minas Gerais. As of 2020 the population was 19,305 in a total area of 804 km^{2} (310 sq mi). It became a municipality in 1962.

== Geography ==
Varzelândia is located at an elevation of 608 meters between the São Francisco River and Brasília de Minas. It is connected by state highway (partially paved) to São Romão on the São Francisco River. It belongs to the statistical microregion of Montes Claros. Neighboring municipalities are Verdelândia, São João da Ponte, Ibiracatu, and Jaíba. Distances

- Belo Horizonte: 584 km.
- Montes Claros: 120 km.
- São João da Ponte: 24 km.

== Economic activities ==
The most important economic activities are cattle raising, commerce, and subsistence agriculture. The GDP in 2005 was R$ 51,176,000. Varzelândia is in the bottom tier of municipalities in the state with regard to economic and social development. It suffers from isolation, poor soils, and periodic drought. As of 2007 there was 01 banking agency in the town. There was a small retail commerce serving the surrounding area of cattle and agricultural lands. In the rural area there were 1,552 establishments employing about 6,200 workers. Only 26 of the farms had tractors. There were 469 automobiles in all of the municipality. There were 28,000 head of cattle in 2006. The crops with a planted area of more than 100 hectares were beans, sugarcane, manioc, and corn.

== Health and education ==
In the health sector there were 08 clinics and 01 hospital with 28 beds. In the educational sector there were 32 primary schools and 04 middle schools.

- Municipal Human Development Index: 0.631 (2000)
- State ranking: 790 out of 853 municipalities as of 2000
- National ranking: 4,109 out of 5,138 municipalities as of 2000

The highest ranking municipality in Minas Gerais in 2000 was Poços de Caldas with 0.841, while the lowest was Setubinha with 0.568. Nationally the highest was São Caetano do Sul in São Paulo with 0.919, while the lowest was Setubinha. In more recent statistics (considering 5,507 municipalities) Manari in the state of Pernambuco has the lowest rating in the country—0,467—putting it in last place.

- Literacy rate: 65%
- Life expectancy: 67 (average of males and females)
- Urbanization rate: 44.50%
- Percentage of urban houses connected to sewage system: 18.70
- Infant mortality rate: 5.92

== See also ==
- List of municipalities in Minas Gerais
