= National Order of Merit (Brazil) =

Brazilian order

National Order of Merit Ordem Nacional do Mérito
- Star of the Grand Officer grade

Awarded by President of Brazil
- Type: Order of merit
- Established: 4 September 1946
- Country: Brazil
- Eligibility: Brazilian citizens over 25 years old, foreigners
- Awarded for: Rendering services relevant to the Brazilian nation
- Classes: Grand Cross; Grand Officer; Commander; Officer; Knight
- Ribbon bar of the order

The National Order of Merit (Portuguese: Ordem Nacional do Mérito) is a decoration created to reward Brazilian citizens over 25 years of age who have rendered services relevant to the Brazilian nation, and foreigners who, according to the government, are worthy of this distinction.

== History ==
The order was created during the government of President Eurico Gaspar Dutra through Decree-Law Number 9.732 of 4 September, 1946, whose regulations were approved by Decree Number 21.854 of 26 September, 1946, and later consolidated by Decree Number 203 of 30 August, 1991. The President of Brazil is its grand master, and the necklace is always transferred to their successor.

The Council of the Order is based in the Planalto Palace and is composed of the Head of State, the President of the Permanent Commission of the Book of Merit (the Chancellor of the Order), the Ministers of State for Justice and Foreign Affairs, the Secretary General of the Presidency of the Republic, and the Chief of the Military Office of the Presidency of the Republic.

== Features ==
=== Insignia ===
The insignia of the Order consists of a gold star with six beams, enamelled in white enameled with a wreath of roses, with the center of the obverse the armillary sphere, also of gold, in a blue field, and, on the reverse, the caption: "National Order of Merit".

The necklace consists of two chains alternately ornamented with armillary and pink spheres, allegorical elements of the decoration, and from it hangs the insignia. The Grand Cross consists of the insignia pendant of a strip of scarlet color with two white lists, passed by the shoulder strap, from right to left, plus a gold plaque with the same insignia and placed to the left of the chest. The insignia of the Grand Officer and Commander hang from a ribbon around the neck, and the insignia of the Grand Officer is accompanied by a silver plaque. The insignia of Officers and Knights are pending of a ribbon tied to the left side of the chest, being that the insignia of Officers has a rosette placed on the tape.

The design was inspired by the Imperial Order of the Rose, created by Jean-Baptiste Debret in 1829 at the request of Emperor Pedro I to celebrate his marriage to Amélie of Leuchtenberg. The monogram of the emperors was replaced by the armillary sphere and the color of the ribbon (rose) changed to scarlet.

== Grades ==
The five grades are Grand Cross, Grand Officer, Commander, Officer, and Knight. The number of awards to citizens are limited to the number shown (members of the Council and awards to foreigners are not included in these limits).

Ribbons
Grand Cross; Grã-Cruz; 45 awards	Grand Officer; Grande Oficial; 150 awards	Commander; Comendador; 350 awards	Officer; Oficial; 650 awards	Knight; Cavaleiro; Unlimited awards

== Recipients ==
- Cristian Barros
- Ary Barroso
- Fernanda Montenegro
- Marcos Pontes
- Heley de Abreu Silva Batista
- Nathercia da Cunha Silveira
- Ayrton Senna
- Mário Soares
