= Ibiracatu =

Brazilian municipality located in the north of the state of Minas Gerais

Coordinates: 15°39′50″S 44°09′50″W

- Municipality
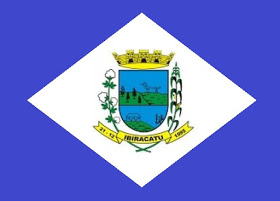
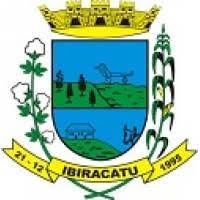
- Flag Coat of arms
- Interactive map of Ibiracatu
- Country: Brazil
- State: Minas Gerais
- Region: Southeast
- Time zone: UTC−3 (BRT)

Location of Ibiracatu within the state of Minas Gerais

Ibiracatu is a Brazilian municipality located in the north of the state of Minas Gerais. In 2020 the population was 5,369 in a total area of 359 km^{2}. It became a municipality in 1995.

== Geography ==
Ibiracatu is located 35 km. southeast of the São Francisco River. It is 05 km. off the main highway BR-135, which connects Montes Claros to Januária. The elevation of the municipal seat is 750 meters. Ibiracatu is part of the statistical microregion of Montes Claros. Neighboring municipalities are: Varzelândia, São João da Ponte, Lontra and Pedras de Maria da Cruz.

== Economy ==
The most important economic activities are cattle raising, commerce, and subsistence agriculture. The GDP in 2005 was R$15,874,000. Ibiracatu is in the bottom tier of municipalities in the state with regard to economic and social development. It suffers from isolation, poor soils, and periodic drought. As of 2007 there were no banking agencies in the town. There was a small retail commerce serving the surrounding area of cattle and agricultural lands. In the rural area there were 528 establishments employing about 1,600 workers. Only 8 of the farms had tractors. There were 84 automobiles in all of the municipality. There were 6,000 head of cattle in 2006. The crops with a planted area of more than 100 hectares were beans, sugarcane, manioc, and corn.

== Health and education ==
- Municipal Human Development Index: 0.615 (2000)
- State ranking: 812 out of 853 municipalities as of 2000
- National ranking: 4,394 out of 5,138 municipalities as of 2000
- Literacy rate: 64%
- Life expectancy: 67 (average of males and females)
- Urbanization rate: 43.71 (2000)
- Percentage of urban houses served by sewage system: 1.50
- Infant mortality rate: 29.70

The highest ranking municipality in Minas Gerais in 2000 was Poços de Caldas with 0.841, while the lowest was Setubinha with 0.568. Nationally the highest was São Caetano do Sul in São Paulo with 0.919, while the lowest was Setubinha.

In the health sector there were 4 clinics and no hospitals. In the educational sector there were 10 primary schools and 2 middle schools.

== See also ==
- List of municipalities in Minas Gerais
