= Serranópolis de Minas =

Municipality of Brazil

Coordinates: 15°48′24.2″S 42°52′22″W

- Municipality
- Interactive map of Serranópolis de Minas
- Country: Brazil
- State: Minas Gerais
- Region: Southeast
- Time zone: UTC−3 (BRT)

Location of Serranópolis de Minas in the state of Minas Gerais

Serranópolis de Minas is a municipality in the northern region of Minas Gerais, Brazil. The population in 2020 was 4,809.

== Geography ==
The municipality has an area of 553 km². The elevation is 555 meters. It became a municipality in 1997. The postal code (CEP) is 39518-000. Serranópolis de Minas is part of the statistical microregion of Janaúba.

The municipality contains part of the 49,830 hectares (123,100 acres) Serra Nova State Park, created in 2003.

== Economy ==
The main economic activities are cattle raising (12,000 head in 2006) and farming with a modest production of corn, citrus fruits, bananas, coffee, cotton, and sorghum. In the urban area there were no financial institutions as of 2006. There were 60 automobiles, giving a ratio of about one automobile for every 70 inhabitants. The Gross Domestic Product was R$ 10,494,000.00 (2005) a year, which was mainly generated by services and agriculture. Health care was provided by 3 public health clinics. There were no private hospitals as of 2005.

=== Farm Data for 2006 ===
- Producers: 533
- Area: 24,855 ha.
- Area planted in crops: 1,000 ha.
- Area of natural pasture: 14,600 ha.
- Area of woodland and forest: 7,800 ha.
- Persons occupied related to the producer: 1,145
- Salaried workers not related to the producer: 109
- Establishments with tractors: 18
- Number of tractors: 20

== Municipal Human Development Index ==
Serranópolis de Minas was in the bottom tier of the poorest municipalities in Minas Gerais

- MHDI: .655 (2000)
- State ranking: 730 out of 853 municipalities as of 2000
- National ranking: 3,695 out of 5,138 municipalities as of 2000

== See also ==
- List of municipalities in Minas Gerais
