= Janaúba =

Town in Brazil

Coordinates: 15°48′05″S 43°16′35″W

- Municipality
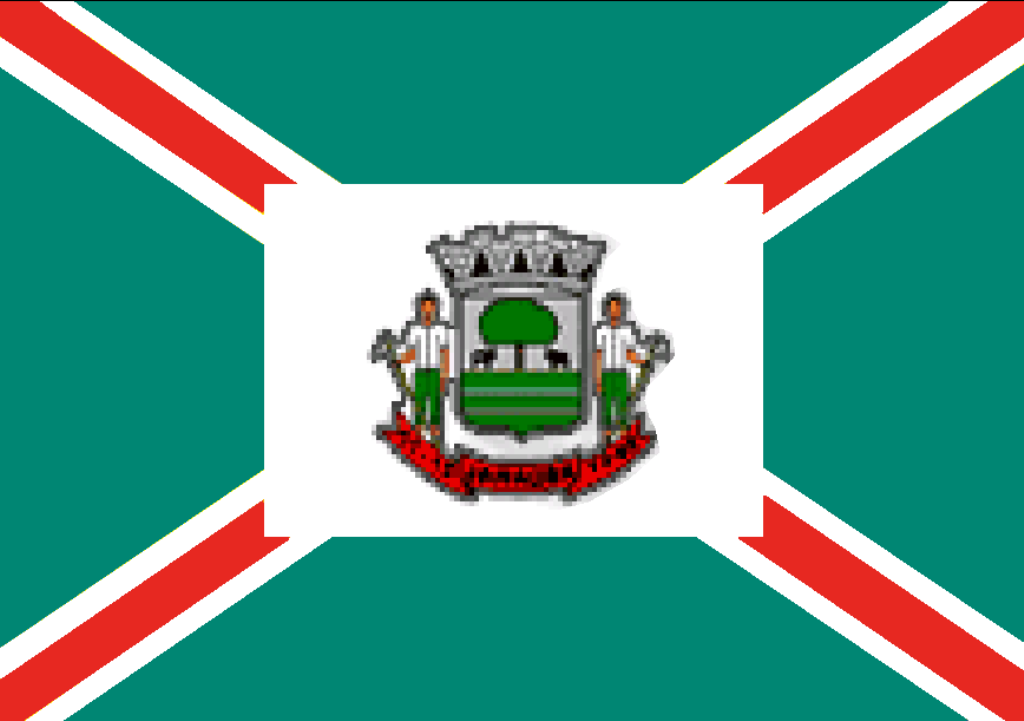
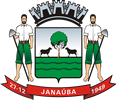
- Flag Coat of arms
- Interactive map of Janaúba
- Country: Brazil
- State: Minas Gerais
- Region: Southeast
- Time zone: UTC−3 (BRT)

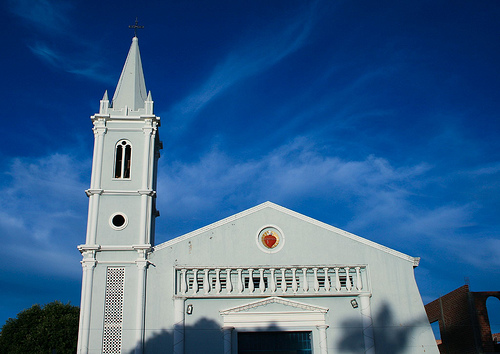
Main Church of Janaúba - Minas Gerais

Janaúba is a municipality in the north of the Brazilian state of Minas Gerais. In 2020 the population was 72,018 in a total area of 2,189 km^{2}. The elevation is 692 meters above sea level.

== Geography ==
=== Location ===
Location of Janaúba in the state of Minas Gerais

The distance to the state capital, Belo Horizonte, is 547 km. The most important city in the north of Minas, Montes Claros, is 132 km. away. Neighboring municipalities are:

- South: Francisco Sá
- Southeast: Riacho dos Machados
- East and Northeast: Porteirinha and Nova Porteirinha
- North: Jaíba
- Northwest: Verdelândia
- West: Capitão Enéas and São João da Ponte.

=== Microregion ===
Janaúba is also a statistical microregion (30) consisting of 13 municipalities: Catuti, Espinosa, Gameleiras, Jaíba, Janaúba, Mamonas, Mato Verde, Monte Azul, Nova Porteirinha, Pai Pedro, Porteirinha, Riacho dos Machados and Serranópolis de Minas. The area is 15,191.70 km² and the population was 230,786 in 2000.

=== Districts and villages ===
- Districts: Sede, Barreiro da Raiz, Quem-Quem and Vila Nova dos Poções.
- Villages: Pedra Preta, Baixa da Colônia, Algodões II, Monte Alto, Lagoa Grande, Barroquinha, Maromba, Quem-Quem, and Assentamento da Fazenda Marabá.

=== Climate ===
The climate is sub-humid to semi-arid, with irregular rainfall and occasional long periods of drought. The average annual rainfall is 1,074 millimetres or 42 inches, with a highly concentrated seasonal regime: 85% of the rain falls in the months of November to March, while 2% falls from May to August. During this period, that may include the months of September and October, the deficiency in the soils is deep and the waters of the rivers drop to critical levels.

The average annual temperature is 23 °C or 73.4 °F with little seasonal variation. It varies between 16 °C or 60.8 °F in winter and 30 °C or 86 °F in summer. In winter, due to the action of masses of polar air the temperature can reach 6 °C or 42.8 °F.

The maximum temperature varies from 33 °C or 91.4 °F to 40 °C or 104 °F. In the summer there are high temperatures, especially in the months of December to February. The climate is overall hot and dry.

Climate data for Janaúba (1991–2020 normals, extremes 1977–present)
Month	Jan	Feb	Mar	Apr	May	Jun	Jul	Aug	Sep	Oct	Nov	Dec	Year
Record high °C (°F)	40.0 (104.0)	39.6 (103.3)	39.3 (102.7)	38.2 (100.8)	36.8 (98.2)	36.1 (97.0)	36.2 (97.2)	37.9 (100.2)	40.8 (105.4)	41.6 (106.9)	41.8 (107.2)	39.4 (102.9)	41.8 (107.2)
Mean daily maximum °C (°F)	32.3 (90.1)	33.1 (91.6)	32.5 (90.5)	32.3 (90.1)	31.3 (88.3)	30.0 (86.0)	29.9 (85.8)	31.0 (87.8)	33.0 (91.4)	33.9 (93.0)	32.1 (89.8)	31.7 (89.1)	31.9 (89.4)
Mean daily minimum °C (°F)	20.6 (69.1)	20.5 (68.9)	20.7 (69.3)	20.3 (68.5)	18.6 (65.5)	17.1 (62.8)	16.4 (61.5)	16.8 (62.2)	18.6 (65.5)	20.3 (68.5)	20.7 (69.3)	20.8 (69.4)	19.3 (66.7)
Record low °C (°F)	15.1 (59.2)	15.2 (59.4)	15.2 (59.4)	13.8 (56.8)	5.2 (41.4)	7.3 (45.1)	7.8 (46.0)	10.1 (50.2)	11.4 (52.5)	10.1 (50.2)	12.8 (55.0)	14.5 (58.1)	5.2 (41.4)
Average precipitation mm (inches)	149.1 (5.87)	74.0 (2.91)	92.8 (3.65)	35.0 (1.38)	6.0 (0.24)	1.4 (0.06)	0.2 (0.01)	2.5 (0.10)	5.7 (0.22)	46.1 (1.81)	177.5 (6.99)	170.8 (6.72)	761.1 (29.96)
Average relative humidity (%)	68	64	66.2	62.8	—	56.8	53.4	48.6	47.4	50.4	65.1	71.3	—
Mean monthly sunshine hours	229.4	232.3	237.6	245.6	263.7	263.2	270.1	282.1	257.5	242.7	184.1	188.7	2,897
Source: Instituto Nacional de Meteorologia (humidity and sun 1981–2010)

== Economy ==
The main economic activities are cattle raising and the growing of grains. In 2006 there were 111,000 head of cattle. The main agricultural products were bananas (2,170 hectares), grapes, mangoes, and coconut.

There were 308 transformation industries employing more than 2,700 people. There was a Dow Chemical facility producing cleaning products. Other industries produced furniture, soft drinks, perfumes, animal food, and clothing. Due to the poor soils sand is one of the most important natural resources, and is exported to all the state for use in civil construction. Clay is also abundant and is used in the manufacturing of bricks and tiles, as well as in pieces of local ceramic.

== Festivals ==
Janaúba is well known for its carnival festivities, known as "Janafolia". An event that attracts many visitors is the Agricultural Fair, which is now in its twentieth year.

== Health and education ==
There were 2 hospitals with 101 beds, together with 7 health centers in the urban area and 3 in the rural zone. According to the official site of the city the educational level of the general population is low, especially the older rural inhabitants who can usually only write their own name. The city offers 7 courses to teach its citizens to read and write. In the school system there were 39 primary schools and 7 middle schools (2006). There were also 6 majors offered by private schools of higher education, including a major in agronomy.

Municipal Human Development Index

- MHDI: .715
- State ranking: 478 out of 853 municipalities
- National ranking: 2,7081 out of 5,138 municipalities
- Life expectancy: 69
- Literacy rate: 80 For the complete list see Frigoletto

== See also ==
- List of municipalities in Minas Gerais
- Janaúba massacre
