= Espinosa, Minas Gerais =

Espinosa
- Municipality
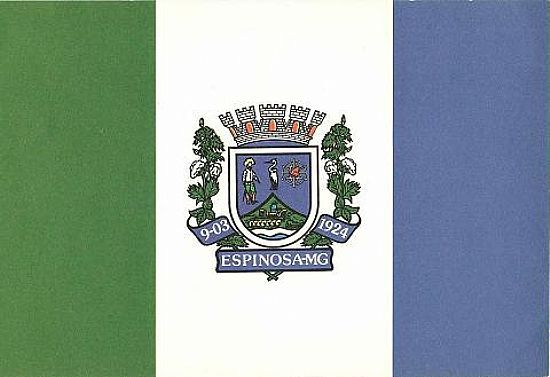
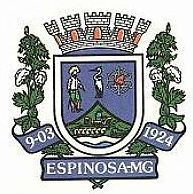
- Flag Coat of arms

- Location in Minas Gerais state

- Location in Brazil
- Coordinates: 14°54′29″S 42°48′37″W
- Country: Brazil
- Region: Southeast
- State: Minas Gerais

Area
  - Total: 1,869 km^{2} (722 sq mi)

Population (2015)
  - Total: 32,151
  - Density: 17.20/km^{2} (44.55/sq mi)
- Time zone: UTC−3 (BRT)

Espinosa is a municipality in the north of the state of Minas Gerais, Brazil. Its population was 32,151 (2015) and its area is 1,869 km^{2}. The elevation is 572 meters.

The municipality contains part of the 53,264-hectare (131,620-acre) Caminho dos Gerais State Park, created in 2007. Espinosa belongs to the IBGE microregion of Janaúba. It is connected to that city by BR-122. It is a short distance south of the boundary with the state of Bahia.

The main economic activities are cattle raising, small transformation industries, and agriculture. In 2006, there were 32,000 head of cattle. The main agricultural crops were cotton, sugarcane, corn, and sorghum. In 2007 there were two financial institutions. The GDP (2005) was R$ 84,238,000. There was one hospital with 32 beds (2005). There were 1,485 automobiles in 2007, a ratio of one automobile for every 21 inhabitants.

Municipal Human Development Index

- MHDI: .657 (2000)
- State ranking: 721 out of 853 municipalities
- National ranking: 3,661 out of 5,138 municipalities
- Life expectancy: 67
- Literacy rate: 70 For the complete list see Frigoletto

== Climate ==
Climate data for Espinosa (1981–2010)
Month	Jan	Feb	Mar	Apr	May	Jun	Jul	Aug	Sep	Oct	Nov	Dec	Year
Mean daily maximum °C (°F)	31.0 (87.8)	32.0 (89.6)	31.6 (88.9)	31.0 (87.8)	30.4 (86.7)	29.1 (84.4)	28.9 (84.0)	30.3 (86.5)	31.9 (89.4)	32.6 (90.7)	31.1 (88.0)	30.8 (87.4)	30.9 (87.6)
Daily mean °C (°F)	25.4 (77.7)	25.9 (78.6)	25.6 (78.1)	25.0 (77.0)	23.8 (74.8)	22.4 (72.3)	22.2 (72.0)	23.5 (74.3)	25.4 (77.7)	26.4 (79.5)	25.6 (78.1)	25.3 (77.5)	24.7 (76.5)
Mean daily minimum °C (°F)	20.8 (69.4)	21.2 (70.2)	21.1 (70.0)	20.3 (68.5)	18.3 (64.9)	16.6 (61.9)	16.3 (61.3)	17.5 (63.5)	19.8 (67.6)	21.2 (70.2)	21.3 (70.3)	21.0 (69.8)	19.6 (67.3)
Average precipitation mm (inches)	129.4 (5.09)	80.0 (3.15)	109.4 (4.31)	40.5 (1.59)	9.3 (0.37)	1.2 (0.05)	1.3 (0.05)	1.8 (0.07)	10.4 (0.41)	48.5 (1.91)	135.1 (5.32)	172.7 (6.80)	739.6 (29.12)
Average precipitation days (≥ 1.0 mm)	8	6	7	4	1	0	0	0	2	3	9	10	50
Average relative humidity (%)	71.3	67.6	69.8	67.2	61.9	58.3	55.1	50.3	49.8	52.9	65.6	70.5	61.7
Mean monthly sunshine hours	231.6	232.6	242.4	238.2	260.4	254.0	270.0	288.5	261.9	242.9	192.8	198.4	2,913.7
Source: Instituto Nacional de Meteorologia

== See also ==
- List of municipalities in Minas Gerais
