= São João da Ponte =

Coordinates: 15°55′49″S 44°0′22″W

- Municipality
- Interactive map of São João da Ponte
- Country: Brazil
- State: Minas Gerais

Population (2020)
  - Total: 25,098
- Time zone: UTC−3 (BRT)

Location of São João Ponte in the state of Minas Gerais

São João da Ponte is a municipality in the north of the Brazilian state of Minas Gerais. As of 2020, the population numbered 25,098 within the total area of 1,849 km^{2} (714 sq mi). The elevation is 561 meters. It became a municipality in 1943.

The city is part of the IBGE statistical microregion of Montes Claros; the distance to the city of Montes Claros is 107 kilometers. Neighboring municipalities are: Ibiracatu, Varzelândia, Verdelândia, Lontra, Japonvar, Janaúba, Patis, Montes Claros and Capitão Enéas.

The principal economic activities of the municipality include cattle raising (109,000 head in 2006) and agriculture, with the main crops being rice, sugarcane, corn, sorghum, and bananas. There are also a number of small transformation industries. The GDP of the municipality is R$ 64,761,000 (as of 2005). The rural area employs as many as 11,000 workers in 3,405 establishments; however, only about 127 of the farms have tractors. There are 466 automobiles in all of the municipality.

== Health and education ==
The health care system of the municipality includes 12 clinics and one hospital with 58 beds, whereas the educational sector is based upon 50 primary schools and four middle schools.

- MHDI: .626
- State ranking: 795 out of 853 municipalities
- National ranking: 4,203 out of 5,138 municipalities
- Life expectancy: 67
- Literacy rate: 62

The highest ranking municipality in the Minas Gerais statistical region is Poços de Caldas with a MHDI of 0.841, while the lowest is Setubinha with a MHDI of 0.568 (as of 2000). Nationally, the highest is São Caetano do Sul in the São Paulo region with a value of 0.919, while the lowest was Setubinha.

== See also ==
- List of municipalities in Minas Gerais
