= Jaíba =

Municipality of Brazil

Coordinates: 15°20′17″S 43°41′03″W

- Municipality
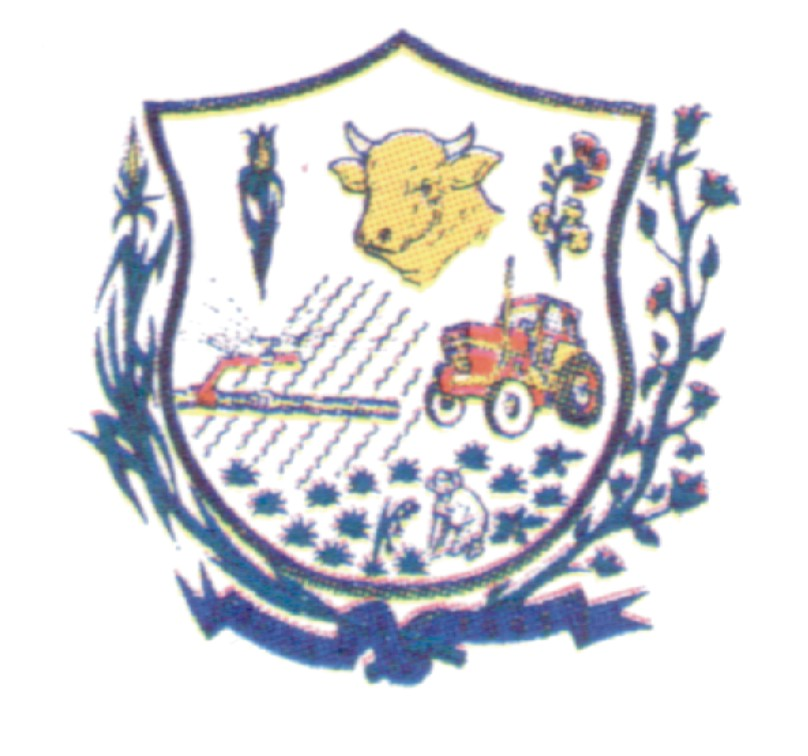
- Coat of arms
- Interactive map of Jaíba
- Country: Brazil
- State: Minas Gerais
- Region: Southeast
- Time zone: UTC−3 (BRT)

Location of Jaíba in the state of Minas Gerais

Jaíba is a municipality in the north of the Brazilian state of Minas Gerais. As of 2020 the population was 39,388 in a total area of 2,733 km^{2} (1,055 sq mi). The elevation is 475 metres (1,558 ft). It became a municipality in 1993. The postal code (CEP) is 39508–000.

Jaíba is part of the statistical microregion of Janaúba. It is connected by paved MG-401 to the regional center of Janaúba to the south. The distance is 63 km (39 mi).

With irrigation Jaíba has managed to produce a range of agricultural products. The main economic activities are cattle raising (62,000 head in 2006) and farming with production of bananas (2,000 ha (4,900 acres)), citrus fruits, mangoes (200 ha (490 acres)), rice, beans (3,480 ha (8,600 acres)), corn (1,175 ha (2,900 acres)), and sorghum (500 ha (1,200 acres)). In 2006 there were 2,173 rural producers with a total area of 118,741 hectares (293,420 acres). Cropland made up 18,000 hectares (44,000 acres) and natural pasture 57,000 hectares (140,000 acres). There were only 186 tractors.

In the urban area there were two financial institutions as of 2006. There were 852 automobiles, giving a ratio of about one automobile for every 35 inhabitants. The Gross Domestic Product was R$117,218,000 (2005). Health care was provided by 12 public health clinics and one hospital with 25 beds (2005).

Municipal Human Development Index

- MHDI: .657 (2000)
- State ranking: 739 out of 853 municipalities as of 2000
- National ranking: 3,746 out of 5,138 municipalities as of 2000
- Life expectancy: 65.4
- Literacy rate: 73.6
- Combined primary, secondary and tertiary gross enrollment ratio: .698
- Per capita income (monthly): R$110.73

== Climate ==
Climate data for Jaíba (Mocambinho) (1981–2010)
Month	Jan	Feb	Mar	Apr	May	Jun	Jul	Aug	Sep	Oct	Nov	Dec	Year
Mean daily maximum °C (°F)	32.2 (90.0)	33.0 (91.4)	32.3 (90.1)	32.3 (90.1)	31.7 (89.1)	30.8 (87.4)	30.7 (87.3)	32.1 (89.8)	33.8 (92.8)	34.4 (93.9)	32.4 (90.3)	31.8 (89.2)	32.3 (90.1)
Daily mean °C (°F)	25.6 (78.1)	25.8 (78.4)	25.5 (77.9)	25.0 (77.0)	23.7 (74.7)	22.3 (72.1)	21.9 (71.4)	23.1 (73.6)	25.2 (77.4)	26.6 (79.9)	25.8 (78.4)	25.4 (77.7)	24.7 (76.5)
Mean daily minimum °C (°F)	20.8 (69.4)	20.6 (69.1)	20.5 (68.9)	19.6 (67.3)	17.4 (63.3)	15.3 (59.5)	14.6 (58.3)	15.1 (59.2)	17.6 (63.7)	20.1 (68.2)	20.8 (69.4)	20.9 (69.6)	18.6 (65.5)
Average precipitation mm (inches)	149.5 (5.89)	95.0 (3.74)	112.0 (4.41)	54.4 (2.14)	7.9 (0.31)	1.7 (0.07)	0.8 (0.03)	1.3 (0.05)	6.7 (0.26)	58.4 (2.30)	153.7 (6.05)	192.8 (7.59)	834.2 (32.84)
Average precipitation days (≥ 1.0 mm)	9	7	9	4	1	0	0	0	1	5	10	12	58
Average relative humidity (%)	75.9	73.4	75.7	72.3	67.3	63.7	61.2	55.5	53.0	57.7	72.0	77.6	67.1
Mean monthly sunshine hours	231.7	233.7	232.2	252.9	269.6	268.6	280.2	290.2	265.7	232.1	184.1	183.5	2,924.5
Source: Instituto Nacional de Meteorologia

== See also ==
- List of municipalities in Minas Gerais
