= Porteirinha =

Human settlement in Brazil

Coordinates: 15°44′55″S 43°01′25″W

- Municipality
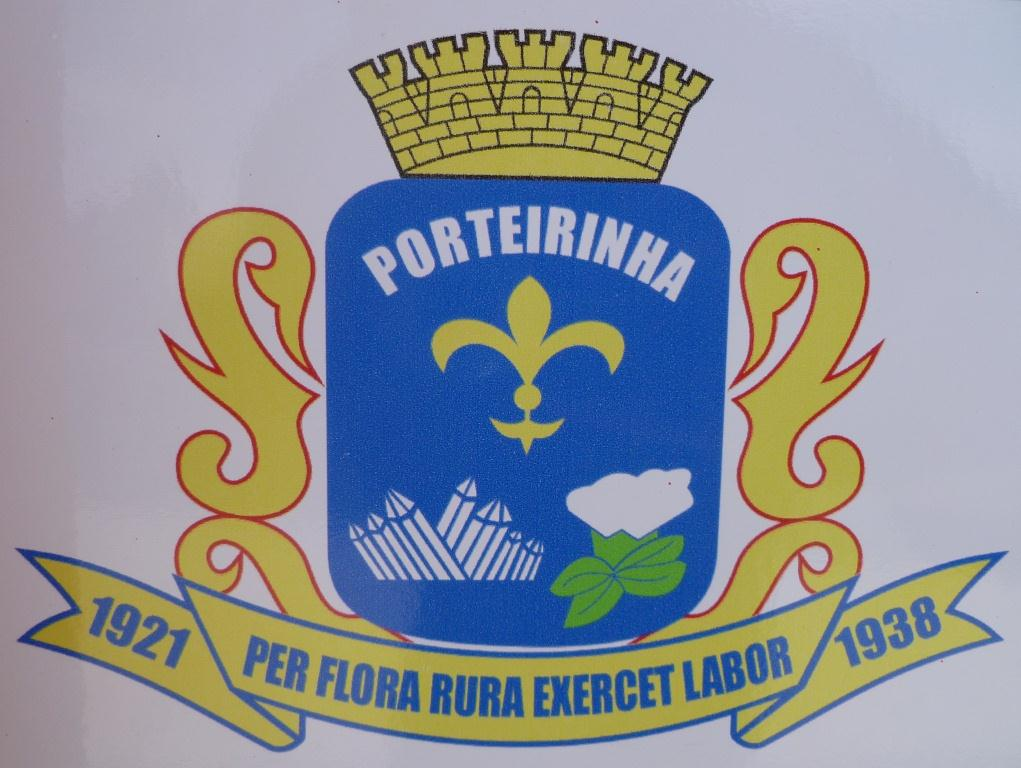
- Coat of arms
- Interactive map of Porteirinha
- Country: Brazil
- State: Minas Gerais
- Region: Southeast
- Time zone: UTC−3 (BRT)

Location of Porteirinha in the state of Minas Gerais

Porteirinha is a municipality in the northern region of Minas Gerais, Brazil. The population in 2020 was 37,864 in an area of 1,806 km^{2} (697 sq mi). The elevation is 566 meters. It became a municipality in 1938. The postal code (CEP) is 39520-000.

== Geography ==
The municipality contains part of the 49,830-hectare (123,100-acre) Serra Nova State Park, created in 2003. Porteirinha is part of the statistical microregion of Janaúba. It is 37 kilometers to the northwest of this regional center and is connected by paved highway.

== Economy ==
The main economic activities are cattle raising (50,000 head in 2006) and farming with a large production of corn (6,300 ha.) and modest production of tropical fruits, cotton, beans, and sorghum. In 2006 there were 3,517 rural producers with a total area of 100,128 hectares. Cropland made up 19,500 hectares and natural pasture 49,500 hectares. There were 129 tractors, a ratio of one for every 20 farms. In the urban area there were 3 financial institutions as of 2006. There were 1,634 automobiles, giving a ratio of about one automobile for every 21 inhabitants. The Gross Domestic Product was R$ 102,695,000 (2005) a year, which was mainly generated by services and agriculture. Health care was provided by 15 public health clinics. There was one private hospital as of 2005.

== Municipal Human Development Index ==
Porteirinha was in the bottom 100 of the poorest municipalities in Minas Gerais

- MHDI: .633 (2000)
- State ranking: 788 out of 853 municipalities as of 2000
- National ranking: 4,074 out of 5,138 municipalities as of 2000
- Life expectancy: 61.8
- Literacy rate: 72.5
- Combined primary, secondary and tertiary gross enrollment ratio: .771
- Per capita income (monthly): R$101.22 (For the complete list see Frigoletto)

== See also ==
- List of municipalities in Minas Gerais
