= Monte Azul =

- Municipality
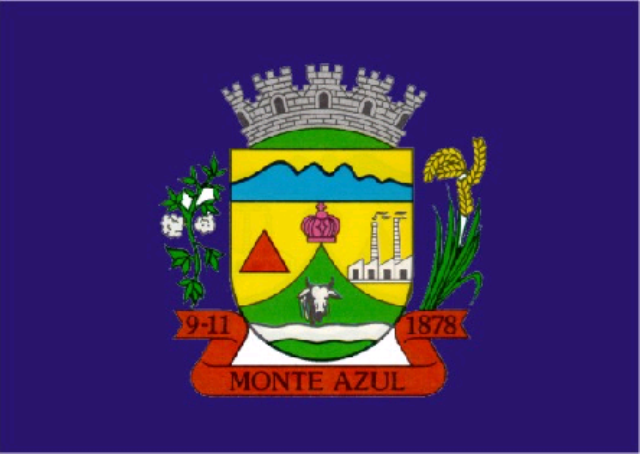
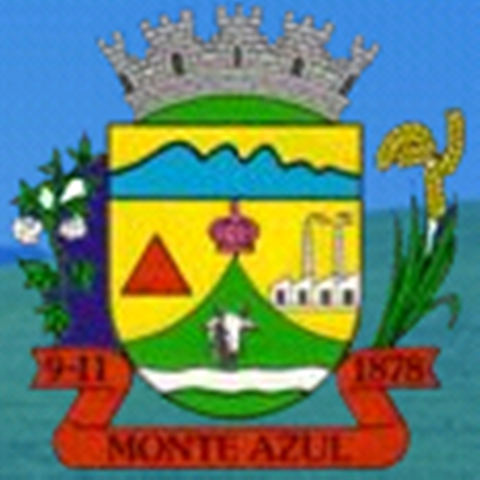
- Flag Coat of arms

- Location in Minas Gerais state

- Location in Brazil
- Coordinates: 15°9′19″S 42°51′32″W
- Country: Brazil
- Region: Southeast
- State: Minas Gerais

Government
  - Mayor: Alexandre Augusto (PMDB)

Area
  - Total: 994 km^{2} (384 sq mi)

Population (2020)
  - Total: 20,696
  - Density: 20.8/km^{2} (53.9/sq mi)
- Time zone: UTC−3 (BRT)
- Website: www.monteazul.mg.gov.br

Monte Azul is a municipality in the north of the state of Minas Gerais in Brazil. The population is 20,696 (2020 est.) in an area of 994 km^{2} (384 sq mi). The elevation is 582 meters. It became a municipality in 1878. The postal code (CEP) is 39500-000.

The municipality contains part of the 53,264-hectare (131,620-acre) Caminho dos Gerais State Park, created in 2007. Monte Azul is part of the statistical microregion of Janaúba. It is 627 km. from the state capital, Belo Horizonte and about 30 km. south of the state boundary with Bahia. It is connected by paved roads to the regional center of Janaúba to the south. It is on the Minas Gerais-Bahia railroad line, which last had passenger service in 1996.

The main economic activities are cattle raising (30,000 head in 2006) and farming with modest production of rice, beans, corn, and sorghum. In 2006, there were 2,531 rural producers with a total area of 66,342 hectares. Cropland made up 8,500 hectares and natural pasture 67,000 hectares. There were only 67 tractors, a ratio of one for every 70 farms. In the urban area, there were 2 financial institutions as of 2006. There were 1,212 automobiles, giving a ratio of about one automobile for every 19 inhabitants. The Gross Domestic Product was R$ 63,578,000 (2005), which was mainly generated by services. Health care was provided by 17 public health clinics. There was one private hospital with 17 beds (2005).

Settlement of this region goes back to colonial times. The first name was Tremedal and it belonged to the capitania of Bahia. The first chapel was built in 1818. In 1840, the district of Tremedal was transferred from Formiga (present day Montes Claros) to Grão Mogol. In 1850, it was a district of Rio Pardo de Minas. In 1878, it separated from Rio Pardo and became the municipality of Boa Vista do Tremedal. In 1887, it became a city. In 1938, the name was changed to Monte Azul because of the color of the nearby mountains.

Municipal Human Development Index

- MHDI: .657 (2000)
- State ranking: 723 out of 853 municipalities as of 2000
- National ranking: 3,664 out of 5,138 municipalities as of 2000
- Life expectancy: 67.8
- Literacy rate: 72.0
- Combined primary, secondary and tertiary gross enrollment ratio: .760
- Per capita income (monthly): R$88.75 (For the complete list see Frigoletto)

== Climate ==
Climate data for Monte Azul (1981–2010)
Month	Jan	Feb	Mar	Apr	May	Jun	Jul	Aug	Sep	Oct	Nov	Dec	Year
Mean daily maximum °C (°F)	31.0 (87.8)	31.9 (89.4)	31.3 (88.3)	30.9 (87.6)	30.1 (86.2)	28.7 (83.7)	28.7 (83.7)	29.9 (85.8)	31.7 (89.1)	32.5 (90.5)	31.0 (87.8)	30.6 (87.1)	30.7 (87.3)
Daily mean °C (°F)	25.3 (77.5)	25.8 (78.4)	25.5 (77.9)	25.2 (77.4)	24.2 (75.6)	22.8 (73.0)	22.6 (72.7)	23.5 (74.3)	25.2 (77.4)	26.3 (79.3)	25.6 (78.1)	25.2 (77.4)	24.8 (76.6)
Mean daily minimum °C (°F)	20.9 (69.6)	21.4 (70.5)	21.3 (70.3)	20.8 (69.4)	19.5 (67.1)	17.9 (64.2)	17.7 (63.9)	18.3 (64.9)	19.9 (67.8)	21.3 (70.3)	21.3 (70.3)	21.1 (70.0)	20.1 (68.2)
Average precipitation mm (inches)	132.5 (5.22)	95.9 (3.78)	117.3 (4.62)	35.2 (1.39)	5.3 (0.21)	1.2 (0.05)	0.4 (0.02)	1.4 (0.06)	13.1 (0.52)	52.8 (2.08)	138.9 (5.47)	178.1 (7.01)	772.1 (30.40)
Average precipitation days (≥ 1.0 mm)	9	8	8	3	1	0	0	0	1	4	9	11	54
Average relative humidity (%)	69.3	65.8	67.1	63.1	58.4	56.7	53.4	49.7	48.3	51.6	64.1	70.3	59.8
Mean monthly sunshine hours	224.8	216.1	231.8	243.1	254.2	257.4	269.3	278.8	256.7	238.2	185.0	188.1	2,843.5
Source: Instituto Nacional de Meteorologia

== See also ==
- List of municipalities in Minas Gerais
