= Immediate Geographic Region of Unaí =

Urban administrative region in Minas Gerais, Brazil

The Immediate Geographic Region of Unaí is one of the 3 immediate geographic regions in the Intermediate Geographic Region of Patos de Minas, one of the 70 immediate geographic regions in the Brazilian state of Minas Gerais and one of the 509 of Brazil, created by the National Institute of Geography and Statistics (IBGE) in 2017.

== Municipalities ==
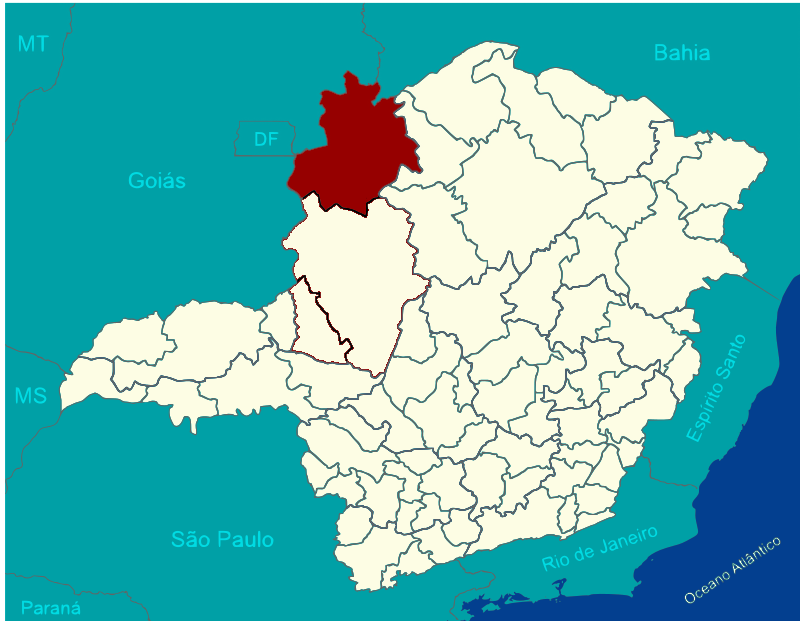
Immediate Geographic Region of Unaí, in the state of Minas Gerais, Brazil.

It comprises 11 municipalities.

- Arinos
- Bonfinópolis de Minas
- Buritis
- Cabeceira Grande
- Dom Bosco
- Formoso
- Natalândia
- Riachinho
- Unaí
- Uruana de Minas
- Urucuia

== See also ==
- List of Intermediate and Immediate Geographic Regions of Minas Gerais
