= Formoso, Minas Gerais =

Formoso
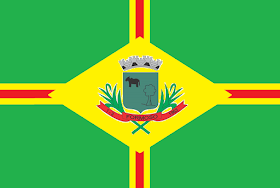
- Flag Coat of arms

- Location of Formoso in the state of Minas Gerais
- Coordinates: 14°57′08″S 46°13′54″W
- Country: Brazil
- State: Minas Gerais
- Established: 1962

Government
  - Mayor: Luís Carlos da Silva (2005–09)

Area
  - Total: 3,699 km^{2} (1,428 sq mi)
- Elevation: 839 m (2,753 ft)

Population (2020)
  - Total: 9,688
  - Density: 2.619/km^{2} (6.783/sq mi)
- Time zone: UTC−3 (BRT)
- Postal code: 38690-000

Formoso is a municipality in northern Minas Gerais state, Brazil. It is located northeast of Brasília, in a pocket where the boundaries of the states of Minas Gerais, Goiás, and Bahia come together.

Formoso is part of the statistical micro-region of Unaí, which consists of the municipalities of Arinos, Bonfinópolis de Minas, Buritis, Cabeceira Grande, Dom Bosco, Formoso, Natalândia, Unaí, and Uruana de Minas. The population of this micro-region was 133,168 (2000) in a total area of 27,653 km^{2}. The population density of the region is very low, 4.82 inhabitants/km^{2} in 2000.

There are highway connections, MG-400 then GO-108 with Sítio d'Abadia, 14 kilometers to the north in Goiás. From Sítio there are unpaved (2001) highway connections (GO-112) with Alvorada do Norte on the BR-020 highway (Salvador-Brasília), a distance of 69 kilometers.

Formoso is north of the Grande Sertão Veredas National Park, created in 1989. This park is a natural area protecting the flora and fauna of the cerrado, but not open to the public.Ambiente Brasil

== Economy ==
The economy is based on cattle raising and agriculture, especially the growing of corn, rice, and soybeans. In 2005 there were 5 small transformation industries and 74 commercial retail establishments. Public administration employed 263 workers. There were no financial institutions as of 2005. The number of motor vehicles was 116 automobiles and 49 pickup trucks in 2007.

Main crops in area in 2006

- Coffee: 115 ha.
- Oranges: 110 ha.
- Hearts of palm: 60 ha.
- Rice: 1,200 ha.
- Beans: 2,300 ha.
- Corn: 6,100 ha.
- Soybeans: 18,900 ha.

Farm data for 2006

- Number of farms: 598
- Agricultural area: 106,302 ha.
- Planted area: 16,600 ha.
- Area of natural pasture: 51,659
- Salaried workers: 49
- Workers who are related to producer: 1,767

== Health and education ==
- Hospitals: none (2005)
- Health clinics: 3
- Primary schools: 10
- Primary school enrollment: 1,725
- Middle schools: 1
- Middle school enrollment: 309
- Higher education: none
- Municipal Human Development Index: 695 Frigoletto

== History ==
The settlement of this region began in the second half of the eighteenth century with movement along the Picada da Bahia trail, made official in 1736 by King João V, who authorized the building of a tax collecting office on the border between Minas Gerais and Goiás, about 70 km from the present-day city of Formoso, in order to control the commerce of gold and cattle between the valley of the São Francisco River and the mines of the region of Goiás. At that time the region was occupied by ranchers from the north of Minas Gerais. The population grew slowly and in 1870 Formoso became a district belonging to the municipality of São Romão. In 1923 the district was granted status as a vila, or town. In 1962 it became a municipality.

== Climate ==
Climate data for Formoso (1981–2010)
Month	Jan	Feb	Mar	Apr	May	Jun	Jul	Aug	Sep	Oct	Nov	Dec	Year
Mean daily maximum °C (°F)	30.5 (86.9)	31.0 (87.8)	30.6 (87.1)	30.5 (86.9)	30.1 (86.2)	29.0 (84.2)	29.3 (84.7)	30.8 (87.4)	32.5 (90.5)	32.7 (90.9)	30.4 (86.7)	29.8 (85.6)	30.6 (87.1)
Daily mean °C (°F)	24.0 (75.2)	24.2 (75.6)	23.9 (75.0)	23.7 (74.7)	22.7 (72.9)	21.1 (70.0)	21.2 (70.2)	22.4 (72.3)	24.5 (76.1)	25.3 (77.5)	23.9 (75.0)	23.7 (74.7)	23.4 (74.1)
Mean daily minimum °C (°F)	19.4 (66.9)	19.4 (66.9)	19.4 (66.9)	18.7 (65.7)	17.0 (62.6)	15.1 (59.2)	14.6 (58.3)	15.5 (59.9)	17.9 (64.2)	19.5 (67.1)	19.4 (66.9)	19.5 (67.1)	18.0 (64.4)
Average precipitation mm (inches)	182.8 (7.20)	166.7 (6.56)	198 (7.8)	94.6 (3.72)	18.3 (0.72)	3.5 (0.14)	0.9 (0.04)	4.6 (0.18)	22.4 (0.88)	88.9 (3.50)	205.8 (8.10)	239.2 (9.42)	1,225.7 (48.26)
Average precipitation days (≥ 1.0 mm)	15	13	14	8	2	0	0	1	2	7	14	17	93
Average relative humidity (%)	73.4	72.2	75.0	70.8	64.4	58.7	54.6	49.0	50.2	56.3	71.5	75.4	64.3
Mean monthly sunshine hours	175.8	171.3	177.5	208.5	243.2	238.7	241.9	243.8	193.1	196.7	144.2	134.6	2,369.3
Source: Instituto Nacional de Meteorologia
