= Cabeceiras =

- Municipality
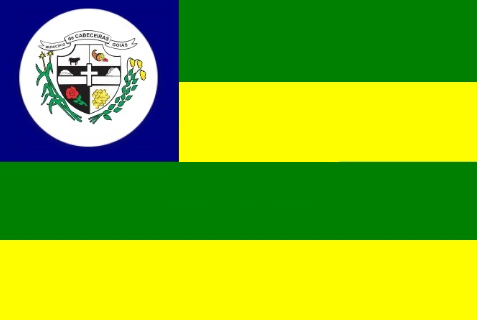
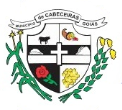
- Flag Coat of arms

- Location in Goiás state

- Location in Brazil
- Coordinates: 15°47′45″S 46°55′37″W
- Country: Brazil
- Region: Central-West
- State: Goiás
- Microregion: Entorno do Distrito Federal

Area
  - Total: 1,117.4 km^{2} (431.4 sq mi)

Population (2020)
  - Total: 8,046
  - Density: 7.201/km^{2} (18.65/sq mi)
- Time zone: UTC−3 (BRT)
- Postal code: 73870-000

Cabeceiras is a municipality in east-central Goiás state, Brazil. It is fast becoming a major producer of agricultural products using center pivot irrigation.

== Location and Highway Connections ==
Cabeceiras is located directly east of Brasília and is 38 km. south of the important BR-020 highway. The municipal boundaries are with:

- North and West: Formosa
- South and East: Buritis, Unaí and Cabeceira Grande, all being in Minas Gerais.

The distance to the state capital, Goiânia, is 344 km. Highway connections are made from Goiânia by BR-153 / Anápolis / Alexânia / BR-060 / Planaltina (DF) / Formosa / BR-020 / BR-030 / GO-34.

The most important rivers and streams in its territory are the Bezerra, Urucuia, Ribeirão Taboca, Ribeirão da Morte, Córregos Fundo, Cachoeira, Capoeira, Roncador and Salobro; and the lakes of Mato Grande, Roncador, Moirões, Formosa, Penha and Prata.

Districts, Villages, and Hamlets

- Hamlets: Cabeceira da Mata, Lagoa do Mato Grande and Olaria.

== Demographics ==
- Population density: 5.86 inhabitants/km^{2} (2007)
- Population in 1980: 4,993
- Population in 2007: 6,610
- Urban Population in 2007: 5,261
- Rural Population: 1,349
- Population growth rate: 0.93% 1996/2007

== The economy ==
Once a poor area dependent on subsistence farming and extensive but poorly managed cattle raising, the municipality concentrates the base of its economy on agriculture, which is now one of the most dynamic in the state. With a large number of farmers from the south of the country, especially Rio Grande do Sul, agriculture is characterized by use of technology for planting and preparation of the soil, which has given it a high productivity. There is great production of irrigated corn (8,300 hectares), soybeans (32,000 hectares), beans, sorghum, and even wheat.

Motor vehicles

- Automobiles: 534
- Pickup trucks: 76
- Number of inhabitants per motor vehicle: 10.8

Agricultural data 2006

- Farms: 328
- Total area: 80,030 ha.
- Area of permanent crops: 648 ha.
- Area of perennial crops: 26,168 ha. (soybeans, corn, sorghum)
- Area of pasture: 37.371 ha.
- Area of woodland and forests: 14.616 ha.
- Cattle herd: 27,983

== Health and education ==
- Infant mortality in 2000: 33.49
- Hospitals: 01 with 14 beds (2007)
- Literacy rate in 2000: 84.2
- Higher education: none (2007)
- Human Development Index: 0.695
- State ranking: 213 (out of 242 municipalities)
- National ranking: 3068 (out of 5507 municipalities)

== History ==
Cabeceiras began in 1942 with the construction of a house by Antônio Ribeiro de Andrade, nicknamed "o Bahiano", who in turn built a chapel honoring Santa Rosa de Lima, along the banks of a stream called Taboquinha. New families arrived and the name of Cabeceiras was given due to its location near the source (cabeceiras) of the stream. In 1952 the village (povoado) was elevated to the status of district (distrito). In 1958 it was dismembered from the municipality of Formosa.

== See also ==
- List of municipalities in Goiás
- Microregions of Goiás
