= Uruana de Minas =

Human settlement in Brazil

- Municipality
- Interactive map of Uruana de Minas
- Country: Brazil
- State: Minas Gerais
- Region: Southeast
- Time zone: UTC−3 (BRT)

Coordinates: 16°08′50″S 46°19′59″W

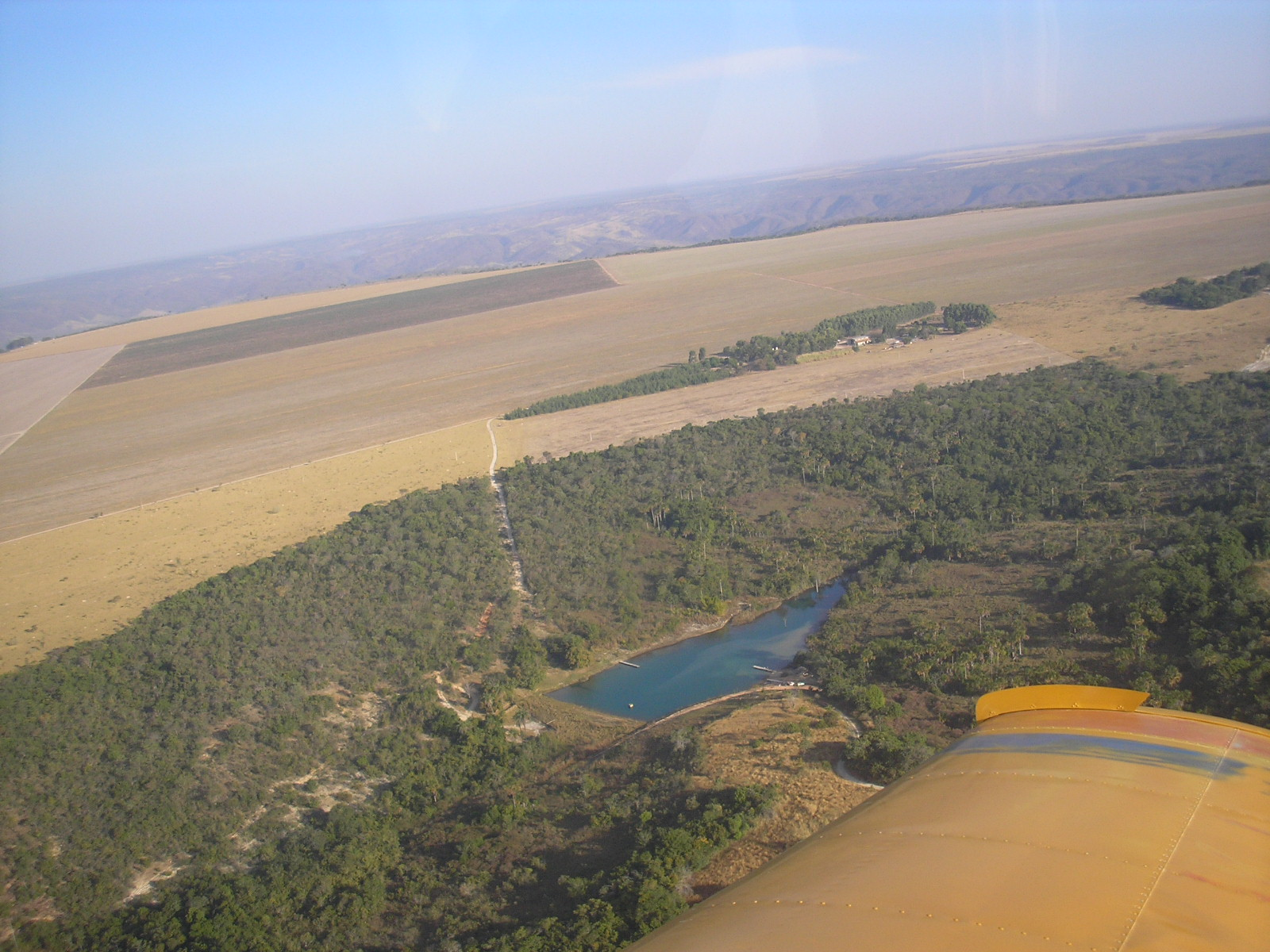
Aerial view of the farmland in Uruana de Minas

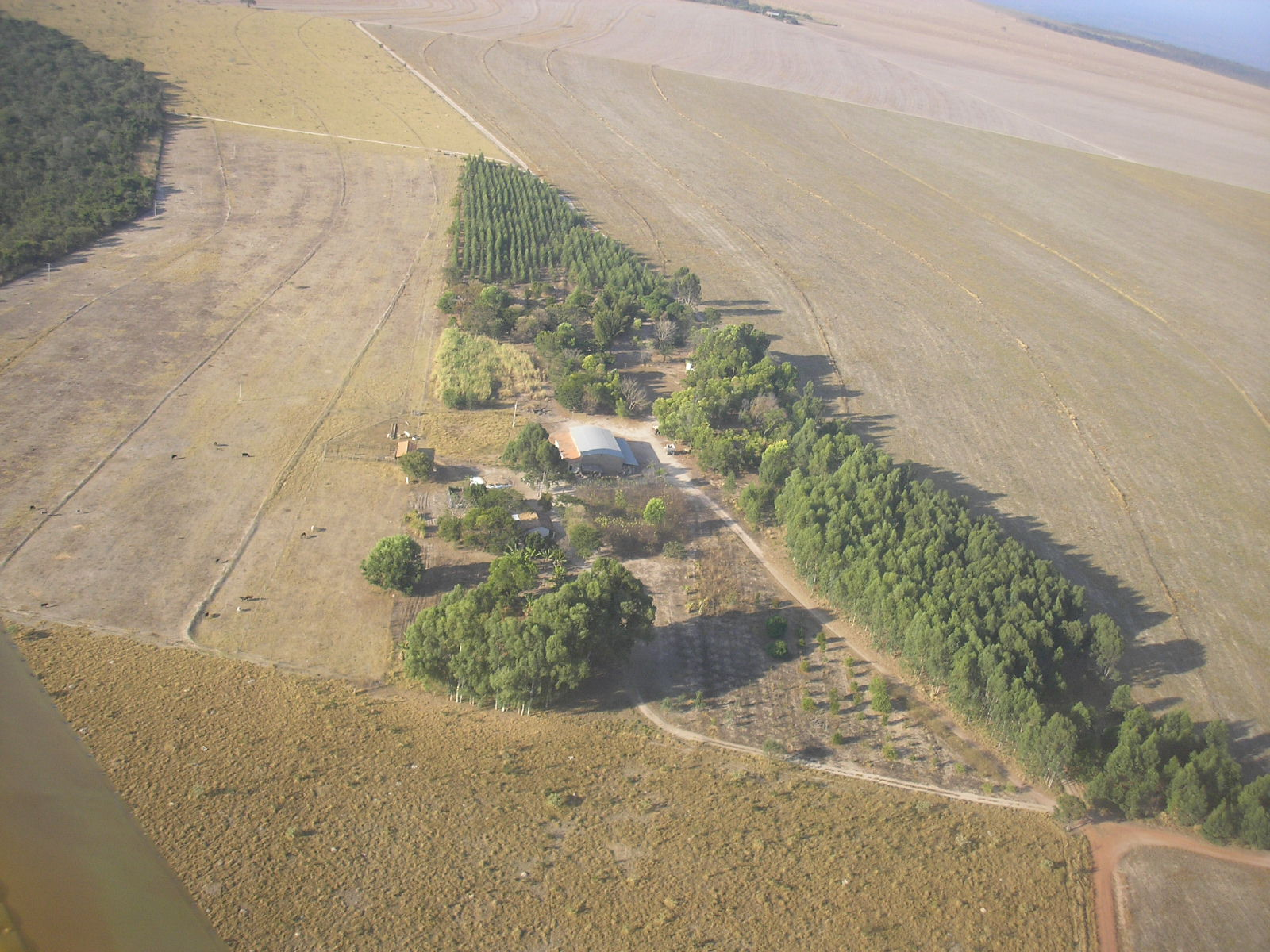
Fazenda Poloca in Uruana de Minas

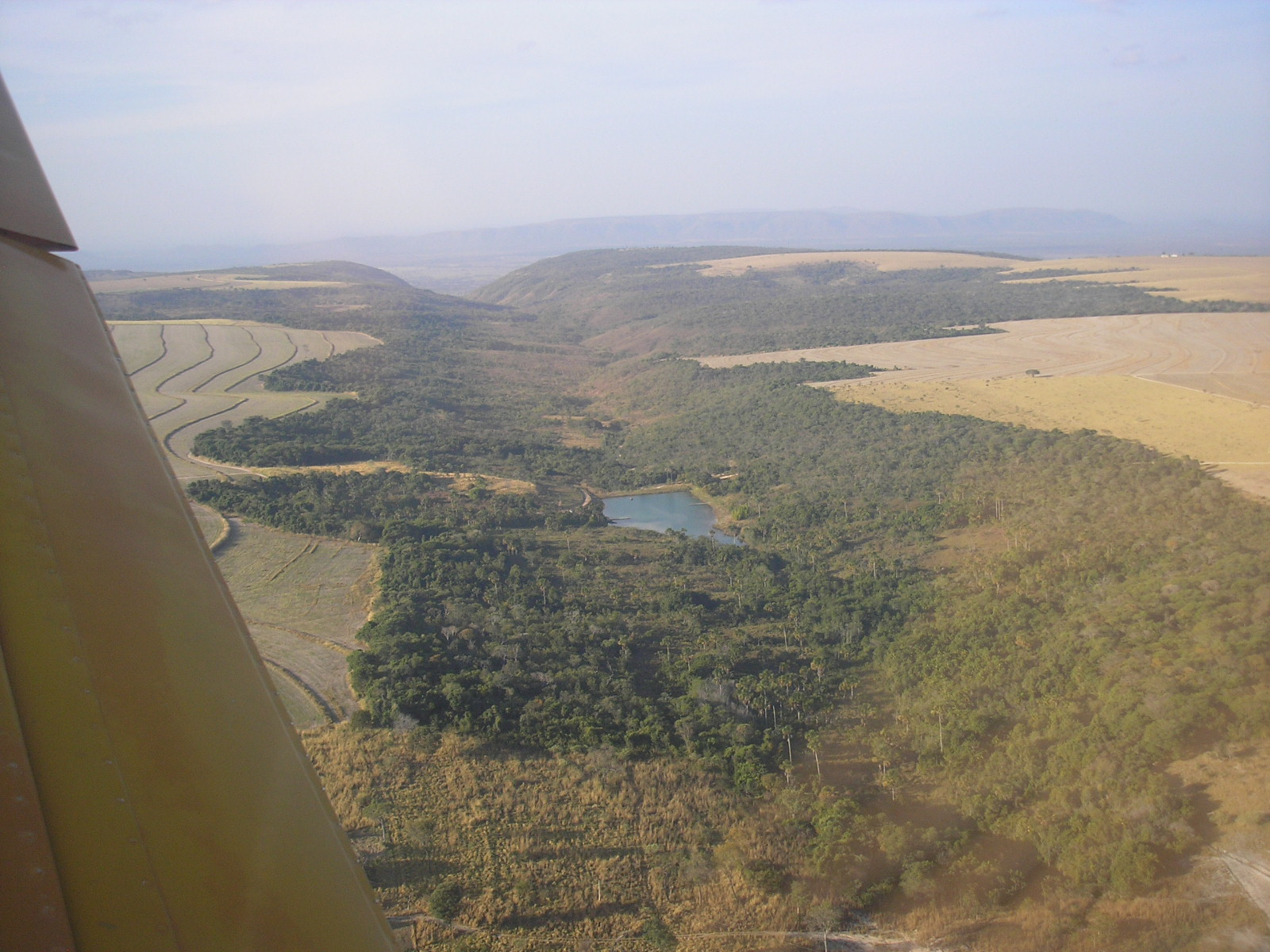
View of a reservoir in Uruana de Minas

Uruana de Minas is a municipality in the north of the Brazilian state of Minas Gerais. As of 2020 the population was 3,260 inhabitants in a total area of 589 km^{2}.

The elevation of the municipal seat is 530 m above sea level. The town became a municipality in 1997.

== Neighboring municipalities ==
- North: Buritis and Arinos
- West: Unaí
- South: Bonfinópolis de Minas
- East: Arinos

The nearest regional center is Unaí, which is connected by dirt and paved highways. The distance is 77 km.

== Economy ==
The main economic activities are cattle raising (16,427 in 2006) and agriculture. The main crops are cotton (1,000 ha.), peanuts (289 ha.), beans (2,010 ha.), corn (1,800 ha.), soybeans (4,100 ha.), and sorghum (400 ha.). In 2006 there were 277 farms with an area of 44,152 ha. The planted area was 6,000 ha., while the rest was natural pasture or woodland. About 800 people were employed in agriculture.

In the town itself the main employers were commerce and public administration. There were no financial institutions in 2007. There were 109 automobiles.

== Education and health ==
In the school system there were 794 students in 2 primary schools (2006), while there were 247 students in one middle school. There were no hospitals and residents had to go to Unaí, 77 km. away on bad roads. There were 3 public health clinics.

== Municipal Human Development Index ==
- MHDI: .712
- Ranking in the state: 492 out of 853 municipalities in 2000
- Ranking in the country: 2775 out of 5,138 municipalities in 2000
- Life expectancy: 69 years
- Literacy rate: 80%

== See also ==
- List of municipalities in Minas Gerais
