= Eliel (footballer, born 2003) =

Brazilian footballer

Personal information
- Full name: Eliel Chrystian Pereira Silva
- Date of birth: 26 January 2003 (age 23)
- Place of birth: Brasilândia de Minas, Brazil
- Height: 1.75 m (5 ft 9 in)
- Position: Forward

Team information
- Current team: Cuiabá
- Number: 11

Youth career
- Rubro Negro
- 2018–2022: Ponte Preta

Senior career*
Years	Team	Apps	(Gls)
2022–2023	Ponte Preta	51	(8)
2024–	Cuiabá	64	(6)
2025	→ Paysandu (loan)	6	(0)
2025	→ Londrina (loan)	14	(2)
- * Club domestic league appearances and goals as of 18 November 2026

Eliel Chrystian Pereira Silva (born 26 January 2003), simply known as Eliel, is a Brazilian footballer who plays as a forward for Cuiabá.

== Career ==
Born in Brasilândia de Minas, Minas Gerais, Eliel joined Ponte Preta's youth setup in 2018, from local side AE Rubro Negro. He made his first team debut on 20 July 2022; after coming on as a substitute for Da Silva, he scored the winner in a 1–0 Série B home win over Náutico.

On 26 August 2022, Eliel renewed his contract with Ponte until January 2025. After starting the 2023 season as a backup to Jeh, he became a starter under head coach Pintado.

== Career statistics ==
As of 14 November 2023

Club	Season	League			State League		Cup		Continental		Other		Total	
Club	Season	Division	Apps	Goals	Apps	Goals	Apps	Goals	Apps	Goals	Apps	Goals	Apps	Goals
Ponte Preta	2022	Série B	4	1	—		—		—		—		4	1
Ponte Preta	2023	Série B	31	4	14	3	2	0	—		—		46	7
Ponte Preta	Total		35	5	14	3	2	0	—		—		51	8
Cuiabá	2024	Série A	0	0	5	2	0	0	—		—		5	2
Career total			35	5	19	5	2	0	0	0	0	0	56	10

== Honours ==
Ponte Preta

- Campeonato Paulista Série A2: 2023
