= Grotto of the Gentio =

Archaeological site in Brazil

Cave of Gentio
- Gruta do Gentio (Portuguese)
- Grotto of the Gentio
- Location: Brazil

Cave of Gentio is a parietal art-bearing archaeological site situated about 30 km from Unaí, Minas Gerais, 180 km away from the Federal District.

Its importance was verified by UFMG archaeologists who began their exploration in the 1970s. In one of the stages of the excavations, the body of a naturally mummified child was found, classified as the oldest ever found in Brazil.

The cave is located in a limestone massif. During the surveys conducted in this area (1973) some technical procedures were taken in order to reveal the evidence of different occupations, which has been confirmed by carbon-14 dating obtained for the older occupational layers, and also because the high degree of preservation of the archaeological material found there, which has the occurrence of pictographs and petroglyphs.

The oldest layers from the site, which yielded lithic, osteological and wooden artefacts associated with hunter-gatherers, is dated to around 8,125 BP. A later occupational layer ranged from approximately 3,490 to 340 BP. This later layer yielded wooden art artefacts associated with a ceramic-agriculturalist culture. 36 human coprolites were recovered from this layer. The coprolites yielded evidence of helminth eggs from hookworms and Trichuris trichiura. This layer also yielded evidence for the presence of peanuts, maize, squash and gourd. These domesticated plants were present at the site by around 1,900 BC.
