= Natalândia =

Municipality in Minas Gerais, Brazil

- Municipality
- Interactive map of Natalândia
- Country: Brazil
- State: Minas Gerais
- Region: Southeast
- Time zone: UTC−3 (BRT)

Coordinates: 16°33′50″S 46°27′39″W

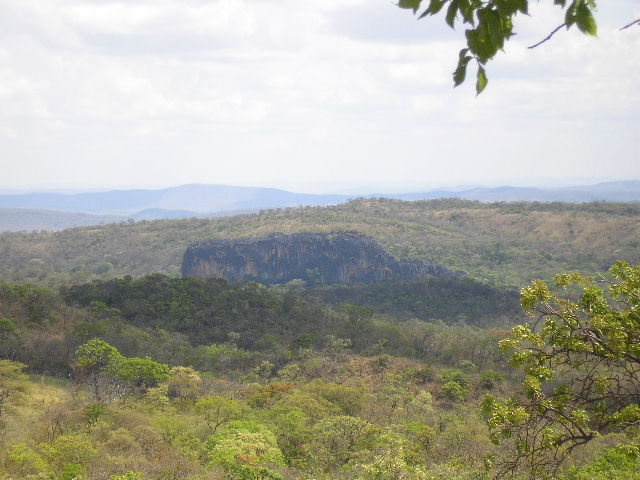
Chapada (hill) in Natalândia, Minas Gerais

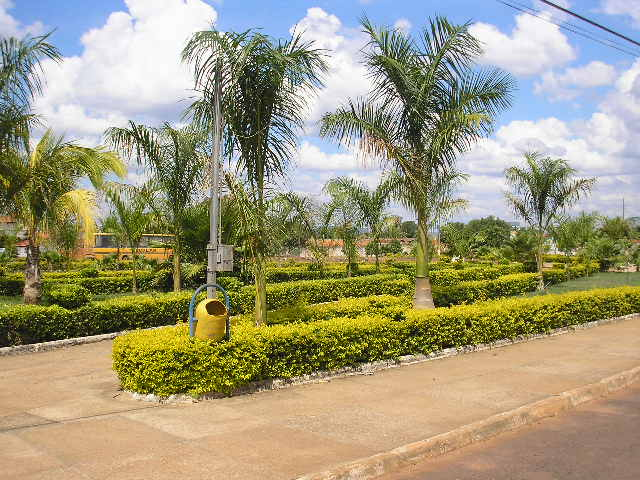
Main square in Natalândia

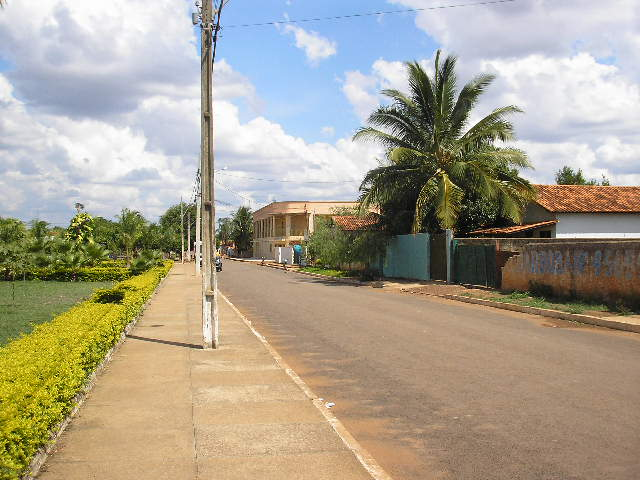
Main street in Natalândia

Natalância is a municipality in the north of the Brazilian state of Minas Gerais. As of 2020, the estimated population was 3,308 in a total area of 471 km^{2}.

Natalândia lies at an elevation of 550 m above sea level. It was created as a municipality in 1997. Neighboring municipalities are Unaí, Bonfinópolis de Minas, and Dom Bosco. Highway communications are precarious. Highway connections (not paved as of 2005) are made by dirt road for 47 kilometers to the junction with MG-202, which continues for 40 km as a paved road to Unaí.

The main economic activities are cattle raising (28,288 head in 2006) and the growing of perennial crops such as corn (840 ha.), and very modest production of manioc, beans, and rice. There is no data on permanent crops such as citrus fruits, bananas, or coffee, although these would be very modest if they occur at all. In 2006 there were 260 farms with a total planted area of 1,600 ha. There were only 41 tractors. 850 people were employed on the farms, including the producer's family. In all the municipality there were 108 automobiles in 2007.

In the school system there were 735 students in 3 primary schools and 157 students in 1 middle school. Health care was provided by 1 public health clinic. The nearest hospital was in Unaí, more than 80 km. away on dirt roads.

Municipal Human Development Index

- Life expectancy: 68.0
- Literacy rate: .81
- Per capita income R$173.5
- HDI: .722
- Ranking in the state: 454 out of 853 municipalities in 2000
- Ranking in the country: 2588 out of 5,138 municipalities in 2000

== See also ==
- List of municipalities in Minas Gerais
