= Unaí =

- Municipality
- Município de Unaí; Municipality of Unaí
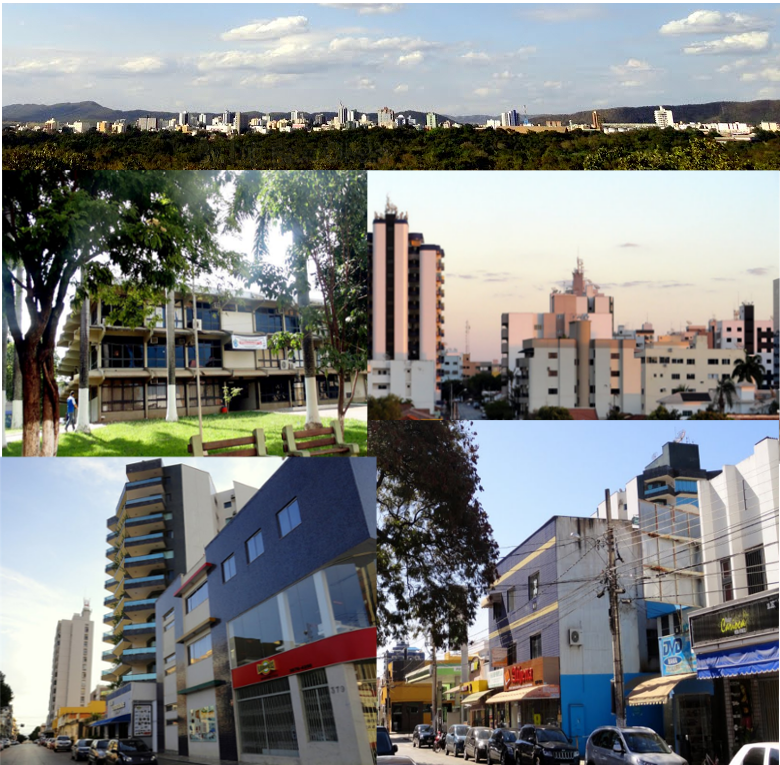

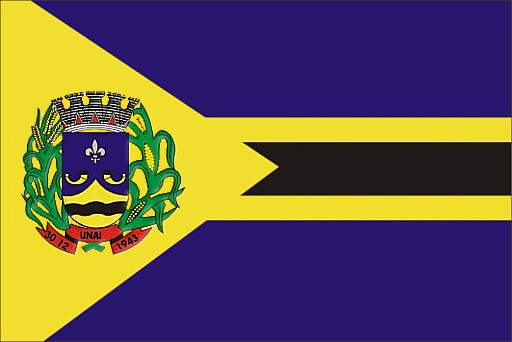
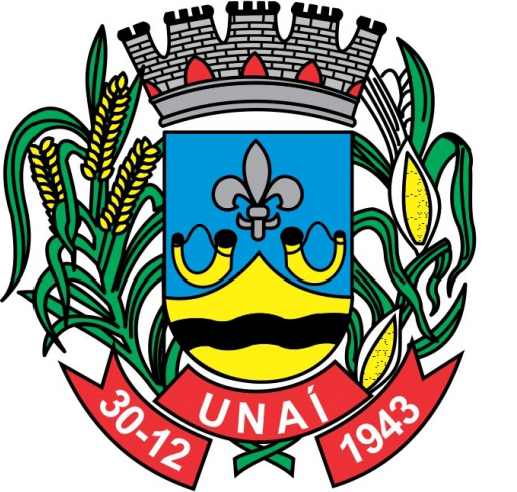
- Flag Coat of arms

- Localization of Unaí in Minas Gerais

- Localization of Unaí in Brazil
- Coordinates: 16°21′50″S 46°54′15″W
- Country: Brazil
- Region: Southeast
- State: Minas Gerais
- Founded: December 30, 1943

Government
  - Mayor: Thiago Martins (PL) (2024-2028)

Area
  - Total: 10,727 km^{2} (4,142 sq mi)
- Elevation: 575 m (1,886 ft)

Population (2020)
  - Total: 84,930
  - Density: 7.92/km^{2} (20.5/sq mi)
- Demonym: Unaiense
- Time zone: UTC−3 (BRT)
- Postal code: 38610-000
- Area code: +55 38
- Website: www.prefeituraunai.mg.gov.br

Unaí is a municipality in the Northern Region of Minas Gerais, in the Brazilian state of Minas Gerais, in the Southeast Region of Brazil. It is located 590 km from the capital of Minas Gerais and 164 km from the federal capital. Unaí is the main municipality of its micro-region of the same name and, together with Paracatu, the most important city of the said mesoregion of Minas Gerais. Due to its geopolitical location, because it is geographically and politically linked to Brasilia and politically to Belo Horizonte, the municipality has a strong economic dynamism for a municipality that still carries the typically mineiro custom.

Its population is of 84,930 inhabitants according to estimates of the census of the IBGE of 2020 and is one of the less populous municipalities of the state but with one of the greater commuting migrations daily of the region.

== History ==
In the municipality of Unai, there is the archaeological site Cave Gentile II, which records traces of hunter-gatherer peoples of more than 10,000 years, and gardeners people of almost 4000 years, they grew, according abundant plant remains: Corn, peanuts, pumpkin and gourd. In the city, it has the record of the oldest Brazilian ceramics outside the Amazon, dated 3500 years.

At the time of arrival of the first Europeans to Brazil, the central portion of Brazil was occupied by indigenous Macro-Ge linguistic trunk, as acroás, the xacriabás, the Xavante, the Kayapo, the Javaés, among others povos.

Over the centuries XVI, XVII and XVIII, numerous expeditions composed of Portuguese descent (called Scouts) swept the region in search of gold, precious stones and hand indigenous slave labor.

In the nineteenth century, the farmer Domingos Pinto Brochado settled, along with their families, in an area near the Rio Preto called White Grass. In 1873, the village was elevated to the rank of belonging to Paracatu district, with Rio Preto name. In 1923, the district was renamed to Unai, which is a translation for the Tupi language, the ancient name of the district, Rio Preto. In 1943, Unai emancipated the city of Paracatu.

On January 28, 2004, three labor inspectors and the driver who led them were murdered in a rural area of the municipality during an inspection on farms in the region, a crime that became known nationally as the Slaughter of Unai

== Geography ==
Situated in the middle region of the Northwest of Minas Gerais and in the micro region of Unai, has an area of 8492 km square, representing 1.443 percent of the state, 0.9155 percent of the Southeast region of Brazil and 0.0996 percent of all Brazilian territory. Its estimated population in 2013 was 81,693 inhabitants.

Among the main geographical features are the following:

- Cave of Tamboril with approximately 1178 meters of development;
- Cave of Gentio;
- Lapa do Sapezal or Cave of the Moeda;
- Waterfall of Jiboia (140 meters free fall);
- Waterfall of Queimado;
- Waterfall do Rio Preto (two kilometers from the city center);
- Cave of Quilombo (the name originated in the nineteenth century, when blacks unhappy with the harsh working conditions in Paracatu gold mine took refuge in the cave);
- Stone of Canto (Pedra do Canto);
- Serra Geral do Rio Preto (Mountain);
- Serra of Pico (Mountain);
- Serra do Jataí (Mountain);
- Stone of Canto- It is located in Pedra Farm. Has Napoleon's hat shape.
- Serra Geral do Rio Preto - Splitter micro basins of the Black and Urucuia rivers.
- The Pico Mountain and Sierra Jataí - Elongated and parallel, separate strands of Ribeirao Roncador and Canabrava. In addition to the Gentio II Cave, there are the Gentio I Caves, Cave of monkfish and the Grotto Sapezal or Lapa Money, about 80 meters diâmetrocom various formations of stalactites and stalagmites, as well as a lake of blue water. Dista forty kilometers from the city of Unai and is located inside a mountain on private land.

Great emphasis can be given to the Waterfall Jiboia, which is located about fifty miles Unai. The waterfall is formed by the Ribeirão Jiboia and has approximately 140 meters of free fall. Unai resists droughts that occur every year, thanks to the river Rio Preto containing a vast forest reserve around.

=== Climate ===
The lowest temperature recorded in Unaí occurred on June 9, 1981, with a minimum of 5.1 °C (41.2 °F). On the other hand, the absolute maximum is 42.6 °C (108.7 °F) on six occasions, two in October 2020, on the 8th and 9th, and the others in 2023, on the 26th of September and the 14th, 15th and 17 November.

Climate data for Unaí (1991–2020)
Month	Jan	Feb	Mar	Apr	May	Jun	Jul	Aug	Sep	Oct	Nov	Dec	Year
Mean daily maximum °C (°F)	31.8 (89.2)	32.1 (89.8)	31.7 (89.1)	31.5 (88.7)	30.4 (86.7)	29.9 (85.8)	30.1 (86.2)	31.9 (89.4)	34.2 (93.6)	34.4 (93.9)	31.7 (89.1)	31.5 (88.7)	31.8 (89.2)
Daily mean °C (°F)	25.6 (78.1)	25.7 (78.3)	25.4 (77.7)	25.0 (77.0)	23.2 (73.8)	21.8 (71.2)	21.7 (71.1)	23.6 (74.5)	26.3 (79.3)	27.1 (80.8)	25.4 (77.7)	25.4 (77.7)	24.7 (76.5)
Mean daily minimum °C (°F)	20.7 (69.3)	20.6 (69.1)	20.6 (69.1)	19.5 (67.1)	16.9 (62.4)	14.4 (57.9)	13.8 (56.8)	15.1 (59.2)	18.4 (65.1)	20.6 (69.1)	20.6 (69.1)	20.7 (69.3)	18.5 (65.3)
Average precipitation mm (inches)	204.1 (8.04)	178.2 (7.02)	204.6 (8.06)	87.4 (3.44)	19.9 (0.78)	6.4 (0.25)	0.7 (0.03)	7.8 (0.31)	25.7 (1.01)	93.7 (3.69)	247.5 (9.74)	241.0 (9.49)	1,317 (51.9)
Average precipitation days (≥ 1.0 mm)	14	11	12	6	2	0	0	1	3	7	14	16	86
Average relative humidity (%)	71.8	70.9	73.1	69.4	66.3	61.3	54.7	47.2	46.6	54.8	70.6	73.2	63.3
Mean monthly sunshine hours	177.7	176.6	190.8	222.5	234.7	237.8	245.1	252.6	216.0	207.6	152.1	140.0	2,453.5
Source: Instituto Nacional de Meteorologia (sun 1981–1010)

=== Location ===
Unai is located southeast of the Federal District and is linked thereto by the BR-251 highway, which also connects with BR 040 at Paracatu. The Preto River, which flows out of Lagoa Feia near Formosa and joins the Paracatu River, passes by the city. Neighboring municipalities are: Buritis, Cabeceira Grande, Paracatu, Dom Bosco, Natalândia, Bonfinópolis de Minas, Uruana de Minas, Arinos, Brasilândia de Minas, and João Pinheiro.

Unaí is also the seat of a microregion (number 64) composed of 9 cities with an area of 27,653.10 km² and a population of 133,168 inhabitants. Cities making up the microregion of Unaí are Arinos, Bonfinópolis de Minas, Buritis, Cabeceira Grande, Dom Bosco, Formoso, Natalândia, Unaí, and Uruana de Minas.

== Economy ==
The region has experienced rapid development in recent years after the building of Brasília and the opening up of the cerrado soils to cultivation of soybeans and irrigated rice. There are large herds of cattle—305,000 head (35,000 milking cows)--and extensive plantations of corn, beans, soybeans, sorghum, and rice. The main agricultural products in planted area in 2006 were oranges, passion fruit, cotton, garlic, rice, beans, corn, soybeans, sorghum, and wheat. There were 8 banks: Banco do Brasil, Bradesco, Caixa Federal de Depósitos, HSBC, Itaú, Mercantil, Crediunai, and Crediparnor.

PLanted area of main crops in 2006

- Soybeans: 83,000 ha.
- Sorghum: 12,000 ha.
- Corn: 34,000 ha.
- Rice: 1,300 ha.
- Beans: 40,000 ha.
- Coffee: 1,635 ha.
- Bananas: 80 ha.
- Oranges: 116 ha.

Farm data for 2006

- Number of farms: 3,596
- Total area: 664,351 ha.
- Planted area: 170,000 ha.
- Area in natural pasture: 313,408 ha.
- Persons working in agriculture: 12,500

== Health and education ==
- Primary schools: 31
- Enrollment: 13,222 (2006)
- Middle and secondary schools: 9
- Enrollment: 4,084

There are six university education institutions in the city:

- Inesc (Private)
- Factu (Private)
- Facisa (Private)
- Unimontes (Public - Estadual)
- UNIP (Private)
- UFVJM - Universidade Federal dos Vales do Jequitinhonha e Mucuri (Public - Federal)
- Health clinics: 19 (2005)
- Hospitals: 4 with 208 beds (43 beds in public hospitals)

Municipal Human Development Index

- MHDI: .812
- Ranking in the state: 21 out of 853 municipalities in 2000
- Ranking in the country: 343 out of 5,138 municipalities in 2000
- Literacy rate: 87%
- Life expectancy: 74.7

== Culture ==
The city is rich in theater groups and libraries, including the municipal library of the city, which has one of the greatest literary achievements of the State of Minas Gerais. There is a museum and also a cinema in the city.

Theaters:

- Coletivo Trambique
- Grupo Anônimo de Teatro Universitário (Extinto)
- CIA de Teatro Pé na Estrada
- Grupo Asas do Vento (Extinto)
- Os Casuais (Extinto)
- Grupo Teatral Fênix
- CIA Cínica de Teatro (Extinto)
- Grupo Teatral Ador'arte
- Grupo Teatral Shalon
- Grupo Teatral Kirios
- Grupo Ob-Cervantes (Extinto)
- Grupo T.I.L - Teatro Interiorano Livre (Extinto)
- Grupo Teatral Filhos de Deus

Libraries:

- Biblioteca Pio XII
- Biblioteca Humberto de Alencar Castelo Branco (Municipal)
- Biblioteca Juscelino Kubitschek
- Biblioteca Comunitária

== See also ==
- List of municipalities in Minas Gerais
