= Grande Sertão Veredas National Park =

Brazilian park

- Parque Nacional Grande Sertão Veredas
- IUCN category II (national park)
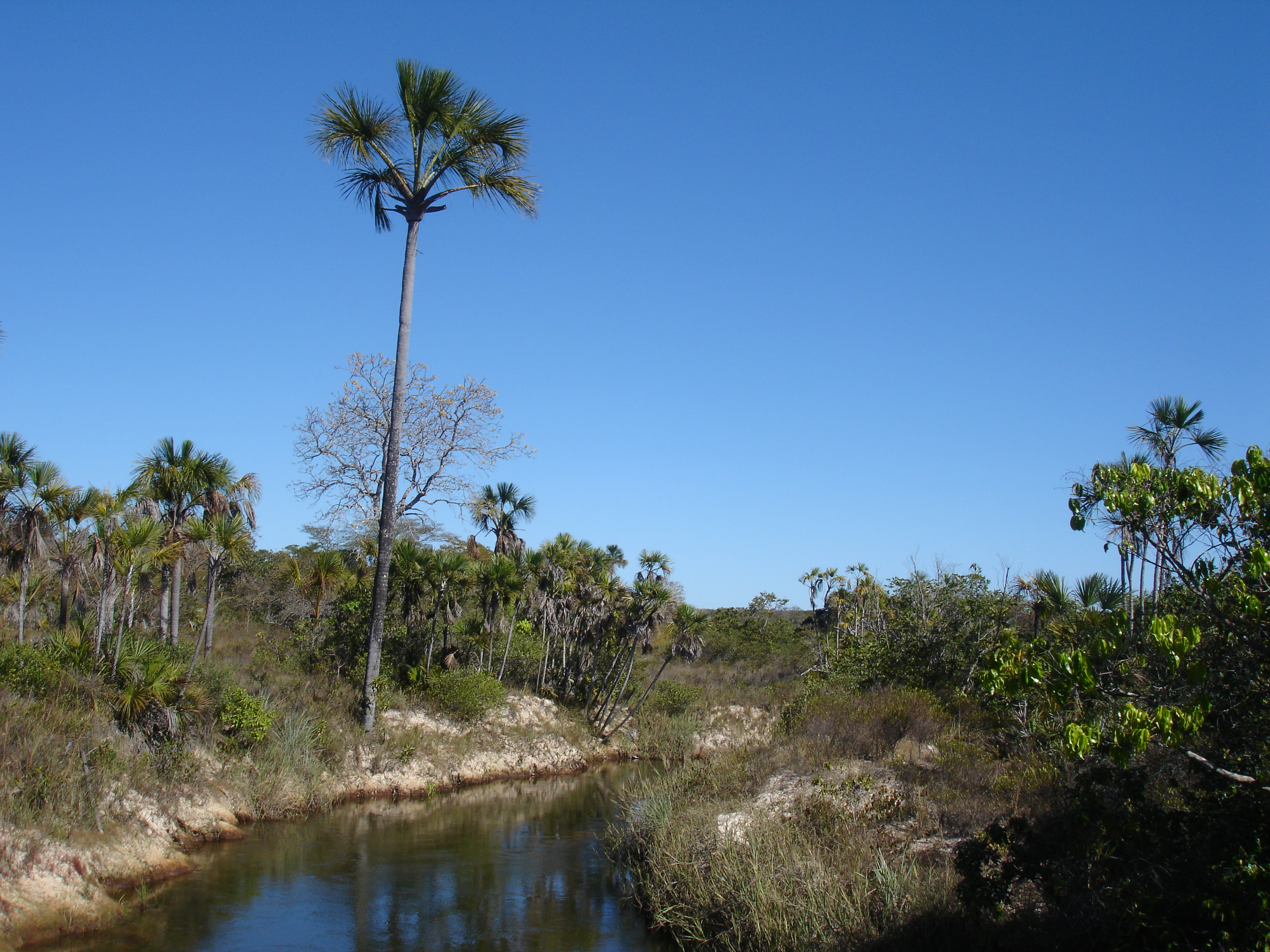
- A stream ("vereda") in the park

- Location within Brazil
- Location: Between Minas Gerais and Bahia, Brazil
- Coordinates: 15.107°S 45.776°W
- Area: 2,316 km^{2} (894 sq mi)
- Designation: National park
- Created: 12 April 1989
- Governing body: IBAMA
- Administrator: ICMBio

The Grande Sertão Veredas National Park (Portuguese: Parque Nacional Grande Sertão Veredas) is a national park located on the border between the states of Minas Gerais and Bahia, Brazil.

== Location ==
The park is in the Cerrado biome. It covers an area of 230,853 hectares (570,450 acres) and is administered by the Chico Mendes Institute for Biodiversity Conservation. It was created by decree nº 97.658 of 12 April 1989, revised on 21 May 2004. It is in the municipality of Formoso, Minas Gerais. Altitude ranges from 660 to 900 metres (2,170 to 2,950 ft). Annual rainfall averages 1,400 millimetres (55 in). Temperature ranges from 16 to 37 °C (61 to 99 °F) with average 23 °C (73 °F).

The park contains forests, savannah, cerrado and dense cerrado. There are extensive streams (veredas) which can form oxbow lakes or larger rivers. The terrain contains extensive sandstone plateaus covered in savannah vegetation with lower drainage areas holding the streams. The park contains much of the upper basin of the Carinhanha River and of the sub-basins of its tributaries such as the Itaguari, Mato Grande, Preto and Canabrava.

== Conservation ==
The park is classed as IUCN protected area category II (national park). As a national park it has the basic objectives of preserving natural ecosystems of great ecological relevance and scenic beauty, enabling scientific research, environmental education, outdoor recreation and eco-tourism. Specifically the park aims to preserve the basin of the Carinhanha River, an important tributary of the São Francisco River, to preserve the streams and landscape described in the novel The Devil to Pay in the Backlands (in Portuguese Grande Sertão: Veredas) by João Guimarães Rosa, and also to preserve the flora and endemic fauna of the Cerrado.

Protected species in the park include the maned wolf (Chrysocyon brachyurus), jaguar (Panthera onca), cougar (Puma concolor), ocelot (Leopardus pardalis), colocolo (Leopardus colocolo), Brazilian merganser (Mergus octosetaceus), marsh deer (Blastocerus dichotomus), giant anteater (Myrmecophaga tridactyla), giant armadillo (Priodontes maximus), Brazilian three-banded armadillo (Tolypeutes tricinctus) and Owl's spiny rat (Carterodon sulcidens),.

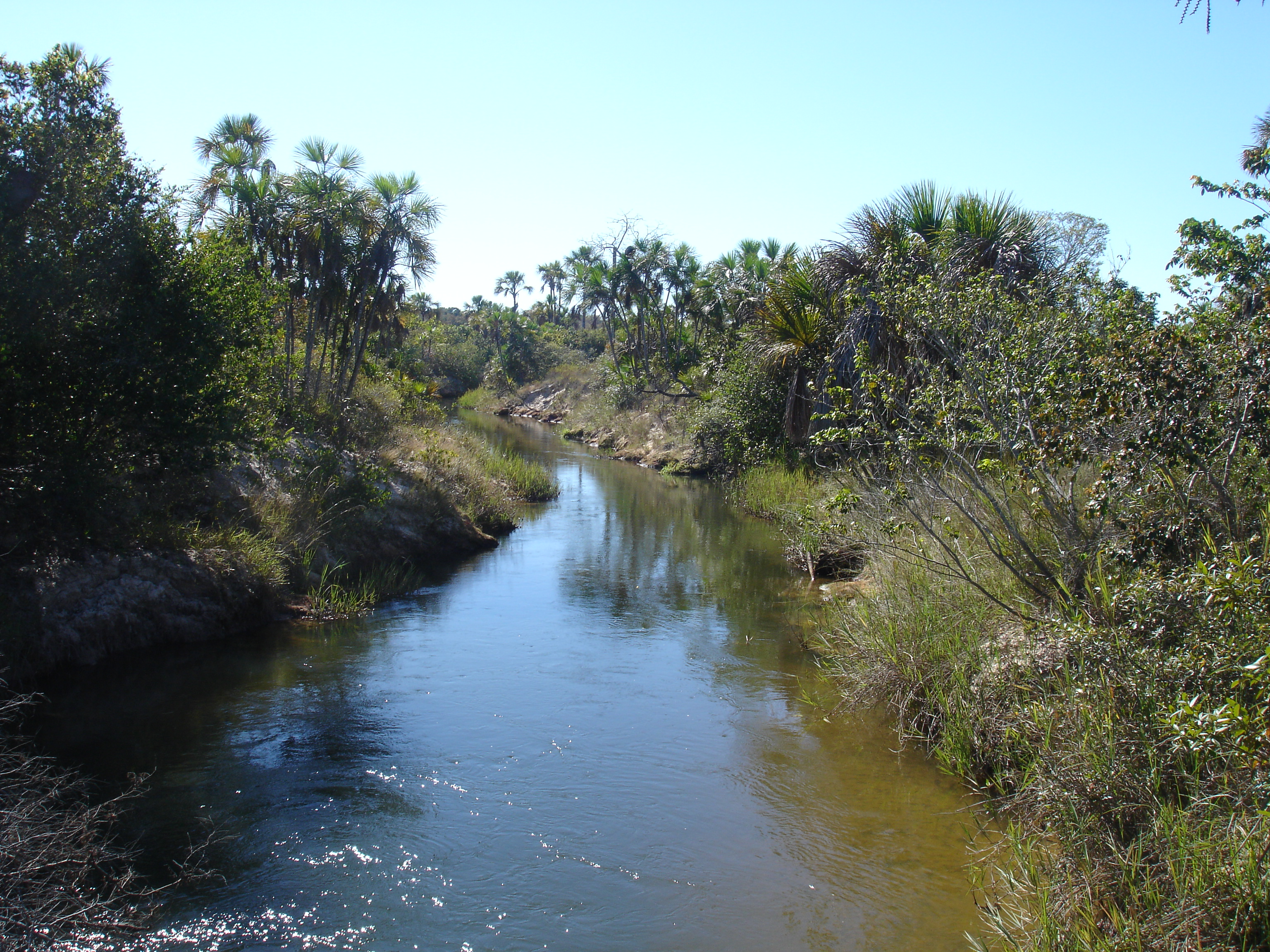

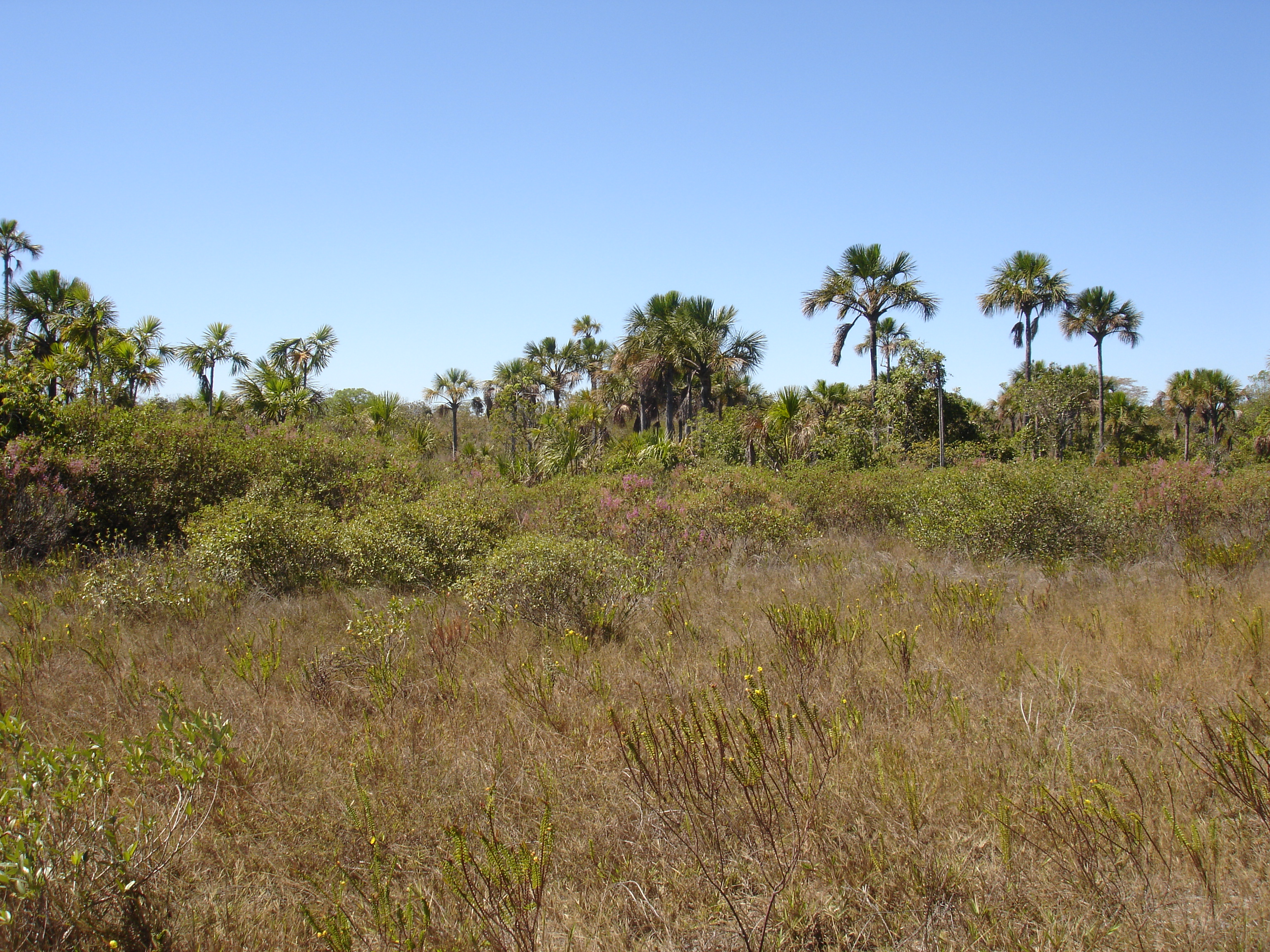

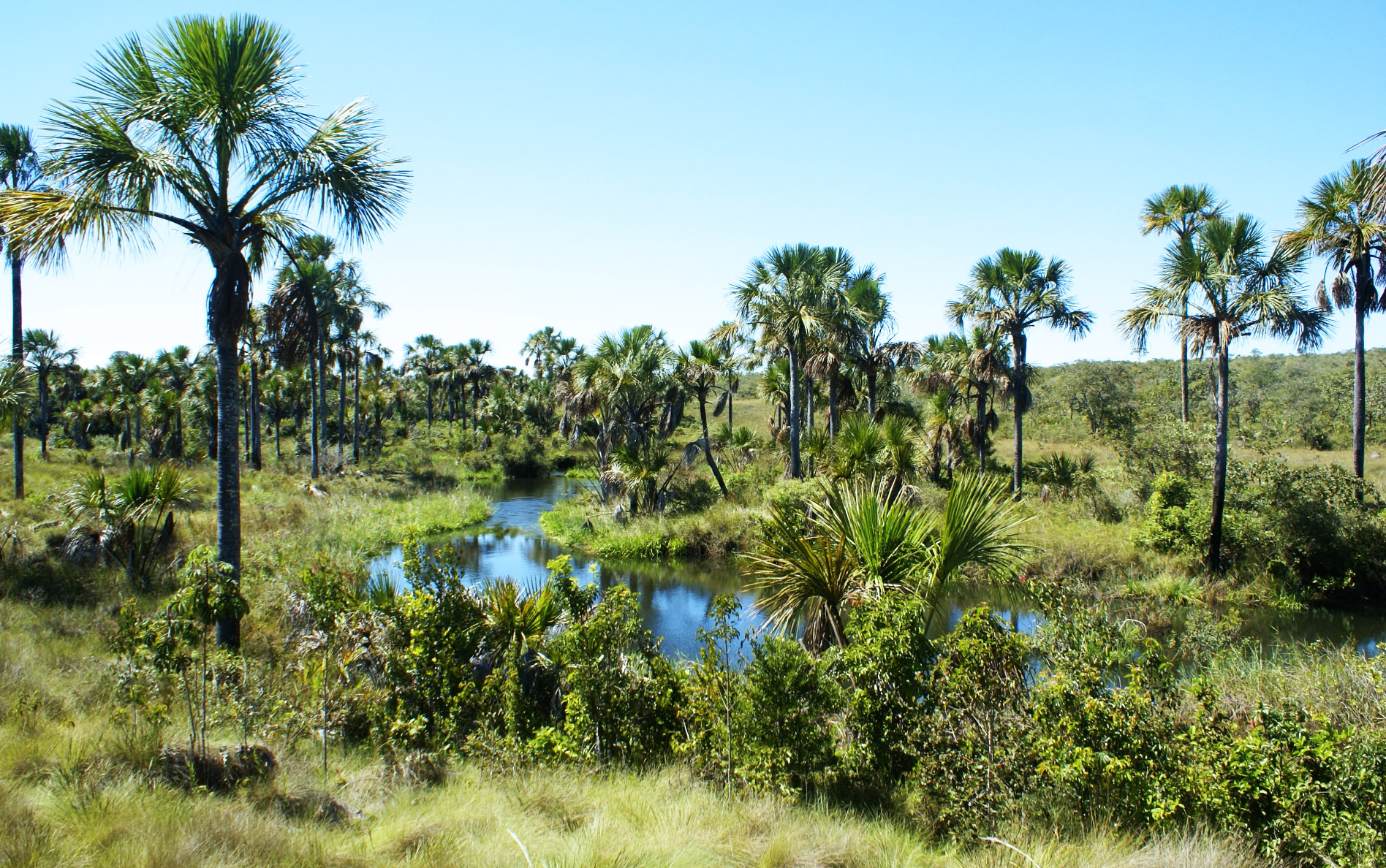

== Sources ==
- Parque Nacional Grande Sertão Veredas (in Portuguese), Chico Mendes Institute for Biodiversity Conservation, archived from the original on 2016-03-03
- Unidade de Conservação: Parque Nacional Grande Sertão Veredas (in Portuguese), MMA: Ministério do Meio Ambiente
