= Urucuia =

Human settlement in Brazil

Coordinates: 16°07′51″S 45°44′33″W

- Municipality
- Flag Coat of arms
- Interactive map of Urucuia
- Country: Brazil
- State: Minas Gerais
- Region: Southeast
- Time zone: UTC−3 (BRT)

Location of Urucuia in the state of Minas Gerais

Urucuia is a municipality in the north of the state of Minas Gerais in Brazil. As of 2020 the population was 17,173 in an area of 2,072 km^{2} (800 sq mi). The elevation of the municipal seat is 498 meters. It became a municipality in 1993. The postal code (CEP) is 39315-000 and it belongs to the statistical microregion of Januária

Urucuia is located in an isolated region between the São Francisco River and the Distrito Federal It is connected by dirt road to Arinos and to São Romãoon the São Francisco River. It lies on the left bank of the Urucuia Rivers, a tributary of the São Francisco.

The economy is based on agriculture with emphasis on cattle raising. There were 35,000 head in 2006. The main agricultural crops were coffee, coconuts, manioc, and corn. The GDP was R$39,297,000 in 2005. In 2006 there were 4,300 people connected to agriculture among whom were 700 salaried workers. There were no banking agencies.

This municipality is extremely isolated from major population centers and suffers from drought and poor soils. It is one of the poorest in the state and in the country. Like many impoverished districts it fought for municipal autonomy to apply for government assistance programs.

- Municipal Human Development Index: .675 (2000)
- State ranking: 653 out of 853 municipalities as of 2000
- National ranking: 3,372 out of 5,138 municipalities as of 2000
- Health clinics and hospitals: 1 basic clinics, 2 health centers, and 1 hospital with 36 beds
- Life expectancy: 69.2 (2004)

The social and health indicators were: degree of urbanization—44.9%; Literacy rate: 77.6; coverage of sewage system in the urban area—0.10%; coverage of garbage collection in the urban area—67.9; and infant mortality—18.60.

== See also ==
- List of municipalities in Minas Gerais
