= Arinos =

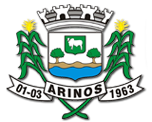
- Coat of arms

- Location of Arinos in the state of Minas Gerais
- Coordinates: 15°54′43″S 46°05′47″W
- Country: Brazil
- State: Minas Gerais
- IBGE microregion: Unaí
- Established: 1962

Government
  - Mayor: Carlos Alberto Rech Filho (2005-2009)

Area
  - Total: 5,339 km^{2} (2,061 sq mi)
- Elevation: 509 m (1,670 ft)

Population (2020)
  - Total: 17,862
  - Density: 3.346/km^{2} (8.665/sq mi)
- Time zone: UTC−3 (BRT)
- Postcode (CEP): 38680-000
- Website: arinos.mg.gov.br

Arinos is a municipality in northern Minas Gerais state in Brazil. Arinos is located east of the Federal District on the Urucuia River, a major tributary of the São Francisco. The city is 333 km from Brasília.

The municipality belongs to the statistical microregion of Unaí Microregion, which has 9 municipalities. Neighboring municipalities are:

- North: Formosa
- West: Buritis and Unaí
- East: Urucuia and Chapada Gaúcha

Arinos has poor highway connections leading east to the Sao Francisco river and to the state capital of Belo Horizonte, but a better road leading west to the national capital of Brasília. Few of the roads in the town are paved. There is a fully paved road (BR-479) leading west to Cabeceiras to join the important BR-020, 22 kilometers east of Formosa. The distance is approximately 165 kilometers. Another paved road leads west, then southwest to Garapuava, and continues southwest to the important regional center of Unaí.

== Economy ==
The economy is based on cattle raising and agriculture, especially the cultivation of soybeans, sorghum, and corn.

- Industrial establishments: 14 (2005)
- Commercial retail establishments: 245 (commerce, vehicle repair, personal and domestic objects)
- Restaurant and hotel establishments: 14
- Financial institutions: 1 (2005)
- Motor vehicles: 908 automobiles and 103 pickup trucks (2007)

Main agricultural crops in 2006)

- Rice: 2,050 ha.
- Corn: 3,500 ha.
- Soybeans: 4,00 ha.
- Sorghum: 200 ha.
- Beans: 900 ha.

Livestock raising in 2006

- Cattle: 92,509 head

Farm data in 2006

- Number of farms: 1,674
- Total area: 303,791
- Planted area: 27,500 ha.
- Area of natural pasture: 161,587
- Salaried workers in agriculture: 375
- Workers related to producer: 4,722

== Health and education ==
- Health clinics: 8 (2 private and 6 public)
- Hospitals: 1 public with 31 beds
- Number of primary schools: 18
- Primary school enrollment: 3,817
- Number of middle and secondary schools: 5
- Middle and secondary school enrollment: 996
- Municipal Human Development Index: 0.711 Frigoletto

Part of the municipality of Arinos is inside the Grande Sertão Veredas National Park, which lies to the north on an unpaved highway between Arinos and Formosa.

== Climate ==
Climate data for Arinos (1991–2020)
Month	Jan	Feb	Mar	Apr	May	Jun	Jul	Aug	Sep	Oct	Nov	Dec	Year
Mean daily maximum °C (°F)	32.4 (90.3)	32.8 (91.0)	32.4 (90.3)	32.2 (90.0)	31.1 (88.0)	30.5 (86.9)	30.7 (87.3)	32.5 (90.5)	34.7 (94.5)	35.0 (95.0)	32.4 (90.3)	32.0 (89.6)	32.4 (90.3)
Daily mean °C (°F)	26.0 (78.8)	26.2 (79.2)	25.8 (78.4)	25.4 (77.7)	23.6 (74.5)	22.2 (72.0)	22.1 (71.8)	23.8 (74.8)	26.4 (79.5)	27.5 (81.5)	25.9 (78.6)	25.7 (78.3)	25.1 (77.2)
Mean daily minimum °C (°F)	21.2 (70.2)	21.3 (70.3)	21.3 (70.3)	20.4 (68.7)	17.8 (64.0)	15.6 (60.1)	15.0 (59.0)	16.2 (61.2)	19.2 (66.6)	21.2 (70.2)	21.3 (70.3)	21.2 (70.2)	19.3 (66.7)
Average precipitation mm (inches)	186.6 (7.35)	142.3 (5.60)	170.6 (6.72)	65.8 (2.59)	15.1 (0.59)	2.9 (0.11)	5.1 (0.20)	10.5 (0.41)	16.5 (0.65)	69.5 (2.74)	215.0 (8.46)	280.7 (11.05)	1,180.6 (46.48)
Average precipitation days (≥ 1.0 mm)	12	9	11	5	2	0	0	1	2	6	13	15	76
Average relative humidity (%)	70.5	69.5	72.6	68.9	66.0	62.1	55.6	48.3	45.0	52.1	69.0	73.0	62.7
Mean monthly sunshine hours	194.0	188.0	206.1	234.3	235.0	230.6	260.7	271.6	234.3	227.0	162.3	150.1	2,594
Source: Instituto Nacional de Meteorologia (precipitation and sun 1981–2010)
