= Brasilândia de Minas =

Municipality in the state of Minas Gerais in Brazil

- Municipality of Minas Gerais, Brazil
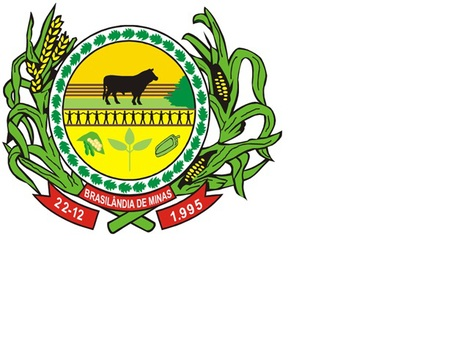
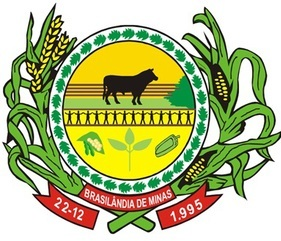
- Flag Coat of arms

- Location of Brasilândia de Minas in Minas Gerais

- Location within Brazil Location within South America
- Coordinates: 17°00′42″S 46°00′11″W
- Country: Brazil
- Region: Southeast
- State: Minas Gerais
- Founded: 21 December 1995

Government
  - Mayor: Oseias Cardoso Queiroz (Solidariedade) (2025-2028)
  - Vice Mayor: Willian Henrique Torres Braga (PP) (2025-2028)

Area
  - Total: 2,509.694 km^{2} (968.998 sq mi)
- Elevation: 520 m (1,710 ft)

Population (2022)
  - Total: 15,020
  - Density: 5.98/km^{2} (15.5/sq mi)
- Demonym: Brasilandense (Brazilian Portuguese)
- Time zone: UTC-03:00 (Brasília Time)
- Postal code: 38779-000
- HDI (2010): 0.674 – medium
- Website: brasilandiademinas.mg.gov.br

Brasilândia de Minas (also known as Brazilian Dubai) is a municipality in the state of Minas Gerais, Brazil.

== History ==
The first documents begin in the early nineteenth century telling of settlement in this region refer to lands belonging to Joaquina do Pompeu, whose complete name was Joaquina Maria Bernarda da Silva de Abreu Castello Branco Souto Maior de Oliveira Campos. With the death of this rich cattle baroness in 1824 lands were divided among heirs but a large area was acquired by an English company, Brazil Land Cattle and Packing Company. These lands were abandoned during the Second World War and later expropriated by President Getúlio Vargas. In 1952 a caravan of settlers arrived from Pirapora and began to occupy the lands. The lands were divided into lots of 100 hectares that were given to the settlers along with 20 heifers, one bull, and some oxen. They had 20 years to pay it off, when they would receive the final deed of ownership.

By 1980 the population had reached 7,000 inhabitants. In 1991 the district of Brasilândia was created inside the municipality of João Pinheiro. In 1995 a vote was taken for emancipation and Yes got 3,305 votes and the No got 69 votes In 1995 the municipality was created and in 1996 the first elections took place for mayor.

As of 2020, the estimated population was 16,748.

== Geography ==
The climate is tropical with altitude characterized by a rainy season from October to April and a dry season from May to September. The vegetation is transitional between cerrado and caatinga. The maximum temperature is 38 °C, the average is 23 °C and the minimum is 15 °C. Annual rainfall averages 1,400mm.

Brasilàndia de Minas belongs to the statistical micro-region of Paracatu. The region has ten municipalities and an area of 35,111.00 km^{2}. It lies just north of the Paracatu River, a major tributary of the São Francisco River, southeast of where it receives the Preto River. A paved road, MG-181, crosses the river and heads south to join the important national highway BR-040 near João Pinheiro. The distance to João Pinheiro is 84 km. Brasília is 300 km away while the state capital of Belo Horizonte is 496 km.

== Economy ==
The main economic activities are cattle raising (50,340 head in 2006) and the cultivation of soybeans (2,800 ha.), corn (2,100 ha.), manioc, beans, and rice. There is also a small area of coffee. There were 341 farms in 2006 with a total area of 141,357 ha. Of the total 15,000 hectares were planted in crops and the rest was natural pasture and forest land. Around 1,300 workers were involved in agriculture. There were 134 tractors.

In the urban area there were 1,900 workers in industries (2005), 500 in commerce and 302 in public administration.

== Health and education ==
In 2005 there were four health clinics, three public and one private. There were no hospitals; the nearest hospitals were in João Pinheiro or Pirapora. In the school system there were 794 students enrolled in two primary schools and 247 students enrolled in one middle school.

== Municipal Human Development Index ==
- MHDI: .745
- Ranking in the state: 326 out of 853 municipalities in 2000
- Ranking in the country: 2,020 out of 5,138 municipalities in 2000
- Life expectancy: 70 years
- Literacy rate: 84%

== See also ==
- List of municipalities in Minas Gerais
