= Dom Bosco =

Municipality of Brazil

- Municipality
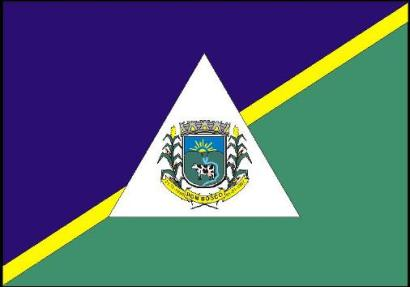
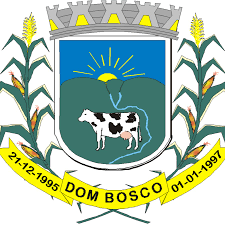
- Flag Coat of arms
- Interactive map of Dom Bosco
- Country: Brazil
- State: Minas Gerais
- Region: Southeast
- Time zone: UTC−3 (BRT)

16°49′48″S 46°22′48″W

Dom Bosco is a Brazilian municipality in the north of the state of Minas Gerais. In 2020 the population was 3,655 in a total area of 822 km^{2}. The elevation of the municipal seat is 610 meters above sea level.

== Geography ==
Dom Bosco is located northeast of Paracatu and southeast of Unaí. Highway connections with Unaí are made by MG-188 and BR-251. The distance to Unaí is approximately 85 km.

== Economy ==
The main economic activities are cattle raising (34,000 head in 2006) and the growing of soybeans (450 ha.), corn (1,700 ha.), beans, and rice. There is also small production of coffee and mangoes. The main employers are public administration and agriculture. In 2006 there were 406 farms employing over 1,000 people. In 2007 there were 169 automobiles. There were no banks as of 2007.

== Education and health ==
In the school system there were 826 students enrolled in 4 primary schools and 224 students enrolled in 1 middle school (2006). In 2005 there were 2 public health clinics.

== See also ==
- List of municipalities in Minas Gerais
