= João Pinheiro, Minas Gerais =

João Pinheiro
- Municipality
- Município de João Pinheiro; Municipality of João Pinheiro
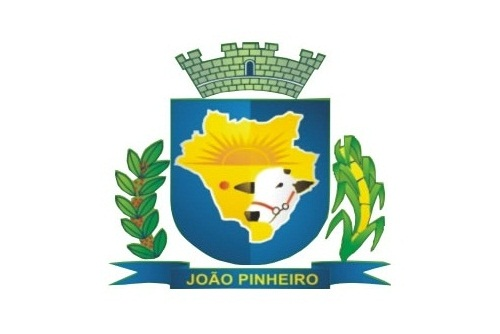
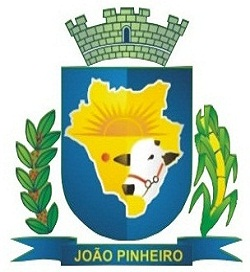
- Flag Coat of arms
- Nickname: Jomp's City
- Localization of João Pinheiro in Minas Gerais

- Localization of João Pinheiro in Brazil
- Coordinates: 17°44′39″S 46°10′26″W
- Country: Brazil
- Region: Southeast
- State: Minas Gerais
- Founded: August 30, 1911

Government
  - Mayor: Edmar Xavier Maciel (PDT) (2017-2020)

Area
  - Total: 10,727.460 km^{2} (4,141.895 sq mi)
- Elevation: 765 m (2,510 ft)

Population (2010)
  - Total: 45,260
  - Density: 4.22/km^{2} (10.9/sq mi)
- Demonym: Pinheirense
- Time zone: UTC−3 (BRT)
- Postal Code (CEP): 38770-000
- Area code: +55 38
- Website: www.joaopinheiro.mg.gov.br

João Pinheiro is a municipality in the state of Minas Gerais in Brazil. It is the largest municipality in that state by area.

== History ==
The process of colonization of the region, now occupied by the city of João Pinheiro began probably in the half of the 18th century, the period preceding the discovery of gold mines in the regions with the movement of inputs and flags bearing the lands of Paracatu.

Prior to occupancy by the white man, the territory was inhabited only by Amerinds (the tribe of Cataguá) and fugitive blacks of Paracatu and Goiás mines

By 1818, near the banks of the Vereda Extreme came a small town founded by pioneers and drovers who sought the captaincy of Goiás, this was the first landing of the white man in these parts. However, some of these adventurers settled animated by livestock and the diamond mines in the Rio Santo Antônio. It was a fever and this became the main activity of the camp nascent.

The town was named Santana Cheerful, this was the first name of the primitive camp belonging to the bishopric of Pernambuco - which gave the municipality current.

According to oral tradition, a very brave Curraleiro ox that lived in the vicinity of the site, often in the evening, went to the camp and remained there throughout the night mooing. The habit of that animal, called Alegre, intrigued everyone. It is said that this was the reason for the name of settlement.

In 1873, the village of Santana Merry was elevated to district (in land of Paracatu). Until 1902, the mining has been extensively explored by the river Santo Antônio bed and other waterways. On August 30, 1911, Santana Cheerful, received its current name, and went dismembered Paracatu. In 1925 you were granted fora-city and seat of municipality.

The city has a few parties of tradition, as is the case of the Cowboy Festival, held in April, the off-season carnival, João Pirô, held in October and Party City, held in September.

The patron saint is Our Lady of Saint Anne, whose lithurgic celebration happens on July 26.

== Geography ==
=== Climate ===
Climate data for João Pinheiro (1981–2010 normals, extremes 1961–2017)
Month	Jan	Feb	Mar	Apr	May	Jun	Jul	Aug	Sep	Oct	Nov	Dec	Year
Record high °C (°F)	36.6 (97.9)	35.6 (96.1)	39.4 (102.9)	34.4 (93.9)	36.0 (96.8)	32.1 (89.8)	36.8 (98.2)	36.6 (97.9)	38.6 (101.5)	39.8 (103.6)	39.4 (102.9)	37.2 (99.0)	39.8 (103.6)
Mean daily maximum °C (°F)	29.6 (85.3)	30.5 (86.9)	30.0 (86.0)	29.8 (85.6)	28.6 (83.5)	27.8 (82.0)	27.8 (82.0)	29.5 (85.1)	31.3 (88.3)	31.7 (89.1)	30.0 (86.0)	29.3 (84.7)	29.7 (85.5)
Daily mean °C (°F)	24.3 (75.7)	24.9 (76.8)	24.5 (76.1)	24.0 (75.2)	22.5 (72.5)	21.2 (70.2)	21.1 (70.0)	22.5 (72.5)	24.4 (75.9)	25.4 (77.7)	24.3 (75.7)	23.9 (75.0)	23.6 (74.5)
Mean daily minimum °C (°F)	19.8 (67.6)	19.8 (67.6)	19.6 (67.3)	18.9 (66.0)	17.0 (62.6)	15.4 (59.7)	15.0 (59.0)	16.1 (61.0)	18.2 (64.8)	19.3 (66.7)	19.3 (66.7)	19.1 (66.4)	18.1 (64.6)
Record low °C (°F)	11.8 (53.2)	12.8 (55.0)	12.2 (54.0)	8.6 (47.5)	7.2 (45.0)	4.2 (39.6)	3.8 (38.8)	6.6 (43.9)	9.2 (48.6)	11.2 (52.2)	9.6 (49.3)	11.0 (51.8)	3.8 (38.8)
Average precipitation mm (inches)	261.6 (10.30)	170.6 (6.72)	203.8 (8.02)	63.2 (2.49)	27.9 (1.10)	3.4 (0.13)	6.3 (0.25)	11.0 (0.43)	28.1 (1.11)	90.2 (3.55)	217.7 (8.57)	276.9 (10.90)	1,360.7 (53.57)
Average precipitation days (≥ 1.0 mm)	14	12	12	6	2	1	1	1	3	7	13	17	89
Average relative humidity (%)	76.1	73.1	75.2	70.4	66.6	61.7	59.0	54.5	55.0	60.5	72.9	78.7	67.0
Mean monthly sunshine hours	200.9	211.9	219.8	248.9	264.8	268.9	276.5	281.9	256.6	235.3	194.7	184.2	2,844.4
Source: Instituto Nacional de Meteorologia

== See also ==
- List of municipalities in Minas Gerais
