= Cabeceira Grande =

Municipality in the state of Minas Gerais in Brazil

- Municipality
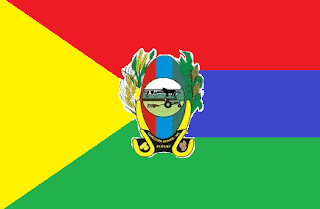
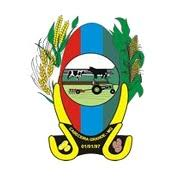
- Flag Coat of arms
- Interactive map of Cabeceira Grande
- Country: Brazil
- State: Minas Gerais
- Region: Southeast
- Time zone: UTC−3 (BRT)

Coordinates: 16°01′58″S 47°04′15″W

Cabeceira Grande is municipality in the northern part of the Brazilian state of Minas Gerais. It is located just south of the boundary with the Federal District and the national capital Brasília. The population was 6,988 (2020) in a total area of 1,026 km^{2}. The elevation of the municipal seat is 923 m above sea level.

== Geography ==
Cabeceira Grande is 11 kilometers east of state highway MG-188, which connects Patrocínio to the national highway BR-40 near Formosa. It is approximately 70 km northwest of the regional center Unaí and is part of the statistical micro-region of Unaí.

== Economy ==
The main economic activities are cattle raising (32,000 head in 2006) and farming, especially the growing of soybeans (7,400 ha.), sorghum (1,000 ha.), corn (5,250 ha.), and beans (4,250 ha.). There was also some planting of coffee, hearts of palm, and rice.

The biggest employers in the town were public administration and farming. In 2007 there were 167 automobiles. There were no banks.

== Health and education ==
The school system there served 1,307 students in primary school in 2006; and 349 in middle school. There were two public health clinics.

== See also ==
- List of municipalities in Minas Gerais
