= Bonfinópolis de Minas =

Municipality in Minas Gerais, Brazil

- Municipality
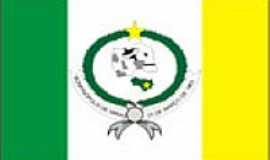
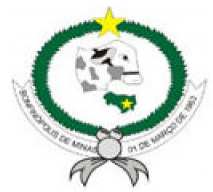
- Flag Coat of arms
- Interactive map of Bonfinópolis de Minas
- Country: Brazil
- State: Minas Gerais
- Region: Southeast
- Time zone: UTC−3 (BRT)

Coordinates: 16°33′44″S 45°58′52″W

Bonfinópolis de Minas is a municipality in the north of the Brazilian state of Minas Gerais. The population of the municipality in 2020 by the Brazilian Institute of Geography and Statistics (IBGE) is 5,444 inhabitants in a total area of 1,778 km^{2}. The elevation of the municipal seat is 651. It became a city in 1962.

Bonfinópolis is located in the statistical micro-region of Unaí. The nearest regional centers are Unaí, João Pinheiro, and Paracatu. Bonfinópolis de Minas is connected to Unaí by MG-181 and BR-251. The distance is 141 km. Most of the road is unpaved.

The economy is based on cattle raising (41,000 head in 2006) and the growing of crops such as cotton (400 ha.), beans (3,635 ha.), soybeans (11,500 ha.), corn (6,800 ha. ), and sorghum (600 ha.). In 2006 there were 632 farms with a total agricultural area of 164,517 ha. 32,000 ha. were planted area. There were 1,909 workers related to the producer and 546 persons not related to the producer. There were 327 tractors.

In the town the biggest sectors of employment were commerce and public administration. In 2007 there were 504 automobiles. There was one financial institution.

The school network had 1,208 students in 13 primary schools and 341 students in one middle school. In the health sector there were 3 public health clinics. The nearest hospital was in Unaí, 141 km. away on bad roads. Many patients go as far as Brasília for more serious treatment.

== Municipal Human Development Index ==
- MHDI: .754
- Ranking in the state: 255 out of 853 municipalities in 2000
- Ranking in the country: 1768 out of 5,138 municipalities in 2000
- Life expectancy: 72.2
- Literacy rate: .83 (See Frigoletto for the complete list for Minas

== See also ==
- List of municipalities in Minas Gerais
