= Buritis =

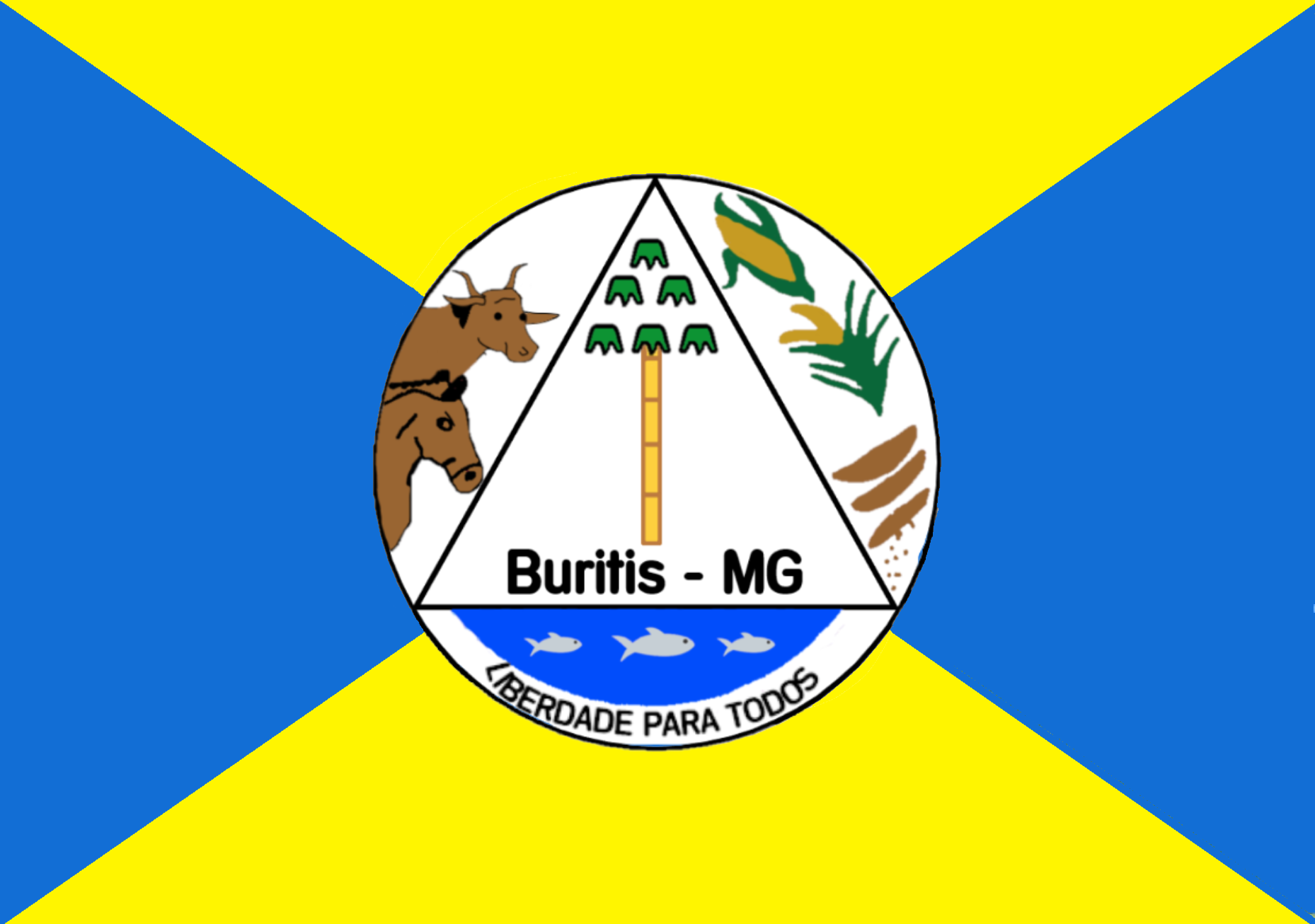
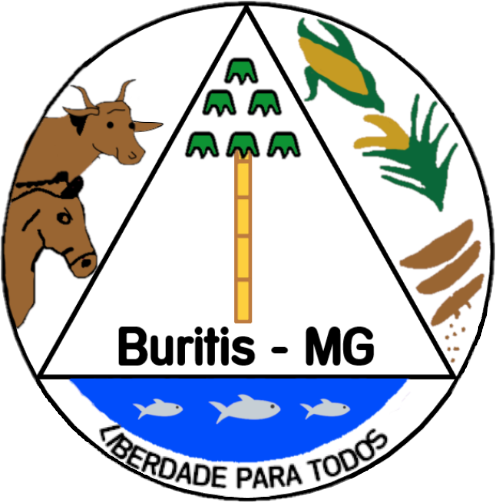
- Flag Coat of arms

- Location of Buritis in the state of Minas Gerais
- Coordinates: 15°37′04″S 46°25′22″W
- Country: Brazil
- State: Minas Gerais
- Established: 1962

Government
  - Mayor: Keny Soares Rodrigues

Area
  - Total: 5,238 km^{2} (2,022 sq mi)
- Elevation: 538 m (1,765 ft)

Population (2020)
  - Total: 25,013
  - Density: 4.775/km^{2} (12.37/sq mi)
- Postal code: 30455-610
- Website: www.buritis.mg.gov.br

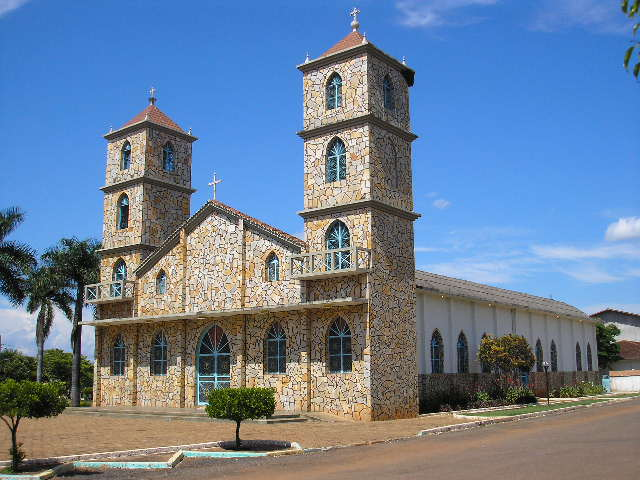
Main church in Buritis

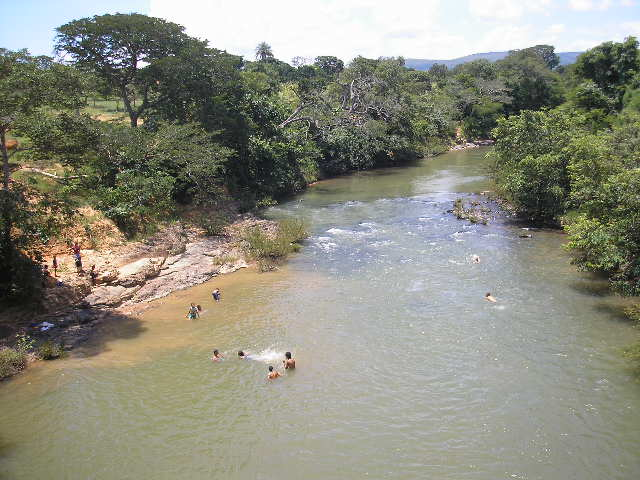
View of a bathing spot in the Ribeirão São Vicente in the municipality of Buritis

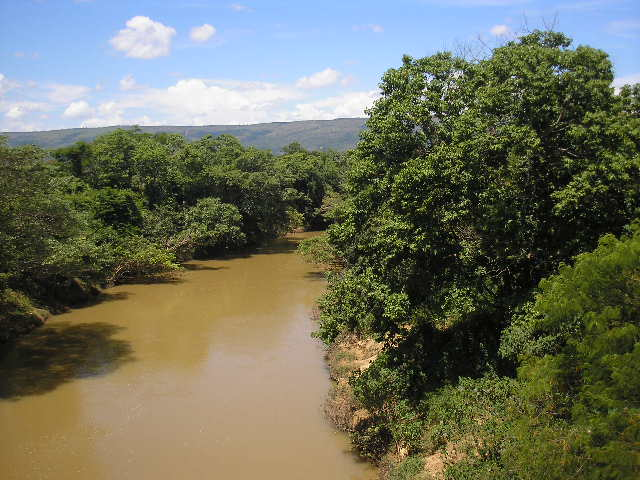
The Urucuia River near Buritis

Buritis is a municipality in northern Minas Gerais state in Brazil. It is located just south of the Urucuia River, which is a tributary of the São Francisco River.

== Geography ==
Surrounding municipalities are Formoso, Arinos, Unaí, and Formosa. There are highway connections linking Buritis with Formosa (approximately 130 km to the west taking BR-030), Unaí (approximately 130 km to the southwest), and Arinos (approximately 110 km. to the southeast).

The municipality contains 21% of the 197,364 hectares (487,700 acres) Jaci Paraná Extractive Reserve, created in 1996. It contains part of the Bom Futuro National Forest, established in 1988.

=== Climate ===
Climate data for Buritis (1981–2010)
Month	Jan	Feb	Mar	Apr	May	Jun	Jul	Aug	Sep	Oct	Nov	Dec	Year
Mean daily maximum °C (°F)	31.4 (88.5)	32.4 (90.3)	31.8 (89.2)	32.0 (89.6)	31.0 (87.8)	30.0 (86.0)	30.5 (86.9)	31.7 (89.1)	33.4 (92.1)	33.9 (93.0)	31.4 (88.5)	30.8 (87.4)	31.7 (89.1)
Daily mean °C (°F)	25.2 (77.4)	25.3 (77.5)	25.2 (77.4)	24.9 (76.8)	23.4 (74.1)	21.3 (70.3)	21.4 (70.5)	22.8 (73.0)	25.6 (78.1)	26.6 (79.9)	25.1 (77.2)	24.9 (76.8)	24.3 (75.7)
Mean daily minimum °C (°F)	20.8 (69.4)	20.1 (68.2)	20.5 (68.9)	19.4 (66.9)	17.3 (63.1)	14.1 (57.4)	13.4 (56.1)	14.7 (58.5)	18.9 (66.0)	20.8 (69.4)	20.6 (69.1)	20.9 (69.6)	18.5 (65.3)
Average precipitation mm (inches)	198.6 (7.82)	129.3 (5.09)	177.0 (6.97)	58.2 (2.29)	22.0 (0.87)	4.6 (0.18)	1.1 (0.04)	7.5 (0.30)	26.3 (1.04)	83.6 (3.29)	230.7 (9.08)	243.8 (9.60)	1,182.7 (46.56)
Average precipitation days (≥ 1.0 mm)	14	10	12	4	2	1	0	1	2	7	14	17	7
Average relative humidity (%)	76.6	75.9	76.5	73.4	69.5	65.8	61.1	53.7	50.7	57.6	72.7	77.5	67.6
Mean monthly sunshine hours	206.1	201.6	208.4	233.8	251.0	254.8	252.3	258.4	227.7	222.9	171.4	150.0	2,638.4
Source: Instituto Nacional de Meteorologia

== Economy ==
The economy is based on cattle raising (88,000 in 2006) and agriculture. Buritis is a large producer of soybeans, beans, and corn. There were some small transformation industries (41 in 2005) and commercial retail establishments (277 in 2005). There were 19 restaurants and small hotels employing 10 workers in 2005. Outside agriculture, the biggest employer in the town was probably public administration with 634 salaried workers in 2005. In 2007 there were 2 financial institutions in the city.

Main agricultural crops in planted area (2006)

- Coagulated rubber: 130 ha.
- Coffee: 70 ha.
- Oranges: 150 ha.
- Cotton: 1,600 ha.
- Rice: 870 ha.
- Sugarcane: 45 ha.
- Beans: 9,500 ha.
- Corn: 13,200 ha.
- Soybeans: 55,000 ha.
- Sorghum: 2,000 ha.

Farm data for 2006

- Number of farms: 1,342
- Area of the farms: 305,085
- Planted area: 66,800 ha.
- Area of natural pasture: 162,645
- Agricultural workers (salaried): 933

== Health and education ==
- Hospitals (2005): 1 private hospital with 29 beds
- Health clinics: 9 (8 public and 1 private)
- Primary school enrollment: 5,044 (265 students in private schools)
- Middle and secondary school enrollment: 891 (34 students in private schools)
- Pre-school enrollment: 400 in public schools and 110 in private schools
- Higher education: 1 with 105 students (2005)

== Tourism ==
The Urucuia waterfall, located on the road that links Buritis to Arinos, has become a tourist attraction. Nearby are the low mountains of Taquaril, Olhos D´água, Bonito, Bonita, São Vicente, Serra Geral and Morcego.

== See also ==
- List of municipalities in Minas Gerais
