= Funil Hydropower Plant =

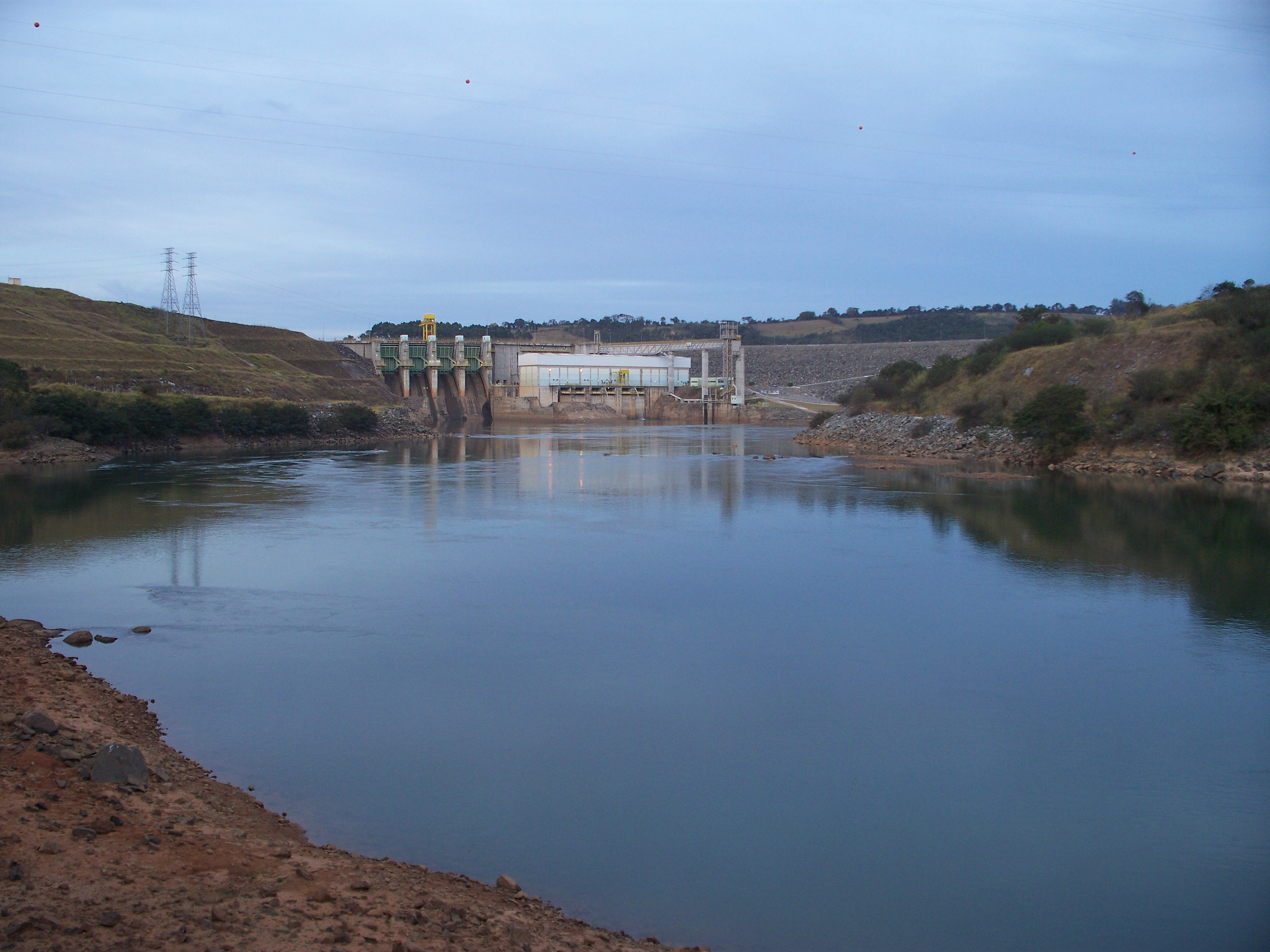

- Location within Brazil
- Interactive map of Funil Hydropower Plant
- Official name: Engenheiro José Mendes Júnior Hydropower plant
- Country: Brazil
- Location: Itatiaia, Rio de Janeiro, Brazil
- Coordinates: 22°31′43.32″S 44°34′4.8″W
- Construction began: September 2000
- Opening date: January 2004
- Owner: Aliança Geração de Energia S.A

Reservoir
- Total capacity: 40,49 km²

Power Station
- Installed capacity: 180 MW

The Engenheiro José Mendes Júnior Hydropower plant, also known as Funil Hydropower Plant, is a conventional hydroelectric power station administered by Aliança Geração de Energia S.A., a partnership between Vale and Cemig. The Funil Plant has an installed capacity of 180 MW with 89 MW of assured average energy in operation.

== Location ==
The plant is located on the Rio Grande, which belongs to the Rio Paraná basin, in southern Minas Gerais, between the municipalities of Perdões and Lavras.

== Timeline ==
The Funil Plant was built in 33 months and its first generating unit went into commercial operation within 27 months of implementation. The construction began in September 2000, and ended in July 2003, with the delivery of the third generating unit.

- 1990: Formulation of Environmental impact Analysis and Report.
- December 1994: Preliminary License is granted.
- September 2000: Installation license is granted and start of construction.
- November 2002: Operation license is granted.
- January 2003: First generation unit goes operational
- June 2003: Second generation unit goes operational
- July 2003: Third generation unit goes operational
- March 2015: The power plant is integrated within the Aliança Geração de Energia S.A. partnership

== Dam ==
At its full operational capacity, the dam floods an area of 40,49 km², covering borders of five municipalities: Lavras, Perdões, Bom Sucesso, Ijaci, and Ibituruna. The installed generation capacity of the plant is 180 MW with a hydraulic design head of 39 meters, utilizing Kaplan turbines.

This facility was the first of its kind in Brazil to implement a fishway to facilitate fish migration. It started operation in January 2004.
