= Lavras =

- Municipality
- Municipality of Lavras
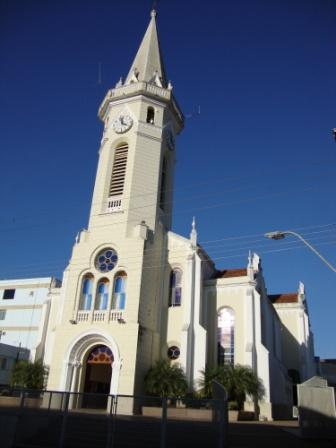
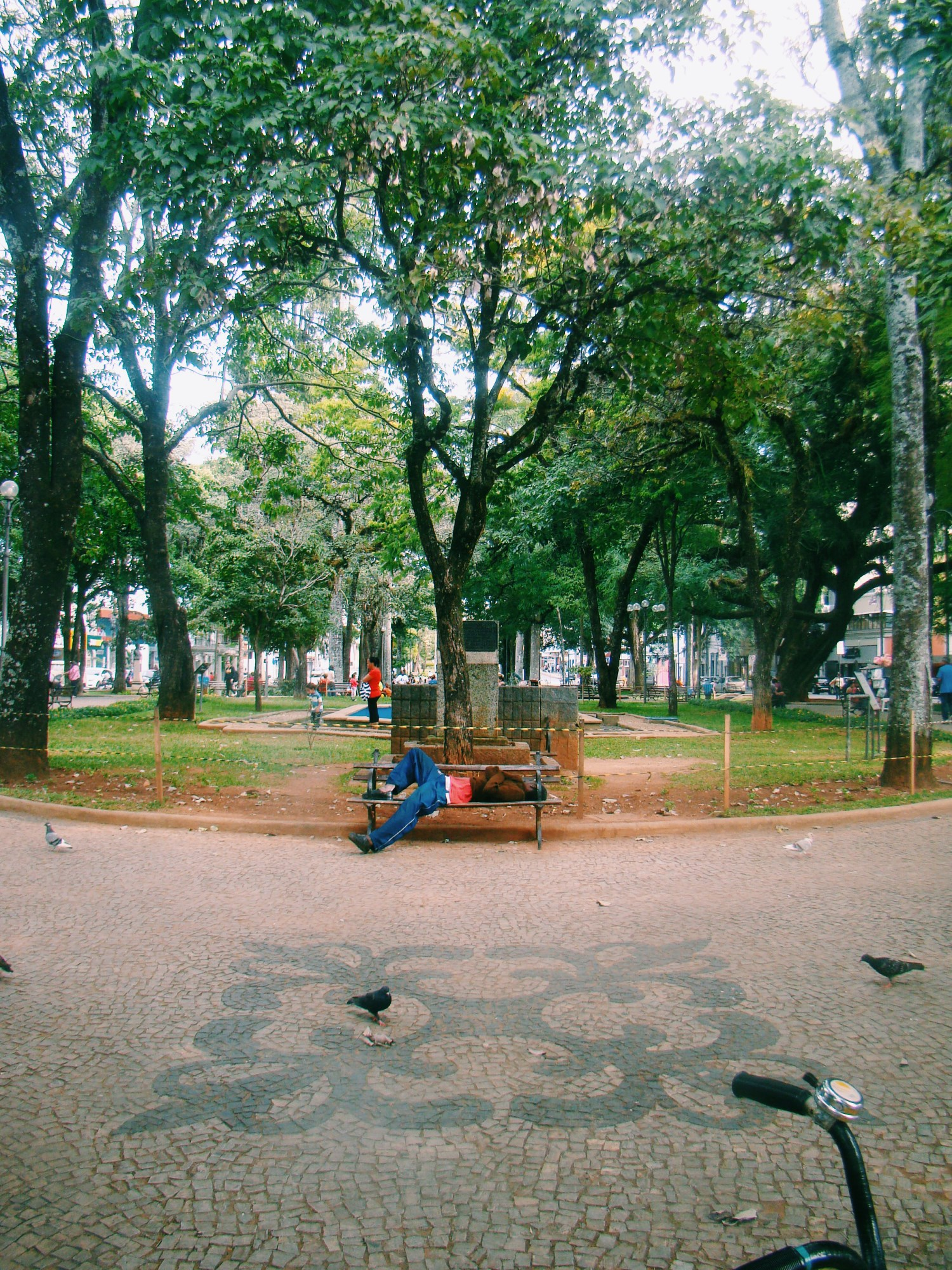
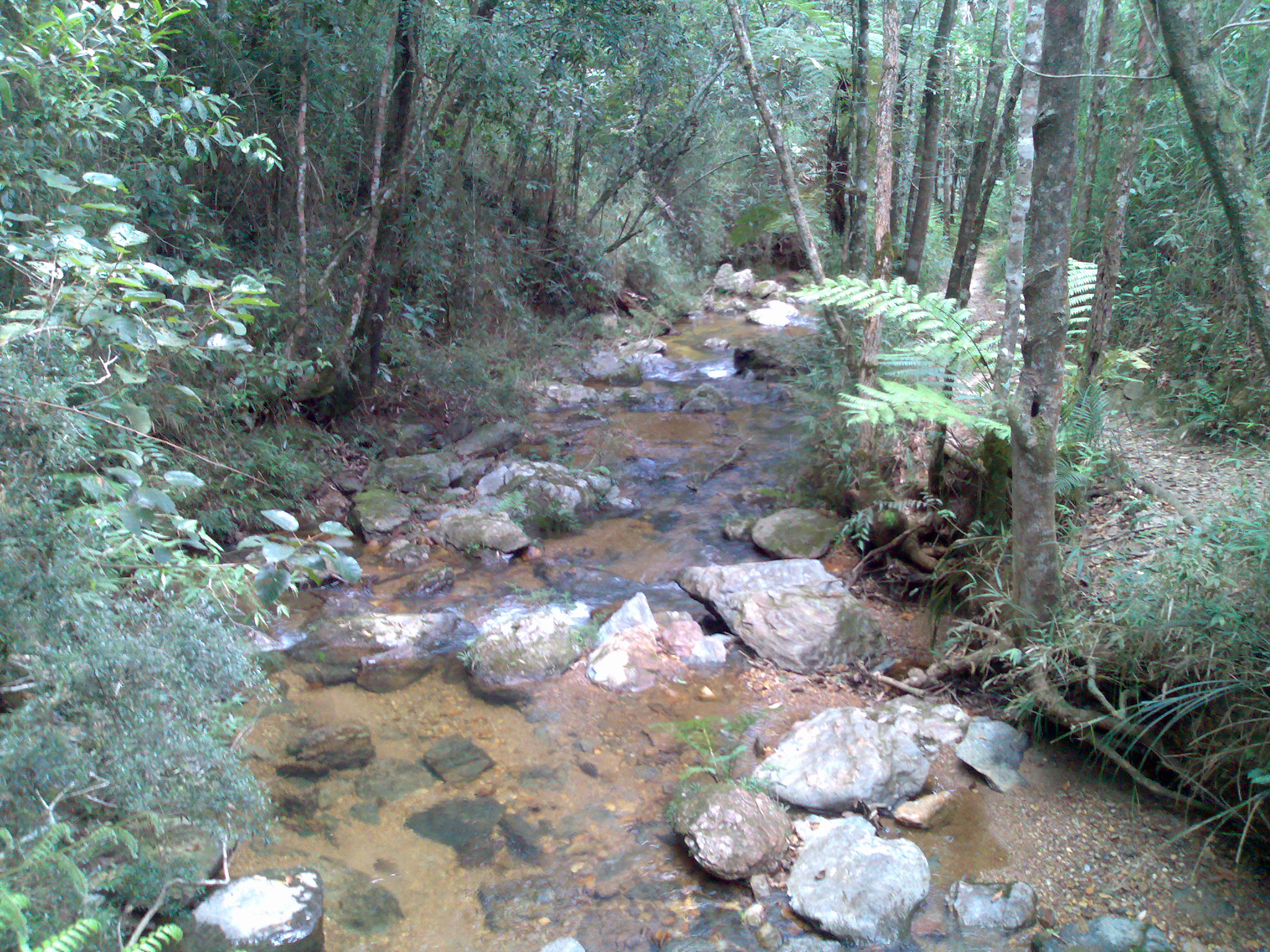
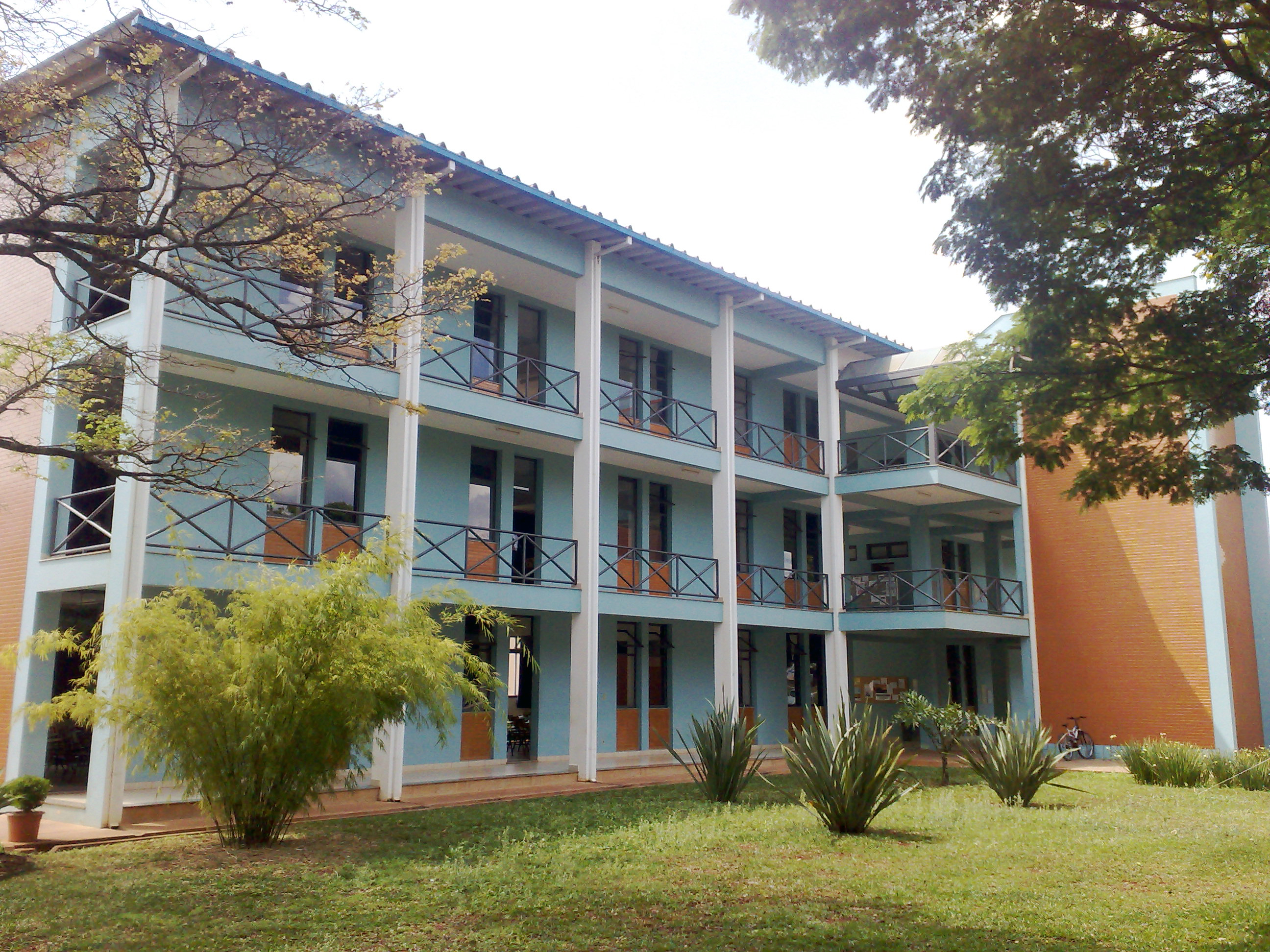
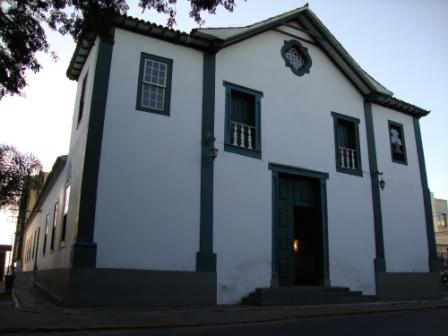
- From the top, from left to right: Saint Anne Parish Church of Lavras, Dr. Augusto Silva Square, Abraham Kasinski Municipal Forest Park, Federal University of Lavras (UFLA) and Our Lady of the Rosary Church.

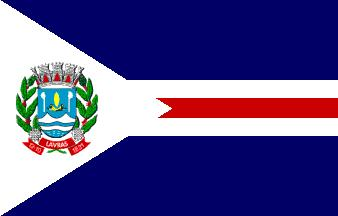
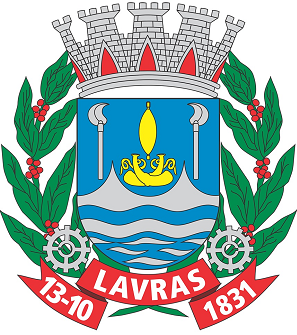
- Flag Coat of arms
- Etymology: Mining and tillage
- Nickname: Cidade dos Ipês e das Escolas ("City of the Ipês and Schools")
- Anthem: Hino do município de Lavras
- Location of Lavras
- Coordinates: 21°14′42″S 45°00′00″W
- Country: Brazil
- Region: Southeast
- State: Minas Gerais
- Mesoregion: Campo das Vertentes
- Foundation: 1729
- Town rights: 1831

Government
  - Mayor: Jussara Menicucci de Oliveira (PSD)

Area
  - Total: 564.495 km^{2} (217.953 sq mi)
- Elevation: 919 m (3,015 ft)

Population (2022 Census)
  - Total: 104,761
  - Estimate (2025): 110,682
  - Density: 185.584/km^{2} (480.659/sq mi)
- Demonym: lavrense
- Time zone: UTC−3 (BRT)
- Postal Code: 37200-000
- Area code: (+55) 35
- Website: lavras.mg.gov.br

Lavras is a municipality in southern Minas Gerais state, Brazil. Located at an altitude of 919 m, it has a population of 104,761 inhabitants (2022 Census). The area of the municipality is 564.495 km^{2}. The average annual temperature is 19.6 °C and the average annual rainfall is 1,511 millimetres.

Located in the Green Valley and Waterfalls tourist circuit, it is also near the Waters circuit – a series of spas in the state of São Paulo and Minas Gerais — and the Inconfidentes Trail circuit – a historical region of Minas. Lavras is connected by highway to the state capital, Belo Horizonte (237 km), to São Paulo (379 km), and Rio de Janeiro (423 km).

== Geography ==
According to IBGE (2017), the municipality belongs to the Immediate Geographic Region of Lavras and the Intermediate Geographic Region of Varginha.

=== Ecclesiastical circumscription ===
The municipality is part of the Roman Catholic Diocese of São João del-Rei.

=== Climate ===
Lavras has a humid subtropical climate (Köppen: Cwa) characterized by rainy summers and warm, dry winters.

Climate data for Lavras (1991–2020)
Month	Jan	Feb	Mar	Apr	May	Jun	Jul	Aug	Sep	Oct	Nov	Dec	Year
Mean daily maximum °C (°F)	29.0 (84.2)	29.5 (85.1)	28.8 (83.8)	27.8 (82.0)	25.3 (77.5)	24.6 (76.3)	25.0 (77.0)	26.8 (80.2)	28.1 (82.6)	28.8 (83.8)	28.0 (82.4)	28.6 (83.5)	27.5 (81.5)
Daily mean °C (°F)	22.8 (73.0)	23.0 (73.4)	22.4 (72.3)	21.1 (70.0)	18.3 (64.9)	17.2 (63.0)	17.2 (63.0)	18.7 (65.7)	20.5 (68.9)	21.9 (71.4)	21.8 (71.2)	22.5 (72.5)	20.6 (69.1)
Mean daily minimum °C (°F)	18.6 (65.5)	18.4 (65.1)	18.0 (64.4)	16.5 (61.7)	13.6 (56.5)	12.1 (53.8)	11.5 (52.7)	12.4 (54.3)	14.6 (58.3)	16.7 (62.1)	17.4 (63.3)	18.3 (64.9)	15.7 (60.3)
Average precipitation mm (inches)	292.4 (11.51)	178.2 (7.02)	162.2 (6.39)	54.6 (2.15)	43.3 (1.70)	19.8 (0.78)	9.5 (0.37)	15.1 (0.59)	55.1 (2.17)	101.0 (3.98)	192.4 (7.57)	259.8 (10.23)	1,383.4 (54.46)
Average precipitation days (≥ 1.0 mm)	16.6	11.6	11.9	5.6	3.2	2.3	1.5	1.8	5.4	8.7	13.4	17.2	99.2
Average relative humidity (%)	76.4	74.5	76.2	73.4	73.9	72.5	66.9	60.5	61.3	66.2	73.7	76.7	71.0
Average dew point °C (°F)	19.1 (66.4)	19.0 (66.2)	18.7 (65.7)	17.2 (63.0)	14.7 (58.5)	13.4 (56.1)	12.3 (54.1)	12.2 (54.0)	13.8 (56.8)	16.1 (61.0)	17.5 (63.5)	18.9 (66.0)	16.1 (61.0)
Mean monthly sunshine hours	181.6	192.3	197.6	222.5	211.9	214.6	237.3	252.6	219.1	206.9	177.9	174.2	2,488.5
Source: NOAA

== History ==
Population growth
Year	Pop.	±% p.a.
1760	1,000	—
1813	10,612	+4.56%
1834	11,322	+0.31%
1854	14,203	+1.14%
1864	18,709	+2.79%
1872	31,813	+6.86%
1890	24,756	−1.38%
1900	38,685	+4.56%
1920	42,859	+0.51%
1940	42,187	−0.08%
1950	27,364	−4.24%
1960	37,262	+3.14%
1970	44,449	+1.78%
1980	52,710	+1.72%
1991	65,893	+2.05%
2000	78,772	+2.00%
2010	92,171	+1.58%
2022	104,761	+1.07%

=== Early settlement ===
The presence of human groups in the territory of Lavras and its Immediate Geographic Region is attested through archaeological sites with records of ceramic artifacts linked to the Aratu tradition, dated between c. 750 – c. 1150 AD. (1200 and 800 years YBP).

The history of Lavras dates back to the early 18th century, amid the fervor of Brazilian gold rush. Around 1720 or 1721, the Paulista explorer Francisco Bueno da Fonseca (c. 1670–1752) — notorious for leading a 1712 revolt against a Portuguese judge in São Paulo — arrived in the fertile region where the Capivari and Mortes rivers flow into the Grande river, accompanied by his sons and other settlers from the village of Santana de Parnaíba. Motivated by the pursuit of gold and the forging of new trails to the mines of Goiás, these pioneers established the hamlet of Sant'Ana das Lavras do Funil around 1729. The name “Lavras” stems from the abundant gold mining excavations (lavras) in the area. In 1737, Governor Martinho de Mendonça de Pina e Proença granted the settlers a sesmaria letter, formalizing their land occupation and fostering early agricultural and livestock activities.

The influence of the Bueno da Fonseca family, holders of the title of capitão-mor, propelled the settlement’s swift growth. On 18 June 1759, Bartolomeu Bueno do Prado — grandson of the legendary bandeirante Anhanguera and son-in-law of Francisco Bueno da Fonseca — departed from the hamlet with a troop of 400 men, drawn from across the Captaincy of Minas Gerais, to dismantle the Quilombo do Campo Grande confederation. By 1760, the population had reached 1,000 inhabitants — twice that of nearby Carrancas — prompting the transfer of the parish seat to the more populous locale. In 1813, the hamlet was elevated to freguesia status upon its detachment from Carrancas, by which time it boasted six curate chapels and 10,612 residents.

=== 19th century ===
During the Imperial period in the 19th century, Lavras achieved political and administrative autonomy, attaining town rights in 1831 and city status in 1868, when its name was shortened from Lavras do Funil to simply Lavras. A report to the municipal chamber by fiscal Manuel Custódio Neto upon its installation in 1832 described a modest town of 245 buildings with no paved streets and only a few public structures: the parish church, the Our Lady of the Rosary Chapel, and the Virgin of Mercy Chapel. The town hosted three private primary schools with a total of 62 students. The 1834 census recorded 11,322 inhabitants in the municipality.

One of the era’s most notable events was Lavras’ involvement in the Liberal Revolution of 1842. For over a month, from 14 June to 22 July, conservatives and liberals maintained rival headquarters in Saint Anne square (now Praça Dr. Augusto Silva). The defeated liberals either fled or were imprisoned, later receiving imperial amnesty.

=== Golden Age ===
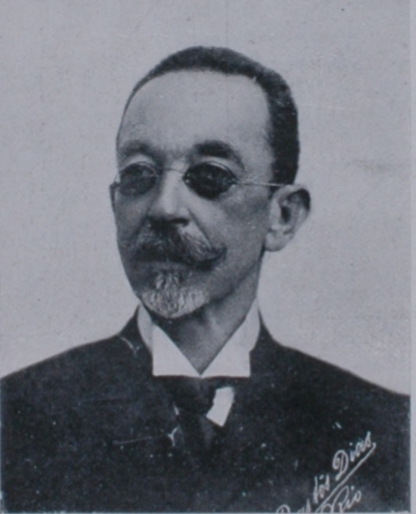
Francisco Salles (1863-1933)

The late 19th and early 20th centuries represented Lavras’ "golden age" of rapid development, spurred by enhanced transportation links. On 18 December 1880, fluvial navigation was inaugurated over 208 km between the ports of Ribeirão Vermelho (in Lavras) and Capetinga (Piumhi), serviced by the steamboat "Dr. Jorge". The Estrada de Ferro Oeste de Minas railway reached Ribeirão Vermelho on 14 April 1888 and extended to Lavras city on 1 April 1895. In 1911, a tram system was introduced, making Lavras one of the few inland Brazilian cities with such infrastructure.

Following the Proclamation of the Republic in 1889, Lavras solidified its role as a key regional hub in Minas Gerais, serving as the birthplace of Francisco Salles, a prominent politician of the Old Republic. This period saw the establishment of several educational institutions, including the Evangelical Institute (founded in 1892 by Samuel Rhea Gammon), Our Lady of Lourdes College (founded in 1900 by Domingos Evangelista Pinheiro) and run by the Congregation of the Auxiliary Sisters of Our Lady of Sorrows, Lavras School Group (founded in 1907 by Firmino Costa), and the Lavras Agricultural School (founded in 1908 by Benjamin Harris Hunnicutt). The city’s reputation for educational excellence led to its enduring nickname, "terra dos ipês e das escolas" ("land of ipês and schools"), coined by journalist Jorge Duarte.

=== Social and political changes ===
Social and political changes reshaped local demographics through immigration. The 1920 Brazilian census documented 806 foreigners in the municipality — 1.9% of the population — including 380 Italians, 189 Portugueses, 166 Lebaneses, 28 Spaniards, 20 Americans, 12 Austrians, five French, two Russians, one Uruguayan and three of undetermined nationality.

The 1920s marked a slowdown in municipal progress, exacerbated by political rivalries within the Mineiro Republican Party. One faction, led by Italian doctor Paulo Menicucci, supported Artur Bernardes for President of Brazil and Raul Soares for President of Minas Gerais. The dissidents, under Colonel Pedro Salles, backed opposition candidates Nilo Peçanha and Francisco Salles. This feud, dubbed the "Doves and Hawks conflict" (Note: Doves because of effeminate psychasthenics tics attributed to Bernardes, and Hawks for associating the cleverness, the cunning spirit, and, of course, as one of the little dove predators.), persisted into the next decade before being overshadowed by the national Estado Novo regime.

By the mid-20th century, Lavras’ current geographic boundaries were established. In the 1933 administrative division, the municipality comprised eight districts: Lavras, Carrancas, Ijaci (formerly Conceição do Rio Grande), Ingaí, Itumirim (formerly Rosário), Itutinga (formerly Santo Antônio da Ponte Nova), Itutinga, Luminárias, and Ribeirão Vermelho. Subsequent emancipations between 1938 and 1962 created neighboring municipalities, leaving Lavras with only its seat district.

=== Progress and stagnation ===
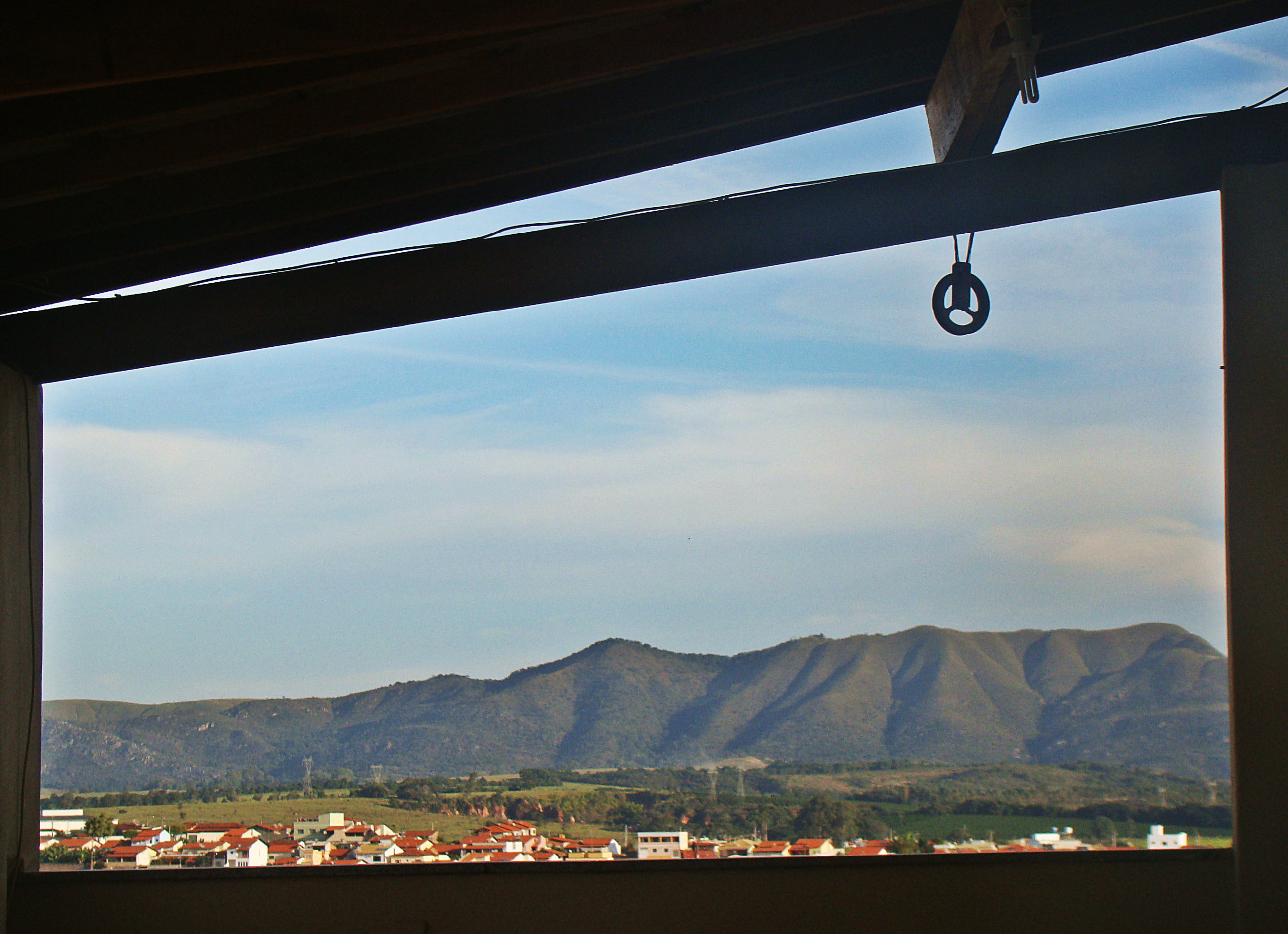
Bocaina mountains

During the populist era of the Fourth Brazilian Republic, Lavras improved its connectivity: an airline operated from 1947 to 1960, and a highway link to the Rodovia Fernão Dias opened in 1962. The Itutinga Hydroelectric Plant, inaugurated in 1955, boosted energy production and stimulated industrial growth.

In the 1950s, Lavras experienced a cultural and sporting renaissance, driven by civic organizations such as the Lavras Friends Society (Sociedade dos Amigos de Lavras, SAL) and the Lavras Society of Artistic Culture (Sociedade Lavrense de Cultura Artística, SOLCA). Activities included theatrical performances, music and poetry recitals, exhibitions, educational initiatives, and football tournaments.

The early 1960s brought turmoil amid national political instability. Arson attacks destroyed historic mansions, the Municipal Theater was demolished in 1962, and the newspaper A Gazeta closed in 1963. The Lavras Agricultural School narrowly avoided closure before being federalized. Other setbacks included the partial collapse of the Our Lady of the Rosary Church in 1965 and the discontinuation of the electric tramway in 1967.

During the 1960s and 1970s, Lavras underwent demographic shifts marked by rural exodus and population stagnation through internal migration. Political underrepresentation persisted until 1983, when Maurício Pádua Souza was elected to the Legislative Assembly of Minas Gerais.

In the 1980s and 1990s, Lavras revitalized its economy with the creation of an industrial district and the arrival of factories such as COFAP in 1988. A major milestone occurred in 1994 with the transformation of the ESAL into the Federal University of Lavras. In 2002, the completion of the Funil Hydropower Plant reshaped the rural landscape and marked Lavras’ consolidation as a modern regional center.

== Economy ==
As 2013, Lavras gross domestic product is R$2,058,203,000, or R$20,965 per capita. Of the GDP, agriculture corresponds to 2.7%, industry to 20.4%, services to 65.3%, while taxes are 11.6%.

=== Agriculture and livestock ===
Lavras agricultural sector stands out especially for the production of coffee and milk, despite the presence of other crops and beef cattle breeding. The production data in 2014 according to the Brazilian Institute of Geography and Statistics:

Permanent farming
	Value (R$ 10^{3})	Area (ha)	Production (t)	Yield (t/ha)
Banana	120	10	120	12
Coffee	36,098	4,610	4,979	1.08
Grape	25	1	7	7
Guava	160	7	84	12
Orange	347	43	559	13
Passion fruit	47	3	36	12
Peach	25	1	13	13

Temporary farming
	Value (R$ 10^{3})	Area (ha)	Production (t)	Yield (t/ha)
Bean	1,230	1,000	820	0.82
Cassava	54	5	90	18
Corn	9,720	4,000	21,600	5,400
Soybean	1,181	450	1,125	2.5
Sugarcane	275	43	3,440	80
Tomato	190	4	200	50

Animal products
	Value (R$ 10^{3})	Production
Fish	54	9,000 kg
Honey	196	28,000 kg
Chicken egg	29,958	7,490,000 doz
Quail egg	6,019	7,524,000 doz

Livestock (Animals amount)
Bovinae	Cows	Galliformes	Chicken	Quail	Equinae	Goat	Sheep	Swine
27,440	6,890	912,540	389,687	387,851	1,500	100	550	8,500

== Education ==
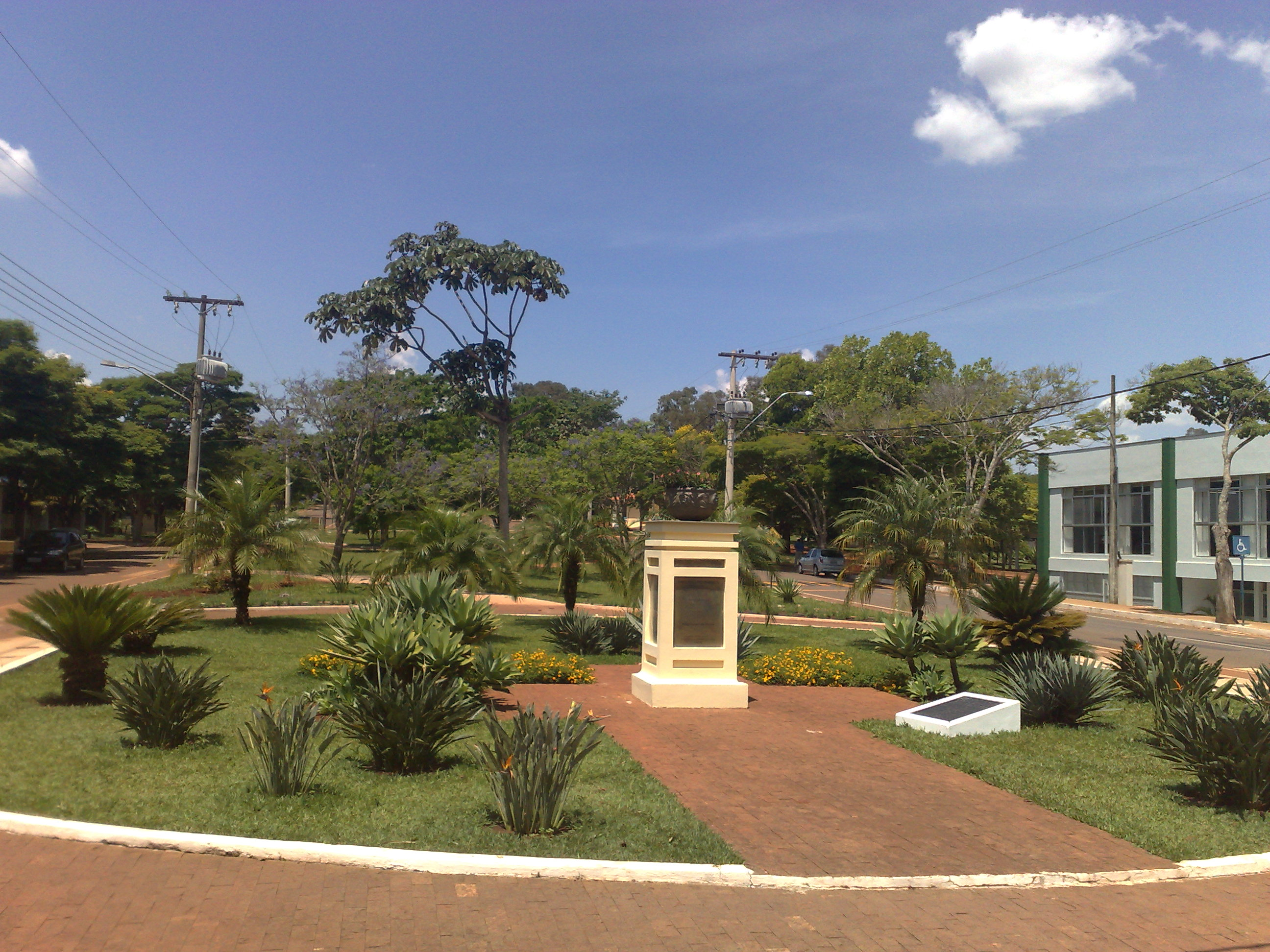
Universidade Federal de Lavras

In 2012, Lavras had 31 preschool, 37 primary schools, 16 secondary schools and 3 special education centers. There were 18,671 students and 1,127 teachers. Lavras has also 9 higher education universities and faculties.

	Preschool			Primary schools			Secondary schools		
	Schools	Teachers	Student	Schools	Teachers	Student	Schools	Teachers	Student
Municipal School	21	89	1721	18	305	6234	0	0	0
State School	0	0	0	8	193	3671	7	160	3008
Private School	10	44	456	11	207	2394	9	129	1187
Total	31	133	2177	37	705	12299	16	289	4195
Ministério da Educação, Instituto Nacional de Estudos e Pesquisas Educacionais – INEP – Censo Educacional 2012.

=== Federal University of Lavras ===
Lavras has one of Brazil's top universities, the Federal University of Lavras. Founded in 1908 it is well known in Brazil and abroad for its courses in agronomy and veterinary science. There are 6,090 undergraduate students and 2,059 on postgraduate programs.

== Transport ==
Lavras was a station on the Estrada de Ferro Oeste de Minas, a narrow gauge railway.

== Sports ==
Lavras is home of Fabril Esporte Clube, a football club that achieved minor success during the 1980s in Minas Gerais state championship. Some famous athletes were born in Lavras, as the Brazil national football team defenders Alemão and Caçapa and the Bronze medal Olympic winner volleyball player Ana Paula Henkel.

== See also ==
- List of municipalities in Minas Gerais
