= Pedro Botelho =

Pedro Botelho may refer to:

- Pedro Botelho (footballer, born 1987), Brazilian football defender
- Pedro Botelho (footballer, born 1989), Brazilian football defender
