= Our Lady of the Rosary Church, Lavras =

Our Lady of the Rosary Church of Lavras

Our Lady of the Rosary Church of Lavras
- Igreja de Nossa Senhora do Rosário de Lavras
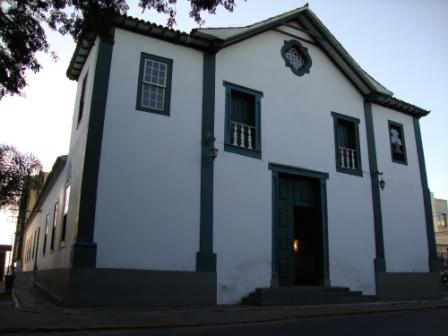
- Front and side view of the church

Religion
- Affiliation: Catholic
- Rite: Roman
- Ownership: Diocese of São João del-Rei
- Leadership: Túlio Marcos Ribeiro Corrêa, SCJ
- Patron: Our Lady of the Rosary
- Year consecrated: 1754 (as Saint Anne Church) 1917 (as Our Lady of the Rosary Church)
- Status: Open

Location
- Municipality: Lavras
- State: Minas Gerais
- Country: Brazil
- Interactive map of Our Lady of the Rosary Church of Lavras
- Administration: Saint Anne of Lavras Parish
- Coordinates: 21°14′42″S 44°59′59″W

Architecture
- Architect: Luís Pinheiro de Souza (attributed)
- Type: Colonial exterior
- Style: Baroque–Rococo interior
- Groundbreaking: 1751
- Completed: 1854
- Direction of façade: East
- Designated as NHL

National Historic Heritage of Brazil
- Designated: 1948
- Reference no.: 368-T-1948, Inscription No. 316

Website
- www.paroquiasantanadelavras.com.br

The Our Lady of the Rosary Church is the oldest surviving structure in the city of Lavras, in the state of Minas Gerais, Brazil. Constructed in the mid-18th century, it exemplifies colonial architecture with a richly decorated Baroque–Rococo interior and has served as a significant religious and cultural landmark.

== History ==
Originally built between 1751 and 1754 as the Saint Anne Chapel on land donated by Captain Luiz Gomes de Morais Salgado, the structure was elevated to parish church status in 1760 following the transfer of the parish seat from Carrancas. The nave was completed by 1765.

In 1810, a separate church dedicated to Our Lady of the Rosary was erected at the site now occupied by the upper part of Leonardo Venerando Square. That building was demolished in 1904 to allow construction of a new parish church dedicated to Saint Anne. Upon its inauguration in 1917, the older church — formerly the main parish church — adopted the dedication to Our Lady of the Rosary.

During the 19th century, particularly around the time Lavras attaining town rights in 1831, Father Francisco d'Assis Braziel used one of the church's rooms to teach Latin, French, geography, drawing, arithmetic, and music. A cemetery surrounded the church until 1853, when the Saint Michael Cemetery was opened on the southern edge of the town. In 1875, lottery funds supported a major restoration.

In the 20th century, two new bells were installed in 1928, cast in Divinópolis and purchased by Father Fernando Baumhoff, SCJ, the first parish priest of the Congregation of the Priests of the Sacred Heart of Jesus to serve in Lavras. Local teacher José Luiz de Mesquita recorded that the bells were christened "Francelino" and "Jerônimo II".

== Heritage status ==
By the 1930s, the church had fallen into disrepair and was rarely used except during Holy Week. In 1940, plans emerged to demolish it for a social club, but community leader José Luiz de Mesquita (1887–1967) — a founder of the local Society of Saint Vincent de Paul, which had met in the church since 1908 — alerted Rodrigo Melo Franco de Andrade, director of the federal heritage agency (later IPHAN).

This intervention, supported by Bishop Dom Inocêncio Engelke, OFM, was halted after press coverage by Mesquita and Canon Francisco Maria Bueno de Sequeira. Partial collapses in 1944 sparked public debate and a preservation campaign led by Mesquita and others. The effort succeeded: the church was designated a National Historic and Artistic Heritage site in 1948 and restored with federal funding in 1949.

Further neglect in the mid-20th century led to closure from 1964 to 1982, punctuated by serious structural failures in 1965 and 1969. In 1982, municipal funds under Mayor Maurício Pádua Souza enabled extensive repairs, and the church reopened on 8 May 1982.

Since 1990, it has housed the Lavras Sacred Museum, established through collaboration between the Saint Anne Parish, the municipal government, and the Bi Moreira Museum.

== 21st-century developments ==
The church was inscribed as municipal cultural heritage in 2002. Regular religious services resumed in 2008 following restoration of the altarpieces and chancel ceiling paintings. In 2019, the churchyard and adjacent João Oscar de Pádua Square were repaved with new stone.

During Lavras' tricentennial celebrations in 2020, Father Túlio Corrêa, SCJ, blessed a new "Tricentennial Cross" crafted by local artisan Alexandre Reis, restoring a rooftop cross absent for 38 years. A community campaign in 2023 funded 48 new wooden pews, and Bishop Dom José Eudes Campos do Nascimento of São João del-Rei dedicated the new altar and ambo.

== Sacred art collection ==
Art historian Moacyr Villela attributed the wooden altar carvings to Portuguese sculptor José Maria da Silva (c. 1784), though many scholars favor local 18th-century masters from the Rio das Mortes region, such as Luís Pinheiro de Souza or Francisco de Lima Cerqueira. Ceiling paintings in the chancel, dating to around 1805, are attributed to Joaquim José da Natividade, a mulatto artist from São João del-Rei.

The collection includes life-size polychrome wooden statues central to Holy Week processions: the Lord of Triumph, Lord of the Steps, Our Lady of Sorrows, Good Jesus of the Green Cane, and the Dead Christ. Other 18th- and 19th-century images depict Saint Anthony, Saint Francis of Assisi, Our Lady of Mount Carmel, and Our Lady of the Rosary. Images of Saint Benedict, Saint Michael, and Saint Ephigenia have been lost.

An image of Saint Anne the Teacher, which occupied the high altar throne until 1917, was designated municipal heritage in 2020. In 2020, the oil painting Verônica — also attributed to Joaquim José da Natividade and absent for 62 years — was returned after rescue efforts by William Daghlian Previously held by the São Paulo Museum of Art, it was restored in 2017 and first re-exhibited in the church in 2021 during the Fourth Lavras Cultural Heritage Forum.

As 2026, restoration of the altarpieces remains pending, with an estimated cost of R$ 500,000.

== Gallery ==
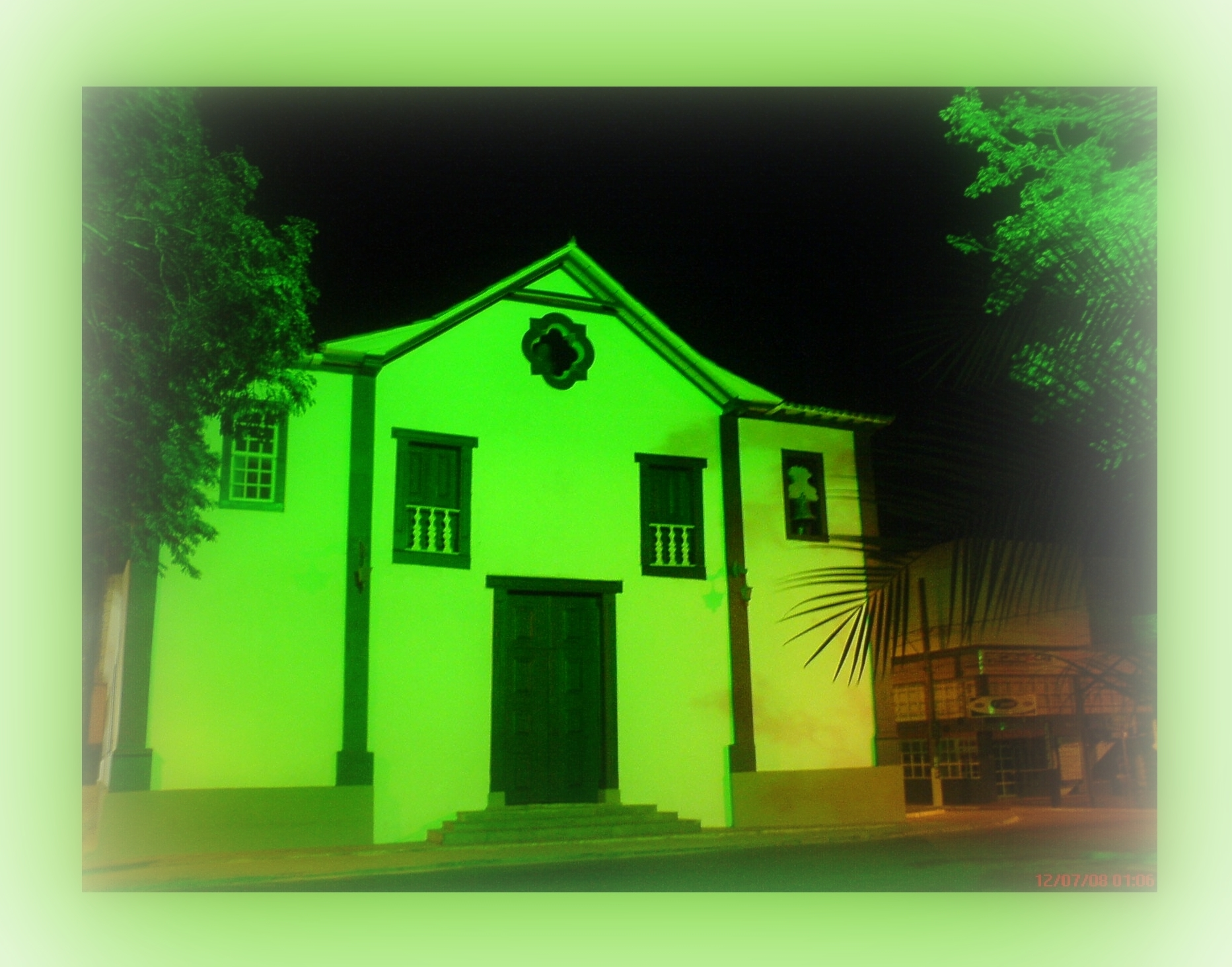
Night photo.

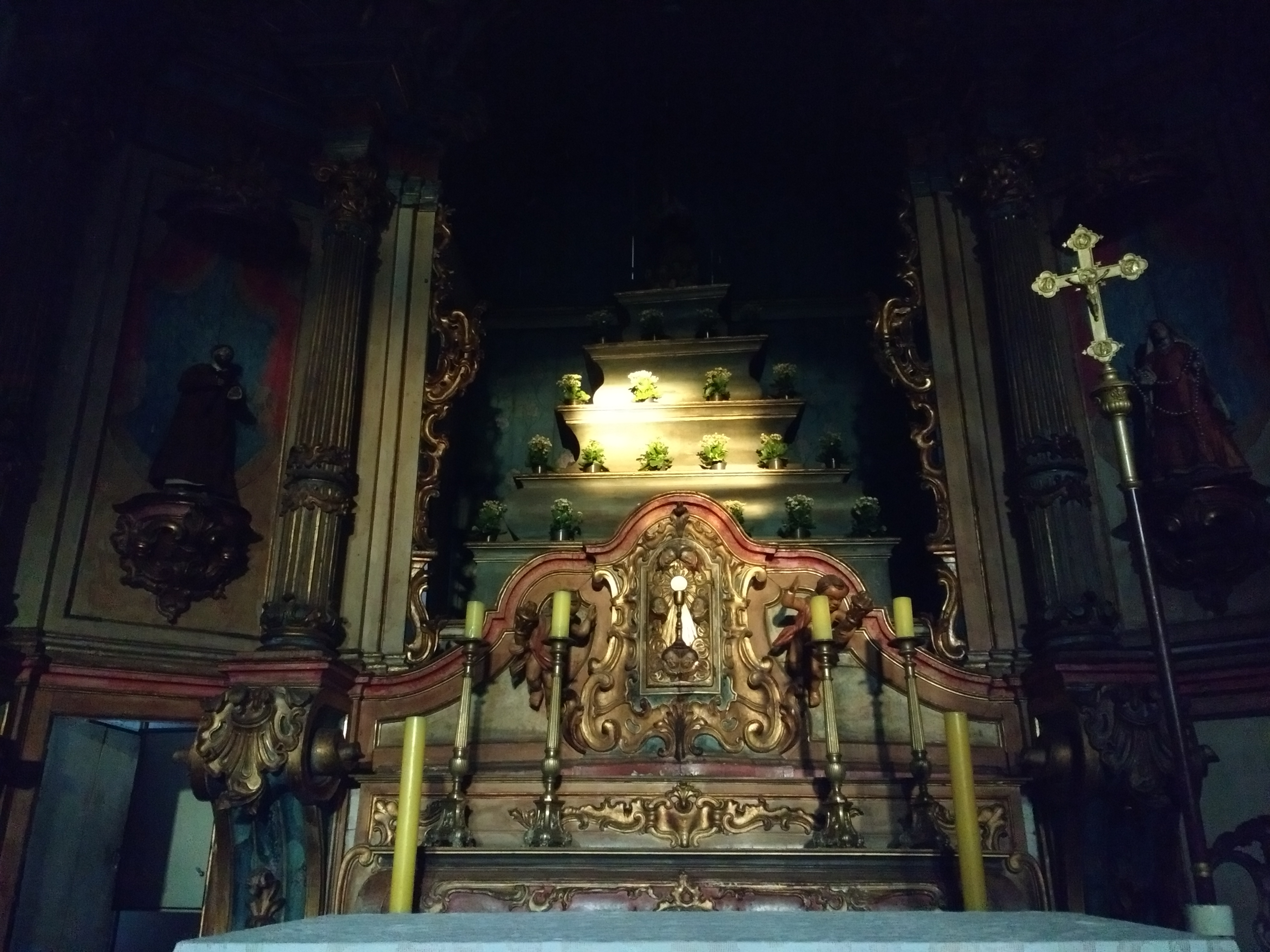
Altar.

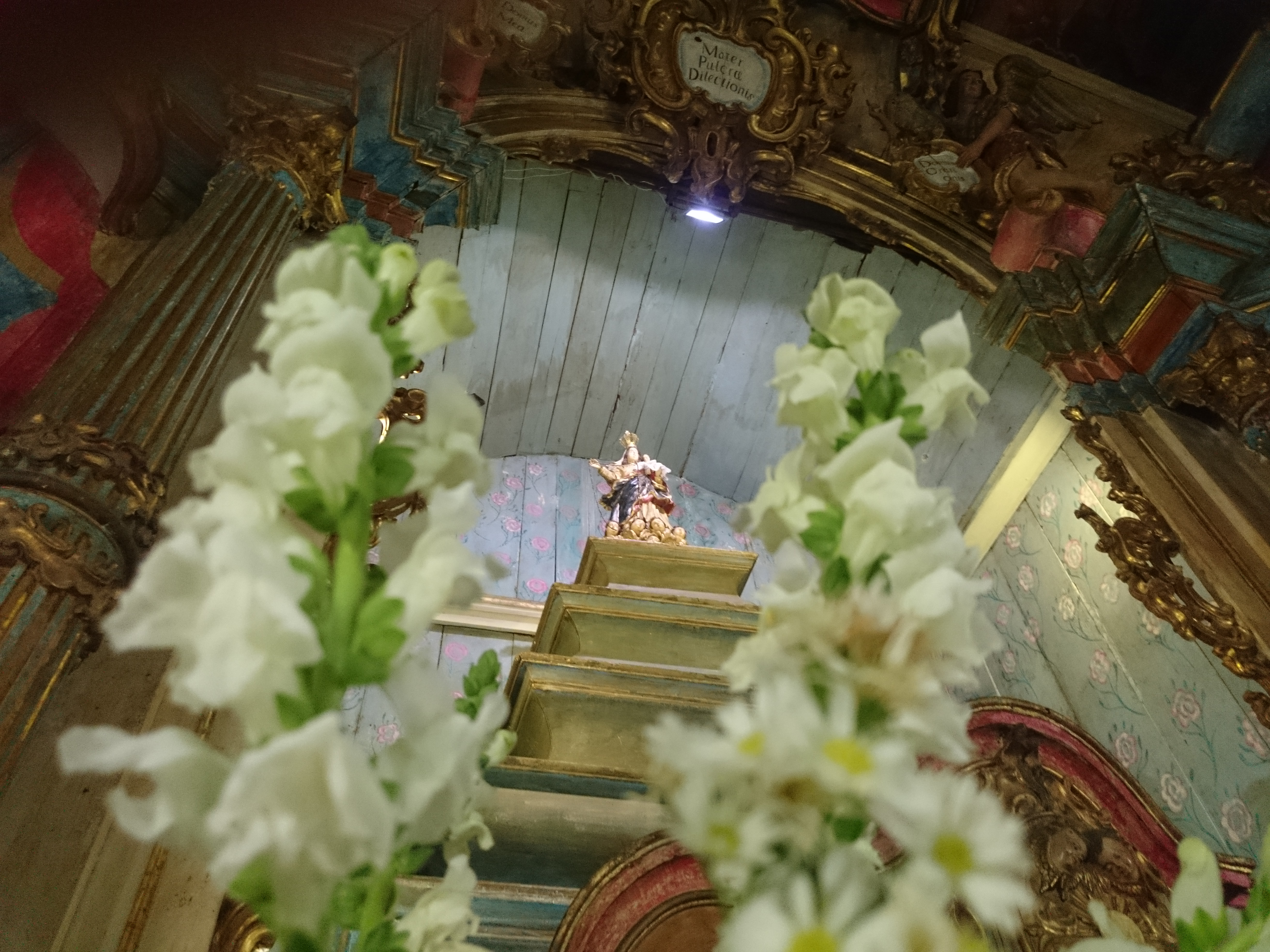
Our Lady of the Rosary Church Image.

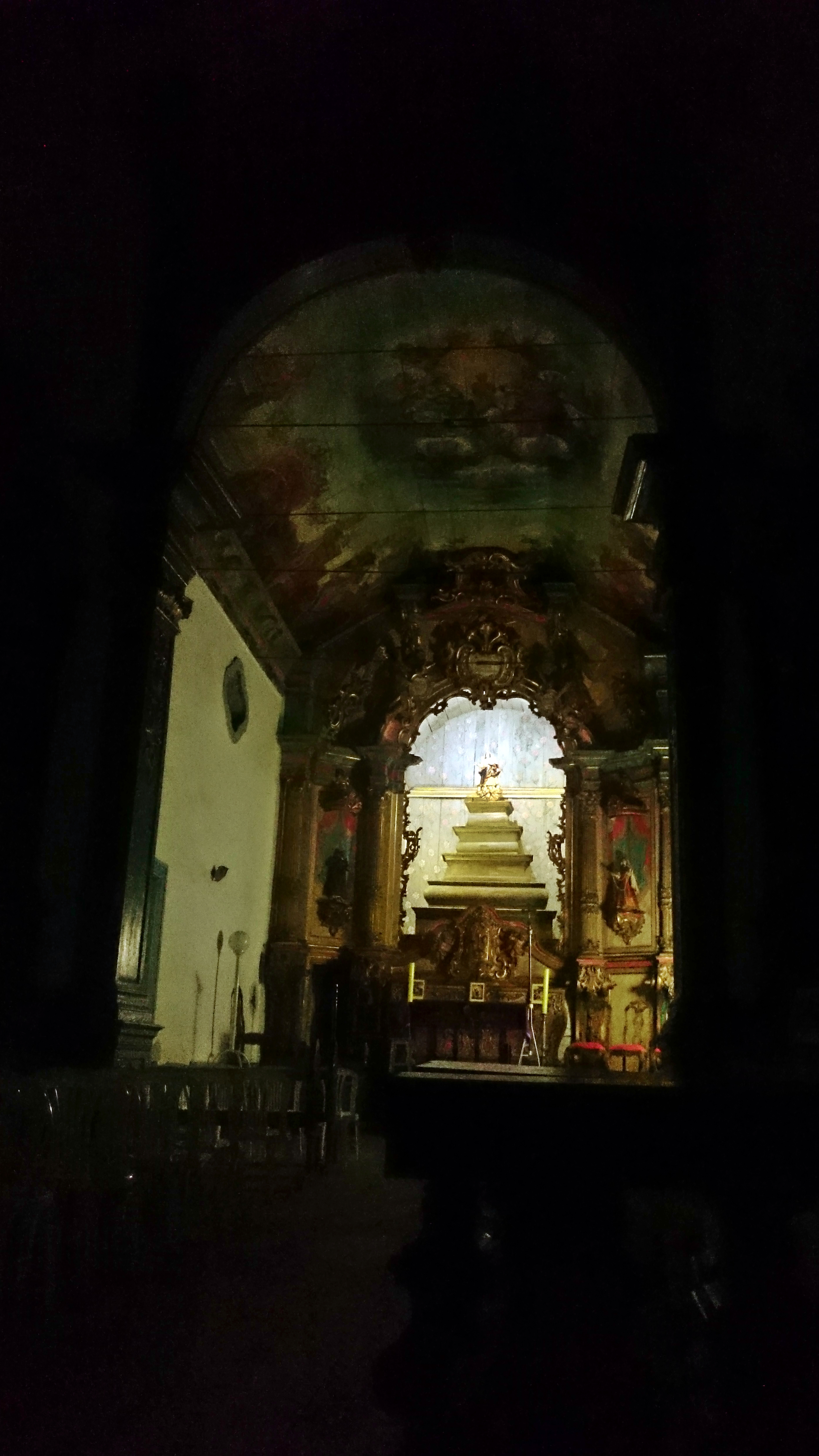
Interior.

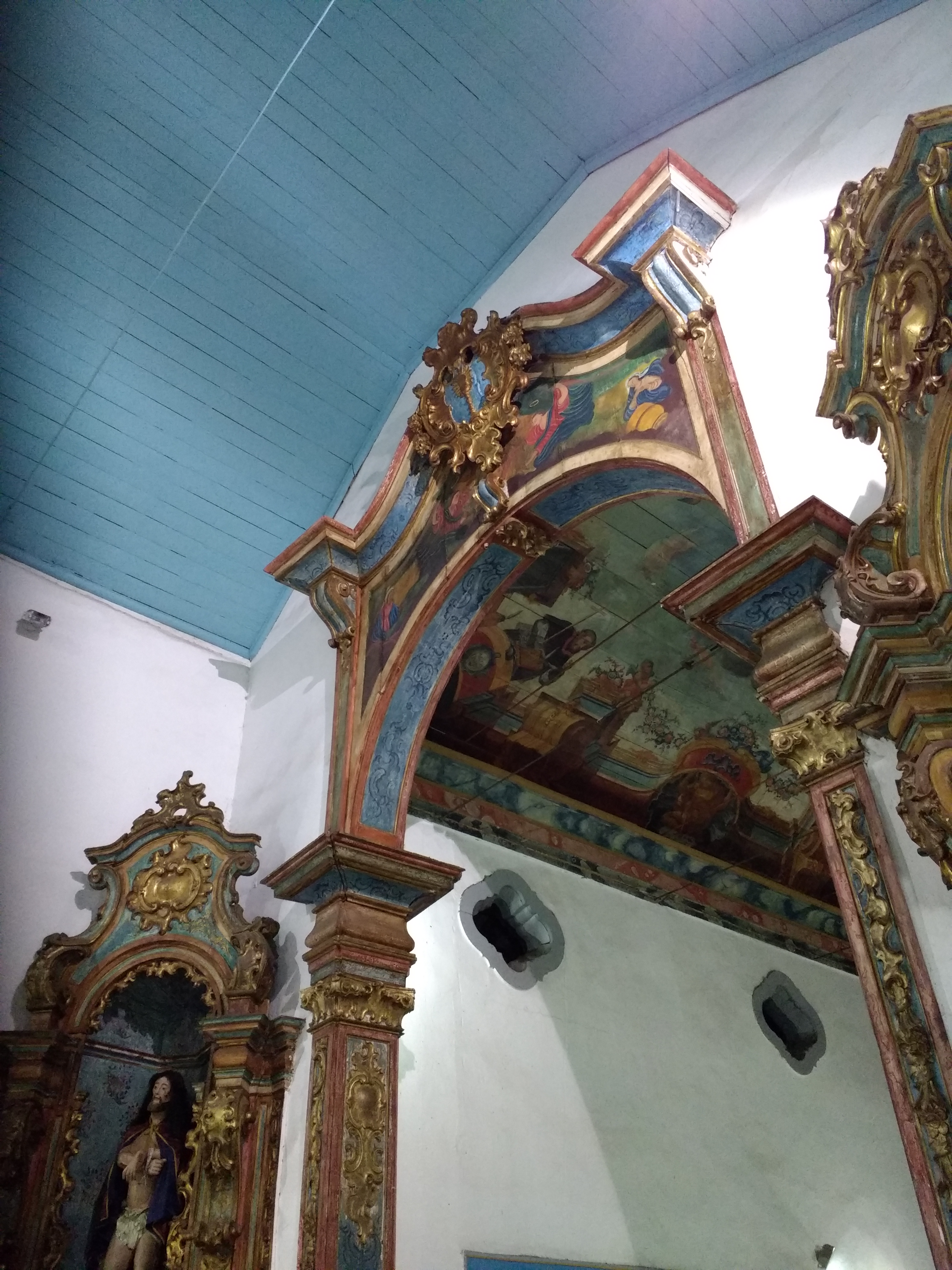
Arch.

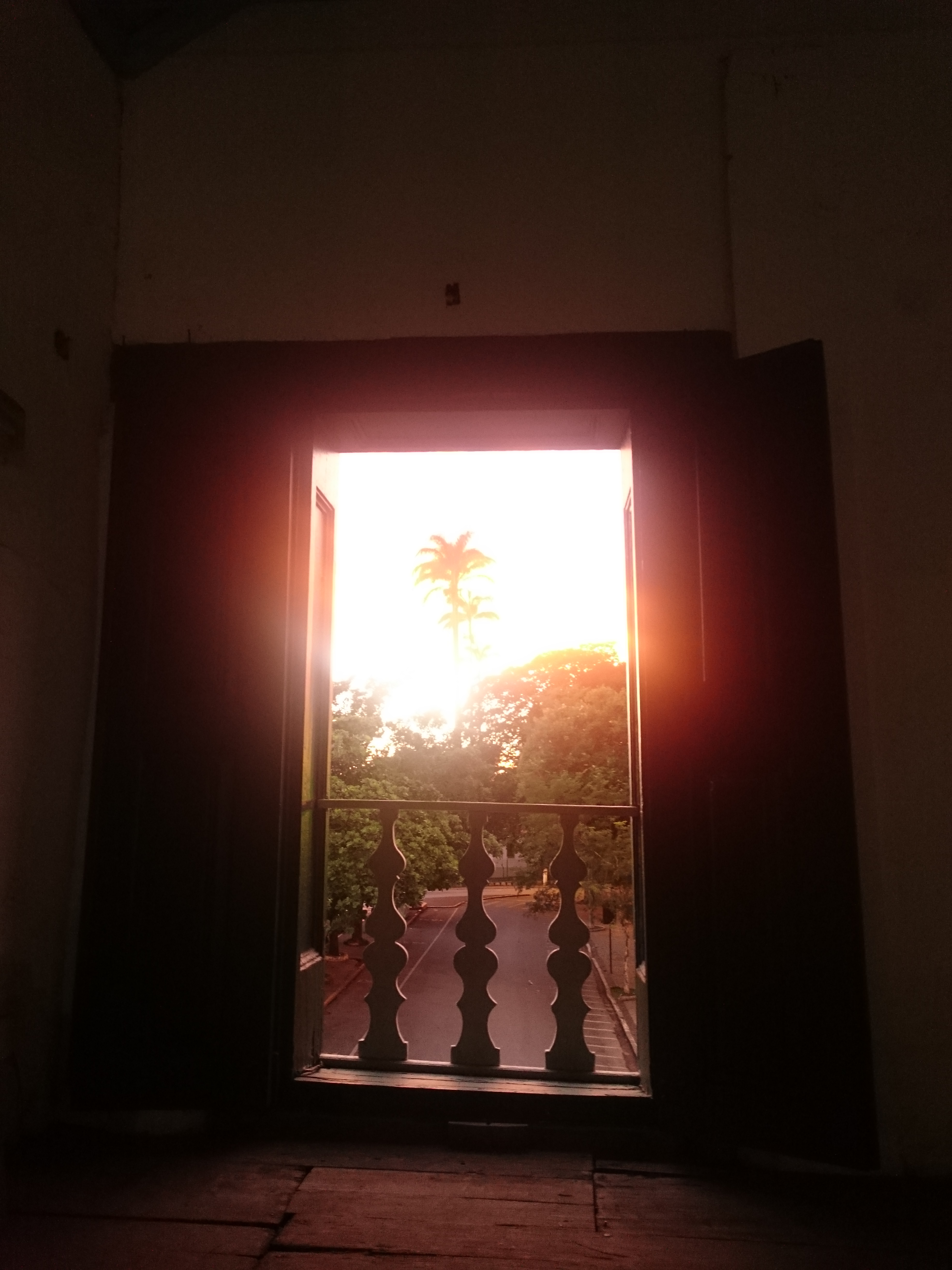
Window at dawn.

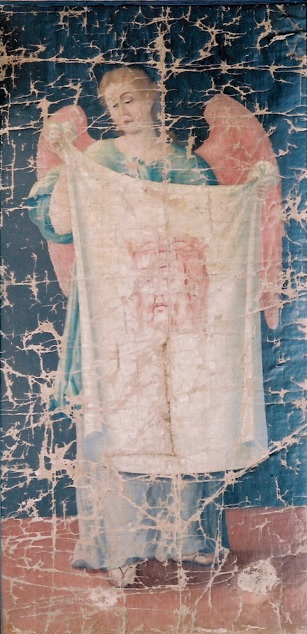
Oil Verônica. Attributed to Joaquim José da Natividade, c. 1805.
