= Santa Bárbara do Tugúrio =

Brazilian municipality in Minas Gerais

Coordinates: 21°14′45″S 43°33′32″W

- Municipality
- Interactive map of Santa Bárbara do Tugúrio
- Country: Brazil
- State: Minas Gerais
- Region: Southeast

Population (2022 Census)
  - Total: 4,208
  - Estimate (2025): 4,245
- Time zone: UTC−3 (BRT)

Location of Santa Bárbara do Tugúrio within Minas Gerais

Santa Bárbara do Tugúrio is a Brazilian municipality located in the state of Minas Gerais. The city belongs to the mesoregion of Campo das Vertentes and to the microregion of Barbacena. In 2025, the estimated population was 4,245.

== See also ==
- List of municipalities in Minas Gerais
