= Carrancas, Minas Gerais =

Carrancas
- Municipality
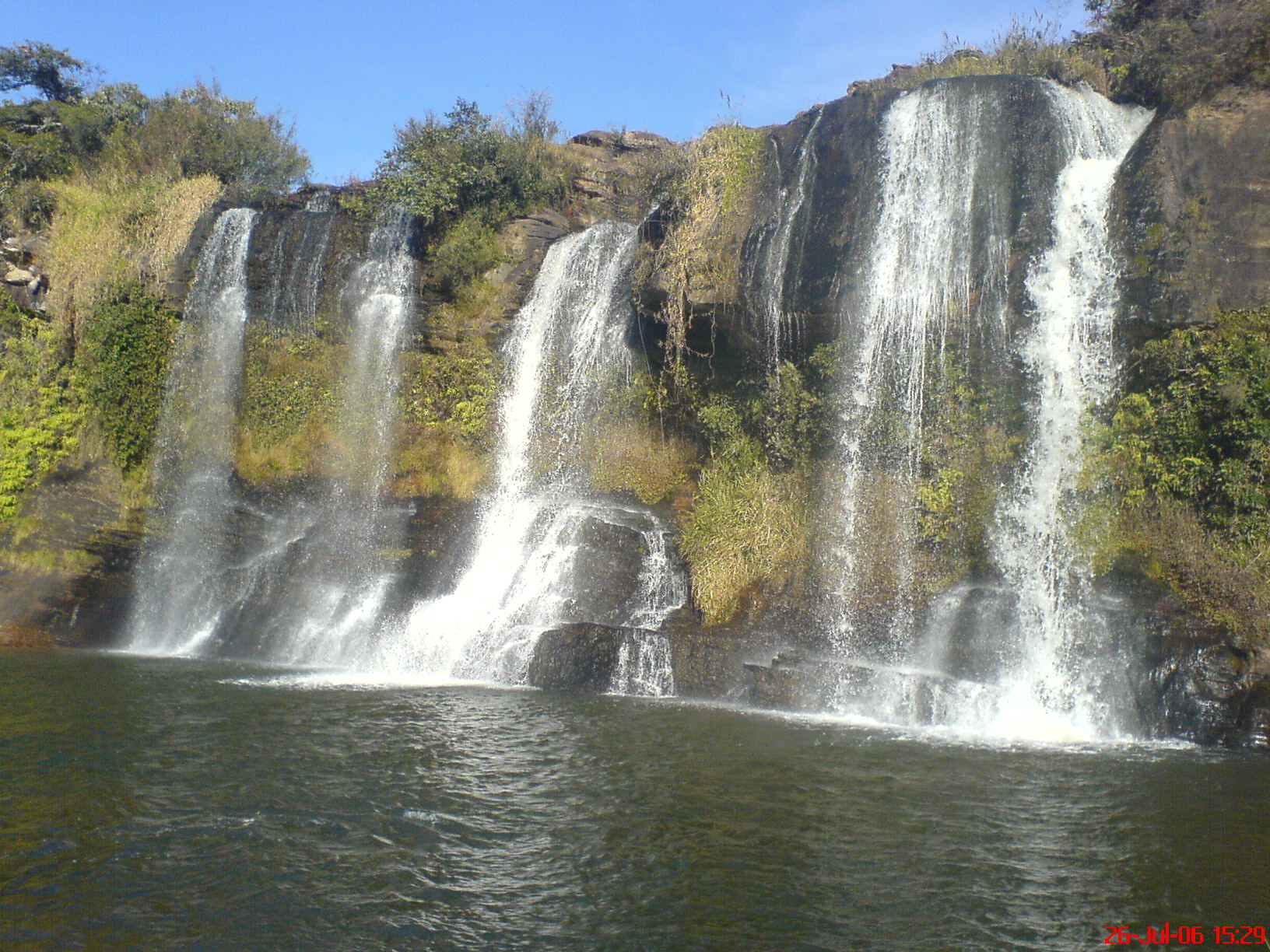

- Location in the state of Minas Gerais

- Location in Brazil
- Coordinates: 21°30′S 44°39′W
- Country: Brazil
- Region: Southeast
- State: Minas Gerais
- Mesoregion: Campo das Vertentes

Area
  - Total: 728 km^{2} (281 sq mi)
- Elevation: 1,052 m (3,451 ft)

Population (2020)
  - Total: 4,049
- Time zone: UTC−3 (BRT)
- Website: www.carrancas.mg.gov.br

Carrancas is a Brazilian municipality located in the south of the state of Minas Gerais. The city belongs to the mesoregion of Campo das Vertentes and to the microregion of Lavras. In 2020 the population was 4,049 in a total area of 728 km^{2}.

Carrancas lies on a railroad line and is connected to the regional center, Lavras, by dirt roads. The main agricultural products are sugarcane, coffee, bananas, and corn.

== Geography ==
According to IBGE (2017), the municipality is in the Immediate Geographic Region of Lavras, in the Intermediate Geographic Region of Varginha.

=== Ecclesiastical circumscription ===
The municipality is part of the Roman Catholic Diocese of São João del-Rei.

== See also ==
- List of municipalities in Minas Gerais
- Carranca
