= Pedro Botelho (footballer, born 1987) =

Brazilian footballer

Personal information
- Full name: Pedro Henrique Botelho
- Date of birth: 4 April 1987 (age 39)
- Place of birth: Perdões, Brazil
- Height: 1.69 m (5 ft 7 in)
- Position: Defender

Youth career
- Flamengo

Senior career*
Years	Team	Apps	(Gls)
2006	Flamengo	0	(0)
2007–2008	Vėtra	22	(1)
2007	→ Krylia Sovetov Samara (loan)	1	(0)
2008	Sūduva	11	(1)
- * Club domestic league appearances and goals

Pedro Henrique Botelho (born 4 April 1987) is a Brazilian former football player.

== Club career ==
He played in one Russian Premier League match for PFC Krylia Sovetov Samara during the 2007 season.
