= Federal University of Lavras =

University in Brazil

- Universidade Federal de Lavras
- Motto: Ciência e Prática (Science and Practice)
- Type: Public federal university
- Established: September 5, 1908; 118 years ago (as Lavras Agricultural School)
- Affiliations: MEC, CRUB, ANDIFES
- Rector: José Roberto Soares Scolforo
- Location: Lavras, Minas Gerais, Brazil
- Campus: Main Campus (Lavras) and São Sebastião do Paraíso Campus
- Colors: Blue and White
- Website: www.ufla.br/english

The Federal University of Lavras (Universidade Federal de Lavras, UFLA) is a public federal research university based in Lavras, Minas Gerais, Brazil. Founded in 1908, it is widely regarded as one of the leading institutions in agricultural sciences in Latin America and consistently ranks among the top ten universities in Brazil according to the Ministry of Education's General Course Index (IGC).

== History ==
=== Foundation (1908–1963) ===
The university was established on September 5, 1908, as the Lavras Agricultural School (Escola Agrícola de Lavras). It was founded by Dr. Samuel Rhea Gammon, an American Presbyterian missionary, and Dr. Benjamin Harris Hunnicutt, who served as its first director. The school's initial mission was to modernize Brazilian agriculture by introducing scientific methods, such as the use of silos and modern machinery.

=== Federalization and ESAL (1963–1994) ===
In 1963, the institution was federalized and became the Superior School of Agriculture of Lavras (Escola Superior de Agricultura de Lavras - ESAL). This transition into the public sector provided the financial stability necessary for a significant expansion in scientific research and the creation of the first graduate programs in the 1970s.

=== Transition to University (1994–Present) ===
On December 23, 1994, President Itamar Franco signed Law No. 8,956, transforming ESAL into the Federal University of Lavras (UFLA). Following the national REUNI program in 2007, the university underwent a massive expansion, diversifying its curriculum to include Medicine, Law, Engineering, and the Humanities.

== Academic Structure ==
UFLA is organized into several academic units:

- ESAL – School of Agricultural Sciences of Lavras
- FCS – Faculty of Health Sciences
- FENG – Faculty of Engineering
- FCSA – Faculty of Applied Social Sciences
- FAED – Faculty of Philosophy, Languages, Education, and Human Sciences
- ICET – Institute of Exact and Technological Sciences
- ICN – Institute of Natural Sciences

== Campus and Infrastructure ==
The main campus in Lavras is renowned for its sustainable urban planning and vast green areas, including:

- Bi Moreira Museum: Located on the historic campus, it houses an important collection of regional and institutional history.
- Veterinary Hospital (HUV): One of the most advanced in the state, providing specialized care for domestic and wild animals.
- Scientific Hubs: The university hosts numerous specialized laboratories for biotechnology, soil science, and food engineering.

== Rankings and Excellence ==
UFLA consistently holds a score of 5 (the maximum grade) in the Brazilian Ministry of Education's institutional evaluations. Internationally, it is featured in the Times Higher Education World University Rankings and the QS World University Rankings, particularly excelling in the field of Agriculture & Forestry.

== See also ==
- List of federal universities of Brazil
- Education in Minas Gerais
