= Ibituruna =

Coordinates: 21°09′S 44°45′W

- Municipality
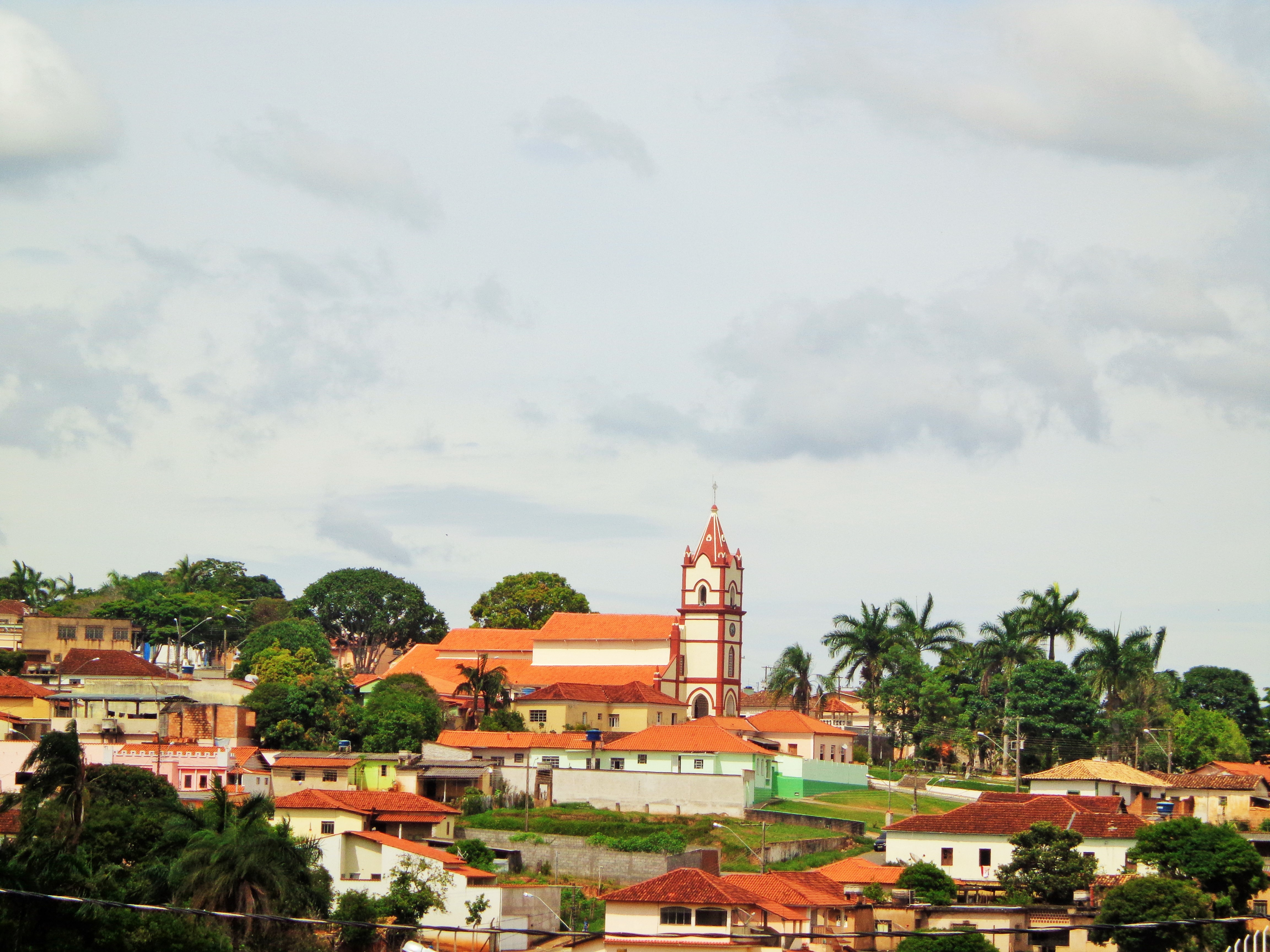

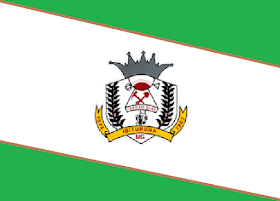
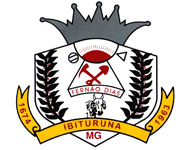
- Flag Coat of arms

- Country: Brazil
- Region: Southeast
- State: Minas Gerais
- Mesoregion: Oeste de Minas

Population (2020)
  - Total: 2,996
- Time zone: UTC−3 (BRT)

Ibituruna is a municipality in the state of Minas Gerais in the Southeast region of Brazil.

== Geography ==
According to IBGE (2017), the municipality is in the Immediate Geographic Region of Lavras, in the Intermediate Geographic Region of Varginha.

=== Ecclesiastical circumscription ===
The municipality is part of the Roman Catholic Diocese of São João del-Rei.

== See also ==
- List of municipalities in Minas Gerais
