= Cana Verde =

Coordinates: 21°01′S 45°11′W

- Municipality
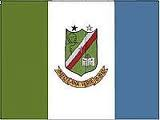
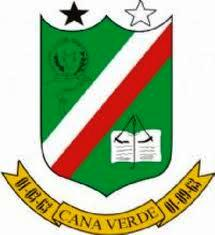
- Flag Coat of arms
- Interactive map of Cana Verde
- Country: Brazil
- Region: Southeast
- State: Minas Gerais
- Mesoregion: Oeste de Minas

Population (2020)
  - Total: 5,594
- Time zone: UTC -3

Cana Verde is a municipality in the state of Minas Gerais in the Southeast region of Brazil.

== See also ==
- List of municipalities in Minas Gerais
