= Itutinga =

Town and municipality in the state of Minas Gerais, Brazil

Coordinates: 21°18′S 44°40′W

- Municipality
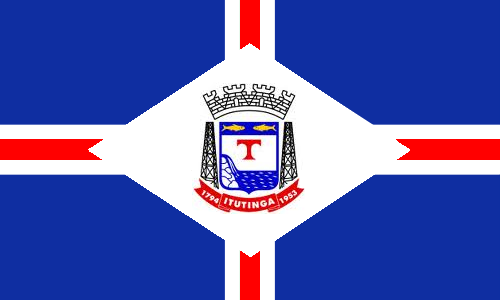
- Flag
- Interactive map of Itutinga
- Country: Brazil
- State: Minas Gerais
- Region: Southeast
- Time zone: UTC−3 (BRT)

Location of Itutinga within Minas Gerais

Itutinga is a Brazilian municipality located in the state of Minas Gerais. The city belongs to the mesoregion of Campo das Vertentes and to the microregion of Lavras. In 2020, the estimated population was 3,768.

== Geography ==
According to IBGE (2017), the municipality is in the Immediate Geographic Region of Lavras, in the Intermediate Geographic Region of Varginha.

=== Ecclesiastical circumscription ===
The municipality is part of the Roman Catholic Diocese of São João del-Rei.

== See also ==
- List of municipalities in Minas Gerais
