= Ingaí =

- Municipality
- Location in the state of Minas Gerais

- Location in Brazil
- Coordinates: 21°24′03″S 44°55′01″W
- Country: Brazil
- Region: Southeast
- State: Minas Gerais
- Mesoregion: Campo das Vertentes

Population (2020)
  - Total: 2,776
- Time zone: UTC−3 (BRT)
- Website: www.ingai.mg.gov.br

Ingaí is a Brazilian municipality located in the state of Minas Gerais. The city belongs to the mesoregion of Campo das Vertentes and to the microregion of Lavras.

== Geography ==
According to IBGE (2017), the municipality is in the Immediate Geographic Region of Lavras, in the Intermediate Geographic Region of Varginha.

=== Ecclesiastical circumscription ===
The municipality is part of the Roman Catholic Diocese of São João del-Rei.

== See also ==
- List of municipalities in Minas Gerais
