= Itumirim =

- Municipality
- Location in the state of Minas Gerais

- Location in Brazil
- Coordinates: 21°19′1″S 44°52′15″W
- Country: Brazil
- Region: Southeast
- State: Minas Gerais
- Mesoregion: Campo das Vertentes

Population (2020)
  - Total: 6,000
- Time zone: UTC−3 (BRT)
- Website: www.itumirim.mg.gov.br

Itumirim is a Brazilian municipality located in the state of Minas Gerais. The city belongs to the mesoregion of Campo das Vertentes and to the microregion of Lavras. As of 2020 it has a population of 6,000. The city has two micro-municipalities inside of it, which are Macuco de Minas and Rosário, which are widely considered to not be different cities.

"Itumirim" is a term of Tupi origin meaning "little waterfall." Currently, As of 2026, the city is creating a legacy through New Years and Carnaval concerts, which give space to local bands to play in front of thousands of people. The duo Maria Cecília e Rodolfo have played here once and it has been the largest concert ever since. It became a municipality by the state Decree Law No. 1058 of December 31, 1943.

== Geography ==
The municipality is in the Immediate Geographic Region of Lavras, in the Intermediate Geographic Region of Varginha.

=== Ecclesiastical circumscription ===
The municipality is part of the Roman Catholic Diocese of São João del-Rei.

== See also ==
- List of municipalities in Minas Gerais
