= Ijaci =

Town and municipality in the state of Minas Gerais, Brazil

Coordinates: 21°10′S 44°56′W

- Municipality
- Interactive map of Ijaci
- Country: Brazil
- State: Minas Gerais
- Region: Southeast
- Time zone: UTC−3 (BRT)

Location of Ijaci within Minas Gerais

Ijaci is a Brazilian municipality located in the south of the state of Minas Gerais. The city belongs to the mesoregion of Campo das Vertentes and to the microregion of Lavras. The population in 2020 was 6,610 in a total area of 105 km^{2} (41 sq mi). The regional center, Lavras lies at a distance of 14 kilometers and is connected by paved highway MG-335.

The main economic activities are milk production and agriculture. Coffee, corn, and manioc are grown.

== Geography ==
According to IBGE (2017), the municipality is in the Immediate Geographic Region of Lavras, in the Intermediate Geographic Region of Varginha.

=== Ecclesiastical circumscription ===
The municipality is part of the Roman Catholic Diocese of São João del-Rei.

== See also ==
- List of municipalities in Minas Gerais
