= Campo das Vertentes (mesoregion) =

Mesoregion of Campo das Vertentes
- Mesoregion
- Location of the Mesoregion of Campo das Vertentes
- Coordinates: 21°13′00″S 43°46′00″W
- Country: Brazil
- Region: Southeast
- State: Minas Gerais

Area
  - Total: 12,563.667 km^{2} (4,850.859 sq mi)

Population (2006/IBGE)
  - Total: 546,007
  - Density: 43.5/km^{2} (113/sq mi)
- Time zone: UTC-3 (BRT)

Campo das Vertentes (transl. Slopes' field) is one of the twelve mesoregions of the Brazilian state of Minas Gerais. It is composed of 36 municipalities, distributed across 3 microregions.
