= Perdões, Minas Gerais =

Perdões
- Municipality
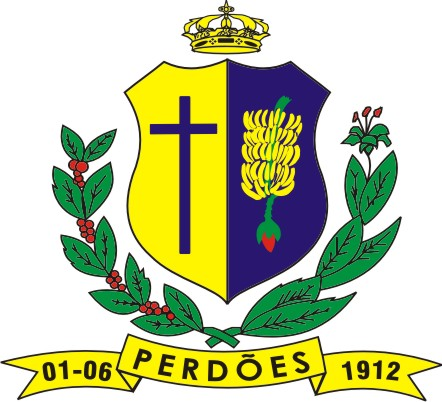
- Coat of arms

- Location in Brazil
- Coordinates: 21°5′27″S 45°5′27″W
- Country: Brazil
- Region: Southeast
- State: Minas Gerais
- Mesoregion: Oeste de Minas

Government
  - Mayor: Hamilton Resende Filho

Population (2020)
  - Total: 21,485
- Time zone: UTC−3 (BRT)

Perdões is a municipality in the state of Minas Gerais in the Southeast region of Brazil.

== See also ==
- List of municipalities in Minas Gerais
