= Consolação =

Consolação may refer to:

- Consolação (district of São Paulo)
- Consolação (São Paulo Metro)
- Consolação, Minas Gerais
- Consolação, Rio de Janeiro
