= Consolação, Minas Gerais =

Consolação
- Municipality
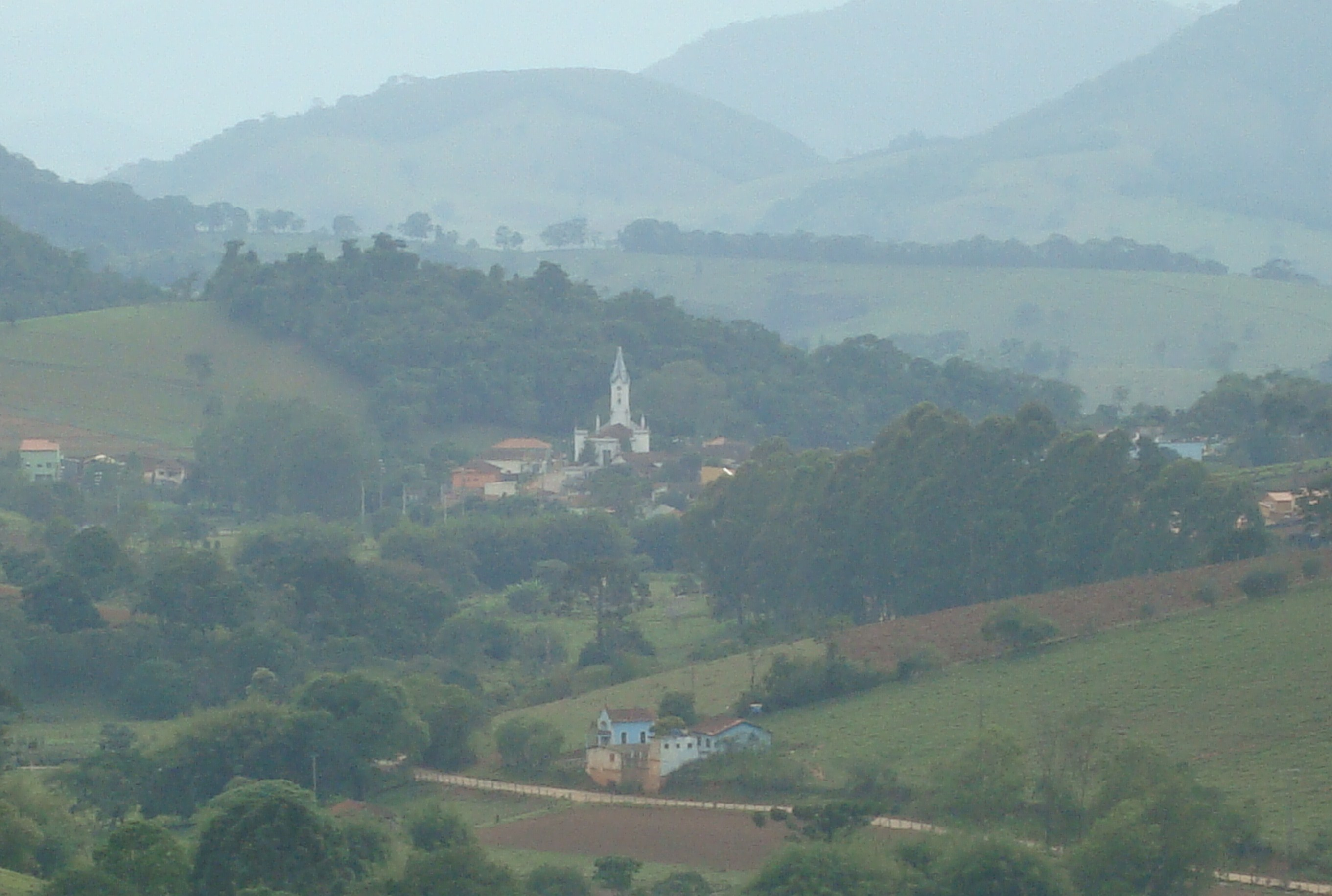
- View of Consolação, Minas Gerais

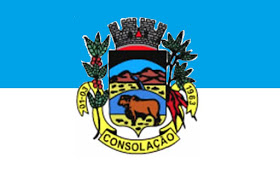
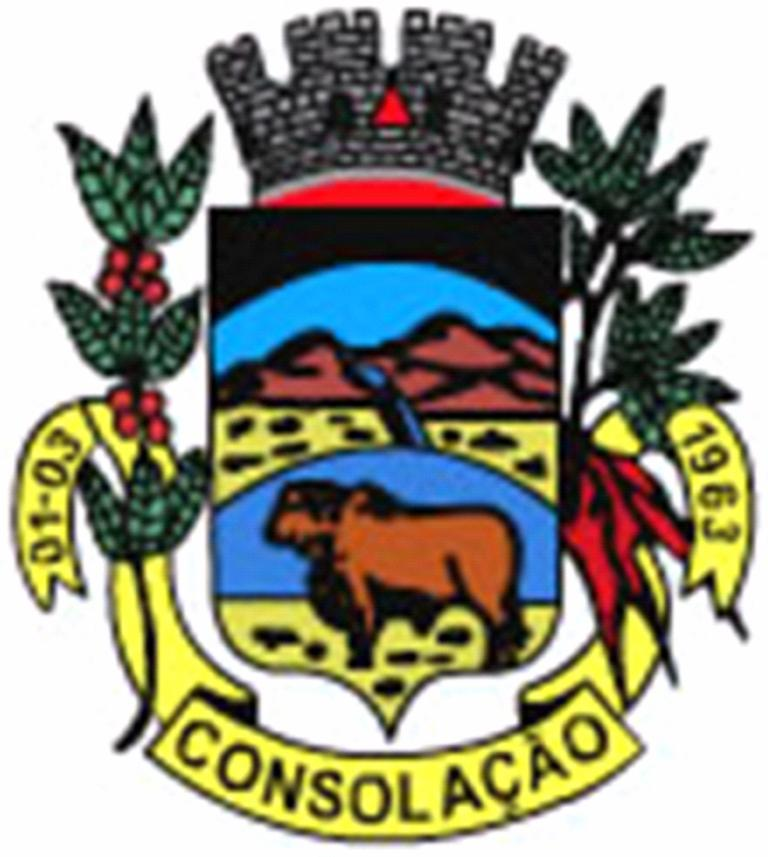
- Flag Coat of arms

- Location in the State of Minas Gerais
- Coordinates: 22°33′03″S 45°55′15″W
- Country: Brazil
- Region: Southeast
- State: Minas Gerais
- Founded: December 30, 1962

Area
  - Total: 85.936 km^{2} (33.180 sq mi)

Population (2020)
  - Total: 1,784
  - Density: 19.7/km^{2} (51/sq mi)
- Time zone: UTC−3 (BRT)
- Postal Code: 37670-000

Consolação is a municipality in Minas Gerais, Brazil.

== See also ==
- List of municipalities in Minas Gerais
