= Bryconops vibex =

Conservation status
- Near Threatened (IUCN 3.1)

Scientific classification
- Kingdom: Animalia
- Phylum: Chordata
- Class: Actinopterygii
- Division: Teleostei
- Order: Characiformes
- Family: Iguanodectidae
- Genus: Bryconops
- Species: B. vibex

Binomial name
- Bryconops vibex Machado-Allison, Chernoff & Buckup, 1996

Species of fish

Bryconops vibex is a species of freshwater ray-finned fish belonging to the family Iguanodectidae. This species is found in Venezuela, where it is known solely from the Rio Cataniapo. The body is slender, though with an element of sturdiness, and it has one humeral spot by each pectoral fin. It bears visual similarities to several congeners, but can be differentiated by way of many factors.

Alongside congener Bryconops humeralis, B. vibex was described in a study in 1996.

== Description ==
Bryconops vibex reaches a maximum of roughly 6.8 cm (2.8 inches) in standard length (excluding the tail fin). This makes it one of the smaller members of the genus Bryconops by a thin margin, though most Bryconops are of comparable length (within ~3cm). The fins are dark-tinted but translucent, and the dorsal half of its caudal fin sports an orange or yellowish ocellus (eyespot). Its scales are silver to silver-green in life, which is not uncommon in the genus, and it bears a single humeral spot by each pectoral fin.

Bryconops vibex is similar to many species in the genus, but there are ways to tell it apart. Its single humeral spot can be used to differentiate it from congeners like B. munduruku and B. inpai, both of which have two humeral spots, or from the likes of B. affinis and B. giacopinii, which have none. Its body is shallower than that of B. cyrtogaster (though still robust), and small factors like a thicker caudal peduncle and a higher number of scales beneath the lateral line differentiate it from sister species B. humeralis.

== Taxonomy ==
Along with ten other species, B. vibex is in the subgenus Creatochanes, making its full name Bryconops (Creatochanes) vibex. It has been considered a member of Bryconops since its description in 1996. The specific name "vibex" is Latin for "mark", referring to the humeral spot; this was of note when B. humeralis and B. vibex were first described, as it was thought that B. inpai was the only other species in the genus to sport any kind of humeral spot at all.

The genus Bryconops as a whole was once considered a member of the family Characidae, which is highly variable and has many genera incertae sedis. However, an in-depth study in 2011 determined by way of phylogeny that Bryconops, along with the genera Iguanodectes and Piabucus, should occupy their own family, Iguanodectidae. (Iguanodectes and Piabucus make up the subfamily Iguanodectinae, while the genus Bryconops is its own monophyletic clade.)

== Distribution and ecology ==
B. vibex was originally described from the Orinoco basin, in Venezuela's Amazonas state, wherein it is relatively common. Specifically, it is known from the Rio Cataniapo, which is a tributary of the Rio Orinoco. The Cataniapo is a somewhat acidic clearwater river, with a pH that ranges from 5.0 to 6.9.

B. vibex has not been the subject of diet-specific study. Based on the habits of other species of Bryconops, however, it is most likely to be an invertivore or an omnivore.

=== Conservation status ===
Bryconops vibex has been evaluated by the IUCN as a near-threatened species; the main danger comes from settlement of nearby farmland. There is documented water quality deterioration in the Rio Cataniapo, including elevated levels of fecal matter and illegal pesticides, which is harmful not only to species like B. vibex but to the human population that relies on the river for their water supply.

An additional threat is the illegal mining scene, which is a booming industry in Latin America as a whole. Though the Rio Cataniapo is not threatened directly by mining activity, Venezuela as a region is dense in mining sites.
