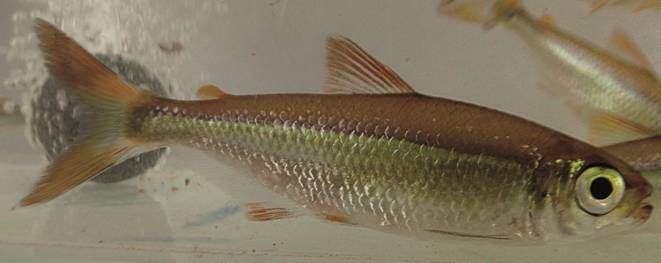

Scientific classification
- Kingdom: Animalia
- Phylum: Chordata
- Class: Actinopterygii
- Order: Characiformes
- Family: Iguanodectidae
- Genus: Bryconops
- Species: B. tocantinensis

Binomial name
- Bryconops tocantinensis Guedes E. F. de Oliveira & Lucinda, 2016

= Bryconops tocantinensis =

Species of fish

Bryconops tocantinensis is a species of freshwater ray-finned fish belonging to the family Iguanodectidae. This species is found in Brazil. It has yellow-gold scales on its back and white scales on its belly, with a bright-silver stripe marking the divide between the two. It gets the name "tocantinensis" from its endemism to the upper Tocantins basin drainage - specifically, the Conceição River.

== Description ==
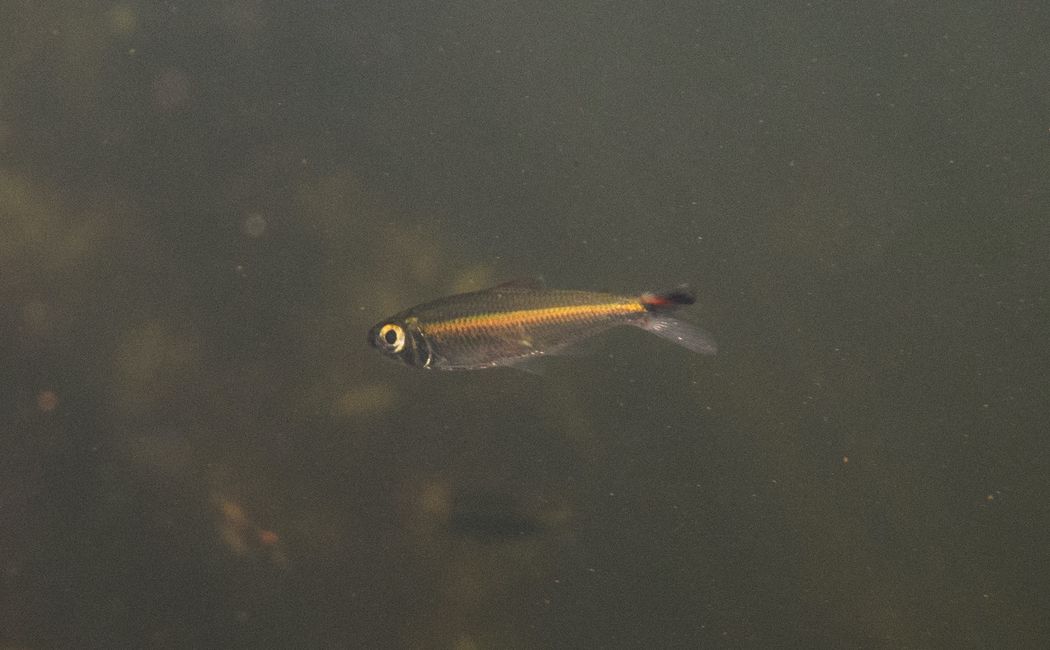
Wild specimen

Bryconops tocantinensis reaches about 6.5 cm (2.6 in) in standard length (excluding the tail fin), which makes it one of the smaller members of the genus. The dorsal, adipose, and caudal fins are all entirely orange, which is a similarity it shares only with congeners B. humeralis and B. vibex. However, it can easily be distinguished from the two because it lacks humeral spots (whereas the others have one on each side) and because it lacks teeth on the maxilla (vs. 1-3 on each side).

The scales on the upper half of the body are a yellow-gold color, with a bright silver lateral stripe marking the divide; the lower half is white-to-silver. The upper portion of the face and head is slightly darker, as are the distal portions of both lobes of the caudal fin. It has 38 to 48 pored lateral line scales; these scales are easily visible, and can be used to distinguish B. tocantinensis from congeners B. vibex and B. rheoruber.

=== Sexual dimorphism ===
Bryconops tocantinensis demonstrates sexual dimorphism in that mature males sport bony hooks on the rays of the anal and pelvic fins. (This is also seen in other members of Bryconops.) Otherwise, they are very morphologically similar to one another, including in coloration (with the exception that larger females may have some orange near the pectoral fin). This includes both in life and when preserved in alcohol.

== Taxonomy ==
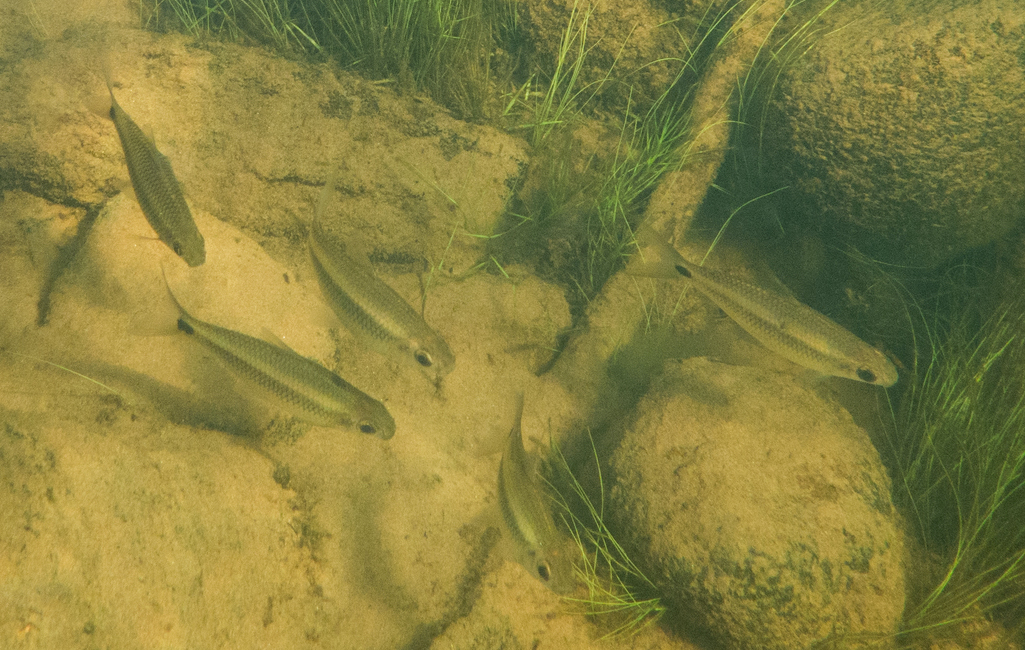
Wild shoal

Since its description in 2016, B. tocantinensis has been considered a member of the subgenus Bryconops due to the lack of teeth on its maxillaries. There are nine other species classified as such alongside it. The other subgenus in Bryconops, Creatochanes, is characterized by having 1 to 3 teeth on either side of the maxillary.

== Habitat and distribution ==
Bryconops tocantinensis is known only from the rio Conceição, a tributary of the rio Palma, which is a part of the upper rio Tocantins drainage. The specific epithet "tocantinensis" is in reference to this. (The suffix -ensis denotes being found in a specific location; compare Lynx canadensis, the Canada lynx, or Callopistria floridensis, the Florida fern moth.)

The Rio Conceição itself is a clearwater river with a depth of up to 1.5 m (5 ft). The substrate is a mixture of sand and stones. There is adequate riparian vegetation, largely in the form of trees and shrubs.

== Diet and ecology ==
Though few dietary specifics are known of B. tocantinensis, it is likely to be an insectivore or omnivore, as is common in the genus Bryconops. The presence of riparian vegetation in its natural habitat offers the possibility that it eats insects that fall into the water from trees overhead, as is seen in congeners B. inpai and B. magoi.

It is known to live peacefully with various other freshwater fish in its native range. Examples include Eigenmannia trilineata, Hoplerythrinus unitaeniatus, Astyanax goyacensis, species of Knodus (specifically Knodus breviceps), and species of Ancistrus (bristlenose catfishes).

== Conservation status ==
Bryconops tocantinensis has not been evaluated by the IUCN. Nonetheless, the Tocantins basin at large is under anthropogenic threat, which may place it under greater survival pressure. The Rio Tocantins main already has many hydroelectric dams along its length, and more are planned for the future. Deforestation and logging are also among the current means of habitat destruction, which has a significantly negative impact on the riparian zone.
