= Bryconops allisoni =

Scientific classification
- Kingdom: Animalia
- Phylum: Chordata
- Class: Actinopterygii
- Order: Characiformes
- Family: Iguanodectidae
- Genus: Bryconops
- Species: B. allisoni

Binomial name
- Bryconops allisoni Silva-Oliveira, Canto & F. R. V. Ribeiro, 2019

Species of fish

Bryconops allisoni is a small species of freshwater ray-finned fish belonging to the family Iguanodectidae. This fish is found in rivers of Brazil. It is a recent addition to the genus (2019), currently considered a member incertae sedis. Its name honors Antonio Machado-Allison, an ichthyologist responsible for a great deal of work on the genus Bryconops.

== Description ==
The holotype, or first collected specimen, of Bryconops allisoni was 7.25 cm SL (standard length). Other collected specimens range from 2.76 to 6.86 cm. This makes it slightly smaller than other members of the genus, which usually range from 6 to 8 cm SL. The body is generally slender, deepest in the region of the dorsal fin, and the snout is relatively long, about 23-29% of the length of the head.

The scales of B. allisoni are silvery with a greenish iridescence, and parts of the snout are tinted brown. (Silver or greenish coloration is not uncommon in the genus as a whole.) It bears an iridescent-green lateral stripe that turns black when it advances onto the caudal fin, and the caudal fin also has a red blotch of pigment just above this stripe; the dorsal fin may have a spot of red, and the adipose fin is red entirely. The pelvic, anal, and dorsal fins are almost completely clear with scattered chromatophores (color cells).

The presence of a stripe on the caudal peduncle on the caudal fin is a feature shared with B. chernoffi, B. inpai, and B. melanurus, but various factors differentiate said species. In B. inpai and B. melanurus, the stripe is longer, advancing onto the dorsal lobe of the caudal fin, and B. allisoni has more predorsal scales than B. chernoffi (10-12 vs. 8–9, respectively).

=== Sexual dimorphism ===
Mature males of B. allisoni are equipped with bony hooks on select fin-rays. This is a feature seen in many other members of Bryconops, though the specific appearance may vary depending on the species, sometimes more accurately being described as barbs or spines; for instance, hooks are well-defined on the anal fin of congener B. munduruku, but there are smaller spines on munduruku's dorsal and pelvic fins. Otherwise, there are no documented morphometric or coloration differences between males and females.

== Taxonomy ==
Bryconops allisoni has been considered a member of the genus Bryconops since its description in 2019. There are two subgenera in Bryconops, Bryconops and Creatochanes, and B. allisoni exhibits synapomorphies of both; multicuspid teeth on both maxillae and well-denticulated gill rakers from Creatochanes, but a shorter jaw structure associated with Bryconops. Therefore, B. allisoni's subgeneric status is yet undetermined. It is still considered a member of the genus Bryconops incertae sedis.

The specific name "allisoni" is in honor of Venezuelan ichthyologist Antonio Machado-Allison, who has written or co-authored a large amount of literature concerning the taxonomy of Bryconops.

== Distribution and ecology ==
Bryconops allisoni is only known from the lower rio Tapajós, appearing solely in small, right-bank tributaries. It is the most recent species described therein; excluding B. allisoni, there are thought to be at least nine species cited from the middle and lower Tapajós basin. The congener B. munduruku specifically was also originally described from a right-bank tributary of the Tapajós, and B. allisoni occurs syntopically with congener B. melanurus.

=== Conservation status ===
Bryconops allisoni has not been evaluated by the IUCN. Based on patterns seen in other members of the genus, it may be under threat of various anthropogenic hazards, including illegal mining and farmland settlement. The Tapajós main has been subject to such intense mining activity in the past that portions of it have turned entirely brown due to sediment addition and disturbance. However, its type locality, the Corredor Ecológico stream, is a tributary of the Tapaós located in the Tapajos National Forest, a large area of protected land. Therefore, there are already measures in place that may aid in its survival as a species.
