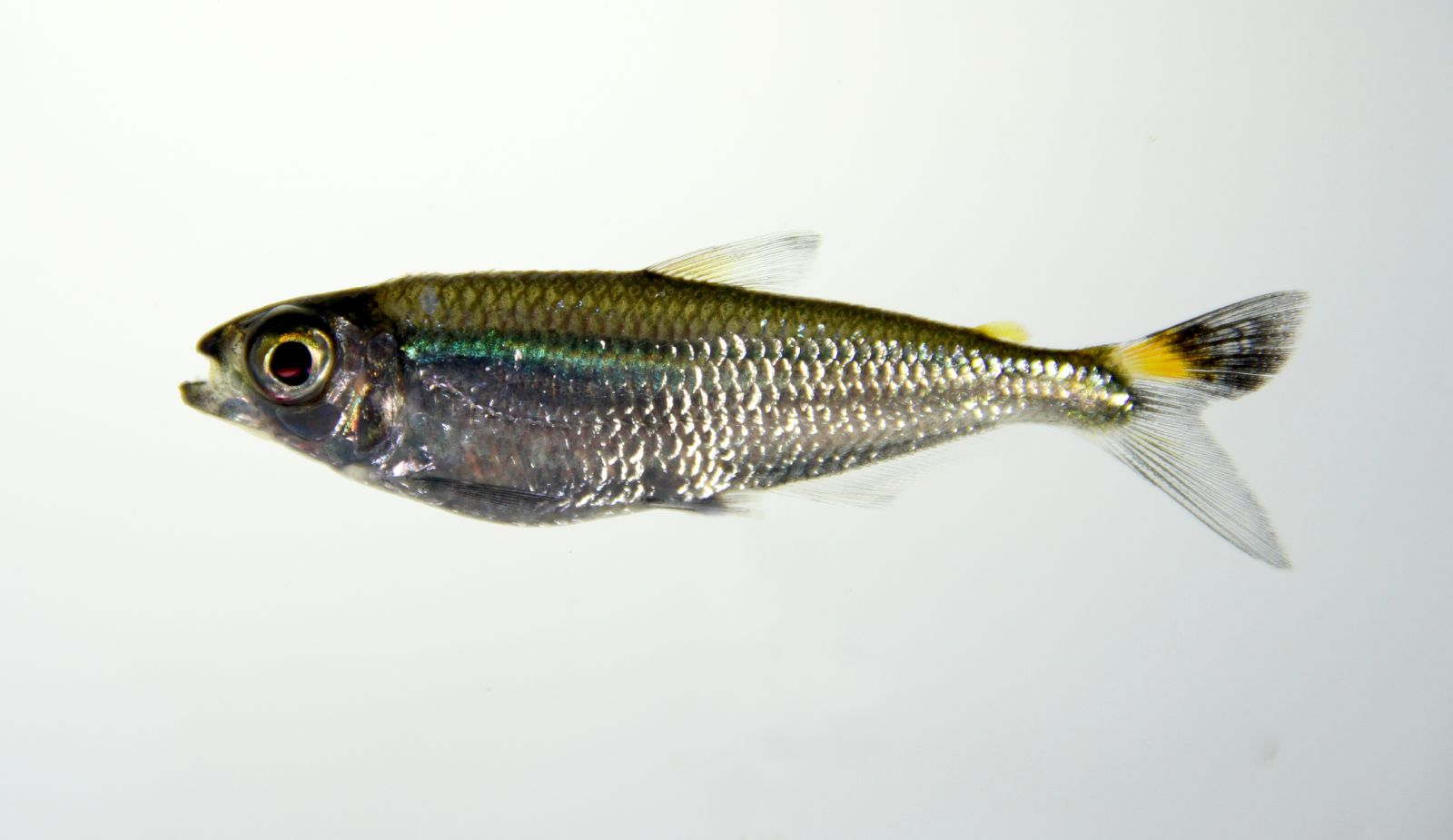
- Bryconops caudomaculatus

Scientific classification
- Kingdom: Animalia
- Phylum: Chordata
- Class: Actinopterygii
- Order: Characiformes
- Family: Iguanodectidae
- Genus: Bryconops; Kner, 1858

Type species
- Bryconops alburnoides Kner, 1858

Synonyms
- Creatochanes Günther, 1864; Brycochandus C. H. Eigenmann, 1908; Autanichthys Fernández-Yépez, 1950

= Bryconops =

Genus of fishes

Bryconops is a genus of freshwater ray-finned fish in the family Iguanodectidae from South America. It consists of small fish, all under half-a-foot long, with slender bodies and silvery scales, though there is some mild color variation. Several species can be identified by way of a humeral patch (a mark near the pectoral fin), and others have a reddish ocellus, or eyespot, on one or both lobes of the dorsal fin.

Many Bryconops prefer clearwater environments with a strong current, though some are partial to slow-moving blackwater, and several are endemic to their locale. The majority of species are from Brazil or Venezuela. Rivers and river basins that house species of Bryconops include the Tapajos, Orinoco, Tocantins, Negro, and Madeira.

Few species of Bryconops have been evaluated as far as conservation status, but most of them are believed to be low-risk species. The greatest threats to population levels come almost entirely in the form of anthropogenic hazards, including mining, dam construction, farmland settlement, and destruction of the riparian zone. Nonetheless, several species are found in areas of protected forest, which decreases some of the survival pressure.

== Description ==
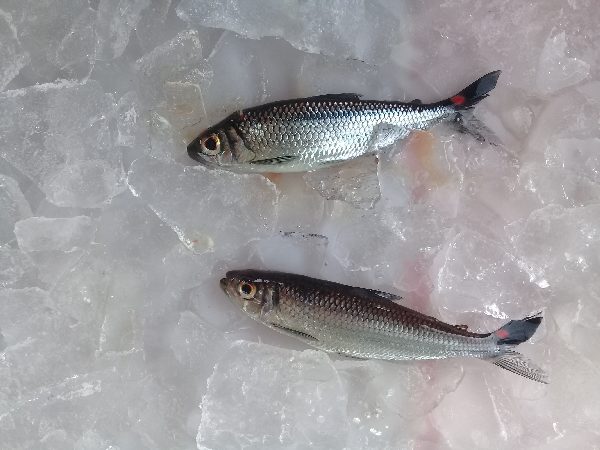
Captured specimens of Bryconops giacopinii

Members of Bryconops are fairly small, reaching just under half a foot at a maximum. B. durbini, the smallest, reaches 3.1 cm (1.2 in) SL (standard length, without the tail fin included), and B. giacopinii, the largest, reaches 18 cm (7.1 in) TL (total length, with the tail fin included). They are slender, somewhat compressed and elongate, described as "spindle-shaped". The mouth is often terminal. Certain morphological consistencies within the genus have contributed to its accepted status as a monophyletic clade, though said monophyly remains somewhat unclear, and is largely based on shared physical traits.

Bryconops are most often silver or some shade therein, sometimes with a darker back and/or a greenish tint. Only three species - B. inpai, B. marabaixo, and B. sapezal - have a hint of blue in their scales. There is great variety in fin coloration, though they are most often some blend of hyaline, red, and dusky-gray; some species, like B. caudomaculatus (the tailspot tetra) bear an ocellus, or eyespot, on the dorsal lobe of the caudal fin. Other species, like B. affinis, have an ocellus on both lobes, nearly symmetrical. The only two species to have a dark dorsal fin are B. chernoffi and B. piracolina. It is uncommon, but not unheard of, for members of Bryconops to have a humeral mark, which is a spot of pigment near the dorsal fin (occasionally two spots).

The scales are cycloid, usually taller than they are wide. Most members of the genus have fairly well-defined radii on the scales; these are slightly more subdued in B. affinis. The scales of the lateral line are pored, but the number of pored scales varies wildly from species to species, anywhere from 9 to 61. Even within a single species, B. disruptus, the range is from 9 to 23. The pored scales either do or do not extend to the hypural plate, the plate that joins the fish's tail to its body, and this is a feature that can be used to tell species apart (such as B. caudomaculatus, whose pored lateral scales stop at the hypural plate, versus B. magoi and B. collettei, whose pored lateral scales extend 2-3 scales beyond that).

== Taxonomy ==
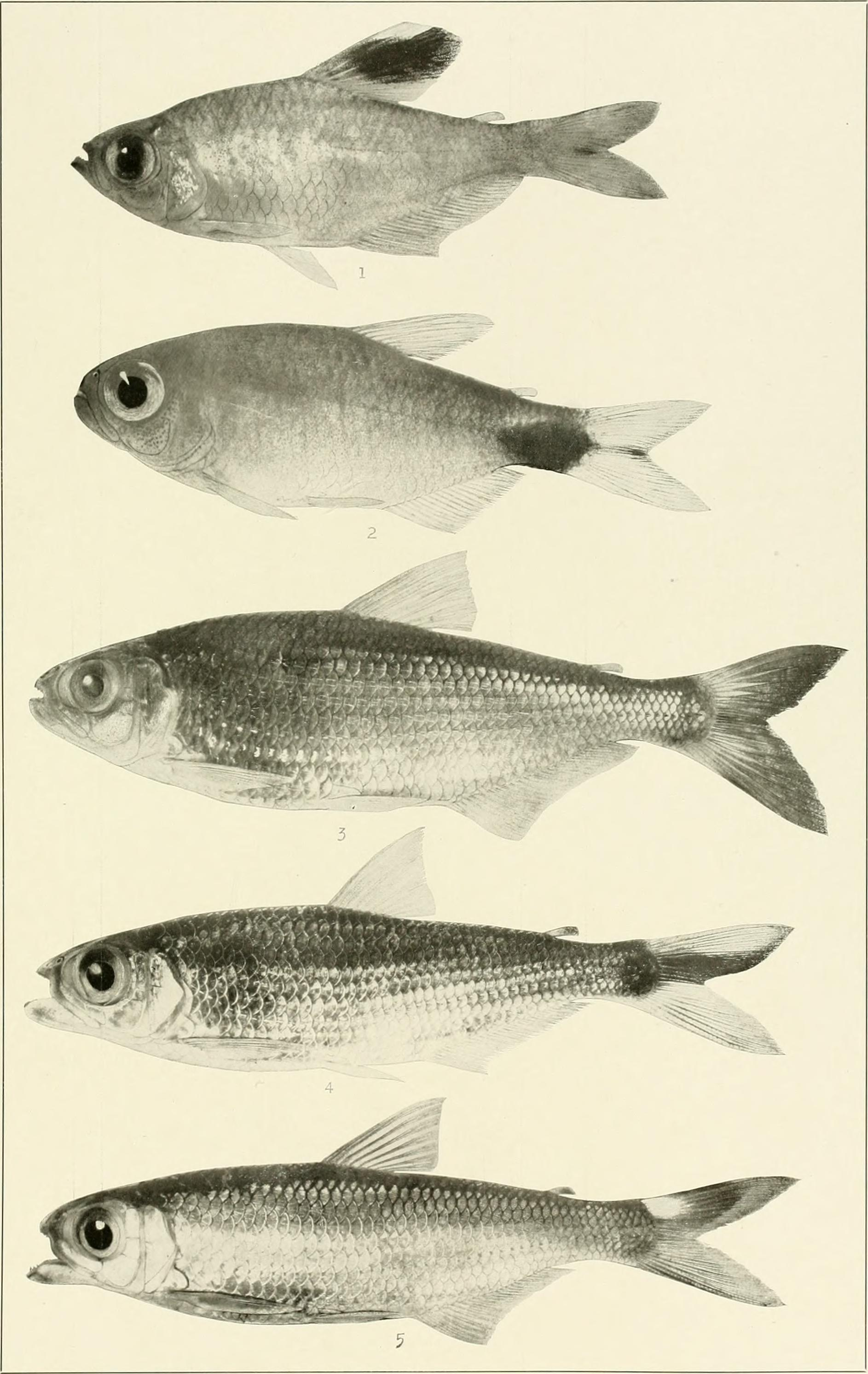
The three lower fishes in this image are species of Bryconops, though considered species of Creatochanes at the time (1912). From the middle downwards, they are Bryconops affinis, Bryconops melanurus, and Bryconops caudomaculatus.

Bryconops was long considered to belong to the family Characidae incertae sedis. It is still listed there by some resources, such as ADW and ITIS. Characidae is an enormously varied family, with many genera in a similar position. However, research in 2011 examined morphological and phylogenetic evidence, and prompted taxonomists to move Bryconops to a different family, Iguanodectidae. This was also done to keep Characidae monophyletic.

The genera Piabucus and Iguanodectes are in Iguanodectidae as well, and were also moved based on the 2011 research. Piabucus and Iguanodectes come together to make up a subfamily, Iguanodectinae; Bryconops is considered its own monophyletic clade. The family Iguanodectidae is a revival from some of the works of Carl H. Eigenmann, a prolific German-American ichthyologist.

Bryconops has two subgenera: Bryconops and Creatochanes. The latter was considered its own standalone genus before being synonymized with Bryconops and turned into a subgenus in 1999. Members of Bryconops usually have no teeth to either side of the maxillary, or a single conical tooth on one side. Creatochanes, in contrast, is characterized partially by the presence of 1-3 teeth to both sides of the maxillary. Another difference is in the length of the maxillary bone; in Bryconops, it does not reach the junction of the second and third infraorbital bones, but in Creatochanes it does. A third difference is in the ossification and denticulation of the gill rakers, which is strong in Creatochanes and poor in Bryconops. Creatochanes is the more speciose of the two.

Altogether, there are 27 recognized species in the genus Bryconops. This makes it the largest genus in its family; Iguanodectes has 8, and Piabucus has 3. It continues to grow into the 21st century, with new species having been described as recently as 2019 (B. hexalepis), 2020 (B. marabaixo), and 2021 (B. florenceae).

== Species ==
Bryconops contains the following valid species:

- Bryconops affinis (Günther, 1864) (Orangefin tetra)
- Bryconops alburnoides Kner, 1858
- Bryconops allisoni Silva-Oliveira, Canto & F. R. V. Ribeiro, 2019
- Bryconops caudomaculatus (Günther, 1864) (Tailspot tetra)
- Bryconops chernoffi C. S. de Oliveira, Lima & Bogotá-Gregory, 2018
- Bryconops colanegra Chernoff & Machado-Allison, 1999
- Bryconops colaroja Chernoff & Machado-Allison, 1999
- Bryconops collettei Chernoff & Machado-Allison, 2005
- Bryconops cyrtogaster (Norman, 1926)
- Bryconops disruptus Machado-Allison & Chernoff, 1997
- Bryconops durbini (C. H. Eigenmann, 1908)
- Bryconops florenceae C. S. de Oliveira, Ota, Sabaj & Py-Daniel, 2021
- Bryconops giacopinii (Fernández-Yépez, 1950)
- Bryconops gracilis (C. H. Eigenmann, 1908)
- Bryconops hexalepis Guedes, E. F. de Oliveira & Lucinda, 2019
- Bryconops humeralis Machado-Allison, Chernoff & Buckup, 1996
- Bryconops imitator Machado-Allison & Chernoff, 2002
- Bryconops inpai Knöppel, Junk & Géry, 1968
- Bryconops magoi Machado-Allison & Chernoff, 2005
- Bryconops marabaixo C. S. de Oliveira, Moreira, Lima & Py-Daniel, 2020
- Bryconops melanurus (Bloch, 1794)
- Bryconops munduruku C. S. de Oliveira, Canto & F. R. V. Ribeiro, 2015
- Bryconops piracolina Wingert & L. R. Malabarba, 2011
- Bryconops rheoruber C. S. de Oliveira, Ota, Sabaj & Py-Daniel, 2019
- Bryconops sapezal Wingert, Chuctaya & Malabarba, 2018
- Bryconops tocantinensis Guedes, E. F. de Oliveira & Lucinda, 2016
- Bryconops transitoria (Steindachner, 1915)
- Bryconops vibex Machado-Allison, Chernoff & Buckup, 1996

=== History ===
Upon describing Bryconops alburnoides in 1858, Austrian ichthyologist Rudolf Kner established Bryconops as a new genus. Kner also offered a description of new congener B. lucidus, which has since been synonymized with B. alburnoides. In 1910, German-American ichthyologist Carl H. Eigenmann designated Bryconops alburnoides the type species of the genus. Technically, the earliest member of the genus to be described is Bryconops melanurus, which was originally classified as Salmo melanurus by German naturalist Marcus Elieser Bloch in the year 1764.

=== Etymology ===
The genus name Bryconops originates from the genus Brycon and the Greek suffix "-ops", which means "appearance" or "resemblance". This is because Kner noted visual similarities between members of the two genera upon description. In turn, the genus name Brycon originates from the Greek "bryko", which means "to bite" or "to devour". Fish of the genus Brycon are equipped with a full set of teeth on their maxillaries, making for an apt name.

Many of the specific names in Bryconops originate with aspects of the species' appearances. For instance, "caudomaculatus" means "tail spot", for the distinct caudal ocellus on B. caudomaculatus. Other epithets originate in specific people, such as B. allisoni (Venezuelan ichthyologist Antonio Machado-Allison), B. chernoffi (American ichthyologist Barry Chernoff), and B. magoi (Francisco Mago-Leccia, considered the pioneer of Venezuelan ichthyology). A few species are named after specific locations, such as B. tocantinensis, which earned its specific epithet from its likely restriction to the upper Tocantins basin. Another example is B. sapezal, from its type locale of the Sapezal municipality in Brazil. Some species names take after cultural or historical significance from the type locality, like B. munduruku, after an indigenous tribe, or B. marabaixo, after a religious and historical festival of the same name.

== Habitat and distribution ==
All members of Bryconops are restricted to the northern half of South America, where they occupy various river basins and tributaries of major rivers. Their distribution is quite wide as a genus, though individual species display some endemism (such as the cases of B. piracolina, restricted to the creek of its namesake, and B. chernoffi, to the Rio Ipixuna). Specific rivers known to host various species of Bryconops include the Tapajós, Orinoco, Negro, Casiquiare, and Madeira.

Members of Bryconops have varying preferences when it comes to specific environments, though they generally fall into one of two categories - those that inhabit blackwater, and those that inhabit fast-moving clearwater. Examples of the former include B. disruptus, B. humeralis, and B. colaroja. Examples of the latter include B. rheoruber, B. sapezal, and B. florenceae. Several members are found in both environments despite the contrast, such as B. collettei and B. caudomaculatus.

The lattermost species, B. caudomaculatus, demonstrates varying body composition based upon where it lives (a fast-moving creek versus a still lagoon). Examination based upon physical aspects can correctly classify at least 75% of any given specimens' habitats. More of the body weight is shifted backwards for tailspot tetras that live in lagoon habitats, and the mouth is slightly more upturned for channel-dwelling tetras. It is unknown if similar morphology changes affect other members of the genus.

== Ecology and diet ==
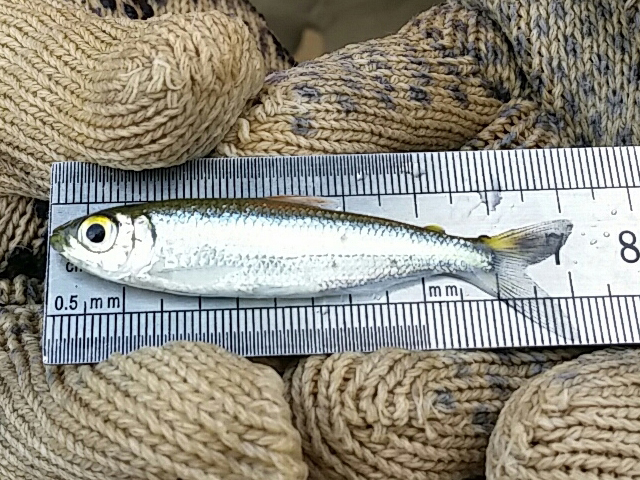
Captured specimen of Bryconops alburnoides

Species of Bryconops are known to live peacefully amongst other species of fish, as well as syntopically with other members of Bryconops. They frequently form schools midstream regardless of species. The exception to this may be B. caudomaculatus, which has a reputation for being "quarrelsome", though it does spawn in schools.

Not only are members of Bryconops a food source for larger fish, but they are also notably preyed upon by parasites. In 2011, B. caudomaculatus was discovered to be the host for a new species of trematode (parasitic flatworm), Auriculostoma foliaceum (which is currently accepted as Creptotrema foliaceum). B. affinis is frequently subject to infestation by gill parasites of the genus Jainus (not to be confused with the sawfly genus Janus).

=== Reproduction ===
Little is known of general reproduction habits for Bryconops, but there is limited research on species-specific behaviors. For instance, B. caudomaculatus is known to spawn in schools during monsoon season. B. affinis is a batch spawner, releasing batches of eggs in a gradual manner as opposed to all at once, and the eggs are adhesive, though this is not the result of an additional substance secreted alongside them; a layer of the outer membrane of the egg, called the zona pediculla, displays specialized microscopic structural aspects during formation that play a role. It prefers to spawn in schools, hidden between plants.

=== Diet ===
Many members of Bryconops are invertivores, largely with a preference for terrestrial insects. For instance, B. inpai and B. magoi both live in areas with dense riparian vegetation, which means that insects frequently fall into the water from above, generating a consistent food source. B. alburnoides picks insects from the riverbanks, though it does take advantage of wind or rain that sweep food into the water. B. caudomaculatus eats the aquatic larval forms of its prey, but will also actively leap from the water to target flying insects, especially during twilight hours.

Though largely invertivores, several members of Bryconops are omnivores that take supplemental plant material, like B. inpai and B. affinis. B. caudomaculatus is known to eat plants as well, and includes smaller fish in its diet. B. collettei is thought to be an herbivore.

== Conservation status ==
Though not all members have been evaluated, members of Bryconops are largely thought to be of least concern or near threatened by the IUCN. Almost all threats come in the form of environmental anthropogenic hazards, including farmland settlement, illegal mining, dam construction, and riparian zone destruction.

Species in the Rio Tapajós in particular are under greater survival pressure due to environmental disturbance as a result of illegal mining. The illegal mining sector is enormous in Latin America as a whole, despite its risks to both participants and the environment, and can have disastrous results, such as mercury poisoning affecting the people and wildlife involved. At one point, there was such heavy sediment disturbance and deposition that entire portions of the Tapajós turned entirely brown. The Tapajós is also often targeted for infrastructure development, though considerations have been taken in recent times in the context of environmental preservation.

Species from the Tocantins basin are largely pressured by the construction of hydroelectric dams, which greatly alter the flow of water and present new environmental hazards. This is also the case for species native to the Xingu, which is home to the world's third-largest hydroelectric dam, the Belo Monte dam. Some species are adaptable, and can survive in the subsequent altered environments.

Destruction and disturbance of the riparian zone (the interface between water and land) is another factor that could trouble various species of Bryconops. Deforestation and logging have a negative impact, removing food sources and shelter from the elements. Settlement of the surrounding land for use in farms causes a marked decrease in water quality, including factors like pesticide use and fecal contamination.

=== Presence in aquaria ===
Data is limited, as species of Bryconops are not in particularly high demand from aquarists, but several species have a presence in the fish-keeping community, and are known to be deported from their native habitats for use therein.

- B. colanegra and B. colaroja are taken from the wild, though not in numbers great enough to be concerning.
- B. melanurus is exported from Peru and has a presence in hobbyist communities. Still, it tends to fare poorly in tank settings.
- B. cyrtogaster is likely taken from the wild for use in the aquarium industry. Details are sparse.
- B. caudomaculatus is taken from the wild in multiple countries, and remains common in many areas thanks to its hardy nature.
- B. affinis is of definite interest to hobbyists, but extensive research has not been done regarding its popularity or export.
