= Bryconops rheoruber =

Scientific classification
- Kingdom: Animalia
- Phylum: Chordata
- Class: Actinopterygii
- Order: Characiformes
- Family: Iguanodectidae
- Genus: Bryconops
- Species: B. rheoruber

Binomial name
- Bryconops rheoruber Silva-Oliveira, Sabaj, Ota & Py-Daniel, 2019

Species of fish

Bryconops rheoruber is a species of freshwater ray-finned fish belonging to the family Iguanodectidae. This species is found in Brazil. Its back scales are tan-to-cream, and its belly is silvery; the divide between the two colors is marked by a broad iridescent-silver stripe. Its fins are a mixture of pale, clear, and reddish, which contributed to its specific name. "Rheo" means "flow" or "current" in Greek, and "ruber" means "red" in Latin.

It was first described from the rapids of the Rio Xingu (hence "rheo" in its scientific name), and its range is known to extend into the Rio Iriri, the largest tributary therein. Like many other species of Bryconops, it prefers fast-flowing waters over a rocky or sandy substrate.

== Description ==
Bryconops rheoruber ranges from 4.61 to 5.49 cm in standard length. This makes it smaller than most Bryconops, members of which are largely between 6 and 8 cm long. It is deep-chested, with its deepest body section just before the dorsal fin, and it has 8–9 pre-dorsal scales; the latter is a feature it only shares with B. marabaixo and B. chernoffi. Unlike several other species of Bryconops, B. rheoruber lacks a humeral spot (a mark near either pectoral fin). Many fish in Bryconops have either one humeral spot or two.

Bryconops rheoruber has a broad, iridescent-silver lateral stripe that turns lead-gray when a deceased specimen is preserved in alcohol. The scales themselves are tan-to-cream dorsally and silver ventrally in life, with all scales turning pale-yellow upon preservation. Some specimens may have an isolated blotch of pigment upon the distal portion of the caudal fin's dorsal lobe; this is superficially similar to coloration seen in congener B. florenceae, though in B. florenceae the pigmentation is limited to the base of the dorsal lobe and the distal regions are left pale.

The other fins are somewhat varied in coloration. The dorsal fin may have a diffuse, red crescent arching backwards from the center of the base to the outer fin-rays, which leaves a half-oval patch of hyaline dorsal fin near the base, and the tip is whitish. The adipose fin is red. The dorsal half of the caudal fin has a diffuse red ocellus (eyespot) near the base, terminating about midway down the lobe, and the tip of both lobes therein is dusky, sometimes with a darkly-pigmented dorsal tip. The anal, pelvic, and pectoral fins are mostly hyaline (clear).

=== Sexual dimorphism ===
Mature males of B. rheoruber sport bony hooks on the rays of the anal and pelvic fins. These hooks are pointed back towards the body. Many members of Bryconops display similar hooks or spines, though appearance varies based on species.

== Taxonomy ==
There are two subgenera in Bryconops, Bryconops and Creatochanes. B. rheoruber has been considered a member of subgenus Bryconops since its description in 2019, based on the fact that its maxillaries lack teeth or have a single conical tooth isolated to either side. Members of Creatochanes are partially characterized by having one to three teeth on both sides, and also by factors like jaw length and the bones surrounding the eyes.

=== Etymology ===
"Rheo" means "flow" or "current" in Greek, and "ruber" means "red" in Latin (compare the word "ruby"); respectively, these reflect B. rheoruber's preference for waters with a strong current, and the red coloration prominent in various fins.

When originally named, B. rheoruber was named B. rheorubrum. However, this was changed to be "rheoruber" because the genus name "Bryconops" is considered masculine by Latin gender rules, and convention states that the species and genus name match genders. "Rheorubrum" would be spelled "rheoruber" when paired with the masculine genus name.

== Habitat and ecology ==
Bryconops rheoruber was originally collected from the clearwater rapids of the Rio Xingu (pronounced sheen-GOO), and is also native to the Rio Iriri, the largest tributary of the Rio Xingu. Its natural habitat classifies it as "rheophilic", a word meaning "living in flowing water or strong current".

This preference for clearwater rapids is demonstrated by other members of Bryconops, even those that are not found in the Xingu. Examples include B. piracolina, from the Igarape Piracolina; B. tocantinensis, from the Rio Conceição; B. caudomaculatus, from the Orinoco and Amazon River basins; and B. magoi, from the rivers of Venezuela.

=== Conservation status ===
Bryconops rheoruber has not been evaluated by the IUCN. Nonetheless, there are various factors affecting its surrounding environment that may both help and hinder its survival as a species. The Rio Xingu has been subjected to various infrastructure projects over the years, the most prominent of which was the construction of the Belo Monte Dam, the world's third-largest hydroelectric dam. This significantly altered the flow of the rapids in regions of the Xingu, threatening the environments therein.

The establishment of the Xingu Indigenous Park, created in 1961, has helped to protect the territory not only of various endemic fish species, but also of various cultures and peoples that have lived in the area dating back to the 1200s. The Nascentes da Serra do Cachimbo Biological Reserve, established in 2005, encompasses a great deal of the Rio Iriri.
