= Bryconops humeralis =

Conservation status
- Least Concern (IUCN 3.1)

Scientific classification
- Kingdom: Animalia
- Phylum: Chordata
- Class: Actinopterygii
- Order: Characiformes
- Family: Iguanodectidae
- Genus: Bryconops
- Species: B. humeralis

Binomial name
- Bryconops humeralis Chernoff, Machado-Allison & Buckup, 1996

Species of fish

Bryconops humeralis is a species of freshwater ray-finned fish belonging to the family Iguanodectidae. This species is found in northern South America. The name "humeralis" means "relating to the shoulder" (to the humerus), in reference to the distinct humeral patches that the fish sports. It is slightly longer than average in terms of the genus Bryconops, though still firmly within the standard range, and is slightly more slender than is usual for its congeners.

Along with Bryconops vibex, B. humeralis was described by Chernoff, Machado-Allison and Buckup in 1996 from the Orinoco River Basin in Venezuela. It is known to be an invertivore - that is, primarily consuming invertebrates (largely insects).

== Description ==
Bryconops humeralis reaches a maximum of roughly 8.6 cm (3.4 in) in standard length, though averages closer to 7.5 cm (3.0 in). In comparison to other members of Bryconops, it is close to the middle of the size range, if slightly above in larger specimens. Its body is on the shallow side, which can help differentiate it from several of its congeners. Its scales are largely silvery in color, its fins are dark-tinted but translucent, and the dorsal half of its caudal fin sports an orange or yellowish ocellus (eyespot).

The specific epithet originates from the presence of a distinct humeral patch near each of B. humeralis's pectoral fins, which are its main distinguishing trait. This is a marking it shares with a few of its congeners, but other features can be used to tell them apart; for instance, B. inpai and B. munduruku have a pair of humeral marks by each fin as opposed to just one in B. humeralis. B. vibex and B. marabaixo have single humeral patches (as opposed to paired), but other features distinguish them from B. humeralis, such as number of scales beneath the lateral line (B. humeralis has fewer than B. vibex) and body shape (B. marabaixo has a deeper body than B. humeralis, more reminiscent of B. inpai).

== Classification ==
Bryconops humeralis has retained its designation as a member of Bryconops since its description in 1996. The genus Bryconops has two subgenera, Bryconops and Creatochanes, and B. humeralis is considered a member of Creatochanes, which makes its full name Bryconops (Creatochanes) humeralis. This sub-classification is based on the fact that it has at least one maxillary tooth on both sides of the mouth, which is the main characterizing facet of Creatochanes.

Bryconops and its sister genera Piabucus and Iguanodectes are considered members of the relatively recent family Iguanodectidae, which was named in research by Oliveria et al. (2011). As a result, some resources (such as ITIS and ADW) still list B. humeralis as a member of the family Characidae, which is where Bryconops was previously classified. Nonetheless, its modern placement is with the rest of Bryconops (under Iguanodectidae).

== Distribution and ecology ==
Like other members of its genus, B. humeralis is found solely in northern South America. It was first recognized from the Orinoco Basin in Venezuela, and its range has since been established as encompassing the Orinoco, Negro, and Casiquiare rivers. Its affinity for blackwater habitats, such as the Rio Negro, indicates that it does not have high-oxygen needs; this is because blackwater habitats are low in oxygen, as microbes consume all available dissolved oxygen in the water. (Microbial decay is responsible for blackwater conditions; the breakdown of organic material releases trapped tannins into the environment.)

Though extensive research has not been performed on B. humeralis's diet, it is known to prey on invertebrates. This is a similarity it shares with most other species of Bryconops (though some are documented herbivores).

Bryconops humeralis has not been evaluated by the IUCN.
