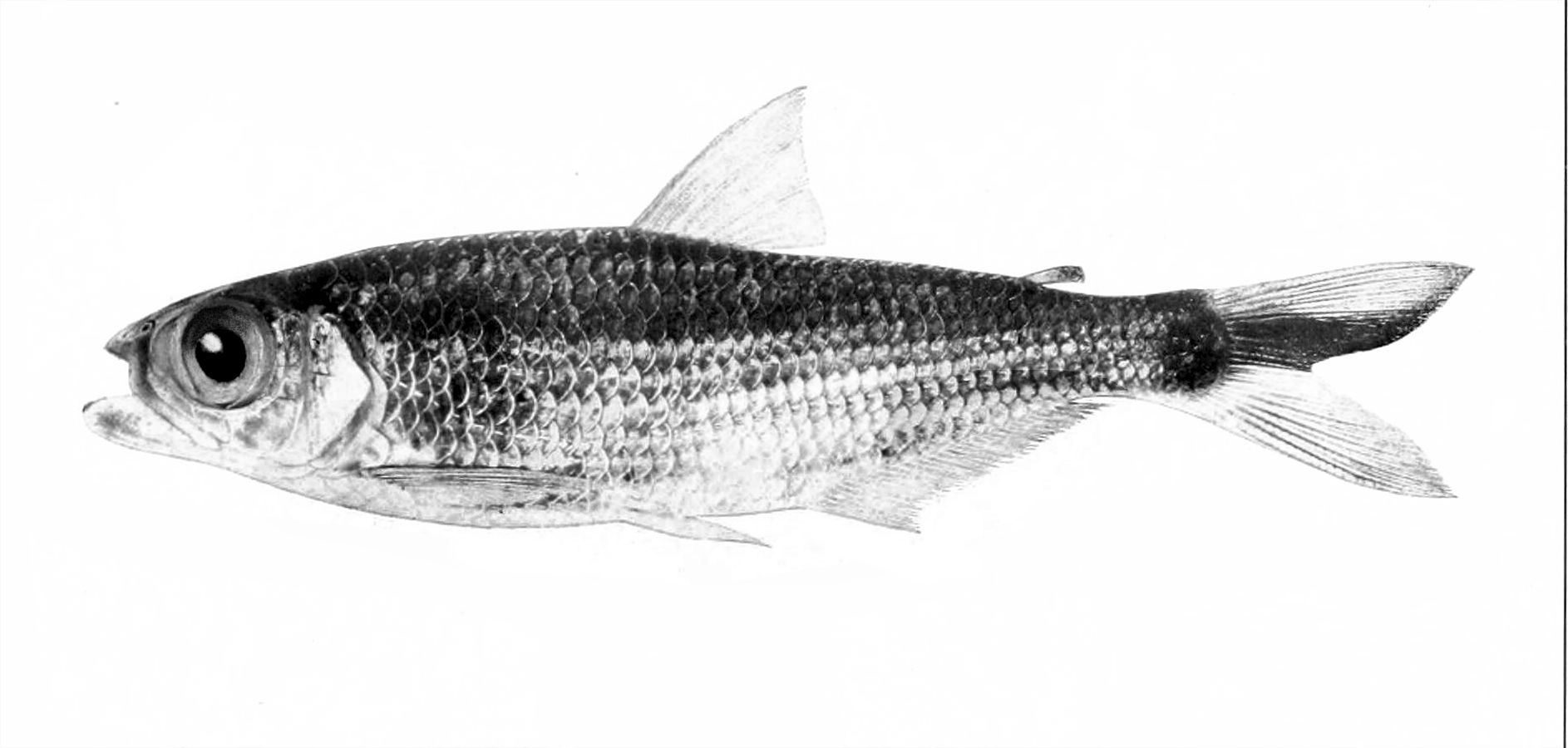
- 1912 illustration

Conservation status
- Least Concern (IUCN 3.1)

Scientific classification
- Kingdom: Animalia
- Phylum: Chordata
- Class: Actinopterygii
- Order: Characiformes
- Family: Iguanodectidae
- Genus: Bryconops
- Species: B. melanurus

Binomial name
- Bryconops melanurus (Bloch, 1794)

Synonyms
- Salmo melanurus Bloch, 1794

= Bryconops melanurus =

Species of fish

Bryconops melanurus, sometimes called the tail-light tetra, is a species of freshwater ray-finned fish belonging to the family Iguanodectidae. This species is found in South America. It lives in small schools and is an active swimmer, which means that it requires open space in its habitat, primarily preying on insects. Nonetheless, it does not demonstrate a strong preference for any one biotope within its native range.

== Description ==
Bryconops melanurus reaches a maximum total length of about 13.2 cm (5.2 in), which puts it on the larger side of the genus Bryconops. The head is slender, with a pointed snout, and B. melanurus lacks a humeral spot of the kind frequently seen in congeners (such as B. humeralis and B. inpai). B. melanurus shares aspects of its jaw structure, which is rather lengthened, with B. inpai, B. affinis, and B. giacopinii. (This was used to place giacopinii in the genus Bryconops instead of its originally described Autanichthys.)

Bryconops melanurus is a silvery, slender fish with a darker back. The caudal fin has distinctive markings, but lacks a well-formed ocellus (eyespot). There is a dark stripe about the width of the pupil that veers from the center of this fin up towards the dorsal lobe, and the caudal-fin margins are dusky. The rest of the fin is either light in pigment (usually yellowish) or entirely clear.

Bryconops melanurus has noted morphological similarities with congeners B. transitoria and B. gracilis, but can be differentiated based on morphometric specifics and differences in fin structure; for instance, B. transitoria has 23-27 anal-fin rays, whereas B. melanurus has 28–29. B. melanurus is also known to be similar to B. cytogaster, but cyrtogaster has a deeper body and a greater number of anal-fin rays (30-31).

While it lacks a common name accepted by the wider scientific community, hobbyists know it as the tail-light tetra. It should not be confused with the head-and-tail light tetra, Hemigrammus ocellifer, which is a different fish in the same order, Characiformes.

== Taxonomy ==
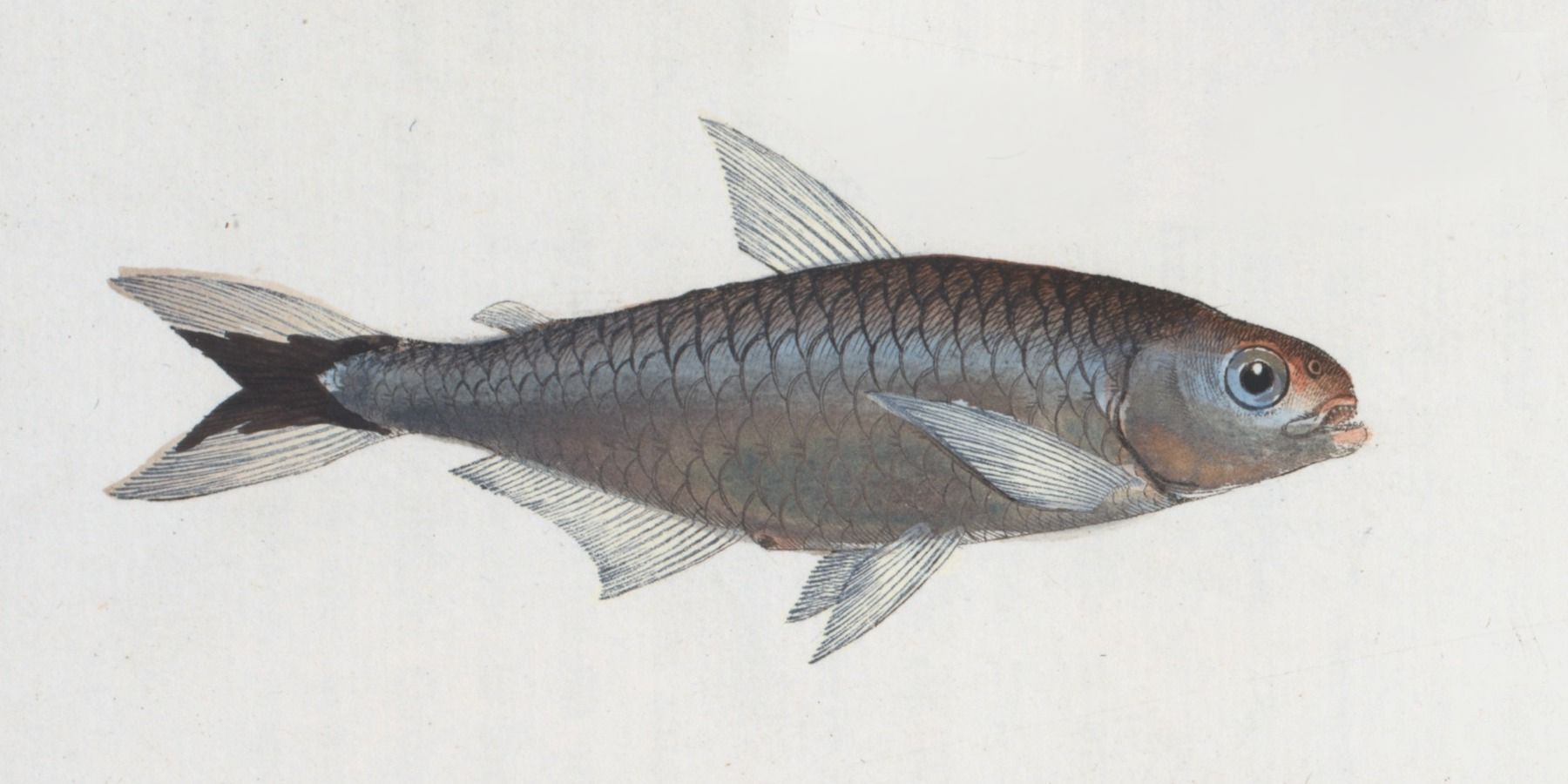
1797 illustration, labeled Salmo melanurus

Bryconops melanurus, when originally described by German naturalist Marcus Elieser Bloch in 1794, was named Salmo melanurus, and was listed as a salmon native to Suriname. (In modern taxonomy, the name Salmo applies to a genus in the family Salmonidae that encompasses trout and salmon from Europe. B. melanurus is not native to Europe, nor is it a salmon.)

By 1926, it had been moved to the genus Creatochanes, which is reflected in a paper by English ichthyologist John Roxborough Norman. Creatochanes is no longer considered a standalone genus, and is instead a subgenus of Bryconops to which B. melanurus belongs. (This makes its full name Bryconops (Creatochanes) melanurus.)

DNA barcoding has revealed that B. melanurus is most closely related to B. transitoria and, slightly more distantly, B. caudoma\culatus.

== Habitat and ecology ==
The type locality of B. melanurus is Suriname, but no specific river was given in the original description. Specimens have been cited from the Caraipé, Curuá, Madeira, and Moju rivers in modern accounts, as well as the Tapajós. Within this range, it seems to demonstrate no preference for any one biotope in particular, but does prefer living in groups.

=== Diet ===
Bryconops melanurus feeds primarily on insects. This is in line with the rest of the genus, members of which are largely invertivores, with a few noted herbivores on the list. Specific dietary habits are unclear, but may be similar to habits of congeners B. inpai and B. magoi, which feed on terrestrial insects that are either washed into the river or that fall from trees hanging above.

== Conservation status ==
Bryconops melanurus has not been evaluated by the IUCN. While it is known to be exported from Peru for use in the aquatics industry, and it has a presence in hobbyist communities, it is not thought to be endangered. Aquarists know it not to fare particularly well in tank settings, partially because it is an active swimmer that needs plenty of space.
