= Bryconops hexalepis =

Scientific classification
- Kingdom: Animalia
- Phylum: Chordata
- Class: Actinopterygii
- Order: Characiformes
- Family: Iguanodectidae
- Genus: Bryconops
- Species: B. hexalepis

Binomial name
- Bryconops hexalepis Guedes, E. F. de Oliveira & Lucinda, 2019

Species of fish

Bryconops hexalepis is a species of freshwater ray-finned fish belonging to the family Iguanodectidae. This species is found in the rivers of Brazil. It is solely found in the drainage of the Rio Tocantins. Rather elongate and quite slender, it is considered one of the smaller species of its genus, with tall scales and large eyes.

The specific name "hexalepis" means "six scales". This is in reference to the number of scales above its lateral line, which is indeed six. In contrast, other members of the genus all have 7-10 scales therein, which offers a good baseline defining trait for identification.

== Description ==
Most members of the genus Bryconops are between 6 and 8 cm SL (standard length). B. hexalepis is on the small end of average, with the largest of its original specimens measuring 6.67 cm SL. Later specimens measured 7.15-7.67 cm SL. It has a generally elongated body shape, with a spine 40 to 41 vertebrae long, and is rather slender, with the deepest point of its body located at the origin of its dorsal fin. The head is large, but the maxillary itself is somewhat short in comparison to structures seen in other Bryconops.

The scales themselves are cycloid, and taller than they are wide. B. hexalepis possesses a dark lateral stripe, and the body color is a dark silvery in life, turning dark-yellow to slightly brown upon preservation in alcohol. The fins are largely hyaline (clear), with the exception of a dusky caudal-fin margin.

=== Sexual dimorphism ===
In many members of Bryconops, there are few to no morphometric or coloration differences between male and female specimens. B. hexalepis presents an exception to this; the pelvic fin is shorter in females, not reaching the anal-fin origin, but the pelvic fin reaches or passes this point in males. Like many Bryconops, mature males of B. hexalepis also sport bony hooks on some of the anal- and pelvic-fin rays.

== Taxonomy ==
Bryconops hexalepis was officially described in 2019, making it one of the most recent additions to the genus, and has no known scientific synonyms. There are two subgenera in Bryconops, Bryconops and Creatochanes; B. hexalepis belongs to the former. This is because its gill rakers are poorly denticulated (vs. well denticulated in Creatochanes) and because it lacks teeth on the maxillae (vs. 1-3 multicuspid teeth on either side of the maxillae).

Prior to 2011, all members of Bryconops were considered members of the family Characidae. However, closer examination of phylogeny prompted the move of Bryconops to a new family, Iguanodectidae, alongside the genera Piabucus and Iguanodectes. (Bryconops, however, is a monophyletic clade, whereas Iguanodectes and Piabucus make up the subfamily Iguanodectinae.)

The scientific name is from Greek, and means "six scales" in reference to the six scales above the lateral line in B. hexalepis. Other members of the genus all have 7 to 10 scales in the same place, making B. hexalepis unique in this aspect.

== Distribution and ecology ==
Bryconops hexalepis occupies many rivers in the upper and middle Rio Tocantins drainage. Its range includes the Brazilian states of Tocantins and Goiás. Other members of Bryconops native to the Tocantins drainage include B. affinis (the orangefin tetra) and B. tocantinensis; the latter of these gets its specific epithet from the region.

Dietary specifics are unknown for B. hexalepis. Based on behaviors in the rest of the genus, it is most likely to be an insectivore or omnivore.

=== Conservation status ===
Though B. hexalepis has not been formally evaluated, its habitat is under constant anthropogenic pressures, as with many others in the genus Bryconops. Threats in the Tocantins region include hydroelectric dams, which are already present in great numbers, with more planned for construction. Deforestation for infrastructure purposes and logging for timber collection are among other threats, both of which have a significant negative impact on the riparian zone.
