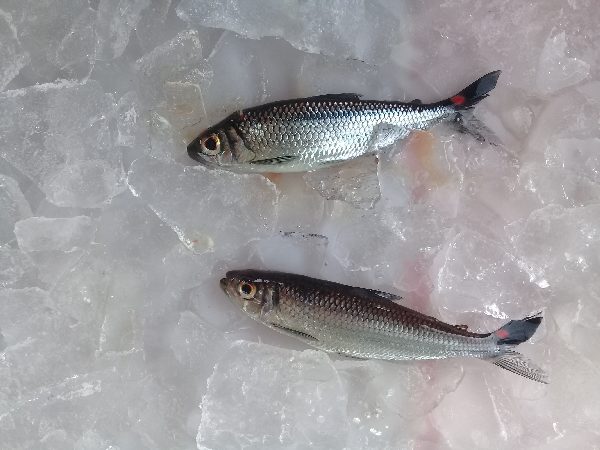

Conservation status
- Least Concern (IUCN 3.1)

Scientific classification
- Kingdom: Animalia
- Phylum: Chordata
- Class: Actinopterygii
- Order: Characiformes
- Family: Iguanodectidae
- Genus: Bryconops
- Species: B. giacopinii

Binomial name
- Bryconops giacopinii (Fernández-Yépez, 1950)

Synonyms
- Autanichthys giacopinii Fernández-Yépez, 1950

= Bryconops giacopinii =

Species of fish

Bryconops giacopinii is a mid-sized species of freshwater fish in the family Iguanodectidae. It is the largest member of the genus Bryconops, and is therefore difficult to confuse with any of its congeners. With a diet that consists largely of land-dwelling insects, it serves as an important link between the terrestrial and aquatic aspects of its native range.

== Description ==
Bryconops giacopinii reaches 18 cm (7 in) long in total length (with the tail fin included), which makes it the longest member of its genus. A close contender is the type species of Bryconops, B. alburnoides, which reaches 15 cm (6 in) in standard length (tail fin left out). B. giacopinii is a deep-bodied and robust fish, with silvery scales and a well-defined caudal ocellus (eyespot on the tail) in yellow or orange.

Bryconops giacopinii bears a notable resemblance to Bryconops caudomaculatus, which was remarked upon in its original description. The original also notes that B. giacopinii, under its basionym Autanichthys giacopinni, may have had some alliance with the fish genus Deuterodon, based on morphological properties.

Bryconops giacopinii has 43 to 46 pored lateral line scales. The lateral line itself is rather obscure, which is a feature that can be used to differentiate it from other species of Bryconops. It can also be told apart from several of its congeners by the fact that it lacks a humeral spot, which is a distinct mark that occurs above or near the pectoral fin in many fish species, including more than one species of Bryconops.

The head makes up about a quarter of the total length, with the eye taking up a little less than half the length of the head. The maxillary teeth are in a set of five, all multicuspid, and the premaxillary teeth are in a set of four, all tricuspid. The original description notes that the posterior portion of the dentary (the lower jaw bone that bears dentition) lacks a set of minute, conical teeth seen in related genera, but modern reexamination counters this with the confirmed presence of teeth; the inside of the mouth is simply very fleshy, and the minute teeth often need to be manually exposed.

== Taxonomy ==
When first described by Venezuelan ichthyologist Agustín Fernández-Yépez in 1950, Bryconops giacopinii was named Autanichthys giacopinni. The specific epithet, giacopinii, honors Fernández-Yépez's friend Jose A. Giacopini. In 1994, Chernoff et al. determined by way of morphology that A. giacopinni's true position was in the genus Bryconops, redesignating it as Bryconops giacopinii. Autanichthys, with no other members, was thus synonymized with Bryconops. (Several of Fernández-Yépez's discoveries have since received the same treatment, with others under review.)

When Fernández-Yépez's initial description was reviewed and the type specimens were sought out, it was determined that they had apparently been lost. Originally part of Fernández-Yépez's private ichthyological collection, Fernández-Yépez himself wrote that he intended to send several specimens to various museums, but consulting said museums yielded no results. Therefore, a neotype was designated upon redescription in 1994.

There are two subgenera in the genus Bryconops: Bryconops and Creatochanes. Bryconops giacopinii belongs to the subgenus Creatochanes along with ten others, making its full scientific name Bryconops (Creatochanes) giacopinii. Others in Creatochanes include B. colanegra, B. colaroja, B. affinis, and B. melanurus. Members of the subgenus Bryconops include B. collettei, B. durbinae, B. caudomaculatus, and B. disruptus.

Upon its original description and for some time after, Bryconops giacopinii was considered a member of the family Tetragonopteridae (which has since been synonymized with the subfamily Tetragonopterinae). However, research in 2011 by Oliveira et al. determined that the genus Bryconops, alongside the genera Iguanodectes and Piabucus, should all be moved to the family Iguanodectidae, revived from the earlier work of German-American ichthyologist Carl H. Eigenmann. Thus, B. giacopinii is currently considered an iguanodectid.

== Distribution and habitat ==
Bryconops giacopinii is known largely from the Autana River, in the upper drainage of the Orinoco river. The genus given in its baisonym, Autanichthys, is in reference to this, as it is where the holotype was collected. Its larger range is the Autana-Sipapo river system as a whole, to which it is mostly restricted. However, it has also been collected from the Kakada river, a tributary of the Caura river that, in turn, flows into the Orinoco. Another tributary of the Orinoco, the Vichada River, extends B. giacopinii's range into Colombia.

The Autana river itself is considered an acidic blackwater environment. Blackwater environments have their distinctive color due to the decay of organic matter, such as leaf litter, that leaches tannins into the water. The microbes responsible for this decay consume a large amount of the available dissolved oxygen, which means that B. giacopinii is not a fish with high-oxygen needs; elsewise, it would not be suited to a blackwater habitat.

=== Conservation status ===
Though the conservation status of Bryconops giacopinii has not been evaluated by the IUCN, it has been found in the protected Caura National Park, which preserves at least a small portion of its range. However, nearby rivers, such as unprotected segments of the Caura, have been subject to a rise in illegal mining activity in recent years, which threatens to disrupt the environment.

== Diet and ecology ==
Terrestrial insects usually make up a large portion of B. giacopinii's diet, but its eating habits are still considered rather generalist. This flexibility is advantageous, as it occasionally needs to change its food sources if living in the same area as another species with similar prey demands. Nonetheless, its reliance on the forest rather than its aquatic habitat reinforces the link between the two different environments, and the importance of maintaining one to sustain the other. B. giacopinii shares its fondness for terrestrial insects with congener Bryconops alburnoides.

In turn, B. giacopinii is not only preyed upon by larger fishes, but is also subject to parasitic infestations. One such parasite is Ergasilus curticrus, a species of copepod described in 2015 after being found in the gills of B. giacopinii. E. curticrus is currently only known to be hosted by B. giacopinii.
