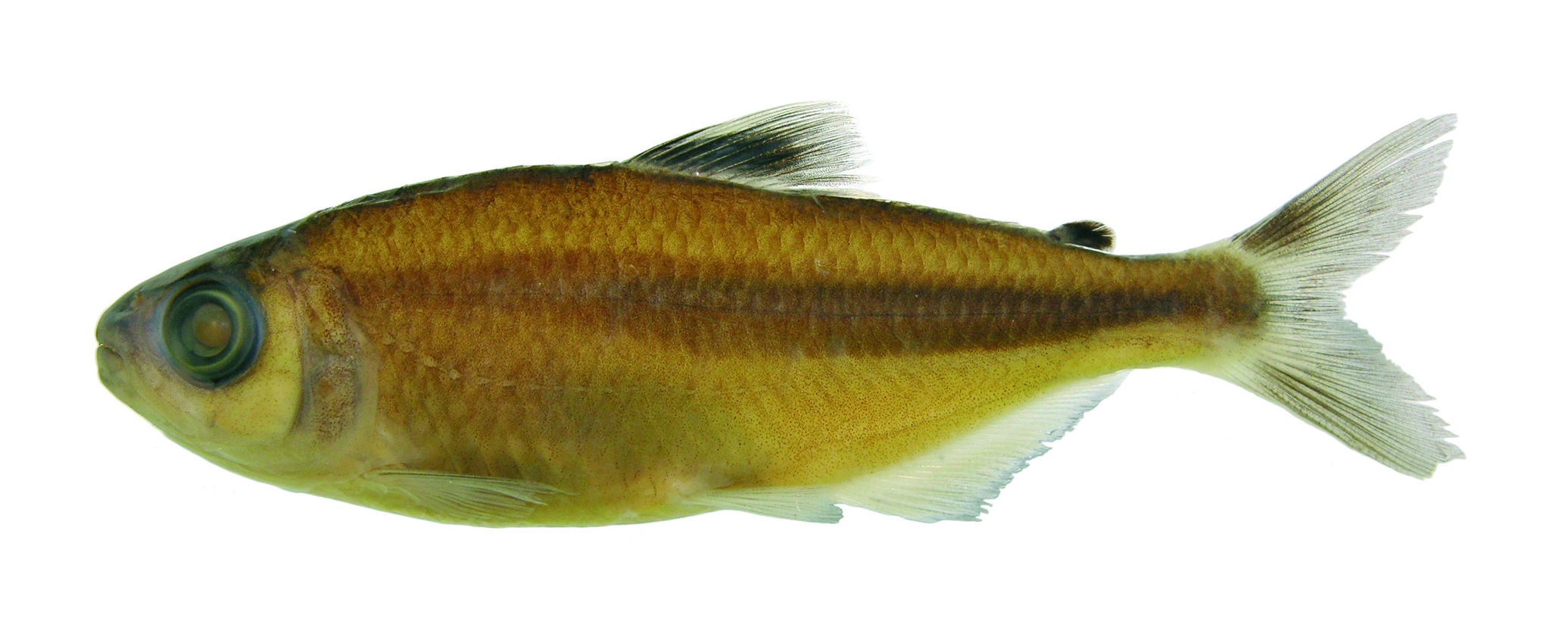

Conservation status
- Least Concern (IUCN 3.1)

Scientific classification
- Kingdom: Animalia
- Phylum: Chordata
- Class: Actinopterygii
- Order: Characiformes
- Family: Iguanodectidae
- Genus: Bryconops
- Species: B. piracolina

Binomial name
- Bryconops piracolina Wingert & L. R. Malabarba, 2011

= Bryconops piracolina =

Species of fish

Bryconops piracolina is a species of freshwater ray-finned fish belonging to the family Iguanodectidae. This species is found in Brazil. It is slender and silvery in color, like many fish in Bryconops, but can be distinguished from other members by way of its dorsal fin, which has a black patch of color extending up from the fin-base; congeners usually have light pigment in the dorsal fin, or a brighter color (as in the orangefin tetra, B. affinis).

Its specific epithet, piracolina, is in reference to the stream where it was found, the Igarapé Piracolina (which is located in the Río Madeira basin).

== Description ==
Bryconops piracolina reaches a maximum of roughly 7.1cm (2.8 in) in standard length (excluding the tail fin). This places it slightly to the smaller side of the genus Bryconops as a whole. Its dorsal fin sports pigmentation along the base that streaks away from the body, which is a unique feature that can be used to distinguish it from its congeners. It lacks humeral spots, which is another distinguishing feature, and its adipose fin is entirely black. The lattermost aspect is shared with Bryconops inpai and Bryconops munduruku, but these two are dissimilar to B. piracolina in many ways. Its slender body shape and general silver coloration are otherwise common aspects.

When a specimen is preserved in alcohol, the scattered black chromatophores (pigment cells) on its face, head, and upper jaw become more evident, though they have little impact on overall coloration. Its lateral line also becomes much clearer, manifesting as a bold, dark stripe against scales that turn a yellowish-brown. The lateral line scales themselves are pored only to the end of the hypural plate, the plate that joins the fish's tail to its body.

== Taxonomy ==
Bryconops piracolina, upon being named in 2011, was assigned to the subgenus Bryconops. It has fewer teeth than is necessary on the maxilla (one to three teeth on both sides) for assignment to the other subgenus, Creatochanes. As with the rest of Bryconops, it was once considered a member of the family Characidae, but research in 2011 moved Bryconops to the family Iguanodectidae, alongside the genera Iguanodectes and Piabucus.

Bryconops piracolina has no known scientific synonyms, having retained its original name. It also has no widely accepted common names, though "Piracolina tetra" has been suggested as a result of its type locality. (The specific epithet "piracolina" originates from the Igarapé Piracolina, where B. piracolina was first described.) Members of Bryconops are but a handful of fish often referred to as "tetras"; examples include B. affinis (the orangefin tetra), B. caudomaculatus (the tailspot tetra), and B. melanurus (the tail-light tetra).

== Distribution and ecology ==
As is reflected in the specific epithet, B. piracolina was first cited from the Igarapé Piracolina (or Piracolina Creek in English), a small stream that flows into the Rio Machado located in Vilhena, Rondônia, Brazil. In turn, the Río Machado is a tributary of the Río Madeira. There is evidence to suggest that B. piracolina is endemic to the area, along with several other species therein. Endemism is a trait known from tributaries of the Río Machado, though in a somewhat limited capacity.

The Igarapé Piracolina itself is a clear-water creek with a fast current and sandy substrate. Its width ranges from 1-3 m (about 3-10 ft), and depth from 0.3-1.5 m (1-5 ft). The Piracolina and its tributaries are surrounded by cultivated farmland, largely soy and corn, with very little riparian vegetation.

=== Conservation status ===
Though little is known of population trends and environmental threats, B. piracolina is considered a species of least concern by the IUCN.
