= Bryconops sapezal =

Scientific classification
- Kingdom: Animalia
- Phylum: Chordata
- Class: Actinopterygii
- Order: Characiformes
- Family: Iguanodectidae
- Genus: Bryconops
- Species: B. sapezal

Binomial name
- Bryconops sapezal Wingert, Chuctaya, & L. R. Malabarba, 2018

Species of fish

Bryconops sapezal is a species of freshwater ray-finned fish belonging to the family Iguanodectidae. This species is found in the Rio Tapajós basin of Brazil. It is one of the more recent additions to its genus, described in 2018, and has a name that means "covered in sapê", or thatching. This originates from the Sapezal municipality of Mato Grosso, Brazil, which is type locality of B. sapezal.

== Description ==
Bryconops sapezal ranges from 3.03 to 6.99 cm SL (standard length), with the largest specimen at 9.12 cm SL. Most species of Bryconops are within the 6 to 8 cm SL range. It is a rather slender and elongate species, with a relatively small head and a body that tapers away from the origin of the dorsal fin. The scales are dark-gray on the back, silver with a bluish tint on the sides, and pale on the belly. A blue tint is rare in Bryconops (only otherwise seen in B. inpai and B. marabaixo); most species are plain silvery or slightly greenish. The lower jaw ranges from dark-yellow to black. The dorsal fin is red, the adipose fin yellow, the pectoral fins translucent, and the base of the anal fin is reddish, the rest also translucent.

One of the most distinctive traits of B. sapezal is the pattern on its caudal fin, which has prominent dark pigmentation in the distal region of the upper lobe and dark-gray pigmentation along the lower margin of the lower lobe. (The base of the fin is red.) It can be told apart from various other species in the genus via other traits as well, such as its lack of a humeral spot and lack of a caudal-fin ocellus (eyespot).

Bryconops sapezal is relatively similar in appearance to congener Bryconops rheoruber. B. rheoruber and B. sapezal both have 8–9 predorsal scales, but B. rheoruber has more scales around the circumference of its caudal peduncle (14–16 vs. 10–13 in B. sapezal).

=== Sexual dimorphism ===
A feature seen in most members of Bryconops is the presence of hooks or spines on select pelvic- and anal-fin rays of mature males. B. sapezal is no exception to this, bearing larger hooks on the pelvic fin than on the anal fin. There is also a slight difference in fin shape, with females bearing a more falcate (hooked) anal fin and males with a more rounded one.

== Taxonomy ==
Bryconops sapezal has retained its original name since its description in 2018. There are two subgenera in Bryconops, Bryconops and Creatochanes, and B. sapezal is considered a part of the latter. Members of Creatochanes are characterized by having 1–3 teeth on either side of the maxillary, having ossified and well-denticulated gill rakers, and having a relatively long maxilla.

=== Etymology ===
The specific name "sapezal" comes from the Sapezal municipality of Mato Grosso, Brazil, which is the type locality of B. sapezal, this name means "cover in sapé, a species of grass, Imperata brasiliensis, in the family Poaceae.

== Distribution and ecology ==
Bryconops sapezal is known only from various locations in the Rio Tapajos basin, including the Rio Tapajos main, Rio Juruena drainage, and Rio Papagaio. Tributaries of the Rio Juruena are generally straight, with turbulent waters and frequent interruption by waterfalls. The Rio Papagaio also has strong currents, and is usually substrated with rock.

=== Conservation status ===
Bryconops sapezal has not been evaluated by the IUCN, but is facing excess survival pressures concerning its habitat. The natural range of B. sapezal extends near several dams, including one from which the holotype (original specimen) was collected. (Which dam in particular was not specified in the original report.) The Tapajos is frequent collateral damage in various projects both legal and illegal, including infrastructure development and illegal gold mining; these factors place species like B. sapezal at risk. Anthropogenic hazards are a frequent source of concern for members of Bryconops as a genus.

On the other hand, B. sapezal has a good deal of native habitat contained within ecological reserves, like the Jaú National Park; It is the largest Amazon rainforest reserve, and surrounds part of the Rio Papagaio.
