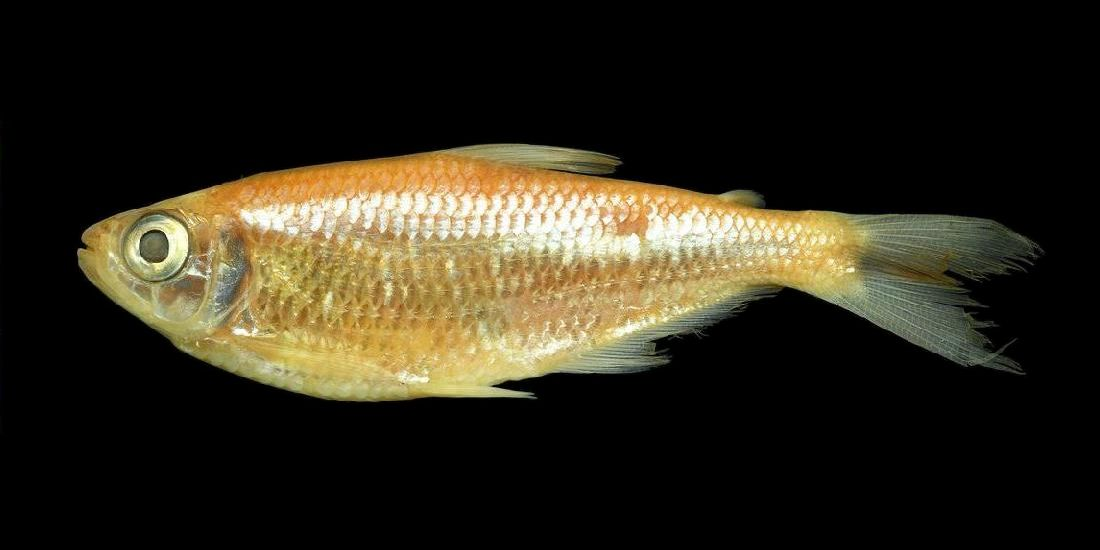
- Preserved specimen

Scientific classification
- Kingdom: Animalia
- Phylum: Chordata
- Class: Actinopterygii
- Order: Characiformes
- Family: Iguanodectidae
- Genus: Bryconops
- Species: B. cyrtogaster

Binomial name
- Bryconops cyrtogaster (Norman, 1926)

Synonyms
- Creatochanes cyrtogaster Norman, 1926

= Bryconops cyrtogaster =

Species of fish

Bryconops cyrtogaster is a midsize species of freshwater ray-finned fish belonging to the family Iguanodectidae.This species is found in the Oyapock river in French Guiana and Brazil. It is overall silver, with an indistinct dark patch at the base of the tail fin that spreads onto the fin rays slightly. Originally described in 1926 under a different baisonym, it was the subject of a redescription in June 2020.

== Description ==
Bryconops cyrtogaster is about 12 cm (4.7 in) in total length, which makes it slightly longer than the average member of its genus. Its scales are generally silver, with a faint lateral line towards its back half. One of its identifying features is a diffuse dark patch on the caudal peduncle that bleeds into the upper lobe of the caudal fin. It also has a single humeral spot above each pectoral fin.

The snout is short and the eye wide in comparison, the latter larger than the former. The mouth itself is terminal, equipped with multicuspid teeth (a feature seen in all members of Bryconops, as well as sister clade Iguanodectinae). The origin of the dorsal fin is slightly closer to the caudal fin than to the tip of the snout.

Bryconops cyrtogaster bears several morphological similarities to other members of the genus. It shares the presence of a single humeral patch with congeners Bryconops humeralis, Bryconops vibex, and Bryconops marabaixo, but can be differentiated from the former two by a deeper body and a humeral spot located slightly farther back on the body. B. marabaixo has fewer predorsal scales and a shorter maxillary than B. cyrtogaster. Overall, B. cyrtogaster bears the greatest similarity to B. marabaixo, Bryconops inpai, and Bryconops munduruku.

Until 2020, Bryconops cyrtogaster was generally poorly studied, but received a redescription by Silva-Oliveira et al. in June of that year. The same study that cemented its characteristics also named similar congener B. marabaixo.

== Taxonomy ==
When first described by English ichthyologist John Roxborough Norman in 1926, Bryconops cyrtogaster was listed under the original name Creatochanes cyrtogaster, and has undergone several classification changes since. Knöppel et al. identified Bryconops cyrtogaster as a subspecies of Bryconops melanurus in 1968, dubbing it Bryconops (Creatochanes) melanurus cyrtogaster. Chernoff et al. further simplified this designation, considering B. cyrtogaster a synonym of B. melanurus. Finally, Silva-Oliveira et al. considered Bryconops cyrtogaster an independent species in 2018.

Though its taxonomy has since been studied more closely and subsequently changed, Norman's original placement for Bryconops cyrtogaster retains an element of validity. B. cyrtogaster is considered a part of the subgenus Creatochanes, making its full scientific name Bryconops (Creatochanes) cyrtogaster. The specific epithet ""cyrtogaster" means "curved belly", but B. cyrtogaster lacks an accepted common name.

The genus Bryconops as a whole was once considered a member of the family Characidae, but has since been reclassified as a member of the family Iguanodectidae. Some sources, such as Animal Diversity Web and ITIS, still list it under Characidae, but the current accepted standing of Bryconops cyrtogaster is as an Iguanodectid fish.

== Habitat and ecology ==
Bryconops cyrtogaster is only known from the Oyapock river (between French Guiana and Brazil), and this has been the case ever since its discovery. It demonstrates a preference for rocky or sandy substrate, as well as fast-flowing and well-oxygenated water, such as where waterfalls intersect with the current.

=== Conservation status ===
Bryconops cyrtogaster has not been evaluated by the IUCN. The Oyapock river is not the subject of extensive development, but has a history of gold mining, which raises the amount of pollutants - specifically mercury - in the water. However, regions of a high flow or with a sandy substrate have a lower mercury content, meaning that B. cyrtogaster's preferred environment shields it from potential mercury toxicity. The Oyapock river's spread of 28000 km^{2} offers B. cyrtogaster a relatively wide native range, meaning that it is unlikely to be at risk for extinction.

Bryconops cyrtogaster is likely taken from the wild for use in the aquarium industry, but details are sparse.
