= Bryconops marabaixo =

Scientific classification
- Kingdom: Animalia
- Phylum: Chordata
- Class: Actinopterygii
- Order: Characiformes
- Family: Iguanodectidae
- Genus: Bryconops
- Species: B. marabaixo

Binomial name
- Bryconops marabaixo Silva-Oliveira, Moreira, Lima & Py-Daniel, 2020

Species of fish

Bryconops marabaixo is a species of freshwater ray-finned fish belonging to the family Iguanodectidae. This species is found in the lower Amazon basin, native to the Rio Jari. It is small and silvery, with a dark-gray back, and its fins are mostly clear, though the caudal fin has a dark stripe on the lower margin of the dorsal lobe, and a spot of red pigment just above that. Like many other members of Bryconops, it has a humeral spot, which is a mark near each pectoral fin.

Bryconops marabaixo was officially named in 2020, though it was the secondary focus of the nominal article. The study that described it had the primary purpose of solidifying a proper description for congener Bryconops cyrtogaster, to which it has some superficial resemblance.

== Description ==
Bryconops marabaixo is a relatively small member of its genus. The holotype, or first collected specimen, measured 6.17cm SL (standard length), and further specimens measured 5.04-6.09 cm SL. Most members of Bryconops are between 6 and 8 cm SL. The body, while compressed, is rather convex, especially in comparison to other members of Bryconops.

The scales are generally silver, with a blue-green tint, and they are darker on B. marabaixo's back; this color changes to a yellowish or pale-brown upon preservation of a dead specimen in alcohol. (A silver-to-greenish color is not uncommon in Bryconops. A bluish tint is only otherwise seen in B. inpai and B. sapezal.) In life, the dark coloration from the back extends to the caudal peduncle and somewhat onto the base of the caudal fin. The humeral mark is middlingly conspicuous.

Bryconops marabaixo bears some morphological resemblance to congeners Bryconops chernoffi and Bryconops rheoruber. In all three, there are 8–9 predorsal scales (as opposed to 10–17 in other Bryconops) and a similar position of dorsal-fin origin. In marabaixo and chernoffi, the lateral line reaches the interradial membrane (the fin membrane itself) of the caudal fin, where it does not in any other congeners. Nonetheless, differentiation from B. marabaixo specifically is simple because B. chernoffi and B. rheoruber both lack a humeral spot.

== Taxonomy ==
The genus Bryconops has two subgenera, Bryconops and Creatochanes. B. marabaixo is characterized as belonging to Creatochanes by way of its teeth and gill rakers; members of Creatochanes have 1–3 teeth in either side of the maxillae, and the gill rakers are ossified (bony) and well-denticulated. Both traits are seen in B. marabaixo, though it has a jaw structure more reminiscent of subgenus Bryconops.

B. marabaixo has no known synonyms, and has retained its original name since discovery.

=== Etymology ===
The specific epithet "marabaixo" originates from a collection of religious and festive practices, Marabaixo, that originated in Amapá, Brazil, the type locality of B. marabaixo. It is strongly associated with the resistance and cultural strength of black Brazilians, who were originally settled in the region as slaves. The religious aspect is tied with the saints of the Catholic church.

== Distribution and ecology ==
Bryconops marabaixo is only present in the Rio Jari and the Rio Iratapuru. The latter is a tributary of the former. It is the only species of Bryconops to be found in the rio Jari, though most species of Bryconops are from other regions of the Amazon. The range of B. marabaixo seems to be limited by the Cachoeira de Santo Antônio, a major waterfall in a downstream portion of the Jari.

=== Conservation status ===
Though B. marabaixo has not been officially evaluated, a large portion of its native range, the Rio Jari, is within the Nascentes do Lago Jari National Park. This park is one of few left in the region that prioritizes biological diversity and preservation, as opposed to sustainable use of natural resources. Nonetheless, it is under threat of illegal activities that include an unlawful access road that cuts through various protected areas. While this is not an immediate threat to the aquatic environment of the region, it sets a precedent of deliberate anthropogenic hazard that may eventually extend into B. marabaixo's habitat.
