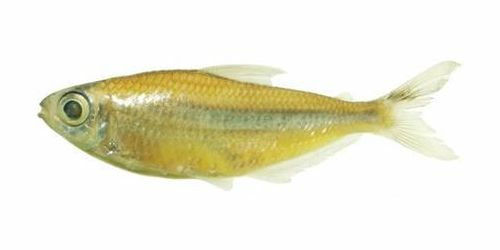
- Preserved holotype

Scientific classification
- Kingdom: Animalia
- Phylum: Chordata
- Class: Actinopterygii
- Division: Teleostei
- Order: Characiformes
- Family: Iguanodectidae
- Genus: Bryconops
- Species: B. florenceae

Binomial name
- Bryconops florenceae Silva-Oliveira, Ota, Sabaj & Py-Daniel, 2021

= Bryconops florenceae =

Species of fish

Bryconops florenceae is a small freshwater fish that inhabits the rivers of South America. Comprehensive research is lacking due to B. florenceae being the most recently described of the genus, but researchers believe it to be a relatively widespread species. It is found throughout the Maroni, Mana, and Sinnamary river basins, which defines its range within Suriname and French Guiana.

Originally documented in a guide to the freshwater fishes of French Guiana published in 1996, B. florenceae was not officially named until 2021. Even in 1996, there was suspicion that it was yet unknown to science, despite resembling many of the native fish already identified.

== Description ==
Bryconops florenceae measures from 7.55 to 9.45 cm in standard length when fully grown. This places it slightly to the larger side of the genus Bryconops, though all members are of a similar size (within a roughly 3cm range). Its scales are generally silvery with a touch of tan towards the dorsal region. Silver coloration is not uncommon within Bryconops.

One of the features that characterizes B. florenceae is a unique caudal-fin pattern. There is an isolated blotch of dark pigment near the base of the upper lobe, and the distal regions of the fin are left pale. This blotch of coloration is also seen in B. rheoruber, though there are other differences between the two; for instance, the distal regions of B. rheoruber's caudal fin are dusky, as are areas of its snout and jaw.

=== Sexual dimorphism ===
Male specimens of B. florenceae are equipped with bony hooks on the rays of the anal and pelvic fins. It is unknown if these hooks are permanent, or are a feature solely seen within mating season. Other members of Bryconops also display this feature.

== Taxonomy ==
There are two subgenera in the genus Bryconops: Bryconops and Creatochanes. B. florenceae belongs to the former, based upon the fact that its maxillary bones lack teeth. (Members of Creatochanes are characterized partially by having 1-3 teeth on either side of the maxilla.) B. rheoruber, a congener of remarkable similarity, also belongs to Bryconops.

Based upon significant morphological similarity and a history of synonymy, Bryconops florenceae is a candidate for the Bryconops caudomaculatus species complex, though this has not been officially recognized. Other members of this species complex (along with B. caudomaculatus) include B. disruptus, B. durbini, B. collettei, and B. magoi. B. rheoruber is also in consideration due to its own visual overlap with B. caudomaculatus.

Prior to 2011, members of Bryconops were considered members of the family Characidae, which is of remarkable variation and has many genera incertae sedis. However, research by Oliveira et al. regarding the phylogeny of various characin species prompted that Bryconops be moved to the family Iguanodectidae; it was placed there alongside the genera Iguanodectes and Piabucus.

=== Etymology ===
The specific epithet "florenceae" honors Florence de Rapleye Foerderer, a woman whose will left $7 million each to the Academy of Natural Sciences of Philadelphia, the Philadelphia Zoo, and Gallaudet University (a school for deaf and hard-of-hearing students) after she died in 1999. There was a suggestion to name B. florenceae Bryconops foerdererae, also to honor Foerderer, but speakers of Brazilian Portuguese would have had remarkable difficulty pronouncing "foerdererae". Thus, "florenceae" was chosen instead.

== Distribution and ecology ==
Bryconops florenceae was originally documented from the waters of French Guiana in 1996. Its first appearance was in the book "Atlas des Poissons d'eau douce de Guyane (tome 1)", by Paul Planquette et al., though it was not formally named at the time. Therein, B. florenceae was described as a "western form" of Bryconops caudomaculatus, which is found in the Approuague and Oyapock rivers. Its current range is known to extend into Suriname, including the Sinnamary, Maroni, and Mana rivers; it demonstrates a preference for areas of strong current with rocky substrate.

Though B. florenceae has not been the subject of specific dietary study, it is most likely to be an insectivore or omnivore, as is the pattern throughout its genus.

=== Conservation status ===
Though not formally evaluated by the IUCN, the original description for B. florenceae from researchers suggests an assessment of least concern. This is based upon a large native range and a lack of severe active threats to cut off any part of said range. Nonetheless, it may be the case that B. florenceae ends up as one of several Bryconops species threatened by human activity, such as illegal mining or farmland settlement.
