= Bryconops munduruku =

Scientific classification
- Kingdom: Animalia
- Phylum: Chordata
- Class: Actinopterygii
- Division: Teleostei
- Order: Characiformes
- Family: Iguanodectidae
- Genus: Bryconops
- Species: B. munduruku

Binomial name
- Bryconops munduruku Silva-Oliveira, Canto & F. R. V. Ribeiro, 2015

Species of fish

Bryconops munduruku is a small freshwater fish of the family Iguanodectidae that lives in the rivers of South America. Its adipose fin is black, with a clear base, and it has two humeral spots, which is a feature it shares with few congeners. Its fins are a variety of yellow, red, black, and translucent tones; notably, mature males develop hooks on specific fin-rays.

Originally cited from the lower Rio Tapajós, B. munduruku's name pays homage to its type locality. Known as the Tapajós-Tapera, a denomination of Munduruku Indians (an indigenous culture of Brazil) formed the settlement that became the municipality from whence B. munduruku was described, Aveiro.

== Taxonomy ==
Bryconops munduruku is considered a member of the subgenus Creatochanes in the genus Bryconops. It has been regarded as such since its description in 2015. It is sometimes listed as a characin, or member of the family Characidae, but a study in 2011 moved the genera Bryconops, Piabucus, and Iguanodectes into a new family, Iguanodectidae.

Bryconops munduruku has retained its original name, and has no known synonyms.

=== Etymology ===
The specific epithet of Bryconops munduruku is in reference to its type locality. A group of Munduruku Indians, the Tapajós-Tapera, settled in the place that would eventually become Aveiro, the municipality where B. mundukuru was discovered. The genus name "Bryconops" means "resembling Brycon" ("ops" means "appearance").

== Description ==
Bryconops munduruku is a reddish color above the lateral line, with a light-gray belly. It reaches a length of about 9.6 cm (3.8) at a maximum. The upper regions of the head, jaw, and face are a dark gray color. The eyes are red at the upper margin, and yellow everywhere else. The dorsal fin has a red base half and a hyaline (clear) outer half, which is a pattern shared by the caudal fin. The pectoral and pelvic fins, as well as the first few rays of the anal fin, are yellow.

It has two humeral spots, which is a similarity it shares with congener B. inpai, but B. inpai has a stripe extending from its anal-fin base to its caudal-fin base whereas B. munduruku has a uniform color pattern therein. The adipose fin is black with a clear base, which differentiates B. munduruku from B. inpai and B. piracolina, both of which have entirely black adipose fins. B. piracolina can also be told from B. munduruku because its dorsal fin sports a large black blotch.

=== Sexual dimorphism ===
Bryconops munduruku demonstrates sexual dimorphism. In mature males, several rays of the anal, pelvic, and dorsal fins bear hooks or spines that are absent in females. The hooks on the anal fin are larger, while the ones on the dorsal and pelvic fins are more akin to spines. This is a feature not uncommon in Bryconops, also demonstrated by congeners like B. florenceae, B. cyrtogaster, and B. gracilis.

== Habitat and ecology ==
Bryconops munduruku was originally described from a small tributary of the Rio Tapajós in Brazil, the igarapé Açu; this is a location about 10 kilometers from Aveiro, in Brazil's Pará State. Congeners that also live in the Rio Tapajós are B. durbinae, B. gracilis, and B. melanurus. There is evidence to suggest that B. munduruku is an endemic species therein.

With a pH that ranges from 4.5 to 7.8, the Tapajós is a rather acidic clearwater river. B. munduruku in particular was collected from fast-moving water over a sandy riverbed, a specific environment it shares with congener B. giacopinii. Part of the igarapé Açu is within the Tapajós National Forest and is therefore bordered by dense vegetation; this may present a source of food for B. munduruku, though specific dietary needs are not known. (Members of Bryconops tend to either be insectivores that take supplemental plant material or sole herbivores.)

Bryconops munduruku can be found in sympatry with B. giacopinii, Hyphessobrycon agulha, Moenkhausia comma, and various species of Hemigrammus.

== Conservation status ==
Bryconops munduruku has not been evaluated by the IUCN. Nonetheless, its native habitat of the Rio Tapajós is under constant anthropogenic threat, especially in the modern era. Usually, the water is clear, but instances of illegal gold mining have kicked up or added so much sediment that portions of the river turn entirely brown. Illegal gold mining is a thriving industry in South America, despite its dangers to both participants and to the environment, and so species like B. munduruku are under greater survival pressure.

The importance of the Rio Tapajós, however, has prompted various plans for infrastructure development and legal mining operations to be reconsidered, which offers B. munduruku a greater chance of survival. This is also positive news for a human population of roughly 1.4 million people.
