= Bryconops chernoffi =

Conservation status
- Data Deficient (IUCN 3.1)

Scientific classification
- Kingdom: Animalia
- Phylum: Chordata
- Class: Actinopterygii
- Order: Characiformes
- Family: Iguanodectidae
- Genus: Bryconops
- Species: B. chernoffi

Binomial name
- Bryconops chernoffi Silva-Oliveira, Lima & Bogotá-Gregory, 2018

Species of ray-finned fish

Bryconops chernoffi s a small species of freshwater ray-finned fish belonging to the family Iguanodectidae. This fish is found in the rivers of Brazil. Specifically, it is found in the Rio Maicuru and Rio Ipixuna; the latter is a tributary of the former, which is a tributary of the Amazon River main. B. chernoffi demonstrates a preference for clear-water streams with sandy and rocky bottoms.

Bryconops chernoffi is one of the more recent contributions to the genus, and is named after Professor Barry Chernoff, an American ichthyologist responsible for many contributions to the knowledge of the genus Bryconops. It is known to peacefully live alongside various other freshwater fish.

== Description ==
Bryconops chernoffi ranges from 3.86 to 7.59 cm SL (standard length), with a holotype of 5.96 cm SL. This places it slightly to the smaller side of average for a member of Bryconops, as fish therein are usually between 6 and 8 inches SL. It has a somewhat convex underside, with the deepest point of its body located just in front of the origin of the dorsal fin.

The body is generally dark-gray, with a silvery belly and silvery region around the eye; the dark-gray portions retain prominence when a specimen is preserved in alcohol. The snout and mouth are a light brown color. There may be some red coloration on the forward portion of the dorsal fin, which is otherwise dark; a dark dorsal fin is only otherwise seen in congener Bryconops piracolina when it comes to features of Bryconops as a genus.

Bryconops chernoffi bears similarities to several congeners, but has some features that can be used to differentiate it. One thing unique to B. chernoffi in the genus Bryconops is a streak of dark pigmentation along the location of the cleithrum (a bone that could be compared to a shoulder blade, found spanning from the pectoral fin to the top of the cranium). Such a marking is rare even amongst Characiformes as a whole. B. chernoffi is similar to B. allisoni, but has fewer predorsal scales (8–9 vs. 10–12, respectively). Congener B. rheoruber has the same number of predorsal scales, but is dissimilar in that it has fewer teeth.

== Taxonomy ==
Named in 2018, B. chernoffi has retained its original designation as a member of Bryconops. It belongs to the subgenus Creatochanes, one of the two subgenera; the other subgenus is the nominal Bryconops. It has a place in Creatochanes due to the bony and well-denticulated gill rakers, plus the presence of 1-3 teeth on either side of the maxillae.

To compare, members of the Bryconops subgenus have no teeth on the maxillae, rarely one, and the gill rakers are poorly-denticulated. This is part of why B. chernoffi and B. rheoruber can be told apart; B. rheoruber is a part of subgenus Bryconops.

=== Etymology ===
The specific name "chernoffi" honors Professor Barry Chernoff, an American ichthyologist with many contributions to the knowledge of Bryconops and to ichthyology as a field. He has described or co-authored original descriptions of various species of Bryconops. Chernoff is aware of his namesake, and learned of it via what he thought was a "junk email" that turned out to be a notification of a new species. He wrote to the authors of the original description to thank them for their homage, saying it is "the honor of a lifetime".

== Distribution and ecology ==
Bryconops chernoffi was originally collected from the Rio Maicuru, a tributary of the Amazon River main. Specifically, it was collected from a small pool in the Rio Ipixuna, which is itself a tributary of the Maicuru. It demonstrates a preference for clear waters over a substrate of sand and/or rocks. Little else is known of its behavior or habits.

=== Conservation status ===
Bryconops chernoffi has not been evaluated by the IUCN. There is protection in place around parts of its natural environment in the form of two ecological and biological reserves that the Maicuru river passes through, the Maicuru and Grão-Pará. These areas were legally codified as recently as 2006, offering B. chernoffi not only environmental protection but precedent for the establishment of further biological reserves that may cover the rest of its territory.
