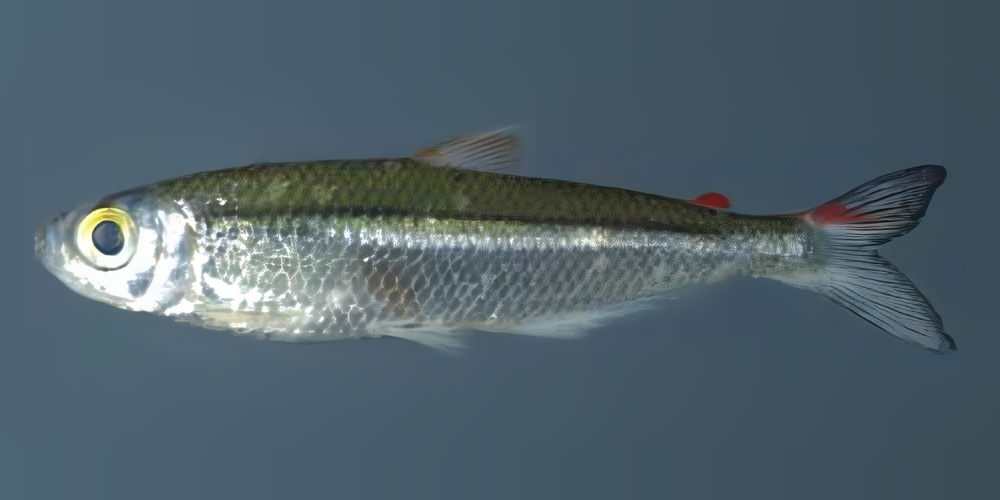

Scientific classification
- Kingdom: Animalia
- Phylum: Chordata
- Class: Actinopterygii
- Order: Characiformes
- Family: Iguanodectidae
- Genus: Bryconops
- Species: B. collettei

Binomial name
- Bryconops collettei Chernoff & Machado-Allison, 2005

= Bryconops collettei =

Species of fish

Bryconops collettei is a small species of freshwater ray-finned fish belonging to the family Iguanodectidae. This fish is found the rivers of South America. It is mostly silvery, with notable green iridescence on its sides, and a diffuse ocellus (eyespot) on the upper lobe of the caudal fin. Before its distinction as a separate species, specimens of B. collettei were misidentified as specimens of Bryconops caudomaculatus due to several morphological similarities, including a caudal ocellus and generally similar fin coloration.

Due to a generally peaceful nature, B. collettei forms schools with various species of fish, not just conspecifics. Particular dietary needs are not known, but it is likely to be an insectivore, based on patterns in the rest of the genus. It can usually be found in areas with acidic waters and plentiful riparian vegetation.

== Taxonomy ==
Bryconops collettei was first described in 2005, in a study that also named B. magoi and reestablished the characteristics that identify B. caudomaculatus. It is a member of the subgenus Bryconops (as opposed to the other subgenus in the genus Bryconops, Creatochanes), making its full scientific name Bryconops (Bryconops) collettei. It is considered a part of the Bryconops caudomaculatus species complex due to a history of synonymy with the species, as well as extensive morphological similarities.

Like the rest of the genus Bryconops, B. collettei was once considered a characin, or member of the family Characidae. However, research in 2011 by Oliveira et al. moved the genera Bryconops, Piabucus, and Iguanodectes into the family Iguanodectidae, which is where B. collettei currently stands. Some sources, such as Animal Diversity Web and ITIS, still list the genus Bryconops as a member of Characidae.

=== Etymology ===
The specific epithet "collettei" is in reference to Bruce B. Collette, the senior systematic zoologist at the National Marine Fisheries Service at the time of B. collettei's description. Collette was responsible for significant contributions to systematic ichthyology and to the careers of both authors that named B. collettei. In terms of a common name, B. collettei has none that are widely accepted.

== Description ==
Bryconops collettei is within the range of 7.8 cm (3.1 in) long in standard length, which puts it slightly to the smaller side of the genus Bryconops. Its scales are generally silvery with a touch of iridescent green, and it has a lateral stripe in various colors: black on top, silver in the middle, and emerald-green at the bottom. One of its defining features is an indistinct red spot, or ocellus, on the upper lobe of the tail fin; this spot is rather diffuse, manifesting as a narrow ellipse or a streak rather than a strong and definite patch.

Though Bryconops collettei bears similarities to congeners Bryconops magoi and Bryconops caudomaculatus, it can readily be told apart by several factors. In B. caudomaculatus, the pored lateral line scales stop at the hypural plate and do not extend onto the caudal fin itself, but in B. collettei they extend two to three scales beyond that point. (This is a feature that B. collettei shares with B. magoi.) B. collettei's caudal ocellus is also less distinct than that of B. caudomaculatus. When compared to B. magoi, the general body shape is different in several ways, including B. collettei's shorter snout and longer spine, but the coloration is quite similar.

== Habitat and ecology ==
Bryconops collettei is found only in Venezuela, with a preference for rivers that have a moderate-to-fast flow and rocky or sandy substrate. Its type locality is in the Bolívar state of Venezuela, a site in the Río Nichare (a tributary of the Río Caura) at Wakawajai, a small lagoon therein. It inhabits more acidic environments, both clear and blackwater (more common in blackwater), and can often be found in schools with other species of fish.

Due to its partial habitation of blackwater rivers, it is known that B. collettei does not need well-oxygenated waters to survive. Microbial activity is responsible for blackwater conditions, and therefore the water is low in oxygen, as microbes consume a large percentage of available dissolved oxygen in the process of inducing decay. Thus, fish with high-oxygen needs are not suited to blackwater environments.

=== Diet ===
Cursory study has shown that B. collettei has a taste for terrestrial insects, but there hasn't been a great deal of diet-specific research. This is a similarity it shares with congener B. alburnoides, which also eats terrestrial insects. Other congeners prefer flying insects, such as B. caudomaculatus, which is known to jump out of the water in pursuit of airborne prey.

== Conservation status ==
Bryconops collettei has not been evaluated by the IUCN. Though it is sometimes taken from the wild for the aquarium industry and its trade is not restricted, it is not in wide use, and therefore is not at considerable risk of population depletion. An aspect of conservation to note is that B. collettei lives in the Caura river basin, which is under consistent anthropogenic pressures.
