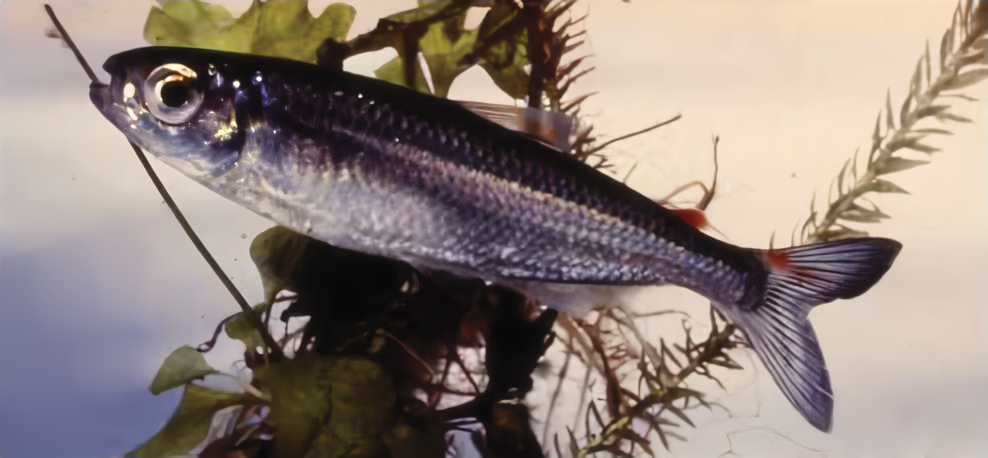

Scientific classification
- Kingdom: Animalia
- Phylum: Chordata
- Class: Actinopterygii
- Order: Characiformes
- Family: Iguanodectidae
- Genus: Bryconops
- Species: B. magoi

Binomial name
- Bryconops magoi Chernoff & Machado-Allison, 2005

= Bryconops magoi =

Species of fish

Bryconops magoi is a species of freshwater ray-finned fish belonging to the family Iguanodectidae. This species is found in South America, where it is only found in Venezuela, along with sister species Bryconops collettei. Its tail-fin markings help to differentiate it from various congeners, as does its fairly restricted range. It is most closely related to B. collettei and Bryconops caudomaculatus, and it was once considered synonymous with the latter; specimens of B. magoi and B. collettei both were routinely misidentified as B. caudomaculatus before being given species distinction.

== Description ==
B. magoi has a maximum size within the range of 7.0 cm (2.8 in), which places it to the smaller side of the genus Bryconops as a whole. Its caudal fin (tail fin) bears a rather diffuse ocellus (eyespot), the upper half of which is colored red; this is a similarity it shares with B. collettei. This eyespot is not well-defined, but is clear against the dark coloration of the caudal fin overall (which is dense in melanophores). Its scales are overall metallic or gray towards the back, becoming more silvery towards the belly, and it has a lateral line stripe in three colors; the base is a black band with a silver stripe beneath, finished with an iridescent-yellow line.

Bryconops caudomaculatus and Bryconops collettei both bear multiple similarities to Bryconops magoi, but there are various ways to tell them apart. One of these is the pored lateral line scales, which stop at the hypural plate and do not extend onto the caudal fin itself in B. caudomaculatus; In B. magoi, they extend two to three scales beyond that point. (This is a diagnostic aspect that B. magoi shares with B. collettei.) B. magoi and B. collettei are similar in many ways as well, such as coloration (though more green in B. collettei), but their varying body shapes make them dissimilar enough to tell apart. Such aspects include a longer snout (a mean of 6.8% of the body length in magoi vs. 4.7% in collettei) and a shorter spine (modally 41-42 vertebrae in magoi vs. 42-43 in collettei).

== Taxonomy ==
Bryconops magoi, along with congener Bryconops collettei, was first described in a study in 2005. Said study also contained a redescription of Bryconops caudomaculatus, due to the species' generally enigmatic nature. Its full scientific name is Bryconops (Bryconops) magoi, as it is a part of the subgenus Bryconops (as opposed to the other subgenus in Bryconops, Creatochanes). It is considered a part of the Bryconops caudomaculatus species complex because of morphological similarities and a history of synonymy therein.

Bryconops magoi, as with the rest of Bryconops, was once considered a characin, or member of the family Characidae. However, research in 2011 by Oliveira et al. moved the genera Bryconops, Piabucus, and Iguanodectes into the family Iguanodectidae, which is where B. magoi currently stands. (Within Iguanodectidae, Bryconops is its own monotypic clade, whereas Piabucus and Iguanodectes make up the subfamily Iguanodectinae). Bryconops is still listed as a member of Characidae by some sources, such as Animal Diversity Web.

The specific epithet "magoi" pays homage to Francisco Mago-Leccia, who is referred to in the nominal study as the “pioneer of modern ichthyological studies in Venezuela”. There are no common names currently accepted for B. magoi, though "Mago's tetra" has been suggested as an extension of the species's namesake.

== Habitat and ecology ==
Bryconops magoi is found only in Venezuela, with a fairly restricted range. All paratypes were collected from the type locality: the Rio Moquete at Paso Bajito, which is located in the Francisco de Miranda Municipality, in the Venezuelan state of Anzoátegui. This is just north of the Orinoco river, the largest river in Venezuela. It demonstrates a preference for fast-moving water over sandy substrate, and is most often found swimming close to the surface, schooling with other species of fish. It is not often taken from the wild for the aquarium trade, and is not considered at risk of population depletion therein. It has not been evaluated by the IUCN.

In demonstrating a preference for a blackwater habitat (many rivers in the Orinoco basin are blackwater), B. magoi also demonstrates that it does not have high-oxygen needs. Microbial activity is responsible for blackwater conditions, and microbes consume a large percentage of available dissolved oxygen in the process of decay (and said decay releases dark-colored tannins into the environment). Thus, fish with high-oxygen needs are not suited to blackwater environments, which are low-oxygen by way of the processes that characterize them.

=== Diet ===
Cursory examination shows that B. magoi feeds at the surface of the water, largely targeting insects that fall in from trees hanging above. This is a similarity it shares with congener B. inpai, which also has a taste for terrestrial insects and other invertebrates that originate outside of the river system. The rest of Bryconops is also largely composed of invertivores, though some are noted herbivores.
