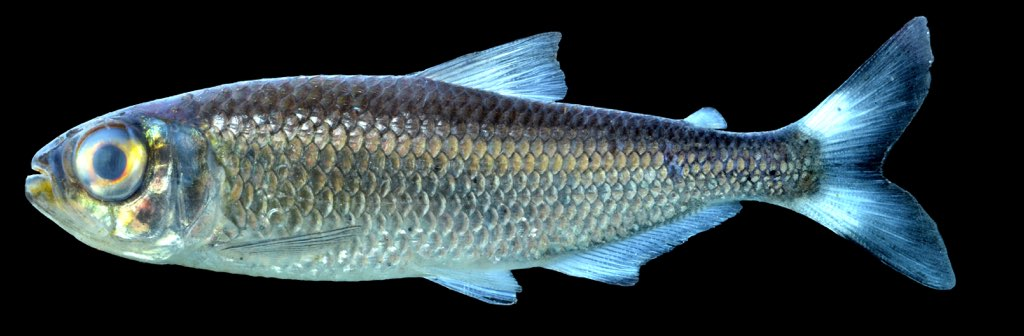

Conservation status
- Least Concern (IUCN 3.1)

Scientific classification
- Kingdom: Animalia
- Phylum: Chordata
- Class: Actinopterygii
- Division: Teleostei
- Order: Characiformes
- Family: Iguanodectidae
- Genus: Bryconops
- Species: B. affinis

Binomial name
- Bryconops affinis Günther, 1864

Synonyms
- Tetragonopterus affinis Günther, 1864

= Orangefin tetra =

Species of fish

The orangefin tetra (Bryconops affinis) is a small species of freshwater fish from South America that belongs to the family Iguanodectidae. Though common in its native range, it seems to prefer fast-flowing and shallow creeks. It is an active swimmer that feeds on plant material and various invertebrates, sometimes jumping out of the water to catch prey above the surface.

It has a peaceful demeanor, living in schools and inhabiting the same areas as various other fish species. When it spawns, it prefers environments with plentiful vegetation. Its eggs are adhesive, and are released in batches instead of all at once.

It looks quite similar to one of its congeners, B. melanurus, hence the specific epithet "affinis" (which means "close to"). Another common name is "orangefin characin", but this is inaccurate; a characin is any fish of the family Characidae, and the orangefin tetra belongs to the family Iguanodectidae. However, it used to be classified as a member of Characidae, so the name is not outright incorrect, just outdated.

== Description ==
The orangefin tetra is relatively small, reaching a maximum of 12.0 cm (4.7 in) in total length; this makes it similar in size to its congeners B. caudomaculatus and B. cyrtogaster. The body shape is generally reminiscent of all Bryconops species, described as "smelt-like", similar to the genus Piabucus. Upon close inspection, the scales of B. affinis display very faint radial lines, where the rest of the genus has stronger scale patterning.

The common name "orangefin tetra" originates from the spots of bright orange on the caudal fin on both the upper and lower lobes. Its dorsal fin is also orange, but this is not as evident upon first glance, and is more pronounced in some specimens than others. The scientific name "affinis" means "close to" in Latin, which is an indicator of similarity to its congener B. melanurus.

== Taxonomy ==
The baisonym of Bryconops affinis is Tetragonopterus affinis, given by Albert Günther in 1864. It has also been referred to as Creatochanes affinis and Roeboides affinis, though the latter of these is now used for a different species altogether. The former name, however, still holds some accuracy; Creatochanes technically stands as a subgenus of Bryconops, to which B. affinis belongs (alongside B. caudomaculatus and B. melanurus).

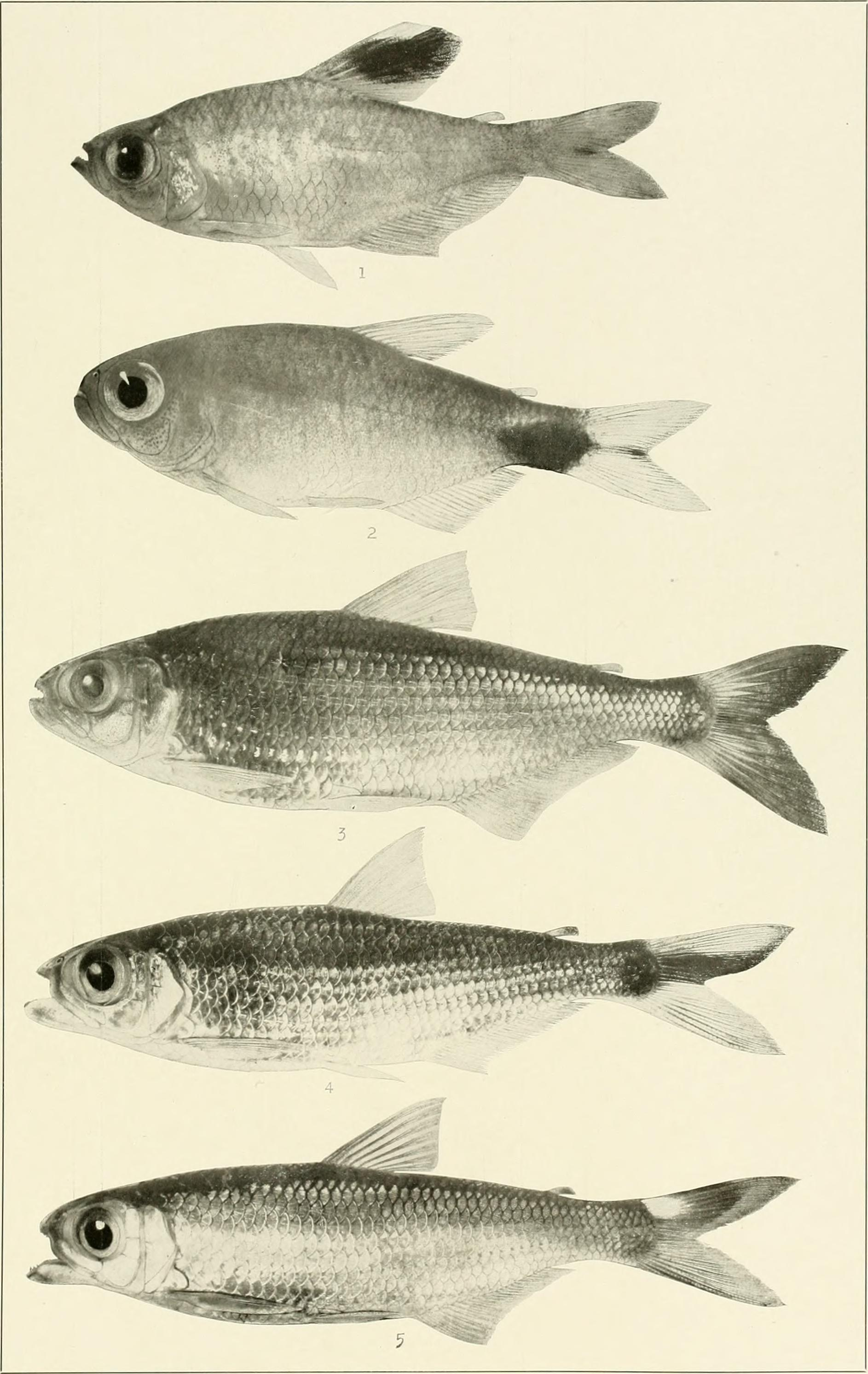
Bryconops affinis is the center fish in this photograph. At the time, it was called Creatochanes affinis.

When first described by Rudolf Kner, the genus Bryconops was classified as a member of the family Characidae, which is an extraordinarily variable family of fishes. However, research from Oliveira et al. in 2011 prompted Bryconops, along with Piabucus and Iguanodectes, to be moved to the family Iguanodectidae, which was revived from the work of ichthyologist Carl H. Eigenmann. Another common name for the orangefin tetra is "orangefin characin", but this is outdated due to the 2011 move, as a characin is any member of Characidae.

== Habitat and ecology ==
Upon describing the species, Günther defined the type locality as Guyana. It is also known from Paraguay, the Amazon, and Rio San Francisco. Furthermore, its range includes the Mamore, Guapore, Tocantins, and Trombetas rivers. Ichthyologist John D. Haseman attributed B. affinis' wide distribution to the fact that it has a more generalist nature than its congeners. It has been mistakenly cited as appearing in Venezuela, but this is not the case. Outside of its native range, it has been added to the Victorian Fisheries Authority's list of noxious aquatic species.

The orangefin tetra is relatively placid, living in the same areas as various other fish species without dispute. It has a known preference for water with a moderate or strong current, where it stays near the surface. Its preference extends to areas with plentiful vegetation, which makes up part of its diet; it also feeds on various invertebrates. While not an active part of the fish market in its native range, it serves as a food source for fishes that are. It is also subject to infestations by gill parasites of the genus Jainus (not to be confused with the sawfly genus Janus).

The orangefin tetra is a batch spawner, releasing batches of eggs over a period of time as opposed to all at once. The eggs adhere to the substrate where they are placed, and this is thought to be a result of structural aspects of the egg (as opposed to an additional substance secreted upon being laid). The zona pediculla, one of the outer layers of the egg, displays structural specializations during formation that likely play a role.

== Conservation status ==
The orangefin tetra is of interest to hobbyists, but it has not been evaluated by the International Union for the Conservation of Nature (IUCN); however, a wide distribution and hardy nature make an endangered status unlikely. Nonetheless, it is known to be exported from Guyana for use in the aquarium industry. Data for less popular species, like B. affinis, is low.
