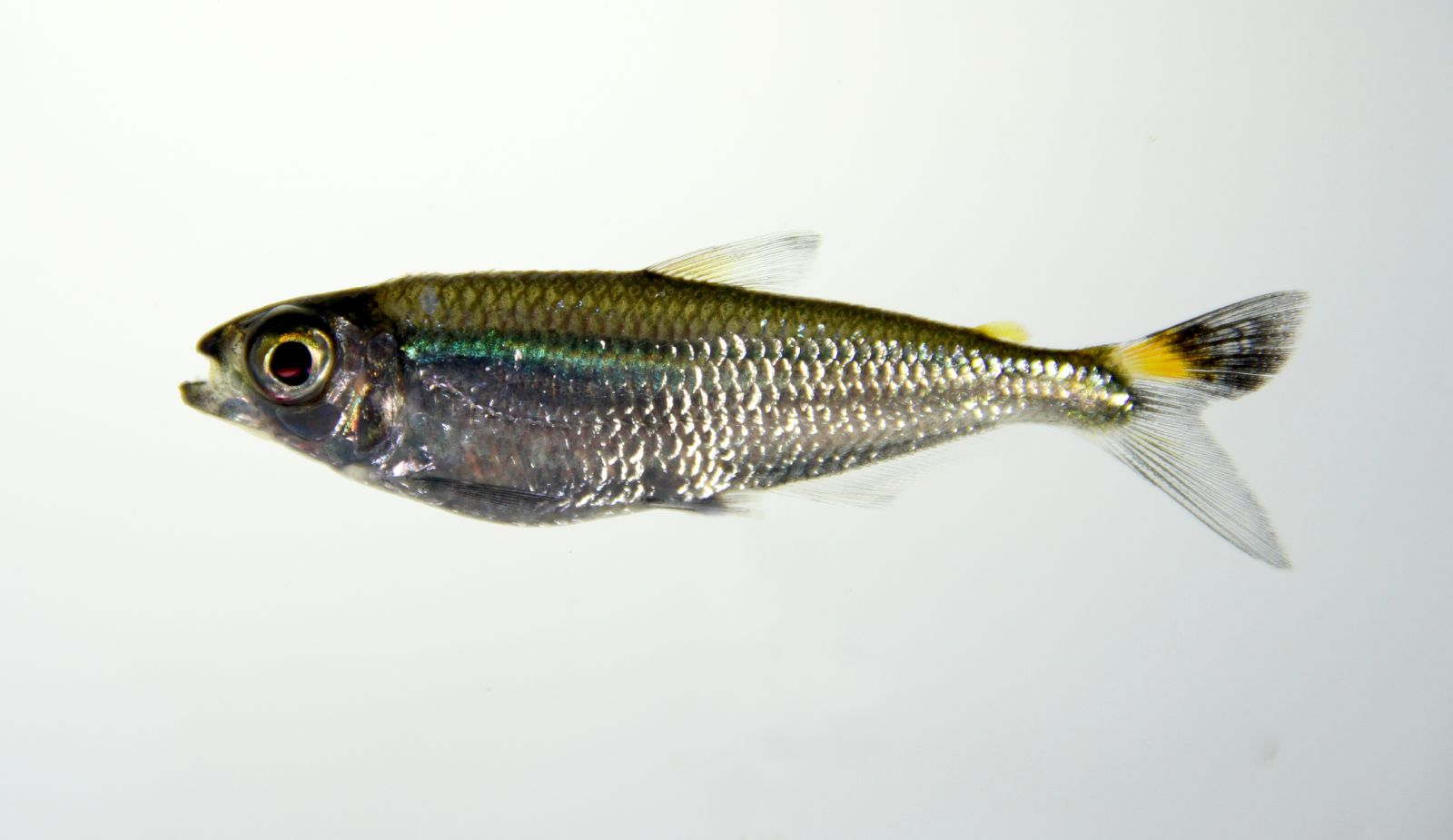

Conservation status
- Least Concern (IUCN 3.1)

Scientific classification
- Kingdom: Animalia
- Phylum: Chordata
- Class: Actinopterygii
- Order: Characiformes
- Family: Iguanodectidae
- Genus: Bryconops
- Species: B. caudomaculatus

Binomial name
- Bryconops caudomaculatus (Günther, 1864)

Synonyms
- Tetragonopterus caudomaculatus Günther, 1864

= Tailspot tetra =

Species of fish

The tailspot tetra (Bryconops caudomaculatus) is a small species of freshwater ray-finned fish belonging to the family Iguanodectidae. This fish is found in the coastal river regions of upper South America. Both its common and scientific names reference the distinct spot of color present on the tail fin, which is one of its defining characteristics. It is a small fish, reaching 4.8 in (12.4 cm) at its longest. Despite its small size, it is an active swimmer, with a preference for fast-flowing waters.

== Description ==
The tailspot tetra, like the rest of the genus Bryconops, has a slender body described as "smelt-like", similar to members of sister genus Piabucus. It reaches 4.8 in (12.4 cm) in total length (with the tail fin included), and a corresponding weight of 20.1 grams. Its back scales are tinted orange to dark-orange, fading into silver on the belly when the fish is alive. Upon close inspection, the scales are also revealed to have a scattering of minute dots.

The spot of bright orange on the basal half of the caudal fin is what gives the tailspot tetra its common name. The scientific name also reflects this - "caudo-" is in reference to the caudal fin (the tail fin), and "-maculatus" means "spotted" (compare with the word "immaculate", which means "without blemishes"). Though it is more vivid in life, this spot of color may turn pale upon preservation of a given specimen.

Visually, the tailspot tetra is easy to confuse with congeners B. magoi and B. collettei, which means that they have often been misidentified as B. caudomaculatus. (This is part of the reason they are considered to be in the same species complex.) Recent congener B. florenceae was also previously misidentified as B. caudomaculatus before its distinction as a separate species.

The lateral line is usually incomplete. Some specimens of B. caudomaculatus display a particularly truncated lateral line that makes them appear more visually similar to B. durbini. Another recently named congener, Bryconops piracolina, is visually similar, but with a difference in the lateral line - it has a smaller number of pored lateral line scales than B. caudomaculatus.

== Taxonomy ==
In 1864, Albert Günther gave the tailspot tetra the scientific name Tetragonopterus caudomaculatus when he first described it as a new species. The genus Tetragonopterus is closely related to the genus Bryconops, and therefore an element of viability remains in Günther's original placement. Ichthyologist Carl H. Eigenmann placed B. caudomaculatus into the genus Creatochanes, which was later classified as a subgenus of Bryconops, to which B. caudomaculatus no longer belongs; Instead, it is considered Bryconops (Bryconops) caudomaculatus.

The tailspot tetra is the type species of the Bryconops caudomaculatus species complex, which includes B. caudomaculatus, B. disruptus, B. durbini, B. collettei, and B. magoi. This complex is not official, but species have been placed in it based upon phenotypic similarities and a history of synonymy with Bryconops caudomaculatus. Due to striking visual similarities and subsequent routine misidentification, B. florenceae (named in 2021) is a candidate for the complex, though this has not been professionally recognized.

The genera Bryconops, Iguanodectes, and Piabucus were previously in the family Characidae, which is incredibly variable and has many genera incertae sedis. In 2011, however, research by Oliveira et al. prompted the three to be moved to the family Iguanodectidae, which was revived from Eigenmann's previous work. The tailspot tetra's classification as a characiform fish in the family Iguanodectidae is its current accepted position.

== Habitat and ecology ==
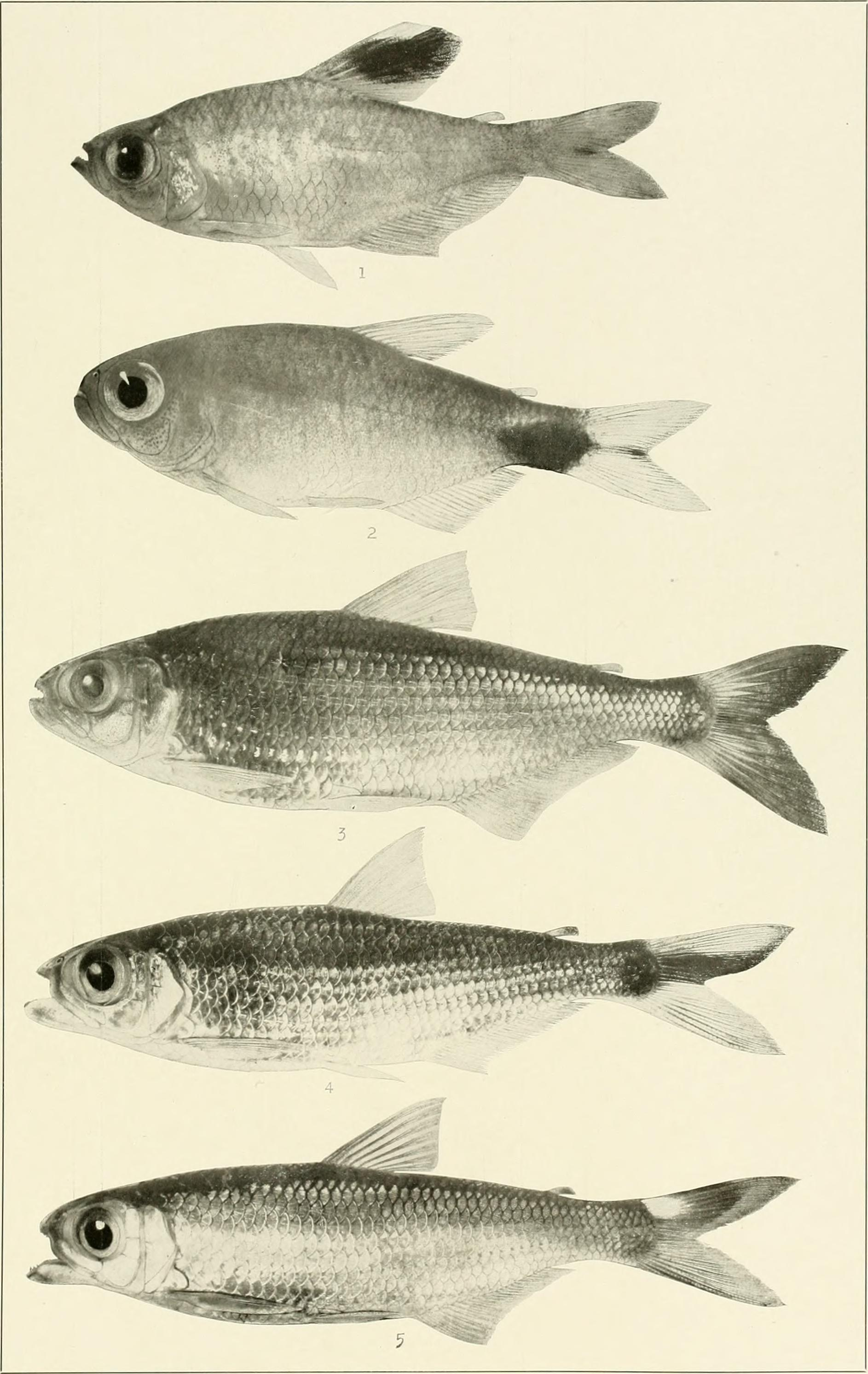
A 1912 illustration of several South American freshwater fishes, with B. caudomaculatus at the bottom

The tailspot tetra is an active swimmer, with a physiology that reflects this despite its small size. Its chosen habitat is also linked to its swimming strength, as it has a noted preference for fast-flowing waters with rocky substrate. It is also not an uncommon sight in a contrasting home - slow-moving blackwater environments. Its morphology differs based upon where it lives (in a running water channel as opposed to a lagoon); studies have shown that examination based upon physical aspects can correctly classify at least 75% of any given specimens' habitats. More of the body weight is shifted backwards for tailspot tetras that live in lagoon habitats, and the mouth is slightly more upturned for channel-dwelling tetras.

A study in January 2022 tested the effects of aluminum in the tailspot tetra's environment, as aluminum is soluble in acidic waters and has been linked to cardiotoxic damage after prolonged exposure. Researchers determined that an aluminum concentration of 3.0 mg/L has a high likelihood of leading to an atrioventricular block in B. caudomaculatus, meaning that the heart's ability to beat effectively gets compromised due to interruption (blockage) of the responsible electrical impulse.

=== Prey and predators ===
As part of its omnivorous diet, the tailspot tetra will actively leap from the water to target flying insects, especially during the twilight hours. It also has a marked taste for insects that have not yet matured, as opposed to the mature terrestrial forms that have moved onto land. It is unknown if varying habitats, and therefore varying morphologies, have a distinct effect on specific diet composition, though it is speculated that this could be the case.

In turn, the tailspot tetra is not only a regular part of the food chain as a source for animals that eat small fish, but it is also preyed upon by parasites. In 2011, B. caudomaculatus was discovered to be the host for a new species of trematode (parasitic flatworm), Auriculostoma foliaceum (which is currently accepted as Creptotrema foliaceum).

=== Conservation status ===
Though the tailspot tetra's conservation status has not been evaluated, it is known to be taken from the wild in places including Guyana, Peru, and Venezuela for export in the aquarium industry, especially in the United Kingdom. Despite this, it remains common in many places, including areas disrupted by the construction of the Balbina Hydroelectric Dam in Brazil. Its ability to adapt to its surroundings combined with a flexible diet make it unlikely to become endangered.
