= Bryconops inpai =

Conservation status
- Least Concern (IUCN 3.1)

Scientific classification
- Kingdom: Animalia
- Phylum: Chordata
- Class: Actinopterygii
- Order: Characiformes
- Family: Iguanodectidae
- Genus: Bryconops
- Species: B. inpai

Binomial name
- Bryconops inpai Knöppel, Junk & Géry, 1968

Species of fish

Bryconops inpai is a species of freshwater ray-finned fish belonging to the family Iguanodectidae. This species is found in rivers in South America. It only lives in two particular river systems - the Casiquiare and Negro - which means that its range is restricted to the northern half of the continent. It has indistinct humeral spots (patches near the pectoral fins), and is bluish-silver in life, which is unusual for members of Bryconops; they are more often plain silver or greenish-silver.

Because it is native to water types with little endemic plant life, most of its diet originates outside of the river system. It primarily preys on insects, such as ants and termites, that fall from trees above the water, and sometimes gets the opportunity to prey on aquatic larvae. Specimens will eat plants if available, mostly seeds and flowers.

== Description ==
Some of the first specimens reached a length of 9.78 cm (3.85 in) in standard length (without the tail fin included). More often than not, however, B. inpai reaches a maximum of 10 cm (3.9 in) in total length (with the tail fin included). This places it slightly above the modal length of Bryconops as a genus (about 7 to 8 cm standard length, 2.1 to 3.8 inches, tail fin not measured). The body is somewhat deep in comparison to related species, similar to B. marabaixo, B. munduruku, and B. cyrtogaster.

Its adipose fin is entirely black, and its caudal fin is dusky, lacking any marks on either lobe. Like many other members of Bryconops, it has two humeral spots near each pectoral fin, though this nonetheless allows it to be differentiated from congeners with one or no spots. Overall, its scales are a bluish-silver (as opposed to plain silver or greenish-silver), which is another trait that sets it apart from other Bryconops. A study in 1993 (Chernoff, Buckup, Machado-Allison, and Royero) noted a few different color patterns in gathered specimens of B. inpai, which points to the possibility of multiple species currently considered synonymous, but further research on the subject has not been done.

== Taxonomy ==
Since its description by Hans-armin Knöppel, Wolfgang Junk, and Jacques Géry in 1968, B. inpai has been considered a member of the subgenus Creatochanes. While Creatochanes itself was once considered a separate genus all on its own, it has since been synonymized with Bryconops and is now considered a subgenus. The high likelihood of such an occurrence was addressed in the original paper describing B. inpai, which is why it was designated as such in the first place.

Bryconops inpai is in the family Iguanodectidae, which is a fairly recent revival (2011) from the work of Carl Eigenmann. Previously, the genus Bryconops was considered a member of the family Characidae, and several resources still list it as such (like ADW and ITIS); however, its current placement is in Iguanodectidae, with Piabucus and Iguanodectes. As such, B. inpai is considered an Iguanodectid fish.

== Habitat and ecology ==
Bryconops inpai is endemic to the Casiquiare and Negro rivers of South America, which are both blackwater rivers. As is the case with many other members of Bryconops, this fondness for a blackwater habitat indicates that B. inpai does not have high-oxygen needs. Blackwater rivers are low in oxygen due to the fact that microbes use much of the available dissolved oxygen in the process of decay, which is what releases tannins into the water and gives it the characteristic color.

Other members of Bryconops found in the Rio Negro include B. disruptus and B. humeralis, the latter of which is also found in the Casiquiare.

=== Diet ===
Bryconops inpai's native range is made up of rivers with very little endemic plant life, which makes it inhospitable to many other species. As such, B. inpai's diet largely consists of terrestrial insects that are washed into the river or fall in from trees hanging above. This is in line with much of the rest of the genus, which is made up mostly of invertivores. B. inpai also takes supplemental plant matter, largely in the form of flowers and seeds (which is also not uncommon in Bryconops).

=== Conservation status ===
Bryconops inpai has not been evaluated by the IUCN. However, its type locality (where it was first discovered) is within a protected region of the Amazon, the Ducke Reserve, and as such it has at least a small portion of territory under surveillance. Nonetheless, the Rio Negro - as with many other rivers - is under threat from environmental hazards as a result of illegal gold mining in South America, which is a booming industry despite its dangers both to participants and to the environment.
