= Antonio Machado-Allison =

- Born: 29 July 1945 (age 81); Caracas, Venezuela
- Education: Central University of Venezuela; The George Washington University
- Occupation: Biologist
- Known for: Biology, biodiversity, biosystematics of freshwater fishes, conservation and sustainable use of continental ecosystems
- Relatives: Carlos Machado-Allison (brother)
- Awards: Silver Apple Award

Antonio Machado-Allison (born 29 July 1945) is a Venezuelan biologist. He graduated with a degree in Biology from the Central University of Venezuela in 1971 and received a Ph.D. from George Washington University in 1982. He is a professor emeritus of the Institute of Zoology and Tropical Ecology (IZET-UCV), specializing in the biology, biodiversity and biosystematics of freshwater fishes, as well as the conservation and sustainable use of continental ecosystems. He has also taught at the College of the Environment at Wesleyan University in Connecticut, United States. He is the brother of fellow biologist Carlos Machado-Allison.

== Education and academic career ==
Machado-Allison began his teaching career at the Central University of Venezuela, Faculty of Sciences, in 1971 as a Zoologist III and became an instructor in 1973. He subsequently rose through the university's academic ranks, reaching the highest rank of full professor in 1991. During his career at the university, he held several administrative positions, including head of department, faculty and university council faculty representative, director of the Biology Museum, coordinator of the Council for Scientific and Humanistic Development (CDCH), and manager of Research Centers and Free Chairs within the Academic Vice-Rectorate. He held the latter position until 2018. He subsequently moved to the United States and taught at Wesleyan University. He has also continued his work as an associate researcher and postgraduate instructor in Zoology at the Institute of Zoology and Tropical Ecology of the Central University of Venezuela.

He has served on the board of the Venezuelan Council for Scientific and Technological Research (CONICIT) and has been a member of its Superior Council, as well as of the National Councils for Limnology, Wildlife, and Fisheries and Aquaculture of the Ministry of the Environment. He has served as editor and co-editor of several national and international scientific journals. He has also been an associate researcher at the American Museum of Natural History in New York, the Field Museum of Natural History in Chicago, and the Smithsonian Institution in Washington, D.C.

His work in fish evolution, aquatic ecology, and environmental impact assessment led to his election as a full member (Chair III) of the Academy of Physical, Mathematical and Natural Sciences of Venezuela. He was librarian of the Academy from 2003 to 2005 and served as its academic secretary from 2005 to 2019. He was president of the Foundation of the Academy (FUDECI) from 2005 and president of the Foundation of the Palace of the Academies from 2012; these terms ended in 2018 according to the original biography. He has subsequently remained a member of the Academy's board and of FUDECI and is also a member of the Latin American Academy of Sciences.

== Career and research ==
As of 2024, Machado-Allison had authored more than one hundred scientific papers and books dealing with systematics, evolution, ecology, and conservation of fishes and continental aquatic environments, as well as environmental impact studies. His research has focused particularly on the diversity and conservation of freshwater fishes in Venezuela and South America. The Council for Scientific and Humanistic Development of the Central University of Venezuela (CDCH-UCV) published his book Los peces de los llanos de Venezuela: un ensayo sobre su historia natural.

He is a member of several scientific societies and has collaborated with the Venezuelan Fish Foundation. He has received numerous national and international distinctions, including the Silver Apple Award in the United States for work related to biodiversity in Venezuela.

== Selected publications ==
- Machado-Allison, Antonio, and William Fink. Los peces caribes de Venezuela: Diagnosis, claves, aspectos ecológicos y evolutivos. Ediciones CDCH, Colección Monografías, 1996.
- Machado-Allison, Antonio. Los peces de los llanos de Venezuela: Un ensayo sobre su historia natural. Ediciones CDCH, Colección Estudios, 2005. The work has subsequently been reissued in revised editions; a digital edition was published jointly by the Central University of Venezuela and the Academy of Physical, Mathematical and Natural Sciences.
- Machado-Allison, Antonio, and Alexis Rodríguez-Acosta. Animales venenosos y ponzoñosos de Venezuela: un manual para el mejor conocimiento biomédico de los accidentes ocasionados por animales venenosos. Ediciones CDCH, Colección Estudios, 2005, 108 pp.
- Machado-Allison, Antonio, and E. Buroz, eds. Desarrollo de los estudios ambientales en Venezuela 2000-2012. Academy of Physical, Mathematical and Natural Sciences, Technical Advisory Commission on the Environment, 2015, 382 pp.
- Bifano, C.; Bonalde, I.; Machado-Allison, A.; Machado-Allison, C.; Mostany, J.; Paz, J. L.; and Pujol, F. La institucionalización de la ciencia en Venezuela, pp. 167–254. In La pérdida de la institucionalidad en Venezuela. Inter-Academic Committee, Palace of the Academies, Caracas, 2015.
- Fink, William, and Antonio Machado-Allison. "Three new species of piranhas from Brazil and Venezuela." Ichthyological Exploration of Freshwaters, 2(1): 57–75, 1992.
- Cione, Alberto; Dahdul, Wasila; Lundberg, John; and Antonio Machado-Allison. "Megapiranha paranensis, a new genus and species of Serrasalminae (Characidae, Teleostei) from the Upper Miocene of Argentina." Journal of Vertebrate Paleontology, 29(2): 350–358, 2009.
- Machado-Allison, Antonio. "Mining in Venezuela: its effects on the environment and human health", pp. 347–362. In Cristiano Araujo and Candida Shin (eds.), Ecotoxicology in Latin America, Section 2: Environmental Risk in Freshwater Ecosystems. Nova Publishers, 2017, 591 pp.
- Lasso, Carlos, and Antonio Machado-Allison. Sinopsis de las especies de la Familia Cichlidae presentes en la Cuenca del Río Orinoco. Claves, diagnosis, aspectos bio-ecológicos e ilustraciones. 2nd digital edition. Serie Peces de Venezuela. Centro Museo, Institute of Zoology and Tropical Ecology (UCV); Museum of Natural History La Salle; Alexander von Humboldt Biological Resources Research Institute, Bogotá; and College of the Environment, Wesleyan University, Connecticut.
- Lasso, Carlos A.; Machado-Allison, Antonio; Pérez-Díaz, Carlos E.; and Faccini-Martínez, Álvaro A., eds. Guía biomédica: Exposición con animales acuáticos en el norte de Sudamérica y el Caribe. Alexander von Humboldt Institute and Grupo Soul, Bogotá, Colombia.
