= Animal Diversity Web =

Online database

The Animal Diversity Web (ADW) is a non-profit group that hosts an online database site that collects natural history, classification, species characteristics, conservation biology, and distribution information on species of animals. The website includes photographs, sound clips, and a virtual museum.

The local, relational database is written and maintained by staff and student contributors from the University of Michigan. It can be accessed through the web and mobile apps. It offers resources for schoolteachers ("K–12 instructors"), and functions as a virtual museum containing mostly mammals and a collection of skulls that can be virtually handled.

== Background ==
The ADW was created in 1995 by Philip Myers, a former biology professor at the University of Michigan. As of June 2022, the site contained records for approximately 2,150 animal species, represented by 11,500 images and 725 sounds. The ADW has over 250 accounts of higher taxonomic groups.

Most of the contributors to the website are undergraduate students. ADW has collaborated with 30 colleges and universities across the United States. The undergraduate students often submit reports on species as part of their course requirements. Each account is edited by both the professors and the staff at the ADW. As of November 2017, the Animal Diversity Web had 3,675 contributors.

== Staff ==
The current staff of the Animal Diversity Web is employed at the University of Michigan (as of 2017):

- Phil Myers, Ph.D.: Director and founder of the Animal Diversity Web. Curator of Mammals in the Museum of Zoology and Professor of Ecology and Evolutionary Biology.
- Tricia Jones, Ph.D.: Educational researcher, assessment and usability coordinator, and site design consultant.
- Roger Espinosa, M.S.: Technical lead in content management, XML templates, search engines, and taxonomy database.
- Tanya Dewey, Ph.D.: Content expert, curriculum consultant, and ADW upkeep.
- George Hammond, M.S.: Content expert, curriculum consultant, and ADW upkeep.
