= Humeral spot =

Marking near the shoulder on some fish and insects

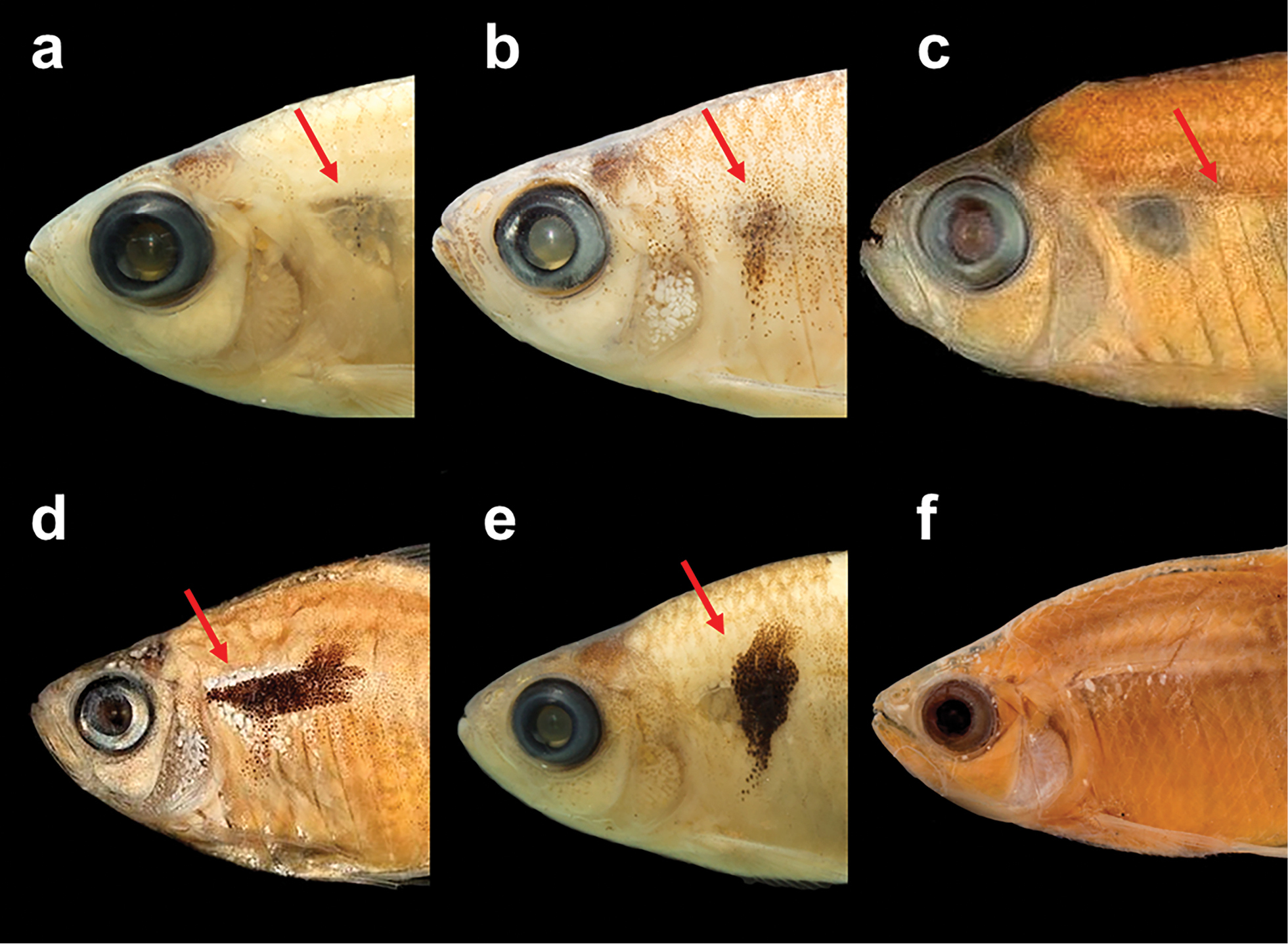
Humeral spots on species of Hyphessobrycon

Humeral spot (from Latin humerus, pertaining to the shoulder) is a mark or pattern found on several species of fish, typically above the pectoral fin.

In insects, the humeral spot may be found on the costal area of the wing.
