= Piracicaba River (Minas Gerais) =

Watercourse in Minas Gerais, Brazil

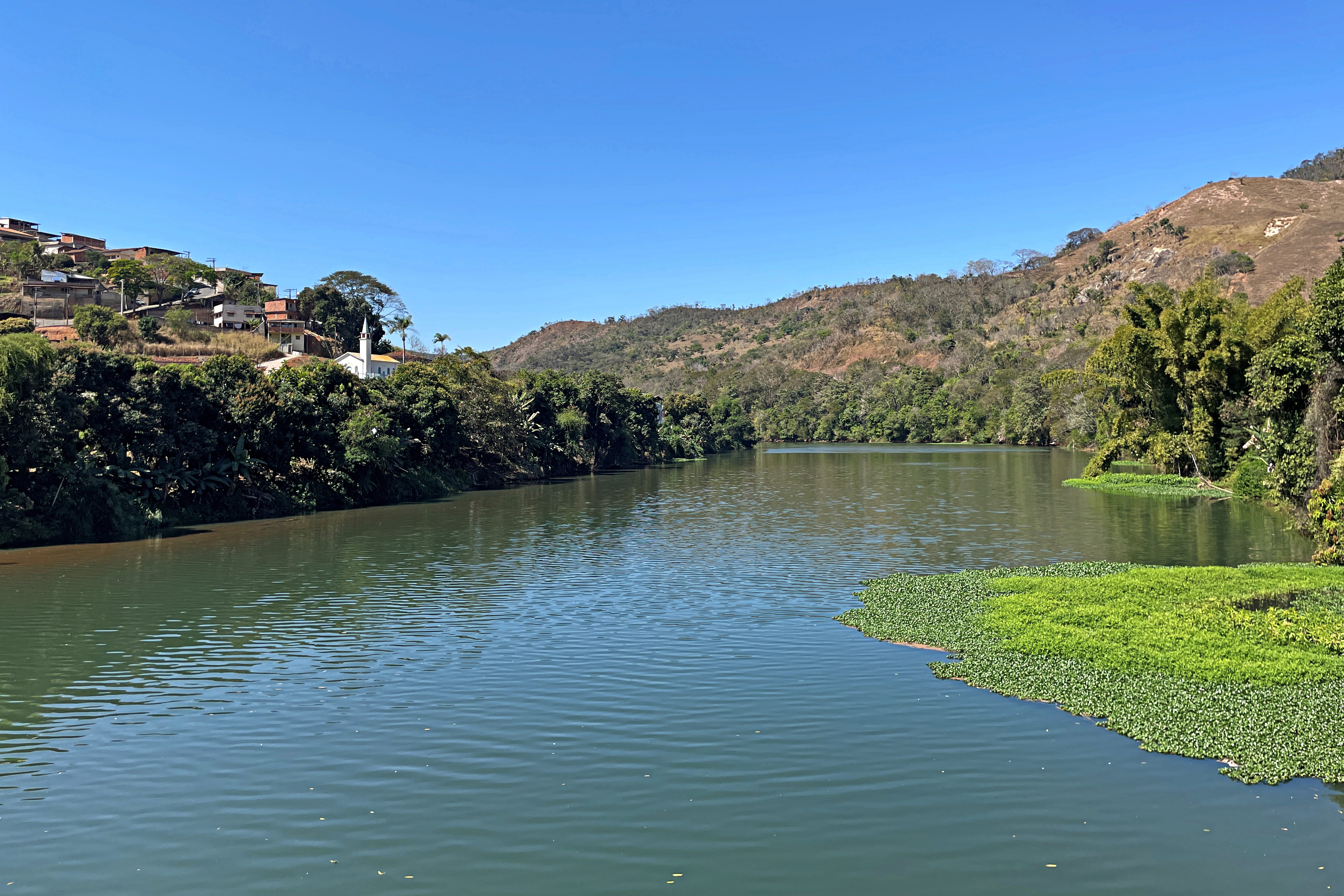
- Piracicaba River in Antônio Dias

- Mouth location in Brazil
- Native name: Rio Piracicaba (Portuguese)

Location
- Country: Brazil

Physical characteristics
- Source
  - location: Minas Gerais state
- Mouth: Doce River, between Timóteo and Ipatinga
  - coordinates: 19°29′31″S 42°30′57″W
  - elevation: 1,680 metres (5,510 ft)
- Length: 241 kilometres (150 mi)
- Basin size: 5,465.38 square kilometres (2,110.20 sq mi)

Basin features
- River system: Doce River
- Tributaries
  - left: Peixe, Maquiné and Santa Bárbara rivers
  - right: Prata River and Turvo stream

The Piracicaba River (pronounced [piɾasiˈkabɐ]) is a watercourse of Minas Gerais state in southeastern Brazil. It is a tributary of the Doce River. The river rises at an altitude of 1,680 metres (5,510 ft), at one of the vertices of the Caraça mountain range, in the São Bartolomeu district. It runs for 241 km to its mouth on the Doce river, between Ipatinga and Timóteo. Its main tributaries are the Prata, Peixe, Maquiné and Santa Bárbara rivers and the Turvo stream. The basin covers 5,465.38 km^{2} (2,110.20 square miles) of drainage area and a total of 21 municipalities.

The first settlements along the river's banks began at the end of the 17th century during the gold mining boom in Minas Gerais, which led to the foundation of settlements in Ouro Preto and Mariana. Although mining was developed in the Iron Quadrangle in the following centuries, urbanisation in the basin area was only consolidated in the 20th century, after the EFVM was leased. The railway, near the river, led to the emergence of urban centres. At the same time, the availability of forests for timber extraction and water supply from the river encouraged the installation of metallurgy companies in João Monlevade and the current Steel Valley, driving demographic and economic growth.

Thus, the Piracicaba River crosses a region with a notable presence of industrial activity, especially mining and steelmaking, supplying some of the local industrial plants and hydroelectric power stations. On the other hand, the riverbed suffers severely from siltation, deforestation, the proliferation of eucalyptus monoculture, low coverage by riparian forests and the receipt of untreated urban effluents, making it one of the most degraded tributaries of the Doce River.

== Etymology ==
The most popular version for the origin of the river's name is that the term "Piracicaba" was borrowed from Tupi-Guarani and interpreted as "place where the fish stop". This would be an allusion to the significant number of small falls found in some sections of the riverbed, especially in the Antônio Dias region, which disrupt the fish traffic. This argument also explains the origin of the São Paulo Piracicaba River's name. Another popular version states that "Piracicaba" in Tupi-Guarani means "river without fish", but the application of this interpretation to the Piracicaba River is questionable, given that in the past it was a river with plenty of fish.

== History ==
=== Exploration and mining ===
The region between the mouths of the Piracicaba and Manhuaçu Rivers, i.e. between Ipatinga and Aimorés, was originally inhabited by the Aimoré peoples. Attempts to explore the Doce River Valley in search of mineral riches began in the 16th century, but were unsuccessful, which ended up delaying the settlement of the area. The expedition of Sebastião Fernandes Tourinho (1573) entered the course of the Doce River and some of its tributaries, calling the region at the mouth of the Piracicaba River the ‘Green Valley’, due to the dense forest.

Towards the end of the 17th century, the discovery of gold at the headwaters of Das Velhas and Piracicaba rivers, in Ouro Preto, encouraged expeditions of bandeirantes from São Paulo to explore those areas and then explore downstream. The search for gold led to the establishment of settlements in Ouro Preto and Mariana. In the early 18th century there were also settlements on the Piracicaba river banks in Catas Altas, Santa Bárbara, Nova Era (formerly São José da Lagoa), Rio Piracicaba (formerly São Miguel do Rio Piracicaba) and Antônio Dias. In addition to mineral extraction, cattle ranches and small factories could be found along the river. Mining was Brazil's main economic activity in the 18th century, but its rise led to the first environmental impacts on the rivers in the affected areas, including the Piracicaba.

=== Colonisation progress ===
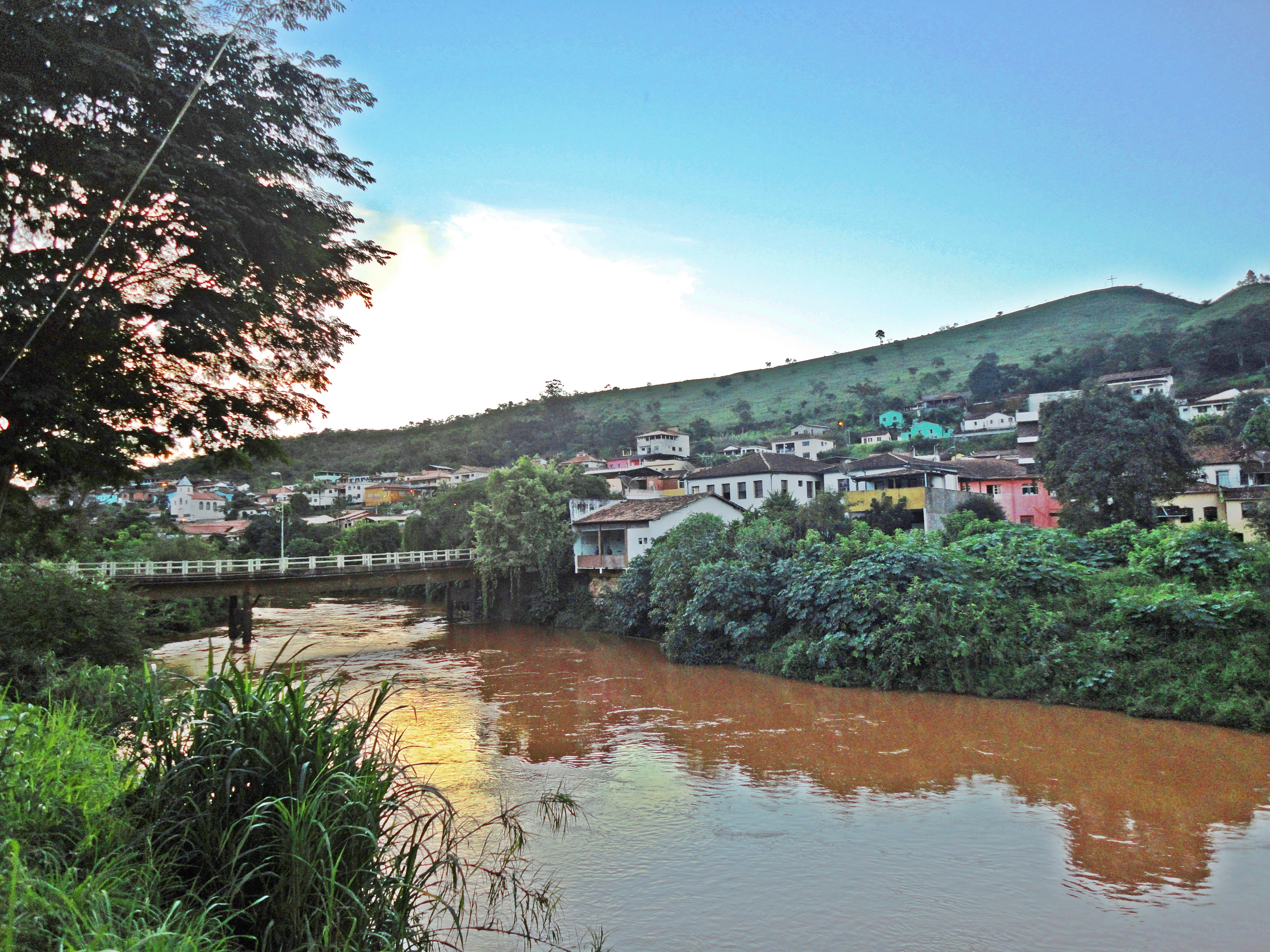
Piracicaba River in Rio Piracicaba, one of the oldest settlements on its banks

The Rio Doce Valley used to be on a route for the precious stones mined in the central region of Minas Gerais, linking the Royal Road in Diamantina to the coast of Espírito Santo for export. As a result, the royal crown banned settlement and new roads in the region to prevent the gold from being smuggled down the Doce River and its tributaries, such as the Piracicaba. In an attempt to keep outsiders away, the lands were described as having dense vegetation and venomous animals, with a predominance of the ferocious Aimoré. However, settlement was authorised in 1755, after Minas Gerais experienced a decline in gold production. Despite the decline in gold availability, the mineral diversity fuelled the maintenance of mining activity in the Ouro Preto region, including in the Piracicaba riverbed, over the following centuries.

Once settlement was authorised, the Aimoré were massacred so that outsiders could conquer the land. Under these circumstances, native attacks on settlements became constant, forcing the colonists to abandon their farms and livestock. The natives, in turn, faced military punishments, such as the expedition of Luís Diogo Lobo da Silva in the 1760s, then governor of the Captaincy of Minas Gerais. The administrator and his troop of 150 armed men navigated the rivers Piracicaba and Doce as far as Cuité (now Conselheiro Pena) in an act of repression against the natives. In the early 19th century, "barracks" were built to reinforce protection of the settlers. Despite the ban on attacks on natives in 1831, the original population was almost extinct, which served as an encouragement to colonisation. However, this process was relatively slow. It's worth noting that in 1821, the only settlement downstream of Antônio Dias before the mouth of the Piracicaba River was Alegre, now Timóteo.

It wasn't until the construction of the Vitória-Minas Railway (EFVM) that occupation of the region began to pick up. The railway started in Vitória, Espírito Santo, and its initial objective was to reach Diamantina, but to transport iron ore the focus was shifted to Itabira when work was already underway. The establishment of railway stations resulted in a number of urban centres throughout the first half of the 20th century. The railway follows the course of the Doce and Piracicaba rivers for the majority of its length, resulting in increased population growth on the banks of these rivers. As a result, environmental transformations in the region intensified. This process was aggravated from the 1930s onwards, when large areas of native Atlantic Forest in the basin were deforested for the extraction of timber and the production of charcoal to supply the Belgo-Mineira industrial complex in João Monlevade. The exploitation was managed from Calado, now Coronel Fabriciano, located on the banks of the Piracicaba River. The same company also used the river to generate the energy that powered the plant.

=== Urbanisation and environmental degradation ===
The existence of a railway, watercourses and forests for timber extraction were decisive factors in the establishment of Acesita in Timóteo in 1944 and Usiminas in Ipatinga, near Coronel Fabriciano in 1956. In 1951, to provide the company with electricity, Acesita built the Sá Carvalho Hydroelectric Power Station, located on the Piracicaba River in Antônio Dias, the largest hydroelectric power station in Minas Gerais at the time. The construction of the steel mills led to sudden urban and population growth in the region, which was no longer known as Vale Verde and was renamed Vale do Aço (Steel Valley). This resulted in the construction of workers‘ villages in the companies’ towns, infrastructure and increased deforestation.

Reports from long-time residents indicate that fish were abundant in the Piracicaba River during the 20th century. Near the old Calado station in the centre of Fabriciano, for example, fishermen would gather every afternoon and leave with bags full of fish. On some occasions, more than 300 people would gather near the river. In Antônio Dias, fishing yielded traíras, piaus, piabanhas, surubins, cascudos and freshwater lobsters. The river was also used for transport and leisure by the riverside towns. Records indicate that hundreds of evangelical church members were collectively baptised in the waters of the riverbed in Coronel Fabriciano until the early 1970s.

Throughout the second half of the 20th century, the urban centres of João Monlevade and the Steel Valley kept growing due to industrialisation, as well as the expansion of eucalyptus monoculture to meet the needs of the power plants. Consequently, the dumping of urban and industrial effluents into the waters was intensified, a situation aggravated by the construction of new hydroelectric power stations along the river, extensive land use and mining. Flooding was also a major problem thanks to unbridled occupation of risk areas. On the other hand, there have been some efforts to reduce degradation, such as the implementation of riparian forest along the river mouth by Usiminas in the 1990s; the creation of the Piracicaba River Basin Committee (CBH) under the State Water Resources Policy on 17 February 2000; and the construction of wastewater treatment stations in some cities. However, the situation remained critical in the first decades of the 21st century, due to siltation caused by mining, pollution and severe droughts.

== Geographical aspects ==
=== Drainage and climate ===
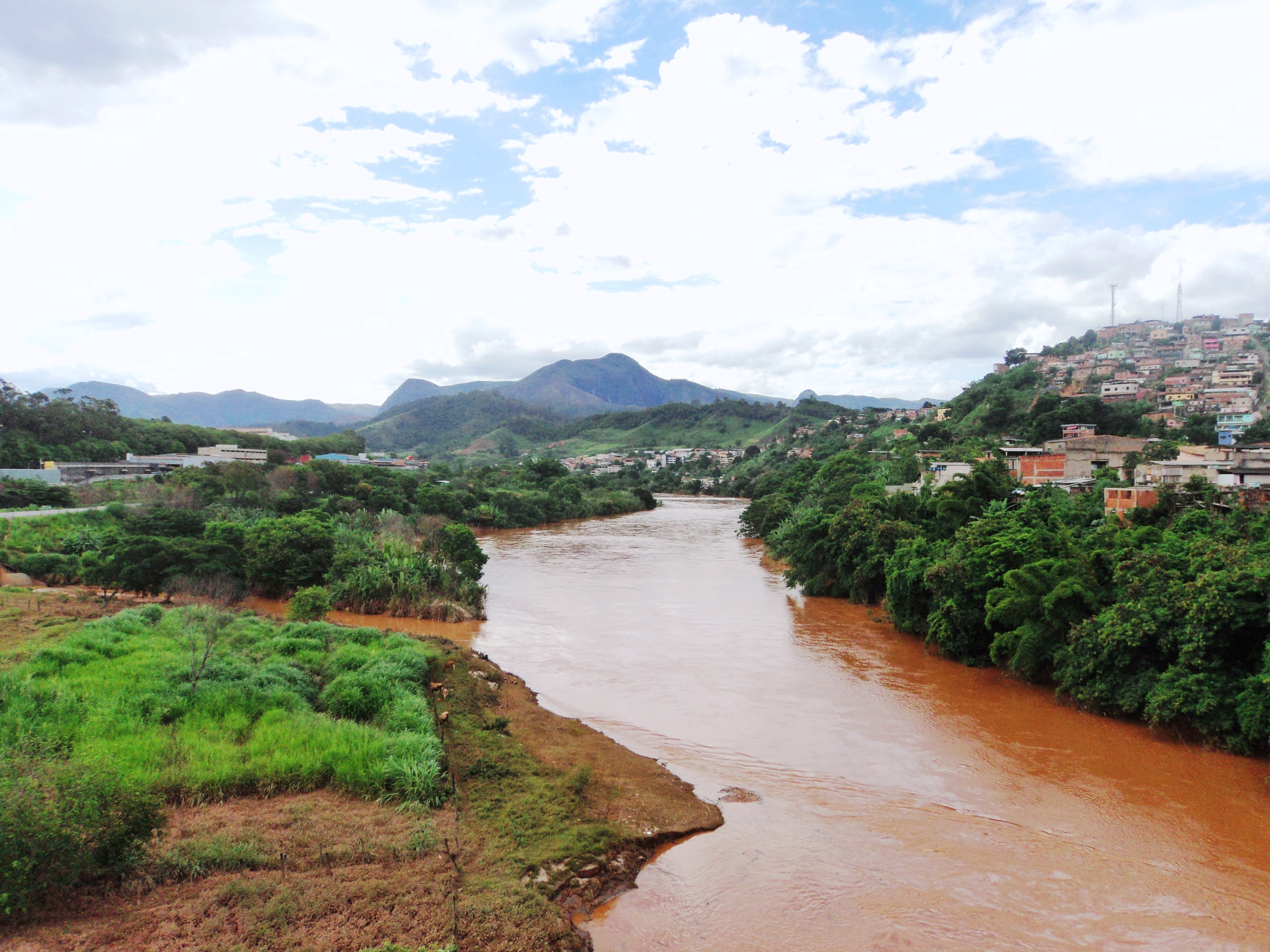
Muddy waters in the Piracicaba River with high levels between Timóteo and Coronel Fabriciano, after weeks of heavy rainfall in December.

The Piracicaba River rises on one of the peaks of the Caraça mountain range at an altitude of 1,680 metres (5,510 ft) metres, in the district of São Bartolomeu, which belongs to Ouro Preto. It runs for a total of 241 kilometres to its mouth on the left bank of the Doce River, of which it is one of the main tributaries, between the municipalities of Ipatinga and Timóteo, at an altitude of 210 metres. For most of its course, the river flows in a north-easterly direction. Its drainage basin is part of the Doce River Basin and covers 5,465.38 square kilometres (2,110.20 sq mi) of drainage area, which is made up of the sub-basins of the Peixe and Santa Bárbara rivers on the left bank and the sub-basin of the Prata river on the right bank. Other major tributaries include the Maquiné and the Turvo rivers. In addition to these major rivers, the Piracicaba River is fed by about 100 streams and creeks.

The climate in the basin transitions between tropical (Aw, according to the Köppen-Geiger climate classification), hot-summer mesothermal (Cwa) and mild-summer mesothermal (Cwb), and is influenced by continentality and altitude. During the winter months, the presence of the South Atlantic High favours the dominance of high pressure, preventing humidity from rising and thus creating the dry season. This period also includes the intrusion of polar air masses, which make it difficult for temperatures to rise and squall lines to form. In summer, on the other hand, temperatures rise and the influence of tropical instabilities creates the rainy season. The headwaters region, with the Cwb climate classification, has the highest average precipitation due to the incidence of orographic rainfall, reaching 1,500 millimetres (mm) a year. The Cwa classification, on the other hand, is found in most of the basin, in its central area. The Aw climate is recorded in the Steel Valley, at the mouth of the Piracicaba River, accompanied by the lowest average annual rainfall, which is 1,000 mm.

The long-term average flow of the Piracicaba River, based on measurements from the Mário Carvalho fluviometer station in Antônio Dias, is 97.90 cubic metres per second (m^{3}/s). During the dry season, the flow is significantly reduced, the lowest average month being September, with 49.7 m^{3}/s. From October onwards, as the rainy season begins, the flow intensifies and reaches its highest average in January, with 189.5 m^{3}/s. According to records between 1970 and 2010, the highest annual average occurred in 1979, with over 160 m^{3}/s. At the beginning of that year, massive floods hit the entire Doce River basin. Another year with a high average flow was 1985, with more than 150 m^{3}/s. On the other hand, the lowest flow during this period occurred in 1990, when the annual average was close to 50 m^{3}/s. The history of flood-related problems led to the installation of a series of rain gauge and fluviometer stations on the rivers in the basin, which are managed by the National Water Agency (ANA) and which aim to warn the population of possible overflows. This network is part of the warning system for the Doce River basin. It is worth noting that during the rainy season it is also common for water turbidity to rise, due to the faster current and the intensified movement of sediment, humus and plankton.

=== Geology and geomorphology ===
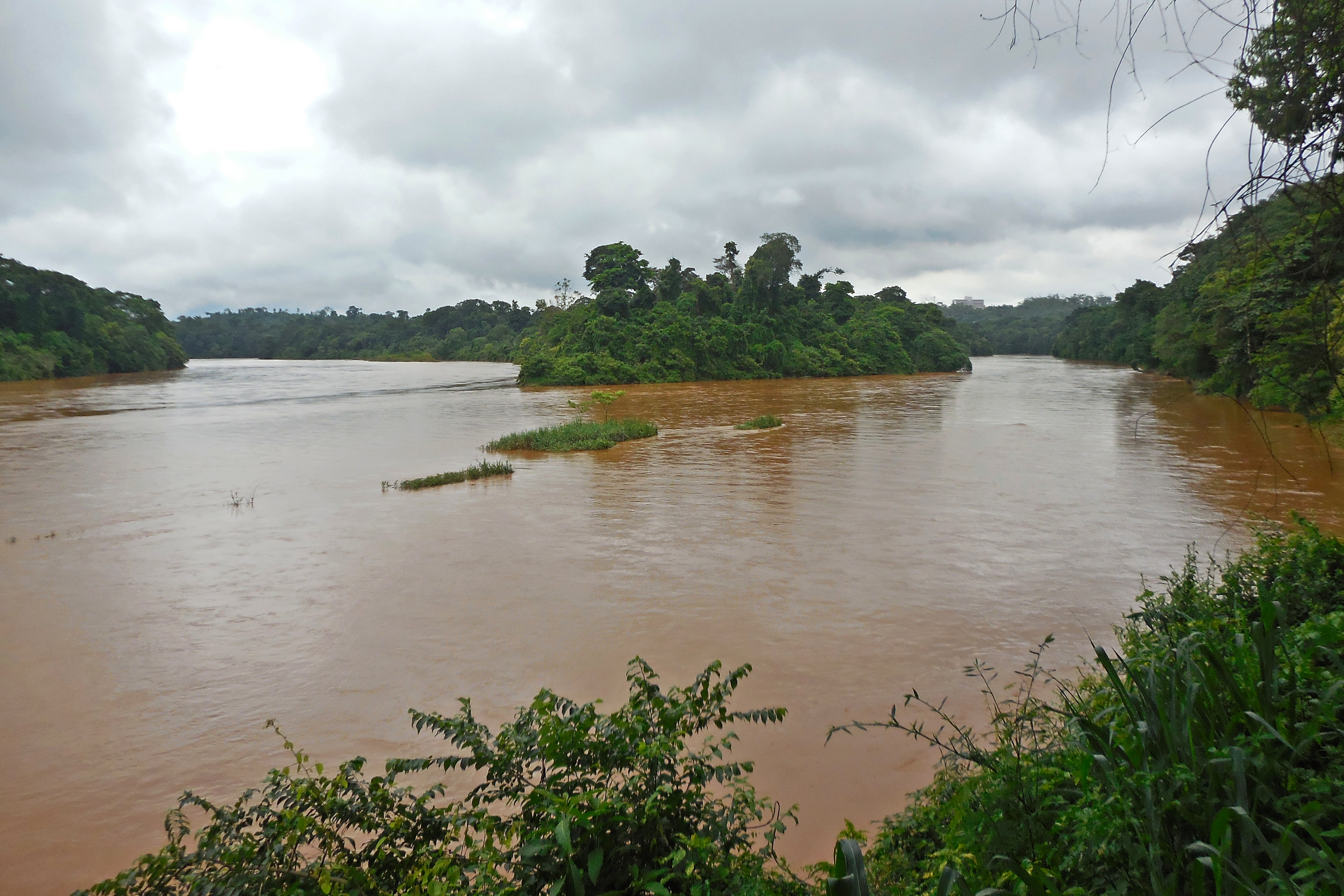
The mouth of the Piracicaba River (right) into the Doce River (left) from the Pedra Mole Station viewpoint in Ipatinga.

There are two important geological units in the Piracicaba river basin: the Iron Quadrangle and the crystalline basement. The first one is made up of rocks from four formations: the granite-gneiss complex, the rio das velhas supergroup, the minas supergroup and the itacolomi group. The second is made up of crystalline rocks of intrusive formation, consisting of granite-gneiss and magmatic rocks. The relief is considerably rugged, predominantly mountains and hills, and for this reason the river's course is characterised by steep gradients that form small waterfalls and rapids. However, these falls are interspersed with stretches of sandy bottom, which create a calm current.

The headwaters of the spring have the highest altitudes in the basin, reaching 2,068 kilometres (1,285 mi) at the Sol peak, in the Caraça mountain range. This is considered an enclave of the Espinhaço mountain range in the middle of the Iron Quadrangle due to its similar characteristics and lies to the south-west of the drainage area. The Espinhaço mountain range, to the northwest of the basin, forms a natural divide between the Piracicaba and São Francisco basins. Downstream, the river intersects the dissected plateaus of south-central and eastern Minas Gerais, which occupy most of the area and have an undulating relief, the so-called ‘mares de morros’. The territory of the drainage area also has clear Valleys, such as the Steel Valley.

Soils of the cambisols, acrisols and latosols classes are prevalent in the basin. The cambisols are restricted to the areas where the Piracicaba and Santa Bárbara rivers flow, and are characterised as mineral, well-drained soils that are restricted to agricultural exploitation due to their hilly terrain. The acrisols are found to the north-west, also in an area of hilly terrain. Although it is a type of soil prone to grazing and agriculture, it is volatile to erosion when exposed to intense rainfall in undulating or mountainous terrain, which is why its use in the basin is more suited to silviculture. Latosol, on the other hand, is deep and well-drained and occupies most of the dissected plateaus. In the region around the Piracicaba river mouth, in particular, yellow latosols are found, an acidic variety with low fertility. Among these classes, the argissolo is the most prone to erosion and the latossolo the least.

Around 96% of the basin's area lies above fissured aquifers, 44% of which are over fissured aquifers in crystalline rocks, which are isolated from each other and small in extent. Their wells are between 30 and 150 metres deep. A further 36% are located above schistose fissured aquifers, which are also discontinuous and small, but with even more limited use due to the shale. In 16% of the area, there are quartzite fissured aquifer systems, favourable for the extraction of drinking water. The wells in this classification are 60 to 250 metres deep and are distributed in localised but larger systems. The remaining 4% of the basin's total area is made up of granular aquifers, which are large and considered to be the most favourable for exploitation. With wells ranging from five to 20 metres, this type is found in the Steel Valley Metropolitan Region, where it serves as the main source of public water supply.

Susceptibility to erosion is classified as "strong" or "very strong" in 66% of the basin area, a trait that is particularly accentuated at the headwaters of the Santa Bárbara river sub-basin and at the headwaters of the Piracicaba itself. The headwaters are where the highest sediment production occurs, with an average of 100 to 200 tonnes per square kilometre per year (t/km^{2}). Industrialised mining in the headwaters region contributes to sediment formation, facilitating siltation. Heavy rainfall events and prolonged droughts naturally intensify the erosion process. Downstream of the confluence of the Piracicaba and Doce rivers, sediment generation is relatively low, at around 50 t/km^{2} per year, but the Piracicaba river basin is one of the largest sediment producers in the Doce river basin.

=== Biodiversity and soil use ===
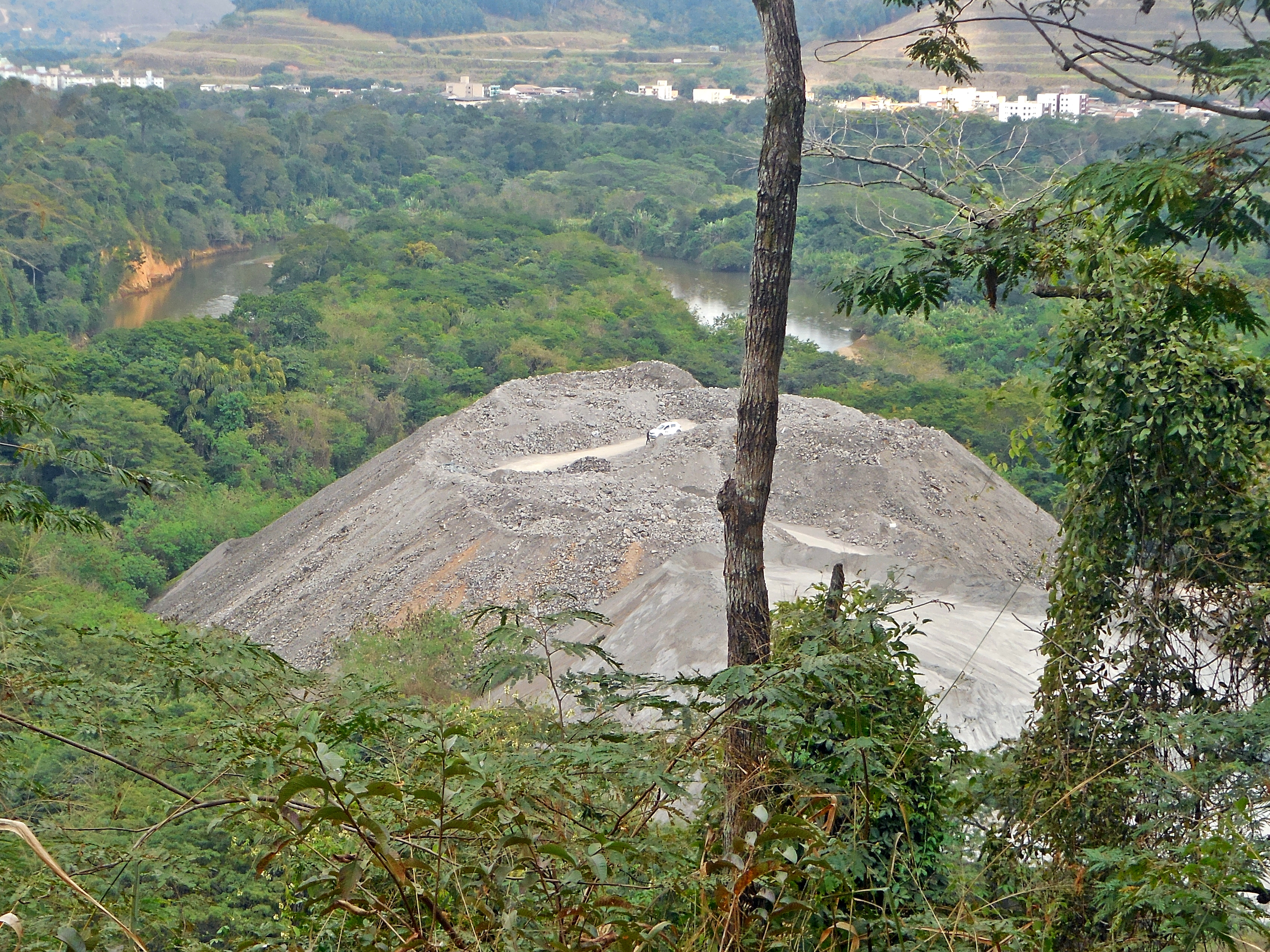
Usiminas silicon slag deposit in Ipatinga, with the Piracicaba river in the background.

The original predominant biome in the basin area is the Atlantic Forest, with a small representation of the Cerrado at the western end. In the Espinhaço mountain range, due to the altitude, the vegetation becomes variable with altitude fields and rupestrian grasslands in association with the Cerrado. However, the land cover has changed considerably due to the economic activities carried out in the region, especially in the Steel Valley Metropolitan Region, which is one of the state's main steel hubs. In addition, the land has been used for livestock farming and eucalyptus reforestation, although most of the native forest was cleared during the 20th century as a result of farming and timber extraction for charcoal production. Later, these areas were used to grow eucalyptus. Out of the total area of the basin, around 48.88% is made up of pasture, 35.7% of seasonal semi-deciduous forest, 7.56% of reforestation, 2.3% of crops and towns, 0.36% of water bodies, 0.29% of savannah, 0.02% of dense ombrophilous forest and 4.89% of other uses. It should be emphasised, however, that the percentage of natural forest cover is distributed in isolated spots in non-devastated areas.

According to 2011 data, the Piracicaba River's fish fauna is made up of around 40 species, less than half of the 99 reported in the Doce River basin. The environmental transformations undergone by the basin region throughout its history have caused a significant reduction in the availability of species. The piau-vermelho (Leporinus copelandii) is an example that could be found until the 1930s, while the pipitinga was more popular until the 1970s, although rare specimens of both can still be found. Natural river rapids and hydroelectric power stations are also obstacles that interfere with the flow and distribution of fish. The reduction in variety led to the introduction of foreign species by the local population from the 20th century onwards, known as peixamentos. The first of these was the introduction of the mandí-amarelo, brought from the Paraná river basin in 1961. This process was often uncontrolled, generating conflicts with native species, such as competition between fish and predation. Surveillance is carried out in some places that are frequently used for fishing, as it has been in the Guilman Amorim HPP lake since the 90s. In addition, most of the species used for fishing in the river are exotic, particularly carp, dorado and tilapia. Other examples of species found are catfish, pearl cichlid, cascudo, cumbaca, lambari, muçum, sarapó, traíra and trairão.

== Socio-economic participation ==
=== Demographics ===
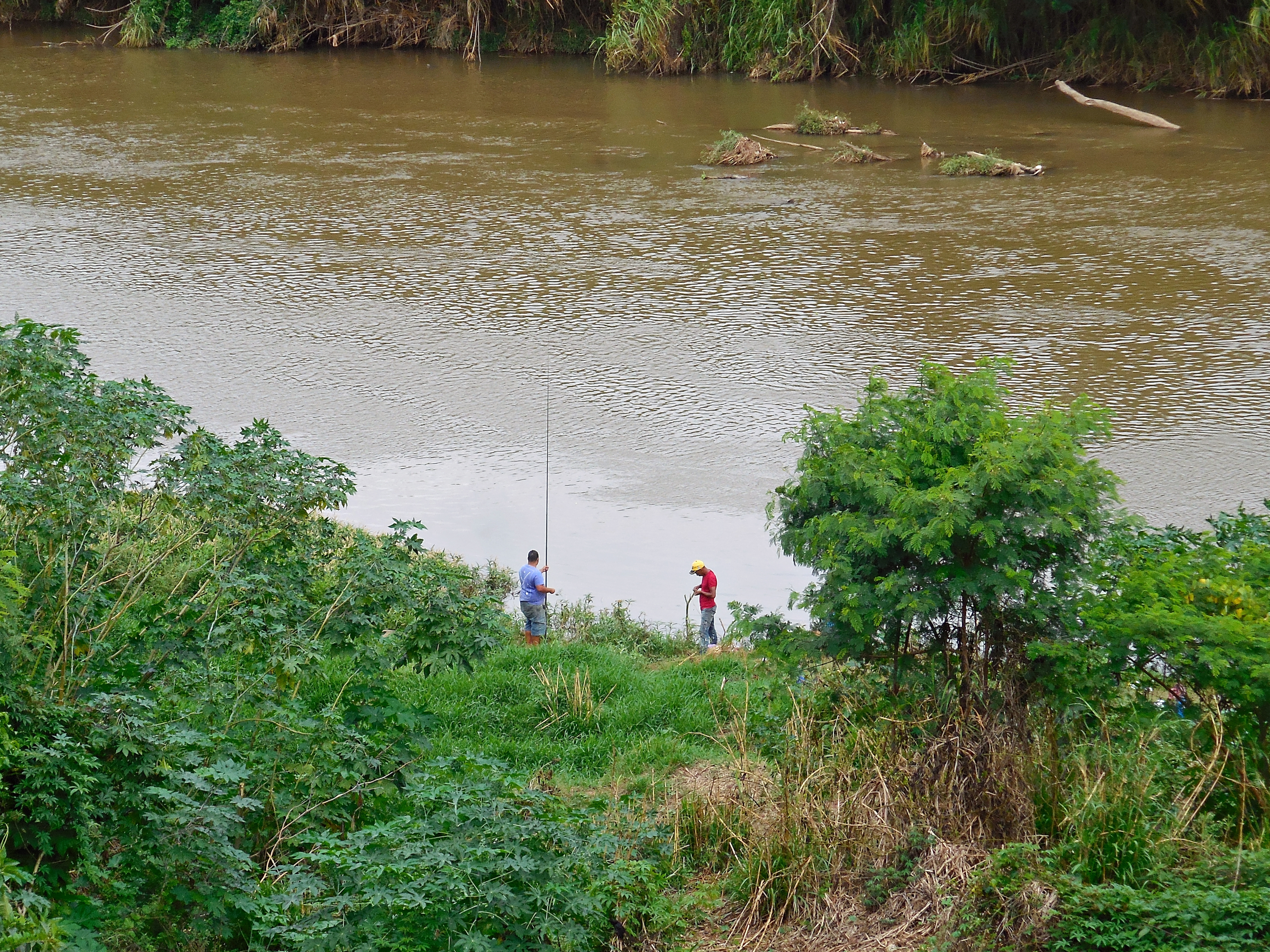
Fishermen on the bank of the Piracicaba River in Coronel Fabriciano

The Piracicaba River basin covers all or part of 21 municipalities, 17 of which have their headquarters in the drainage area. Among these, the riverbed bathes the urban perimeter of the municipalities of Rio Piracicaba, Bela Vista de Minas, Nova Era, Antônio Dias, Timóteo, Coronel Fabriciano and Ipatinga. The basin's population is estimated at 800,000 inhabitants, most of whom live in João Monlevade, Itabira or the Vale do Aço Metropolitan Region, which together account for approximately 80% of the urban population. Out of the total number of residents in the drainage area, 90% live in urban areas. The concentration in urban areas is directly linked to the rural exodus generated by the process of industrialisation and development of the main cities. The most important federal highways that intersect the region are the BR-120, BR-262 and BR-381, while the main state highways are the MG-123, MG-232, MG-326 and MG-434.

Around 51% of the total water extracted directly from the Piracicaba River is destined for industrial use, 44% for human supply, 3% for irrigation and 2% for animal supply. According to information from 2010, the total exploited to meet demand is equivalent to 5.02 cubic metres per second (m^{3}/s), which is below the limit stipulated by the United Nations (UN), which is 29.9 m^{3}/s. Groundwater is used as an alternative to surface water abstraction in most of the municipalities in the basin, and is even the main source of public supply in the Vale do Aço Metropolitan Region. However, the demand for human and industrial consumption has been growing significantly. In addition, there is a considerable withdrawal of water from smaller tributaries for human supply, where demand tends to exceed water availability, especially in the region of the sources of the Piracicaba, Conceição and Santa Bárbara rivers and in some stretches of the Prata river.

Fishing still takes place in the river, but pollution and the decrease in the average level have extinguished most of the fish species over time. The activity is mainly carried out by the local population and in an amateur way, but according to the ‘state fishing law’, approved in 2002, fishermen must have a ‘fisherman's licence’, issued by the State Forestry Institute (IEF), whether they are fishing from the banks or from boats. Any boat used must also be registered. During the piracema period, which normally runs from 1 November to 28 February, stricter restrictions are applied to encourage the fish to travel to the headwaters to reproduce. From the downstream end of the Limoeiro stream to the mouth, fishing is prohibited at any time of the year. In addition to fishing, the waters of the spring are used for recreation by people living along the banks, but the excess of pollutants is a health risk and drownings occasionally occur. Another form of use is for informal transport in canoes between nearby towns, to shorten land routes.

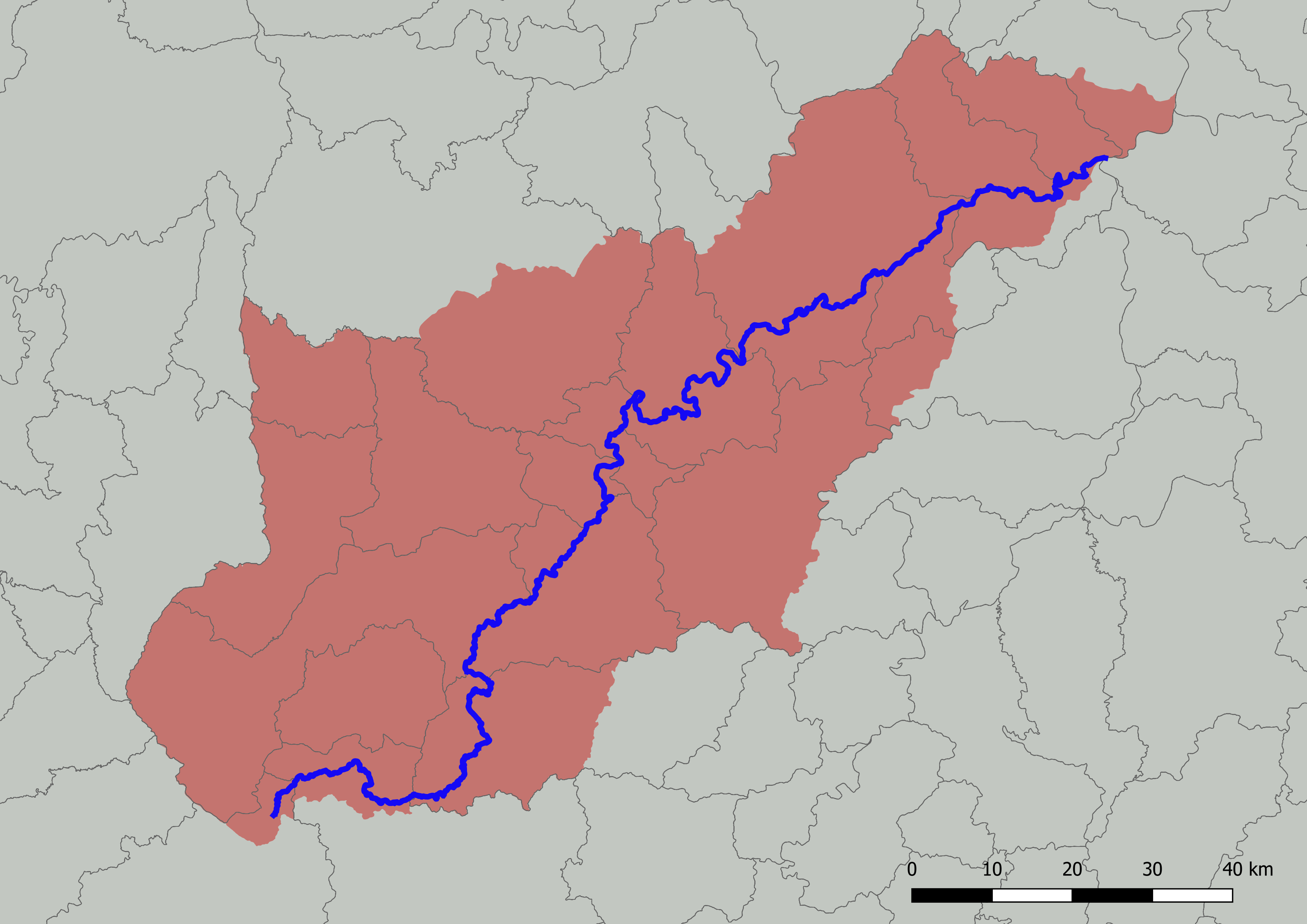
Municipalities in the Piracicaba river basin (numbered in alphabetical order):

1	Alvinópolis
2	Antônio Dias
3	Barão de Cocais
4	Bela Vista de Minas
5	Bom Jesus do Amparo
6	Catas Altas
7	Coronel Fabriciano

8	Ipatinga
9	Itabira
10	Jaguaraçu
11	João Monlevade
12	Mariana
13	Marliéria
14	Nova Era

15	Ouro Preto
16	Rio Piracicaba
17	Santa Bárbara
18	Santana do Paraíso
19	São Domingos do Prata
20	São Gonçalo do Rio Abaixo
21	Timóteo

Piracicaba riverbed	Municipal borders

=== Economy ===
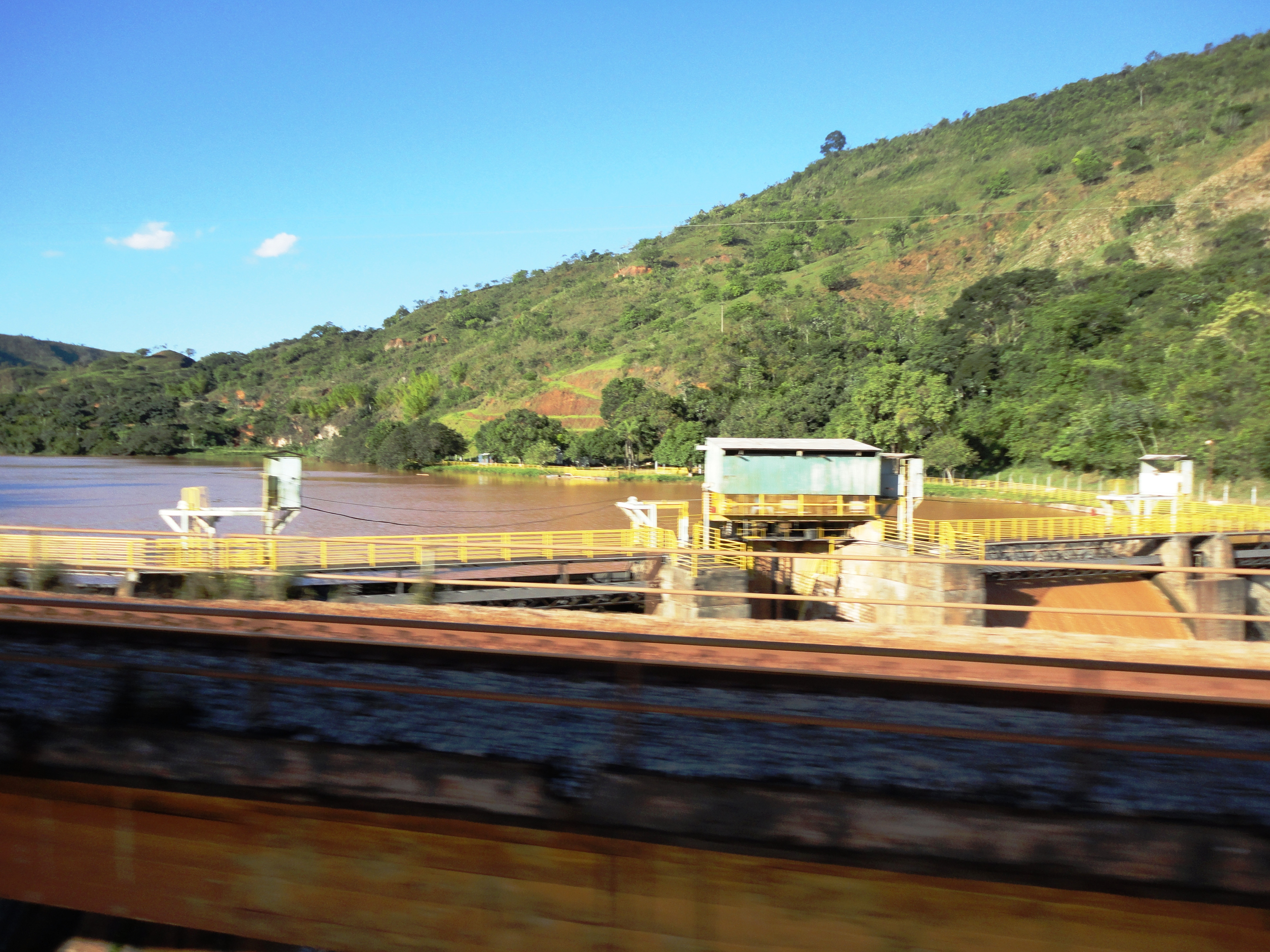
Piracicaba River at the Guilman Amorim Hydroelectric Power Plant, in Antônio Dias.

Around 53% of the Gross domestic product (GDP) of the municipalities in the river's catchment area comes from the industrial sector, while 35% is added by trade and/or services and 1% by agriculture. The remaining 11% comes from other activities. In terms of agriculture, the main crops are rice, sugar cane, maize and, to a lesser extent, coffee, while the main livestock are cattle and buffalo. The Piracicaba River cuts through a region with a strong industrial presence, which was mainly responsible for the urban densification of the basin's most populous cities.

Mining has been active since the end of the 17th century, with the start of gold mining and the settlement of the Mariana and Ouro Preto regions. The basin is home to some of the main mining areas in the country, such as the Brucutu mines in São Gonçalo do Rio Abaixo, Gongo Soco in Barão de Cocais and Água Limpa in Rio Piracicaba, and Vale's and Samarco's iron ore extraction camps in Itabira and Mariana. Vast expanses of open-cast mines can be found in these mining centres. There are mining concessions for bauxite, kaolin, iron, gems, manganese, construction material, gold, ornamental rocks, among other minerals. Some rivers also have sand extraction for civil construction, with examples of concessions in João Monlevade (Santa Bárbara River) and Timóteo (Piracicaba River).

The Piracicaba River has significant hydroelectric potential that is harnessed by the region's industries through hydroelectric plants (HPPs) and small hydroelectric plants (SHPs). The most important complexes on the riverbed are the Rio Piracicaba SHP (in João Monlevade), Sá Carvalho HPP, Guilman Amorim HPP and Amorim SHP (the latter in Antônio Dias). Hydroelectric plants can also be found in other parts of the basin, such as the Peti and São Gonçalo SHPs, on the Santa Bárbara river (in São Gonçalo do Rio Abaixo), and the Cocais Grande SHP, on the Cocais Grande stream (Antônio Dias). The Peti HPP lake on the Santa Bárbara River is the largest in the basin, covering an area of 678 hectares and holding 42.5 million m^{3} of volume. The Guilman Amorim HPP, which supplies electricity to the ArcelorMittal Aços Longos plants in João Monlevade and Samarco in Mariana, is the largest in terms of power generated. Although the reservoirs are relatively small and have a limited influence on flow, in flood events the dams can prevent flooding until all the gates have to be opened.

== Ecology and the environment ==
=== Degradation ===
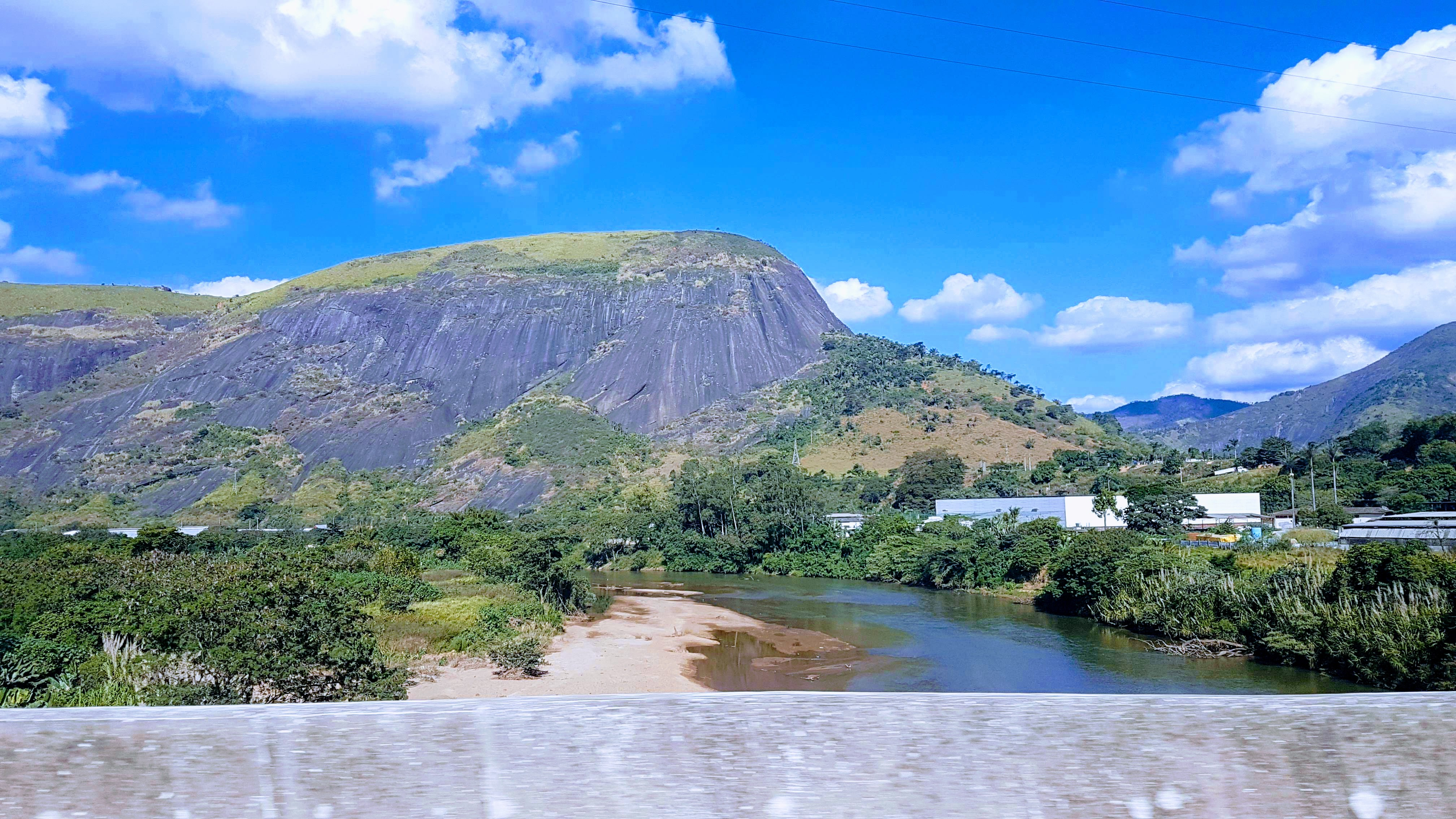
Siltation of the river banks between Antônio Dias and Timóteo, seen from the BR-381 bridge.

At the same time as the area covered by native forest is dissolving in isolated spots that have not been devastated, the river and its tributaries have been severely punished by pollution generated from waste caused by local industries, unbridled deforestation, mining and the proliferation of eucalyptus monoculture. Mining activity, concentrated in the region where the river originates, causes a strong silting process along its entire course. It is worth noting that Vale and Samarco facilities are located 12 kilometres from where the water flows in the Caraça mountain range. In addition, sewage from several towns is dumped on the riverbanks without any kind of treatment.

Following the dam collapse in Brumadinho on 25 January 2019, analyses were carried out on several dams in Minas Gerais, finding risks of accidents in some of them including in the Piracicaba river basin. The greatest impacts on the riverbed would occur if the Upper South Dam at the Gongo Soco mine in Barão de Cocais, belonging to Vale, were to break, which was identified as being at risk of collapse due to the instability of the northern slope of its pit. The collapse could generate a wave of mud that would reach the Piracicaba River via the Santa Bárbara River and then the Doce River, which was already affected by the dam collapse in Mariana in 2015. The mud would destroy 383 hectares of native Atlantic Forest, cause soil infertility in the affected areas and jeopardise the operation of hydroelectric power plants. As a result, the dam was closed, preventive evacuations were carried out in the surrounding areas and decommissioning began. By June 2019, this and 32 other dams had been closed in the state, including in Ouro Preto, Mariana, Rio Piracicaba and Itabira.

Large-scale eucalyptus plantations, in turn, have led to a profound change in the natural landscape, as vast areas are occupied by the same species of plantation. This has reduced the region's forest ecosystem and increased the risk of pests. In addition, the use of fertilisers and pesticides is necessary to guarantee productivity. After planting and felling, there is a risk of erosion due to the rugged terrain and of pesticides flowing into watercourses, which also favours siltation. In terms of socio-economic aspects, eucalyptus began to occupy areas previously used by local agriculture, weakening the production and marketing of local products. Rural communities also began to depend almost exclusively on these crops, altering the local social and cultural context. Deforestation, on the other hand, intensifies soil runoff, altering drainage characteristics and reducing the capacity of the soil and aquifers to retain water.

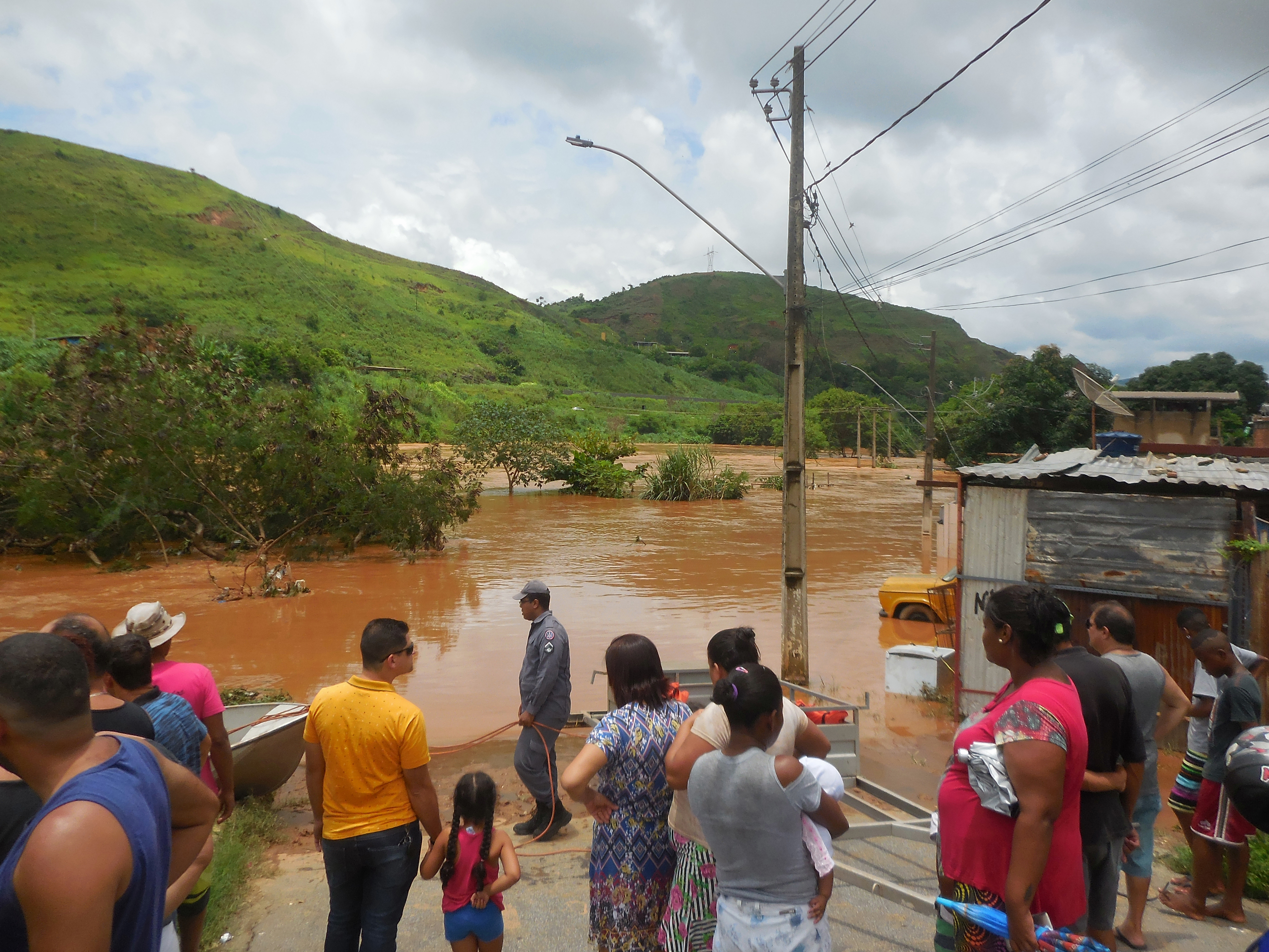
Piracicaba River floods in Coronel Fabriciano after heavy rains in the basin in January 2020

An analysis carried out at the request of Estado de Minas, published in April 2014, showed that the river's waters had 161% more faecal coliforms than what is acceptable under the National Environment Council (CONAMA), after leaving the Iron Quadrangle region and before entering any urban centres. Another analysis in the same area, carried out by the Minas Gerais Institute of Water Management (IGAM) in 2013, indicated a concentration of sulphide 1,400% above what is allowed, 112% more manganese and 104% more solids. In Rio Piracicaba, downstream from João Monlevade, the presence of thermotolerant coliforms was 9,208% above what is acceptable under CONAMA. As a result, the condition of the Piracicaba River threatens both fish and human life if its waters are consumed directly. In the Steel Valley Metropolitan Region, the degradation is aggravated by the fact that untreated sewage is discharged from Coronel Fabriciano and Timóteo, before it reaches its mouth between Timóteo and Ipatinga.

The environmental impact on the Piracicaba River extends to the Doce River, of which it is one of the most degraded tributaries. In addition, the pollution of the source was aggravated by the long period of irregular rainfall that the region faced throughout the 2010s, leading to a considerable decrease in its average level and the extinction of several springs in the basin. The low flow, combined with siltation, contributed to the proliferation of sandbanks. During this drought, the river showed the lowest flow since measurements began in the 1930s. The Piracicaba River Basin Committee predicted in 2015 that if these conditions prevail, the river could dry up by 2030. On the other hand, occasional heavy rainfall quickly raises the riverbed level and threaten populated areas settled in risk zones.

=== Treatment and conservation ===
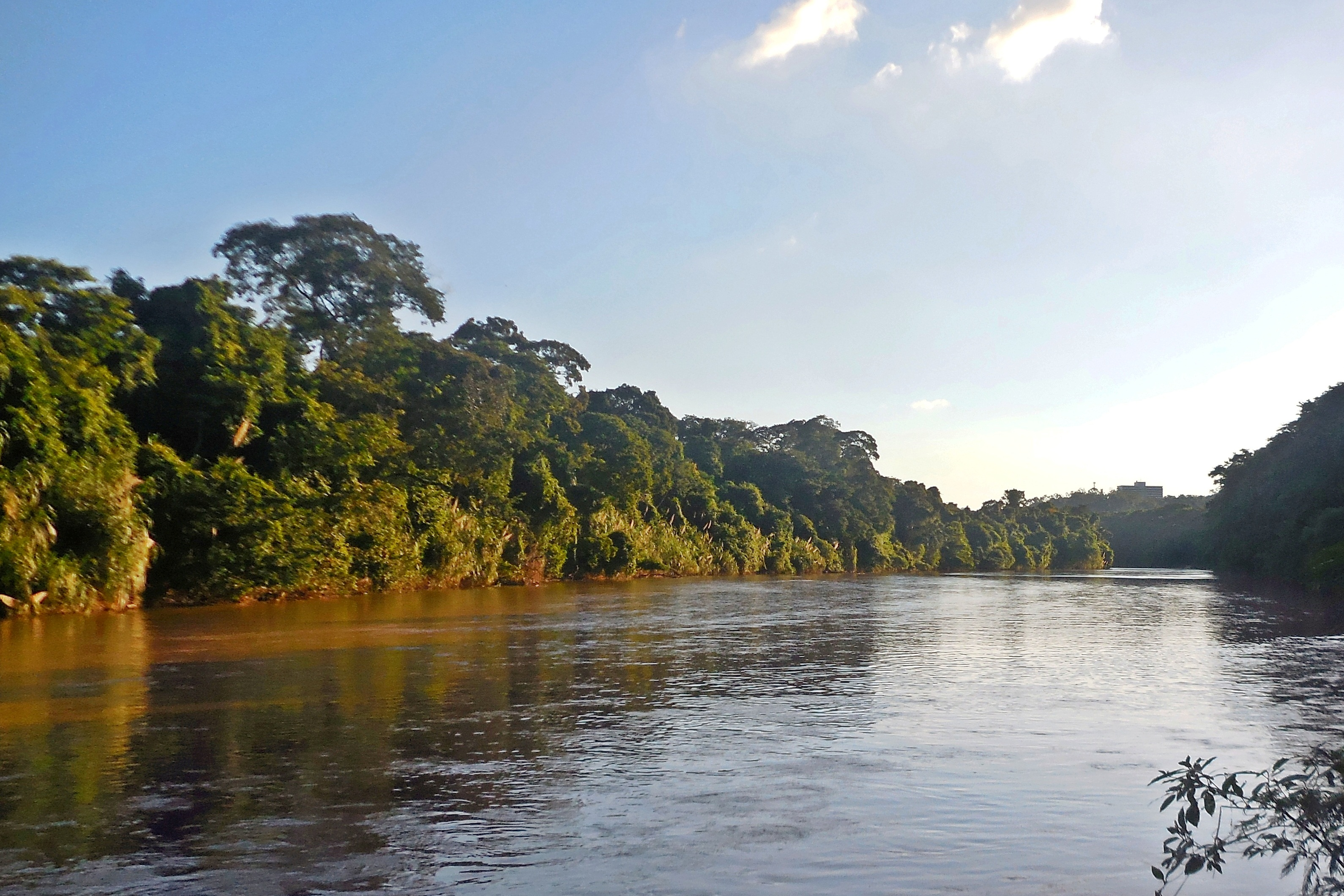
Piracicaba River between Timóteo and Ipatinga, near its mouth, in the opposite direction.

According to Vale, the company keeps the spring area preserved and treats all the water before it is discharged into the spring, in the same way that Samarco claims to do. However, Samarco paralysed its activities at the site as a result of the dam collapse in Mariana in 2015. ArcelorMittal Aços Longos, in João Monlevade, also claims to treat or reuse all the water from its plant. The water used by Aperam South America and Usiminas, located in Timóteo and Ipatinga respectively, is extracted and treated from the river by the companies themselves, while the effluent is reused or released into the same stream after undergoing treatment plants. Cenibra, one of the main eucalyptus producers in the region for pulp production at its factory, claims to regularly carry out technical, economic, environmental and social planning to diagnose and propose measures to mitigate the environmental impacts generated. The company also claims to provide previously non-existent infrastructure and housing in the areas where it operates, as well as carrying out support programmes and discussions with the communities.

According to 2010 data, 84.6% of the sewage produced by the municipalities in the basin is collected, but only 19.4% is treated. Catas Altas, Ipatinga and Itabira were the only cities to treat 100% of their sewage. In addition, 79.9 per cent of solid waste was properly disposed. In April 2019, the Cruzeiro Celeste sewage treatment plant (ETE) in João Monlevade began operating, with the intention of treating 20 per cent of the urban effluent generated in the city, but a second ETE (Carneirinhos) was under construction, which was expected to treat 80 per cent of the municipality's wastewater. In the same year, the operation of a sewage treatment plant in the Limoeiro neighbourhood in Timóteo was authorised, with the initial intention of serving 165,000 inhabitants of the city and neighbouring Coronel Fabriciano. The basin also has several water quality monitoring stations run by IGAM, with regular analyses of physical-chemical and biological parameters.

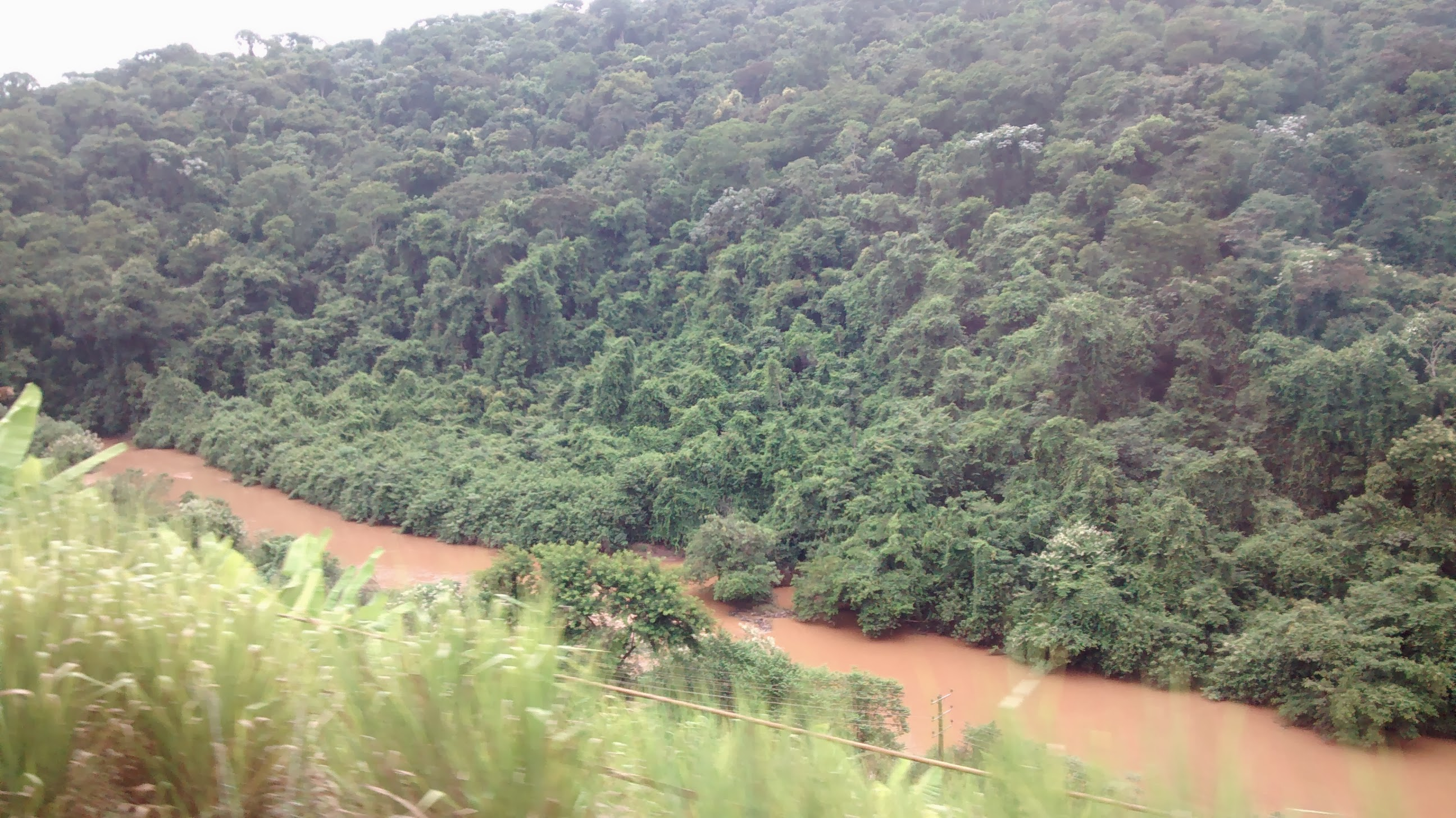
Riparian forest in João Monlevade

There are a few stretches of riparian forest and preservation areas along the banks of the spring. The river's spring is located in the Caraça mountain range, which is considered a private natural heritage reserve (RPPN). Other protected areas in the basin are the Peti Environmental Station and the Serra do Gandarela National Park. There are also environmental protection areas (APAs) along the course of the river that are only mapped out, with no management measures in place. At its mouth, the riverbed meets the Doce River in one of the borders of the Doce River State Park. In the 1990s, Usiminas restored 22 km of the Piracicaba and Doce riverbanks, adding riparian forest between the Mangueiras neighbourhood, in Coronel Fabriciano, and Santana do Paraíso, in an area that borders the urban area.

The Piracicaba River Basin Committee (CBH), created under the state's water resources policy from the dismemberment of the Doce River Committee, is the normative and deliberative body responsible for managing the basin's water resources by mediating among society. It is subordinate to the state government and is made up of members of the state government, municipal governments, companies and civil society. Its actions include awareness campaigns, seminars, monitoring environmental problems and carrying out studies. Sometimes these activities are also carried out by public bodies, companies, NGOs and social and environmental leaders in favour of river conservation. In 2019, for example, the so-called ‘Piracicaba Expedition – For the Life of the River’, promoted by researchers, CBH and supporters, travelled the entire riverbed to analyse water quality, land use and occupation, sediments and polluting sources, as well as carrying out socio-environmental and cultural awareness campaigns in the cities they visited. It is also worth highlighting research activities regarding the river's conditions carried out by educational institutions and universities in the region.

== Popular culture ==
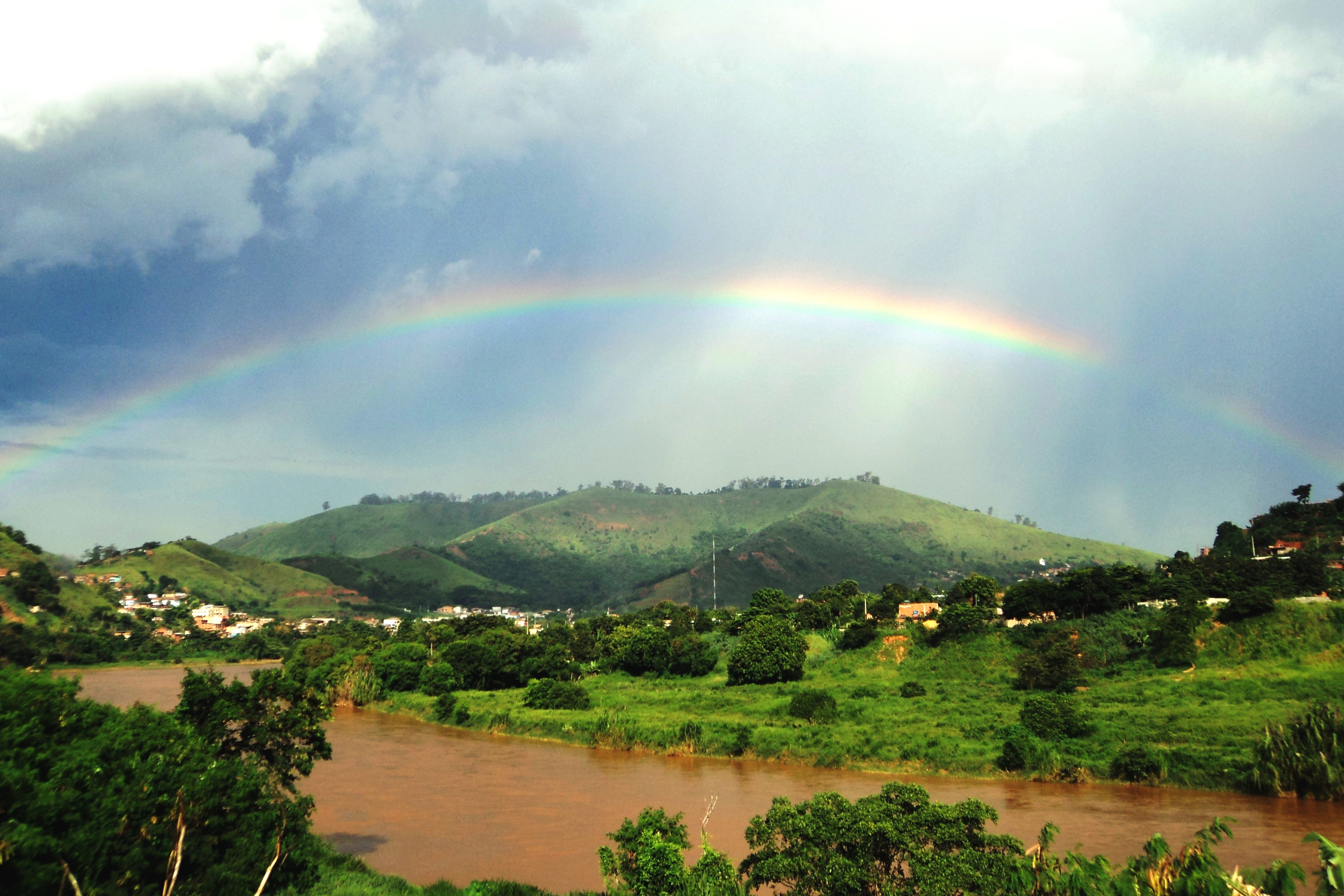
Rainbow over the Piracicaba river, as seen from Coronel Fabriciano

Although degraded, the Piracicaba River is still a part of the daily life of residents around its course, whether through its direct use or solely through its physical existence. The river is directly linked to the history of the towns that developed on its banks, and is even referenced in the municipality's name of Rio Piracicaba. This, in turn, was inherited from its former name, São Miguel do Rio Piracicaba, dating back to the 18th century. Along with the historical context, the spring is added to various landscapes that contain individual and collective meanings for nearby residents, instigating memories and recollections. It also marks the denomination of the region known as ‘Médio Piracicaba’, or even ‘Médio Piracicaba micro-region’, which includes a total of 17 towns that have common historical origins, socio-cultural context and geographical aspects, as well as diverse cultural assets and manifestations.

One of the municipalities in the Middle Piracicaba is São Gonçalo do Rio Abaixo, where the Lavadeiras da Prainha group, considered to be the municipality's intangible heritage, brings together dozens of ladies who depended on the region's waters for diverse daily activities, such as washing clothes and pots, while singing songs. The river most used in this town was the Santa Bárbara, one of the main tributaries of the Piracicaba river, but the washerwomen could be found on stretches of the Piracicaba as well. Fishing, although in decline due to pollution and the reduced availability of fish, is another activity that has symbolism for the nearby inhabitants. In addition, the presence of the river, combined with the undulating terrain, creates attractive physical landscapes. All of this scenery is sometimes exalted in local cultural manifestations, such as paintings, music, theatre, or media publications.

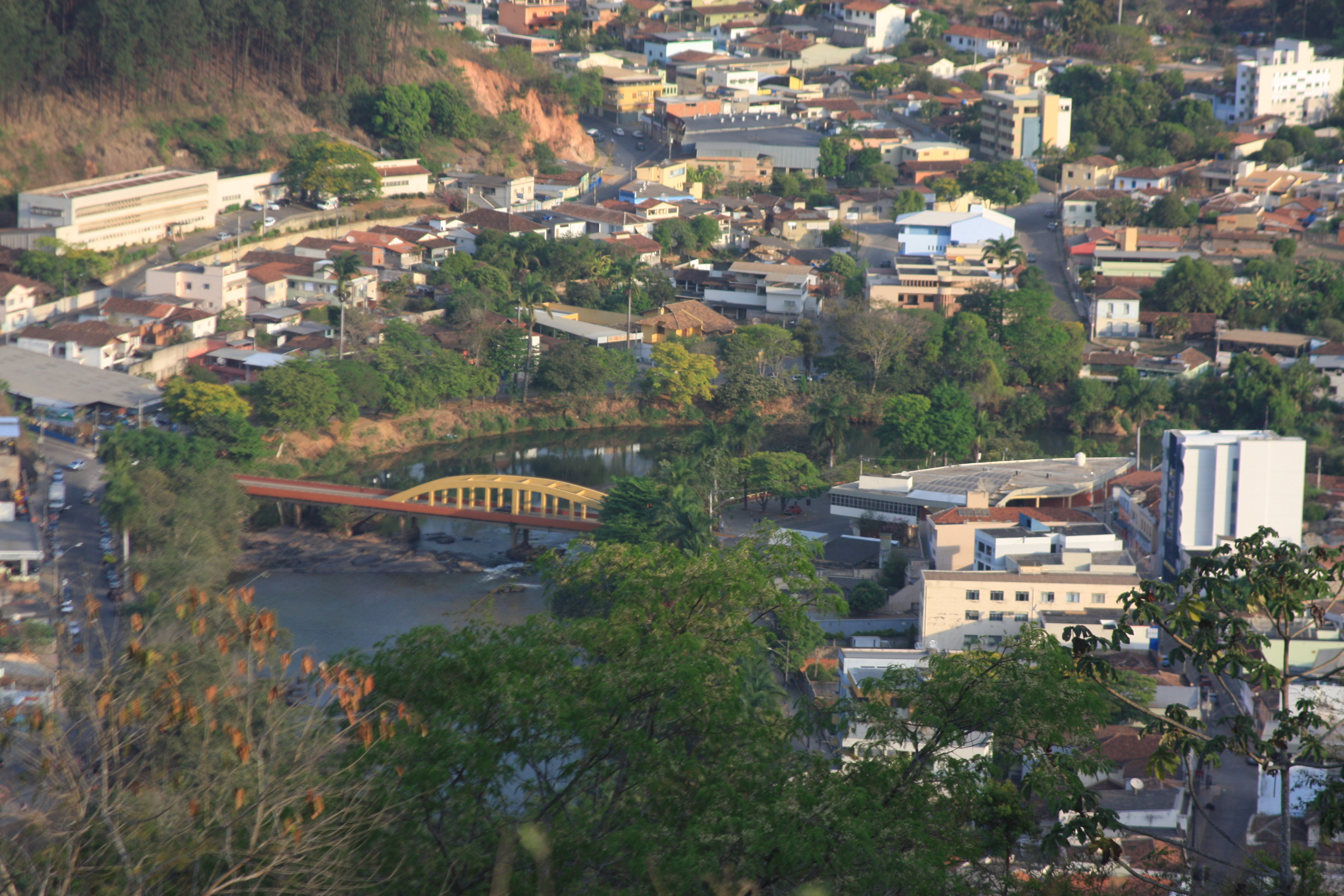
View of Nova Era with the Benedito Valadares Bridge, dating from 1934, towering over the Piracicaba River.

The Piracicaba River is dammed, invaded, exploited, drained, polluted, silted up, mined, excavated, diverted, altered, fenced off, attacked, dumped, poisoned, stepped on, fished, drunk, researched, used and nobody says thank you!!!

— Mário Carvalho Neto, historian from Coronel Fabriciano, for the Caminhos Gerais magazine (2002)

In Nova Era, the Benedito Valadares Bridge, over the Piracicaba River on the stretch that crosses the city, was inaugurated by the then president Getúlio Vargas and governor of Minas Gerais Benedito Valadares on 13 May 1934, and has been listed as a municipal cultural heritage site since 2016. During a flood in 2011, a wooden canoe measuring 12.8 metres (42 ft) long, 80 centimetres (31 in) high and 90 centimetres (35 in) wide was found on the riverbank in Coronel Fabriciano by nearby residents. The artefact was acquired by the local administration, which added it to the José Avelino Barbosa Museum collection as a reference to the canoeists who had settled in the city since before its urban core was established In 2019, restoration work began on the ruins of Pedra Mole Station in Ipatinga. This was the first EFVM railway station in the Steel Valley, dating back to 1922, but it was deactivated less than five years later due to the instability of the soil at the site, which led to the displacement of this section of the railway. Located close to the mouth of the Piracicaba River, it has remained in a state of abandonment in the middle of closed forest ever since, but the restoration of the station in 2019 included the construction of a deck to view the meeting of the Piracicaba and Doce rivers.

== See also ==
- List of rivers of Minas Gerais
- Caladão Stream
- Caladinho Stream
