= Tingiopsidium tropicum =

Scientific classification
- Kingdom: Fungi
- Division: Ascomycota
- Class: Lecanoromycetes
- Order: Peltigerales
- Family: Koerberiaceae
- Genus: Tingiopsidium
- Species: T. tropicum

Binomial name
- Tingiopsidium tropicum Aptroot (2022)

Species of lichen

Tingiopsidium tropicum is a species of lichen in the family Koerberiaceae. Described by André Aptroot in 2022, this saxicolous (rock-dwelling) lichen is notable for its microfoliose (small, leaf-like), densely branched thallus that is appressed to the substrate. It was discovered growing on granite in river beds in Catas Altas, Brazil.

== Taxonomy and etymology ==
The species was described as part of a study documenting a diverse array of lichen species in Brazil. The specific epithet tropicum reflects the tropical region where this lichen was found. While the absence of apothecia (fruiting bodies) and DNA sequence data leaves some uncertainty about its exact classification, the morphology of Tingiopsidium tropicum suggests its placement within the genus Tingiopsidium.

== Description ==
The thallus of Tingiopsidium tropicum is dark grey, covers areas up to 5 cm in diameter, and features gnarled isidia concentrated in the central parts. The lobes are convex, ranging from 0.4 to 1.2 mm in length and 0.15 to 0.35 mm in width, with the marginal lobes being longer than those in the centre. The upper surface of the thallus is cellular and corticate, while the lower surface is black and lacks rhizines. The medulla is greenish, and the photobiont is a member of the green algal genus Trebouxia. All chemical spot tests on the thallus were negative, indicating the absence of detectable secondary metabolites.

== Habitat and distribution ==
This species is exclusively known from its type locality in Catas Altas (Minas Gerais, Brazil), where it occupies granite substrates in river beds that are periodically submerged. It shares its habitat with Trapeliopsis studerae, another lichen species with a highly specific ecological niche. As Aptroot notes, a specimen he previously collected in Hong Kong, China, and initially identified as another species, may actually represent this species, indicating a broader geographical distribution than initially thought.
