= Koerberia sonomensis =

Scientific classification
- Kingdom: Fungi
- Division: Ascomycota
- Class: Lecanoromycetes
- Order: Peltigerales
- Family: Koerberiaceae
- Genus: Koerberia
- Species: K. sonomensis

Binomial name
- Koerberia sonomensis (Tuck.) Henssen [1963]

Synonyms
- Vestergrenopsis sonomensis (Tuck.) T. Sprib. & Muggia

Species of lichen

Koerberia sonomensis, the Sonoma koerberia lichen, is a dark olive-green foliose lichen found in western North America mountains, Mediterranean areas of Europe, northern Africa and in the Sonoran Desert. The body (thallus) is a small .5 to 1 centimetre (0.20 to 0.39 in) rosette of leafy structures with elongate lobes to 2 millimetres (0.079 in). The upper surface is dark olive-green sometimes striped, and the lower surface is pale olive-green. The fruiting forms (apothecia) are flat to slightly convex, and deep red-brown. It is in the Koerberia genus in the Placynthiaceae family.
