= Zé Ricardo (disambiguation) =

Zé Ricardo (born 1971), born José Ricardo Mannarino , is a Brazilian football manager and former footballer

Zé Ricardo may also refer to:

- Zé Ricardo (footballer, born 1996), born José Ricardo Barbosa Ribeiro Drumond, Brazilian football midfielder
- Zé Ricardo (footballer, born 1999), born José Ricardo Araújo Fernandes, Brazilian football midfielder
