= Evaldo (footballer, born 1982) =

Brazilian footballer

Personal information
- Full name: Evaldo dos Santos Fabiano
- Date of birth: 18 March 1982 (age 44)
- Place of birth: Rio Piracicaba, Brazil
- Height: 1.83 m (6 ft 0 in)
- Position: Left-back

Youth career
- Athletico Paranaense

Senior career*
Years	Team	Apps	(Gls)
2001–2002	Athletico Paranaense		
2003	Democrata-SL		
2003–2004	Porto B	23	(0)
2004	Porto	1	(0)
2004–2008	Marítimo	101	(1)
2004–2005	Marítimo B	15	(0)
2008–2010	Braga	59	(2)
2010–2014	Sporting CP	42	(0)
2012–2013	→ Deportivo La Coruña (loan)	15	(0)
2014−2015	Gil Vicente	29	(2)
2015−2016	Moreirense	34	(1)
2016−2019	Cova Piedade	113	(5)
2019−2020	Torreense	25	(4)
2020−2021	Atlético Malveira	17	(2)
Total		474	(17)
- * Club domestic league appearances and goals

Evaldo dos Santos Fabiano (born 18 March 1982), known simply as Evaldo, is a Brazilian former professional footballer who played as a left-back.

== Career ==
Evaldo was born in Rio Piracicaba, Minas Gerais. Having started out professionally with Club Athletico Paranaense and Democrata Futebol Clube, he moved to Europe in 2003, as he was purchased by FC Porto in Portugal; he spent most of his only season with their reserves.

In summer 2004, Evaldo was involved in a transfer that brought compatriot Pepe from C.S. Marítimo as he, Antonieliton Ferreira and Tonel all went to Madeira. After a shaky start, he became an undisputed starter.

Evaldo joined S.C. Braga in the 2008 off-season, after four years in Madeira. With no competition in his position, he only missed one Primeira Liga match in his first year, as the Minho side qualified once again for the UEFA Cup.

After helping Braga to its best-ever league finish in the 2009–10 campaign (second), Evaldo joined Sporting CP in June 2010, signing a four-year contract worth €3 million. He made his official debut on 14 August, in a 1–0 away loss against F.C. Paços de Ferreira. On the 26th, he scored a rare goal – and through a header – as the Lions defeated Brøndby IF 3–0 after losing 0–2 at home, thus qualifying for the Europa League's group stage.

On 14 July 2012, Evaldo moved to La Liga club Deportivo de La Coruña in a season-long loan. His first competitive appearance for the Galicians took place on 20 August, as he played the full 90 minutes in a 2–0 home win over CA Osasuna, and played 16 overall games during his spell as the campaign went on to end in relegation, being ironically voted by the fans as Player of the Year.

In July 2014, after one year with Sporting where he was limited to training, Evaldo agreed terms with Gil Vicente FC. The following year, after suffering top-flight relegation, he joined fellow league team Moreirense F.C. on a one-year deal.

Evaldo took his game to the LigaPro on 6 July 2016, with the 34-year-old signing with newcomers C.D. Cova da Piedade. He rarely missed a match during his spell, always spent in that tier.

Evaldo dropped down to the Portuguese third division in July 2019, agreeing to a deal at S.C.U. Torreense. Subsequently, he worked as a player-coach with amateurs AC Malveira.
