= Henssenia =

Scientific classification
- Domain: Eukaryota
- Kingdom: Fungi
- Division: Ascomycota
- Class: Lecanoromycetes
- Order: Peltigerales
- Family: Koerberiaceae
- Genus: Henssenia; Ertz, R.S.Poulsen & Søchting (2017)

Type species
- Henssenia glaucella (Tuck.) Ertz, R.S.Poulsen & Søchting (2017)

Species
- H. glaucella H. radiata H. subglaucella H. werthii

Genus of lichens

Henssenia is a genus of lichen-forming fungi in the family Koerberiaceae. It has four species. The genus was circumscribed in 2017 by Damien Ertz, Roar Skovlund Poulsen, and Ulrik Søchting, with Henssenia glaucella assigned as the type species. The main distinguishing characteristic of the genus is simple ascospores (i.e., lacking septa) that sometimes have a plasma bridge. The genus name honours German lichenologist Aino Henssen.

== Species ==
- Henssenia glaucella (Tuck.) Ertz, R.S.Poulsen & Søchting (2017)
- Henssenia radiata (P.James & Henssen) Ertz (2017)
- Henssenia subglaucella Ertz & R.S.Poulsen (2017)
- Henssenia werthii (Zahlbr.) Ertz, R.S.Poulsen & Søchting (2017)
