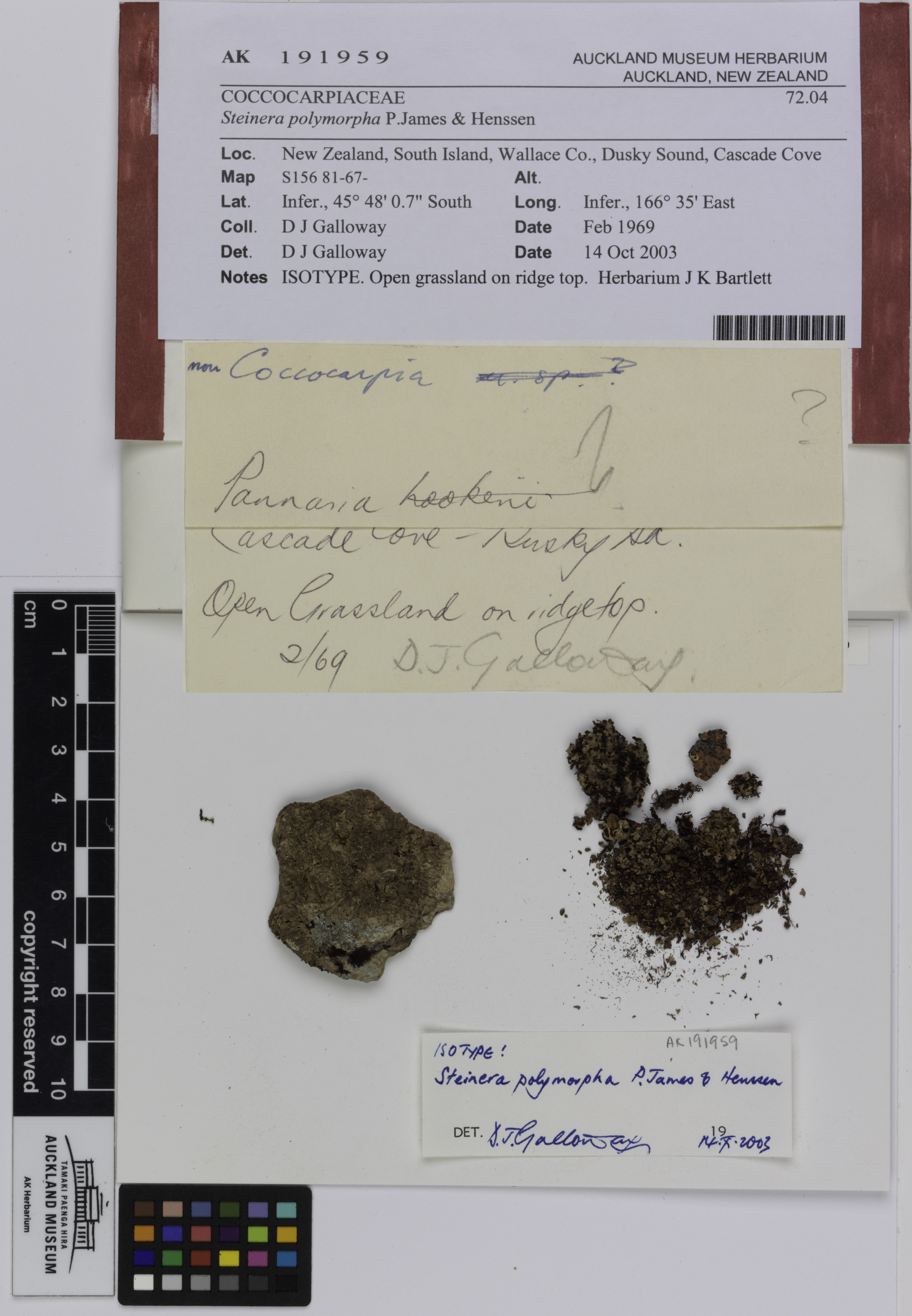
- Herbarium specimen of Steinera polymorpha, kept at the Auckland War Memorial Museum

Scientific classification
- Kingdom: Fungi
- Division: Ascomycota
- Class: Lecanoromycetes
- Order: Peltigerales
- Family: Koerberiaceae
- Genus: Steinera; Zahlbr. (1906)

Type species
- Steinera molybdoplaca (Nyl.) Zahlbr. (1906)

Species
- See text

Synonyms
- Molybdoplaca Nieuwl. (1916)

= Steinera =

Genus of lichens

Steinera is a genus of lichen-forming fungi in the family Koerberiaceae. It was circumscribed in 1906 by Austrian-Hungarian botanist Alexander Zahlbruckner, who dedicated the genus name to his friend Julius Steiner, an Austrian teacher and lichenologist. The genus was revised by Aino Henssen and Peter Wilfred James in 1982. In 2017, Damien Ernst and Roar Skovlund Poulsen described some new species, and recombined others into the genus based on a study of the genus in the subantarctic islands of Crozet and Kerguelen.

== Species ==
- Steinera intricata (Øvstedal) Ertz (2017)
- Steinera isidiata Ertz & R.S.Poulsen (2017)
- Steinera latispora (Øvstedal) Ertz (2017)
- Steinera lebouvieri Ertz (2017)
- Steinera membranacea Ertz & R.S.Poulsen (2017)
- Steinera molybdoplaca (Nyl.) Zahlbr. (1906)
- Steinera olechiana (Alstrup & Søchting) Ertz & Søchting (2017)
- Steinera pannarioides Ertz & R.S.Poulsen (2017)
- Steinera polymorpha P.James & Henssen (1982)
- Steinera sorediata P.James & Henssen (1982)
- Steinera subantarctica (Øvstedal) Ertz (2017)
- Steinera symptychia (Tuck.) T.Sprib. & Muggia (2012)
