= Gustav Wilhelm Körber =

German lichenologist

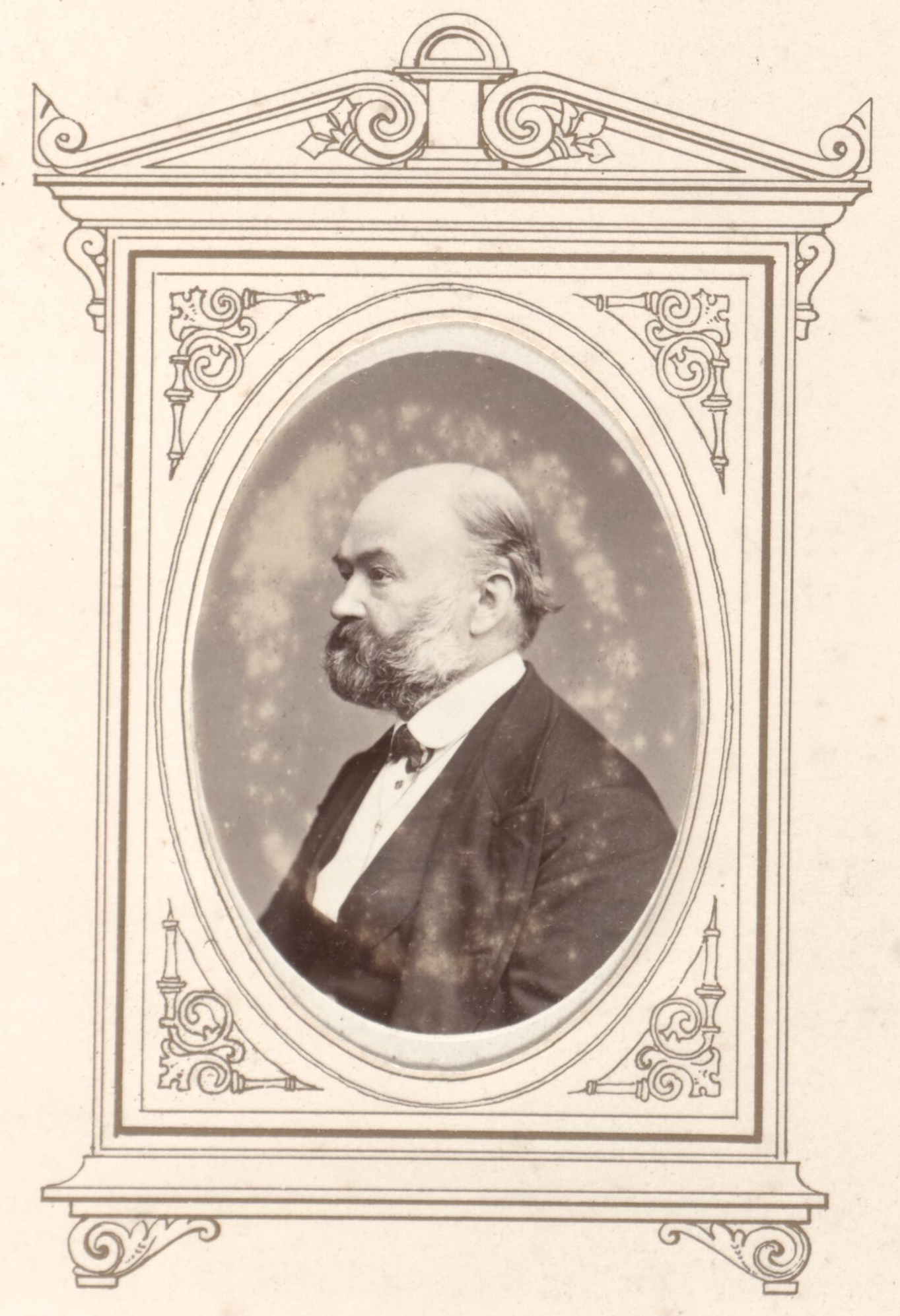
c. 1876

Gustav Wilhelm Körber (10 January 1817, Hirschberg – 27 January 1885, Breslau) was a Silesian-German lichenologist and a professor at the University of Breslau. He specialized in the flora of Central Europe.

== Biography ==
Körber was born in Hirschberg, Silesia where his father was a high school director. He received his early education from the local high school. From 1835 studied natural sciences in Breslau and Berlin in 1838, obtaining his PhD in 1839 with the thesis De gonidiis lichenum. His teachers at Breslau included Heinrich Robert Göppert (1800-1884) and Christian Gottfried Daniel Nees von Esenbeck (1776-1858). At Berlin his influences included Franz Julius Ferdinand Meyen (1804-1840) and the chemist Eilhard Mitscherlich (1794-1863). After graduation, he served as an instructor at the "Elisabethanum" in Breslau, and from 1862, worked as a private teacher. In 1873 he became an associate professor at the University of Breslau.

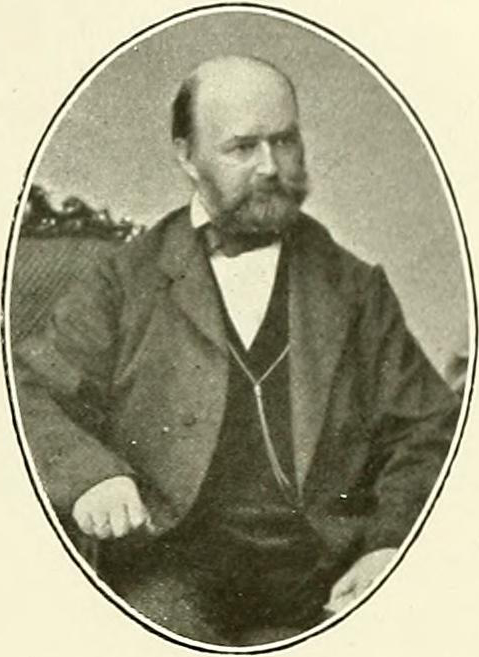
Gustav Wilhelm Körber

Best known for his investigations of lichen species native to Silesia, he also examined specimens found in central and southeastern Europe as well as lichen collected from Mediterranean and Arctic regions. Körber is credited with introducing the term muriform in an 1855 publication to describe the distinctive multi-chambered spores of the lichen genera Rhizocarpon and Umbilicaria, as well as the terms polari-dyblastae and amphithecium in later publications. Körber used fungal characteristics for the description of lichens. This was also adopted by Abramo Massalongo (1824-1860) and was termed the Italian-Silesian school of lichen systematics and continues to be used. He however did not accept the idea that lichens were a symbiotic form and wrote a polemic against the Schwendener-Bornet's lichen theory. He published the exsiccata Lichenes selecti Germanici, distributing lichen specimens collected by famous lichenologists like Ferdinand Christian Gustav Arnold, Johannes Müller Argoviensis, Ignaz Sigismund Poetsch, Berthold Stein, among others. The genera Koerberia (within the Placynthiaceae family) and Koerberiella (in the Lecideaceae family) are named after him.

Körber was a freemason and was involved in local politics and was a noted liberal.

== Selected works ==
- Grundriss der kryptogamen-kunde, 1848 – Outline of cryptogamic species.
- Systema lichenum Germaniae: Die Flechten Deutschlands, 1855 – "Systema lichenum Germaniae": German lichens.
- Parerga lichenologica: Ergänzungen zum Systema lichenum, 1865 – "Parerga lichenologica": Supplement to "Systema lichenum".
- Lichenen aus Istrien, Dalmatien u. Albanien: (with Emanuel Weiss), 1867 – Lichens of Istria, Dalmatia and Albania.
- Lichenen Spitzbergens und Novaja-Semlja's, auf der graf Wilczek'schen expedition, 1872 – Lichens of Spitzbergen and Novaya Zemlya, from the Wilczek expedition.

== See also ==
- Category:Taxa named by Gustav Wilhelm Körber
