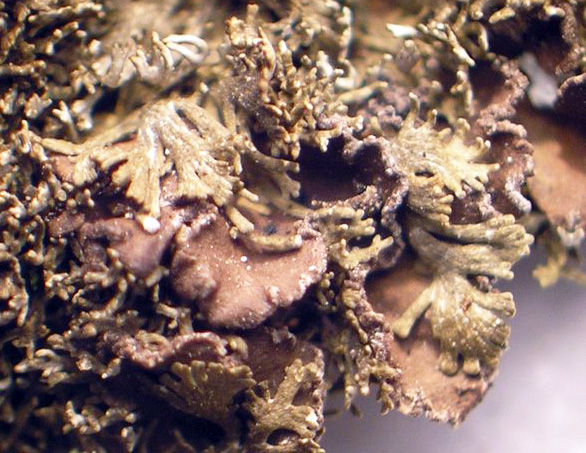
- Tingiopsidium sonomense

Scientific classification
- Kingdom: Fungi
- Division: Ascomycota
- Class: Lecanoromycetes
- Order: Peltigerales
- Family: Koerberiaceae
- Genus: Tingiopsidium; Werner (1939)

Type species
- Tingiopsidium pubescens Werner (1939)

Species
- T. elaeinum T. isidiatum T. pubescens T. sonomense T. tropicum

Synonyms
- Vestergrenopsis Gyeln. (1940)

= Tingiopsidium =

Genus of lichens

Tingiopsidium is a genus of lichen-forming fungi in the family Koerberiaceae. These lichens form star-shaped rosettes that lie flat against surfaces, with some species producing tiny finger-like projections. They partner with cyanobacteria and are distinguished by having 12–16 spores per reproductive sac, unlike most lichens which have eight. The genus, established in 1939 by the French botanist Roger-Guy Werner, currently includes five recognized species.

== Taxonomy ==
The genus was circumscribed in 1939 by the French botanist Roger-Guy Werner, with Tingiopsidium pubescens assigned as the type species. Vestergrenopsis, a genus proposed by Vilmos Kőfaragó-Gyelnik in 1940, was shown to contain a species that is the type of Tingiopsidium, and because Tingiopsidium was published a year earlier, the principle of priority makes Vestergrenopsis illegitimate, and a synonym of Tingiopsidium.

== Description ==
Tingiopsidium forms closely appressed rosettes whose radiating lobes give the thallus a star‑like outline. The surface may be smooth or dotted with tiny, finger‑like isidia, depending on the species. Unlike many foliose lichens, it lacks a sharply defined upper cortex; instead, the outer layer consists of short‑celled fungal hyphae aligned lengthwise along each lobe, while the interior (medulla) becomes looser and more elongate. There is no true lower cortex, so the pale underside shows exposed hyphae rather than a protective skin. The photosynthetic partner is the cyanobacterium Scytonema, which occurs as chains of cells threaded through the fungal tissue.

The lichen's sexual fruiting bodies are sessile apothecia that sit on the surface of the lobes. A rim of thallus tissue surrounds each disc; this rim is entirely made of tightly packed fungal cells and even contains a few Scytonema filaments. The proper exciple is so reduced that it is scarcely visible. Over the hymenium lies a red‑brown epithecium, whereas the hymenium itself is colourless to very pale brown but stains blue in iodine (I+). Slender paraphyses run through this layer; they are mostly unbranched, stick together in a gelatinous mass, and end in slightly swollen, bead‑like cells. The asci are club‑shaped, contain twelve to sixteen ascospores, and lack any blue‑staining apical dome. Their spores are colourless, single‑celled and ellipsoidal to nearly spherical, occasionally connected by thin cytoplasmic strands known as plasma bridges.

Asexual reproduction occurs in tiny, sunken pycnidia scattered within the thallus. These colourless‑walled structures generate rod‑shaped (bacilliform) conidia from short budding cells. Thin-layer chromatography has not revealed any characteristic lichen substances in the genus.

== Species ==
As of July 2025, Species Fungorum (in the Catalogue of Life) accept five species of Tingiopsidium:

- Tingiopsidium elaeinum (Wahlenb.) Hafellner & T.Sprib. (2016)
- Tingiopsidium isidiatum (Degel.) Hafellner & T.Sprib. (2016)
- Tingiopsidium pubescens Werner (1939)
- Tingiopsidium sonomense (Tuck.) Hafellner & T.Sprib. (2016)
- Tingiopsidium tropicum Aptroot (2022)
