= Zé Ricardo (footballer, born 1996) =

Brazilian footballer

Personal information
- Full name: José Ricardo Barbosa Ribeiro Drumond
- Date of birth: 9 March 1996 (age 30)
- Place of birth: Bom Jesus do Amparo, Brazil
- Height: 1.76 m (5 ft 9 in)
- Position: Defensive midfielder

Team information
- Current team: Avaí
- Number: 77

Youth career
- 2014–2016: América Mineiro

Senior career*
Years	Team	Apps	(Gls)
2016–2023	América Mineiro	185	(2)
2023	Ceará	17	(0)
2024	Portuguesa	10	(0)
2024–	Avaí	106	(1)
- * Club domestic league appearances and goals as of 18 November 2026

José Ricardo Barbosa Ribeiro Drumond (born 9 March 1996), commonly known as Zé Ricardo, is a Brazilian footballer who plays as a defensive midfielder for Avaí.

== Career ==
=== América Mineiro ===
Zé Ricardo was born in Bom Jesus do Amparo, Minas Gerais, and joined América Mineiro's youth setup in 2014. He made his first team – and Série A – debut on 11 December 2016, coming on as a late substitute for fellow youth graduate Christian in a 1–0 away loss to Santos, as his side was already relegated.

Zé Ricardo established himself as a starter during the 2017 Série B, as his side achieved promotion as champions, and renewed his contract until December 2022 on 13 January 2018. He scored his first senior goal on 6 August 2019, netting his side's fourth in a 4–3 home win over Londrina.

Zé Ricardo played his 100th match for Coelho on 11 November 2019, in a 2–0 away win over Cuiabá. He reached the 200 matches milestone on 25 May 2022, in a 3–0 Copa Libertadores away loss to Independiente del Valle.

Zé Ricardo left América after nearly ten years in February 2023, as his contract was due to expire.

=== Ceará ===
On 20 April 2023, Zé Ricardo was announced at Ceará in the second division. He only featured in 17 matches before leaving.

=== Portuguesa ===
On 22 December 2023, Zé Ricardo signed with Portuguesa for the 2024 Campeonato Paulista.

== Career statistics ==
As of 18 March 2024

Club	Season	League			State League		Cup		Continental		Other		Total	
Club	Season	Division	Apps	Goals	Apps	Goals	Apps	Goals	Apps	Goals	Apps	Goals	Apps	Goals
América Mineiro	2016	Série A	1	0	0	0	0	0	—		—		1	0
América Mineiro	2017	Série B	27	0	1	0	0	0	—		0	0	28	0
América Mineiro	2018	Série A	18	0	12	0	0	0	—		—		30	0
América Mineiro	2019	Série B	29	1	13	0	2	0	—		—		44	1
América Mineiro	2020	Série B	27	0	10	0	10	0	—		—		47	0
América Mineiro	2021	Série A	16	0	12	1	2	0	—		—		30	1
América Mineiro	2022	Série A	9	0	10	0	1	0	3 (Note: Appearance(s) in Copa Sudamericana)	0	—		23	0
América Mineiro	2023	Série A	0	0	0	0	0	0	0	0	—		0	0
América Mineiro	Total		127	1	58	1	15	0	3	0	0	0	203	2
Ceará	2023	Série B	17	0	—		—		—		—		17	0
Portuguesa	2024	Paulista	—		10	0	—		—		—		10	0
Career total			144	1	68	1	15	0	3	0	0	0	230	2

== Honours ==
América Mineiro

- Campeonato Brasileiro Série B: 2017

Avaí

- Campeonato Catarinense: 2025
