= Alvinópolis =

Municipality of Brazil

Coordinates: 20°06′25″S 43°02′56″W

- Municipality
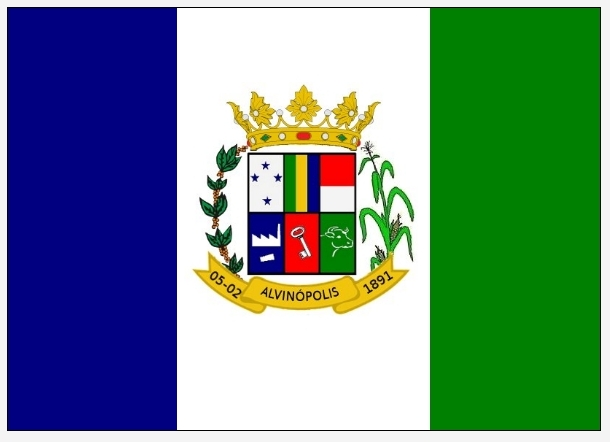
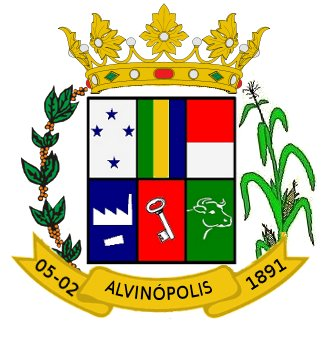
- Flag Coat of arms
- Interactive map of Alvinópolis
- Country: Brazil
- State: Minas Gerais
- Region: Southeast
- Time zone: UTC−3 (BRT)

Location of Alvinópolis within Minas Gerais

Alvinópolis is a Brazilian municipality in the state of Minas Gerais. As of 2020 its population is estimated to be 15,169. The city belongs to the mesoregion Metropolitana de Belo Horizonte and to the microregion of Itabira.

== See also ==
- List of municipalities in Minas Gerais
