= Nova Era =

Coordinates: 19°45′00″S 43°02′16″W

- Municipality
- Municipality of Nova Era
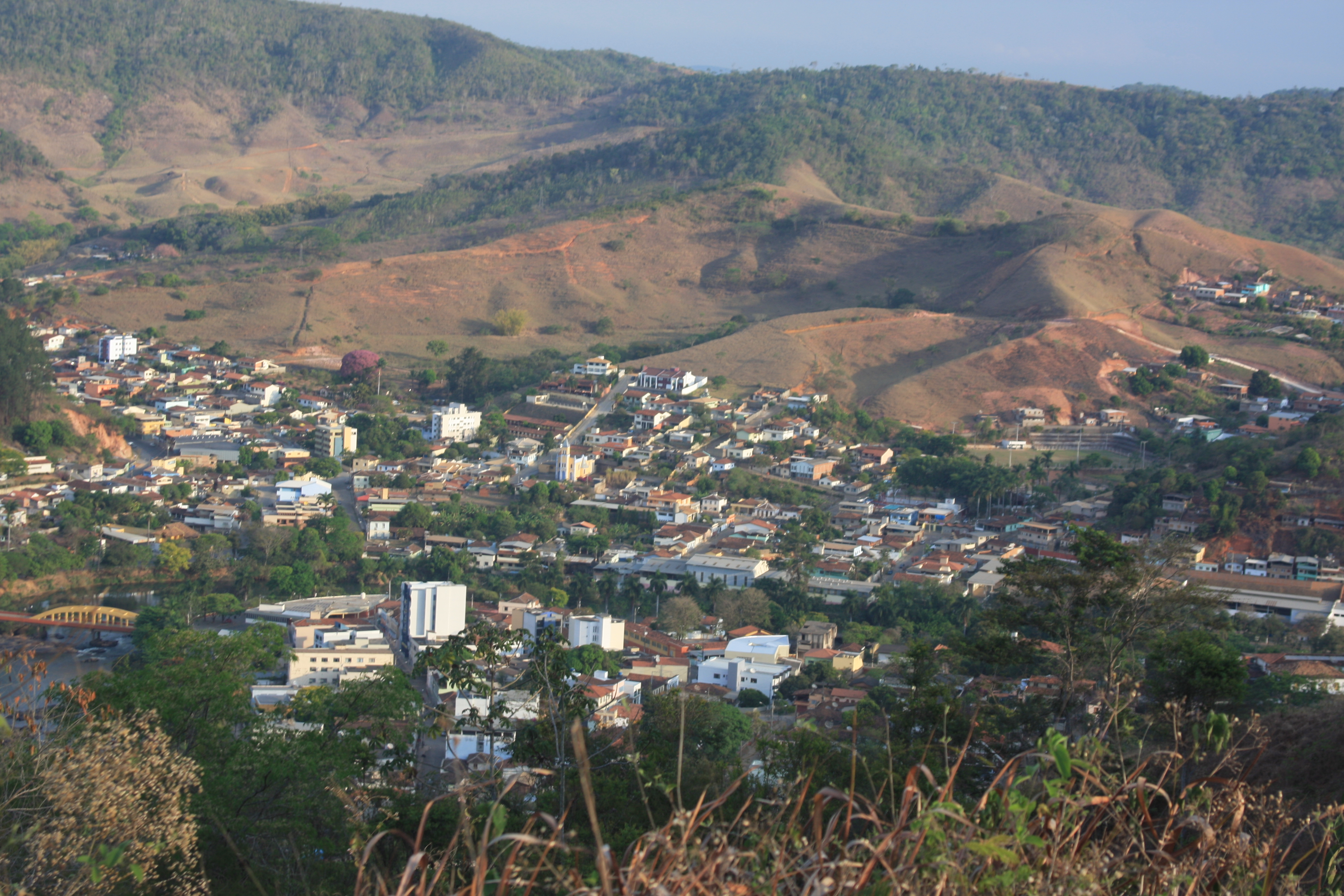
- Partial view of Nova Era

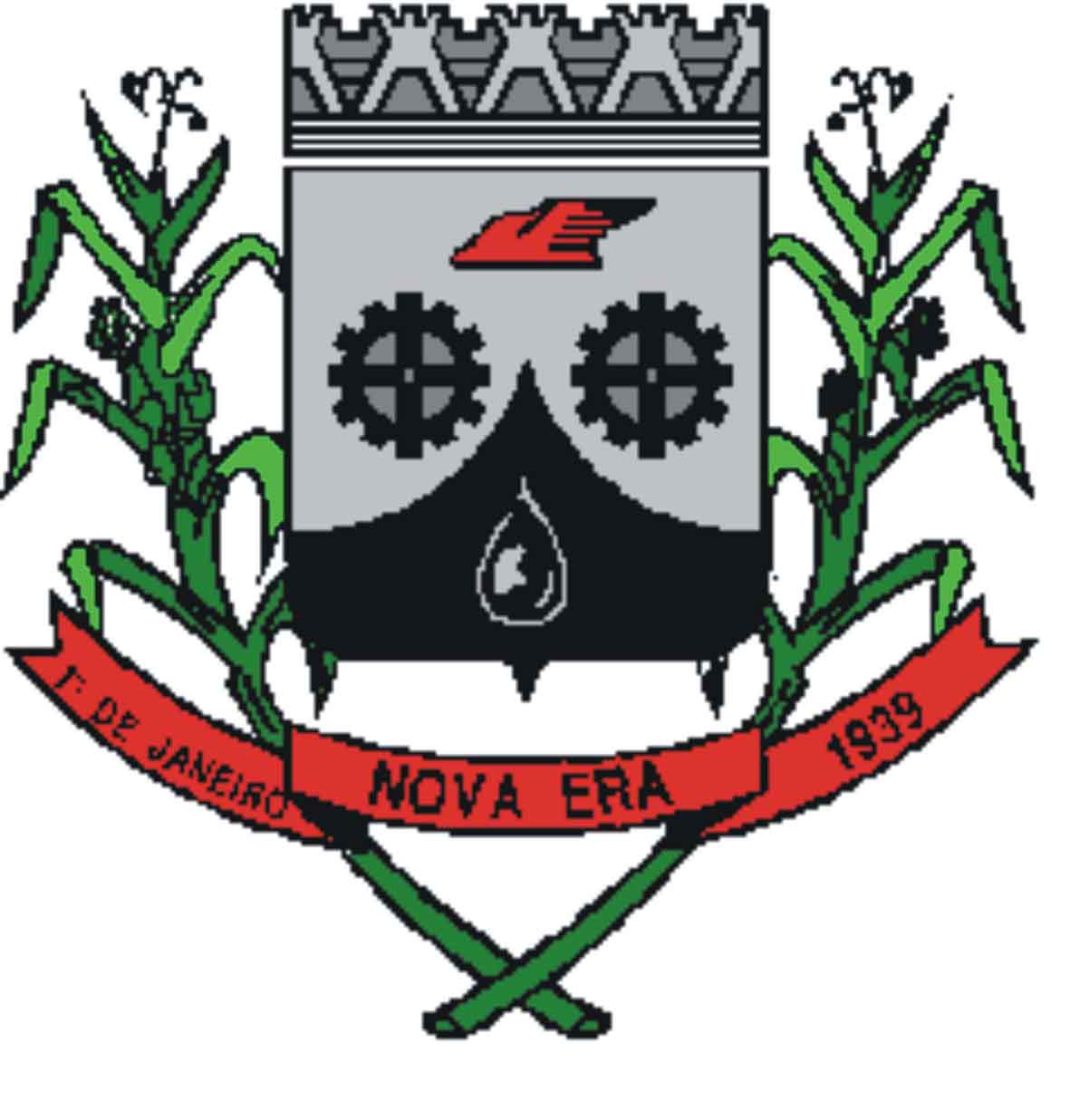
- Flag Coat of arms

- Country: Brazil
- Region: Southeast
- State: Minas Gerais
- Founded: 17 December 1938

Government
  - Mayor: Taxi Silva Costa (REDE, 2021-2024)

Area
  - Total: 361.926 km^{2} (139.740 sq mi)
- Elevation: 526 m (1,726 ft)

Population (2021)
  - Total: 17,528
  - Density: 48.43/km^{2} (125.4/sq mi)
- Demonym: nova-erense
- Time zone: UTC−3 (BRT)
- Postal Code: 35920-000 to 35929-999
- HDI (2010): 0.709 – high
- Website: www.novaera.mg.gov.br

Nova Era is a Brazilian municipality located in the state of Minas Gerais. The city belongs to the mesoregion of Belo Horizonte and to the microregion of Itabira. As of 2020, the estimated population was 17,551.

== See also ==
- List of municipalities in Minas Gerais
