= Koerberia =

Scientific classification
- Domain: Eukaryota
- Kingdom: Fungi
- Division: Ascomycota
- Class: Lecanoromycetes
- Order: Peltigerales
- Family: Koerberiaceae
- Genus: Koerberia; A.Massal. (1854)

Type species
- Koerberia biformis A.Massal. (1854)

Genus of lichen-forming fungi

Koerberia is a genus of lichen-forming fungi in the family Koerberiaceae.

The genus name of Koerberia is in honour of Gustav Wilhelm Körber (1817–1885), who was a German lichenologist.

The genus was circumscribed by Abramo Bartolommeo Massalongo in Geneacaena vol.4 on page 6 in 1854.
