= Koerberiaceae =

Scientific classification
- Kingdom: Fungi
- Division: Ascomycota
- Class: Lecanoromycetes
- Order: Peltigerales
- Family: Koerberiaceae; T.Sprib. & Muggia (2012)

Genera
- Henssenia; Koerberia; Tingiopsidium

Family of lichen-forming fungi

Koerberiaceae is a small family of lichen-forming fungi in the order Peltigerales. It contains 3 genera and 9 species. The family was proposed by Toby Spribille and Lucia Muggia in 2012, after molecular phylogenetic analysis revealed the existence of three lineages of lichen-forming fungi in the suborder Peltigerineae of the order Peltigerales. The lineages represented the genera Steinera, Koerberia (the type genus of the family), and Vestergrenopsis. The latter genus was later folded into synonymy with Tingiopsidium.

Steinera, circumscribed by Alexander Zahlbruckner in 1906, was previously classified in family Koerberiaceae, but the genus and many of its species were transferred to the family Arctomiaceae in 2017, and a new genus Henssenia was created to contain the remaining species.

== Description ==
Members of the Koerberiaceae have thalli that are squamulose (scaley) to placodioid, and have deep grooves on the upper surface that radiate outward from the centre of the thallus. The photobiont partner is a cyanobacteria, either from genus Nostoc or from the family Scytonemataceae; they are bundled together in rows under the upper cortex. Species have cylindrical apothecia that are more-or-less lecanorine in form. Ascospores number eight per ascus, are ellipsoid to long and needle-shaped (acicular), and are variably septate.

== Genera ==
- Henssenia Ertz, R.S.Poulsen & Søchting (2017) – 4 spp.
- Koerberia A.Massal. (1854) – 1 sp.
- Tingiopsidium Werner (1939) – 4 spp.
