= Rio Piracicaba =

Brazilian municipality

Coordinates: 19°55′44″S 43°10′26″W

- Municipality
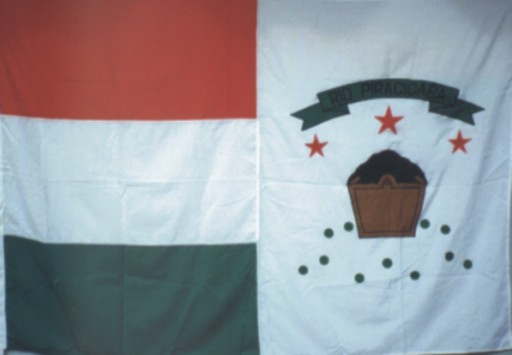
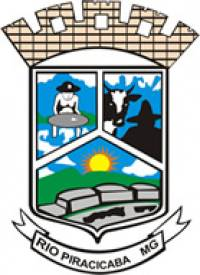
- Flag Coat of arms
- Interactive map of Rio Piracicaba
- Country: Brazil
- State: Minas Gerais
- Region: Southeast
- Time zone: UTC−3 (BRT)

Location of Rio Piracicaba within Minas Gerais

Rio Piracicaba is a Brazilian municipality located in the state of Minas Gerais. The city belongs to the mesoregion Metropolitana de Belo Horizonte and to the microregion of Itabira. It has two rural districts: Conceição de Piracicaba (better known as "Jorge") and Padre Pinto (better known as "Caxambu"). As of 2020, the estimated population was 14,332.

== See also ==
- List of municipalities in Minas Gerais
