= Bom Jesus do Amparo =

Town in Brazil

Coordinates: 19°42′14″S 43°28′26″W

- Municipality
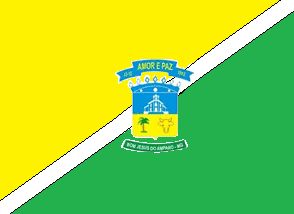
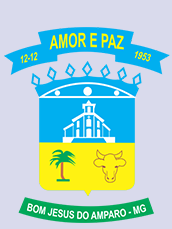
- Flag Coat of arms
- Interactive map of Bom Jesus do Amparo
- Country: Brazil
- State: Minas Gerais
- Region: Southeast

Population (2022 Census)
  - Total: 5,631
  - Estimate (2025): 5,786
- Time zone: UTC−3 (BRT)

Location of Bom Jesus do Amparo within Minas Gerais

Bom Jesus do Amparo is a Brazilian municipality in the state of Minas Gerais. The city is part of the mesoregion Metropolitana de Belo Horizonte and the microregion of Itabira. As of 2025, the estimated population was 5,786.

== See also ==
- List of municipalities in Minas Gerais
