= Catas Altas =

Coordinates: 20°4′30″S 43°24′28″W

- Municipality
- Municipality of Catas Altas
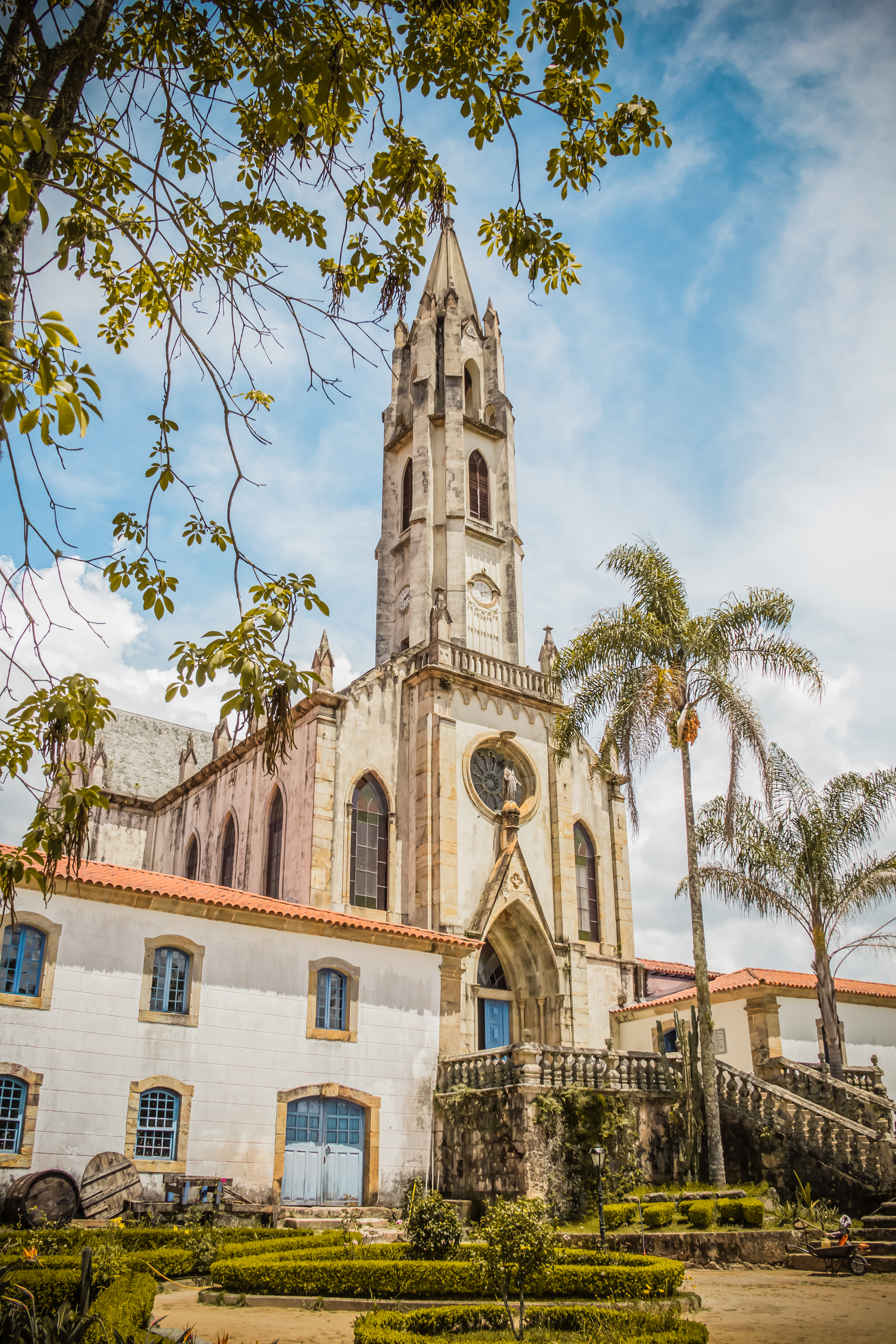
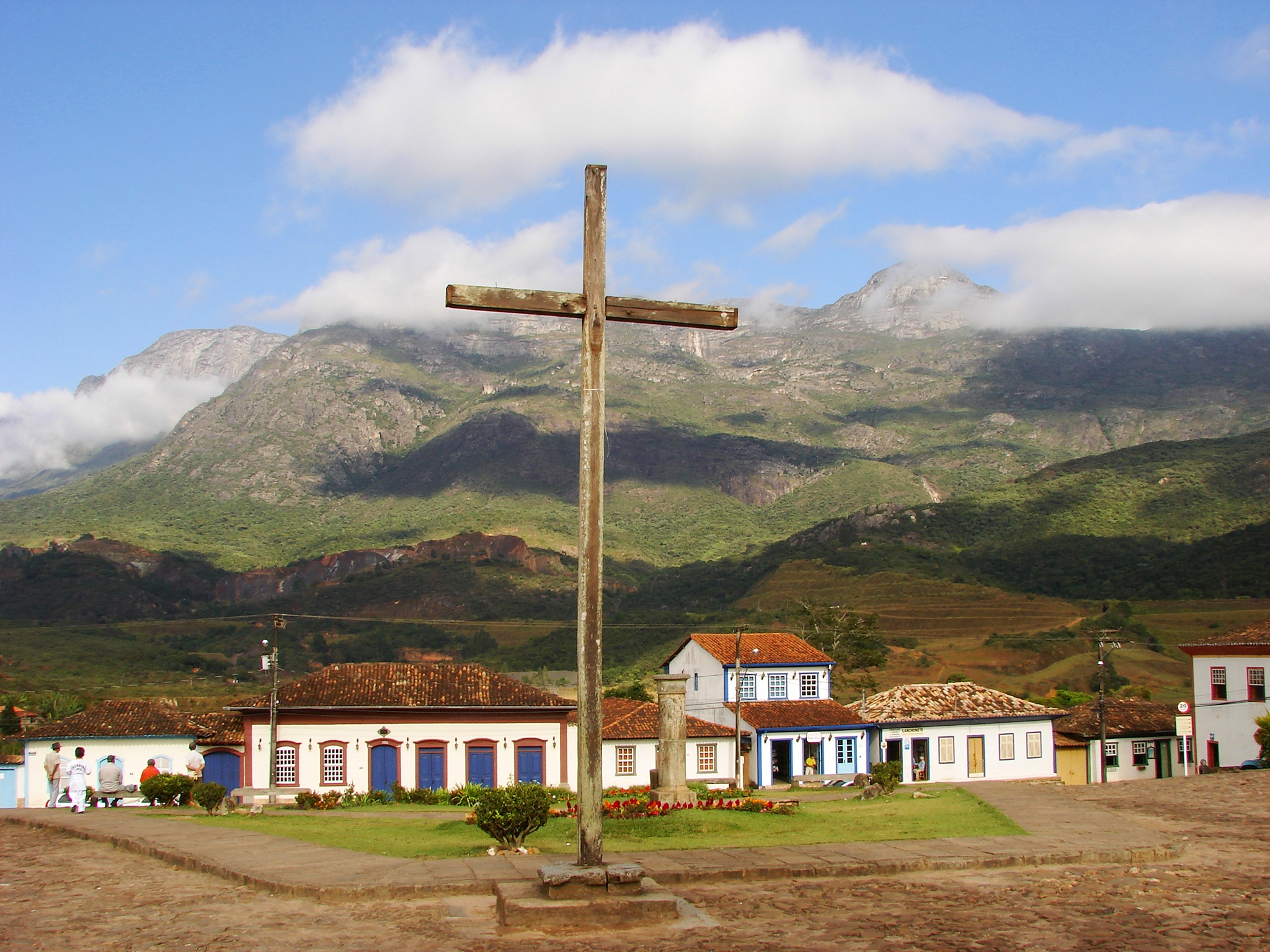
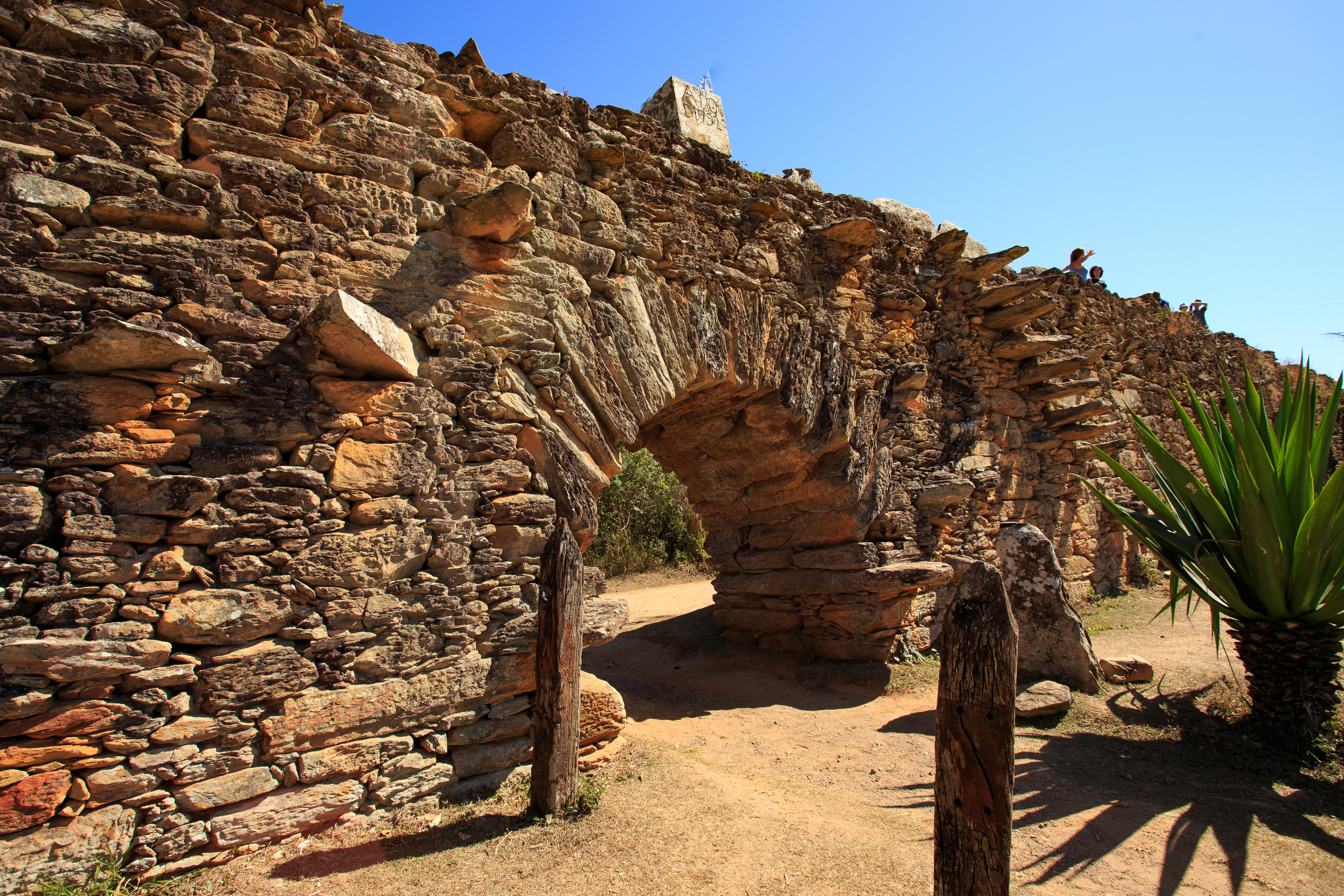
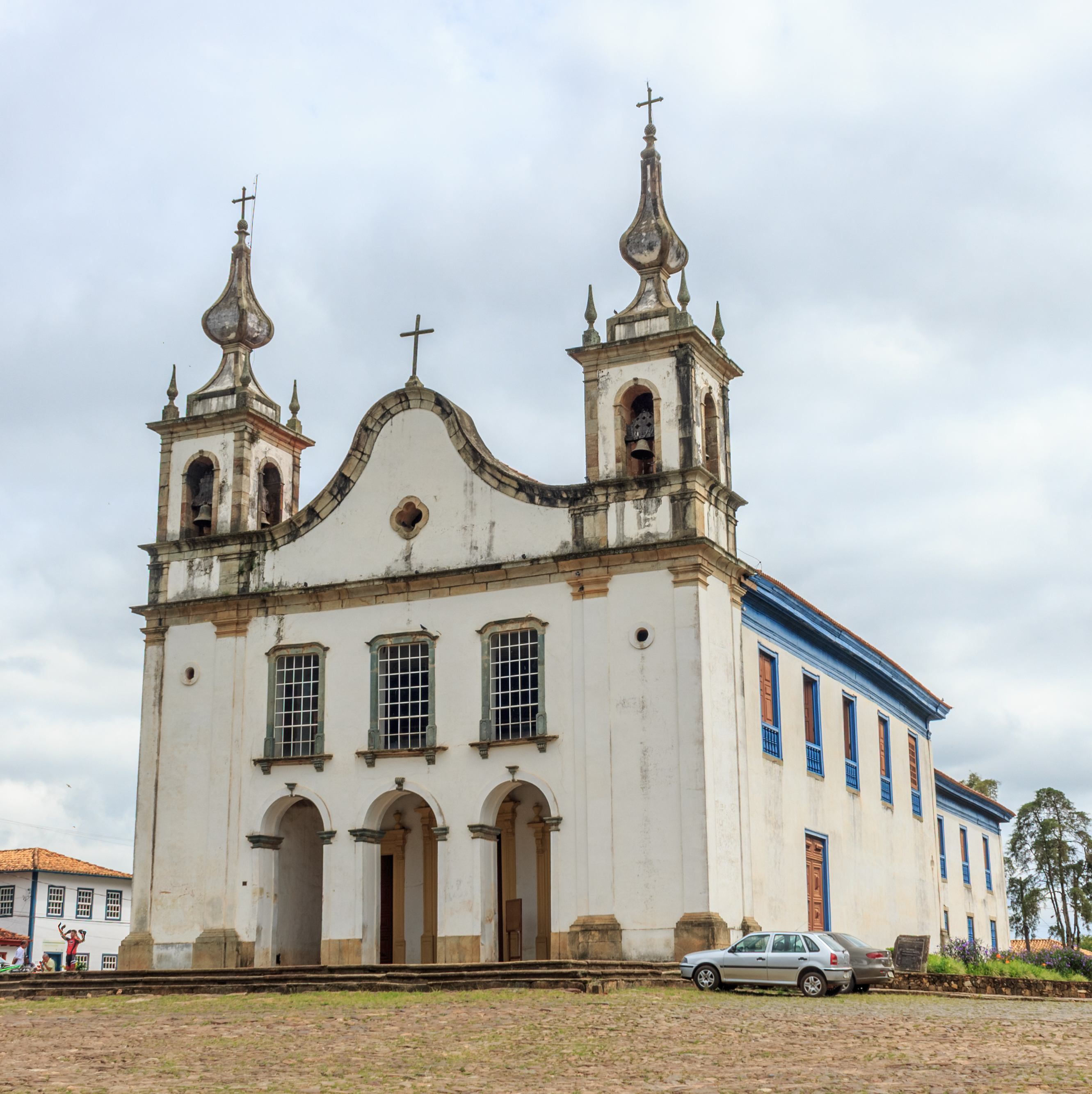
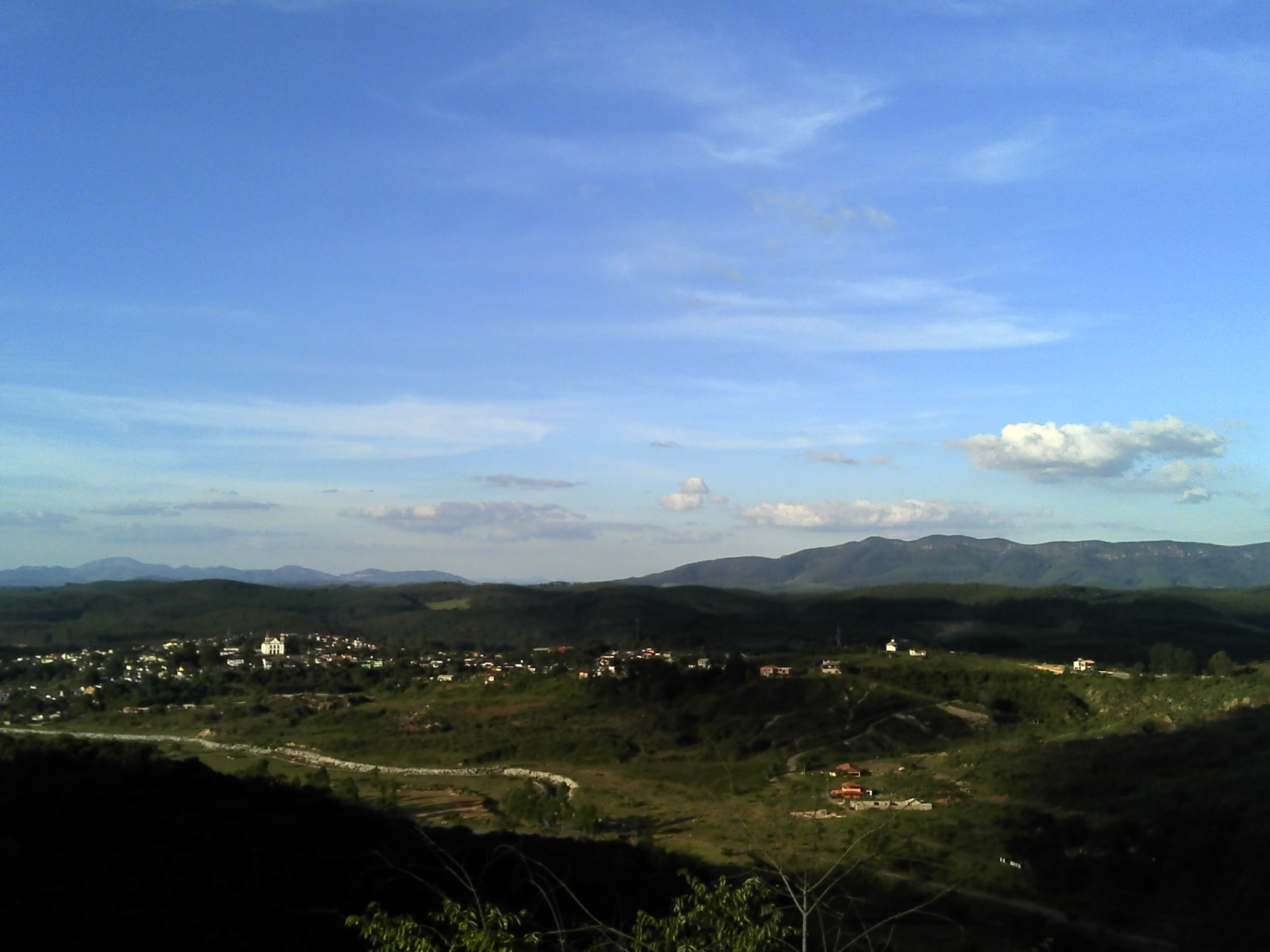
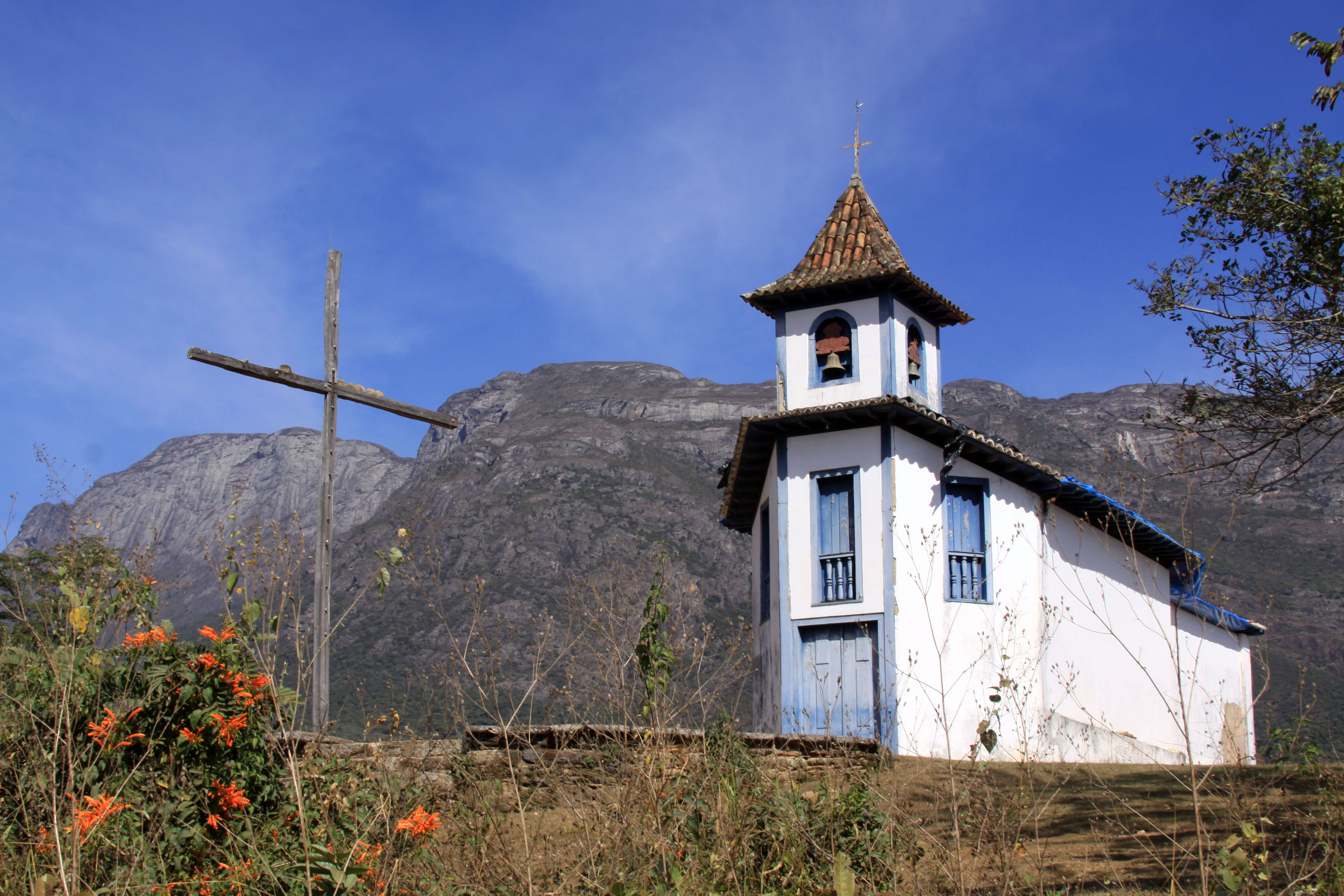

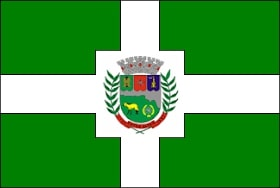
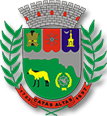
- Flag Coat of arms

- Country: Brazil
- Region: Southeast
- State: Minas Gerais
- Founded: 8 December 1703

Government
  - Mayor: Saulo Morais (PATRI)

Area
  - Total: 240.042 km^{2} (92.681 sq mi)
- Elevation: 745 m (2,444 ft)

Population (2022 Census)
  - Total: 5,473
  - Estimate (2025): 5,706
  - Density: 20.19/km^{2} (52.3/sq mi)
- Demonym: catas-altense
- Time zone: UTC−3 (BRT)
- HDI (2010): 0.684 – medium
- Website: www.catasaltas.mg.gov.br

Catas Altas is a Brazilian municipality located in the state of Minas Gerais. The city belongs to the mesoregion Metropolitana de Belo Horizonte and to the microregion of Itabira. As of 2025, the estimated population was 5,473.

== See also ==
- List of municipalities in Minas Gerais
- Our Lady Mother of Men Church
