= BR-381 =

Highway in Brazil

BR-381

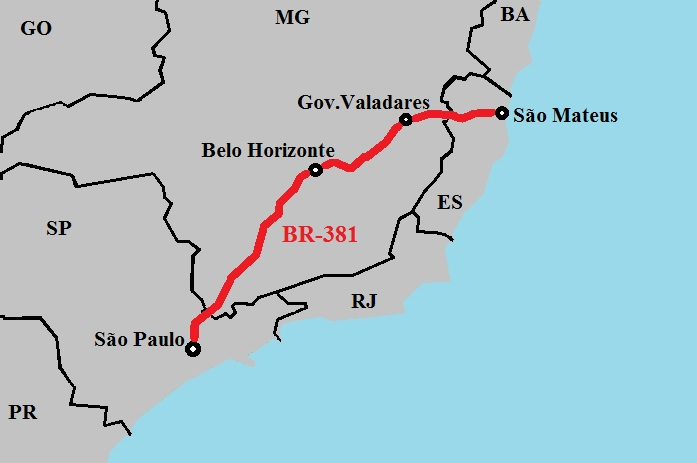

Route information
- Length: 1,185 km (736 mi)

Major junctions
- North end: BR-101 in São Mateus, Espírito Santo
- BR-101 BR-342 BR-259 BR-451 BR-116 BR-458 BR-262 BR-369 BR-354 BR-265
- South end: Rodovia Presidente Dutra in Guarulhos, São Paulo

Location
- Country: Brazil

Highway system
- Highways in Brazil; Federal

The BR-381 is a Brazilian diagonal federal highway that begins in the city of São Mateus, Espírito Santo, at the junction with BR-101, reaching the city of São Paulo, at the junction with BR-116 (Rodovia Presidente Dutra). It has a total of 1185.2 kilometerss, of which 93.6 are in São Paulo, 943.9 in Minas Gerais and 147.7 in Espírito Santo. The stretch between Belo Horizonte and São Paulo is called Rodovia Fernão Dias.

The stretch that connects the states of Minas Gerais and Espírito Santo is also considered one of the most dangerous road stretches in Brazil, due to its extremely winding route, causing accidents on a daily basis.

In the state of Espírito Santo, the concession for the highway was given to the state government, and in that state it was called ES-381. Still in Espírito Santo, the 64-kilometer stretch between the cities of São Mateus and Nova Venécia is named Miguel Curry Carneiro and corresponds to the old bed of an extinct local railway, the Estrada de Ferro São Mateus.

== Duplications ==
In 2002, after 8 years of works, the duplication of the 562 km of the stretch known as Rodovia Fernão Dias, between Belo Horizonte and São Paulo was completed. In 2022, a project was created to grant part of BR-381 to the private sector, with the intention of doubling 215 km between Belo Horizonte, Ipatinga and Novo Oriente de Minas.

== Main municipalities crossed by BR-381 ==
=== São Paulo ===
- São Paulo
- Guarulhos
- Mairiporã
- Atibaia
- Bragança Paulista
- Vargem

=== Minas Gerais ===
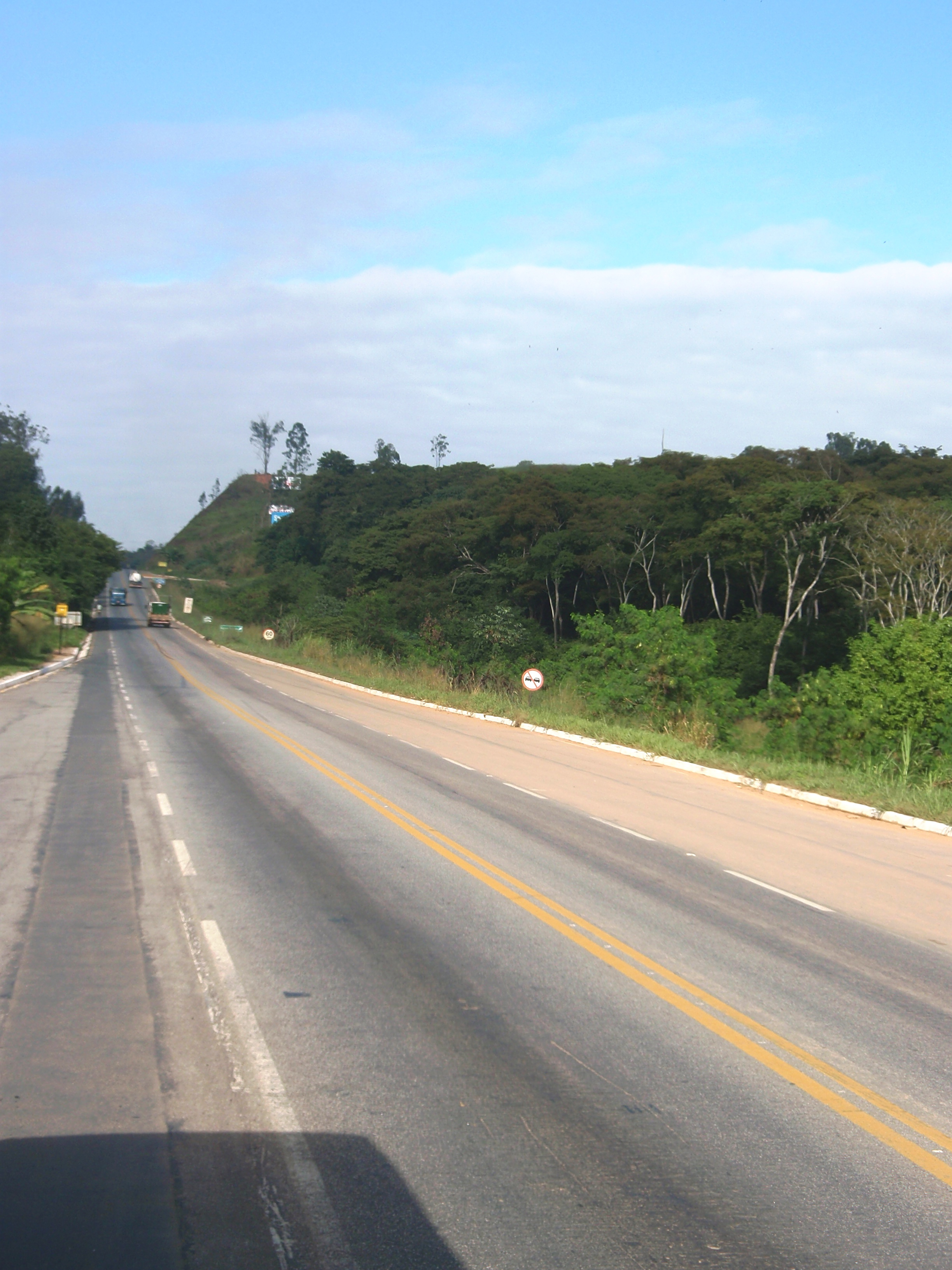
BR-381 in Santana do Paraíso, na Vale do Aco Metropolitan Area.

- Extrema
- Itapeva
- Camanducaia
- Cambuí
- Estiva
- Pouso Alegre
- São Sebastião da Bela Vista
- Careaçu
- São Gonçalo do Sapucaí
- Campanha
- Três Corações
- Varginha
- Carmo da Cachoeira
- Nepomuceno
- Lavras
- Ribeirão Vermelho
- Perdões
- Santo Antônio do Amparo
- Oliveira
- Carmópolis de Minas
- Itaguara
- Itatiaiuçu
- Rio Manso
- Brumadinho
- Igarapé
- São Joaquim de Bicas
- Betim
- Contagem
- Belo Horizonte
- Santa Luzia
- Sabará
- Caeté
- Nova União
- Bom Jesus do Amparo
- Barão de Cocais
- São Gonçalo do Rio Abaixo
- João Monlevade
- Bela Vista de Minas
- Nova Era
- Antônio Dias
- Jaguaraçu
- Timóteo
- Coronel Fabriciano
- Ipatinga
- Santana do Paraíso
- Belo Oriente
- Naque
- Periquito
- Governador Valadares
- Galileia
- Divino das Laranjeiras
- Central de Minas
- São João do Manteninha
- Mantena

=== Espírito Santo ===
- Barra de São Francisco
- Nova Venécia
- São Mateus
