= Rodovia Fernão Dias =

Highway in Brazil

BR-381
- Rodovia Fernão Dias
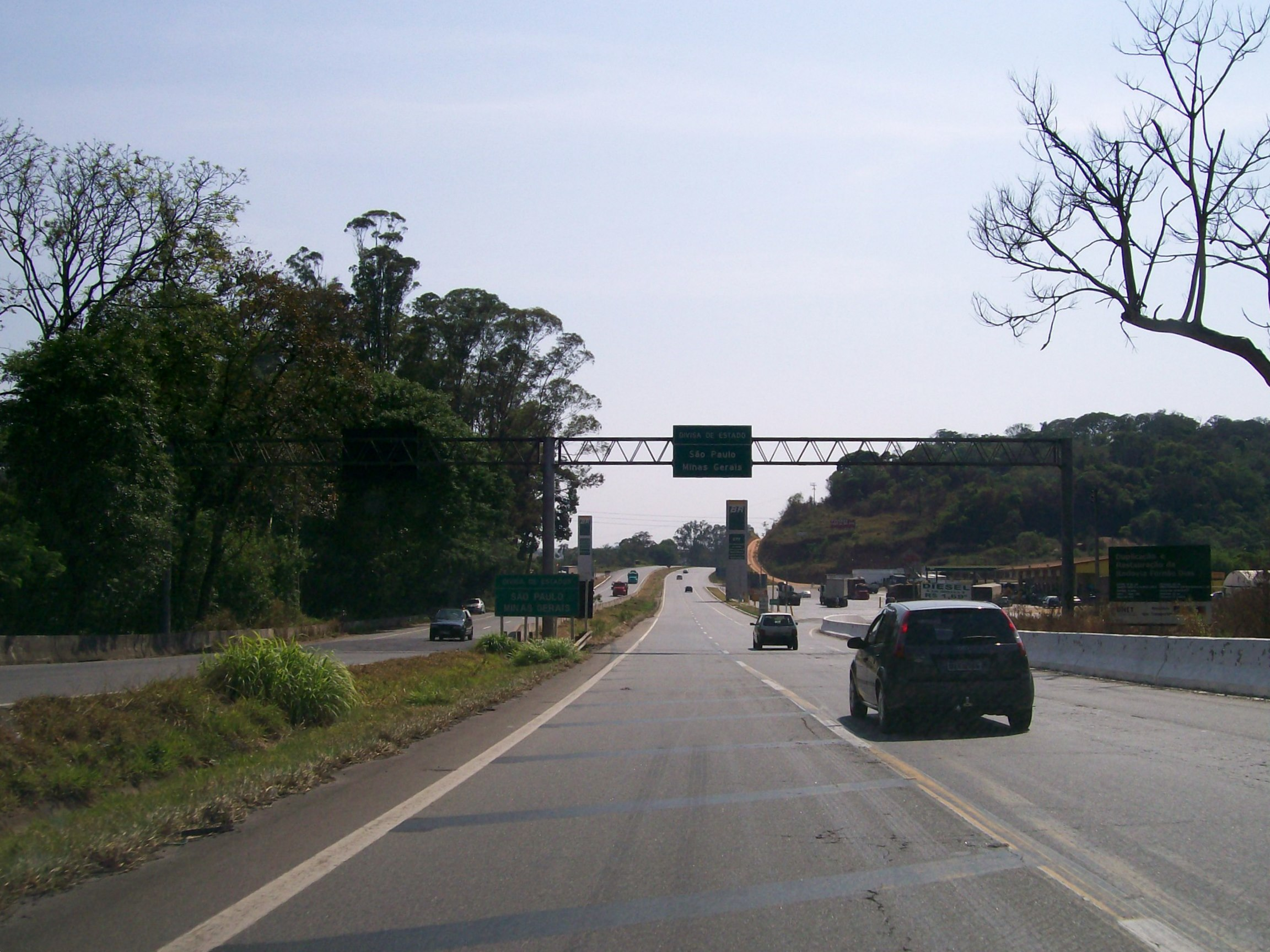
- The Fernão Dias highway near the border between the states of São Paulo and Minas Gerais.

Route information
- Maintained by Autopista Fernão Dias (OHL) (since 2008)
- Length: 562.1 km (349.3 mi)
- Existed: 1959 (duplication made to a Dual carriageway in 2005)–present

Major junctions
- North end: Avenida Cardeal Eugênio Pacelli in Contagem, MG
- South end: Avenida Educador Paulo Freire in Vila Maria, São Paulo, SP

Location
- Country: Brazil

Highway system
- Highways in Brazil; Federal

The Rodovia Fernão Dias (official designation BR-381 or SP-010 in the state of São Paulo) is a federal highway which runs in the Brazilian states of São Paulo and southern region of Minas Gerais. In Atibaia, the Fernão Dias highway intersects the Dom Pedro I highway, which runs from Campinas to Jacareí.

The highway is thus named in honour of Fernão Dias Paes Leme, a Brazilian explorer and "bandeirante" of the 17th century. It is 562.1 km long. It was fully duplicated in 2002.

== Major cities cut by the BR-381 ==
=== São Paulo ===
- São Paulo
- Guarulhos
- Mairiporã
- Atibaia
- Bragança Paulista
- Vargem

=== Minas Gerais ===
- Belo Horizonte
- Betim
- Camanducaia
- Carmo da Cachoeira
- Contagem
- Igarapé
- Itapeva
- Lavras
- Nepomuceno
- Carmopolis de Minas
- Oliveira
- Pouso Alegre
- Santo Antônio do Amparo
- São Joaquim de Bicas
- Três Corações
- João Monlevade
- Vale do Aço (Metropolitan area)
- Extrema
- Governador Valadares

== Location of the toll plazas ==
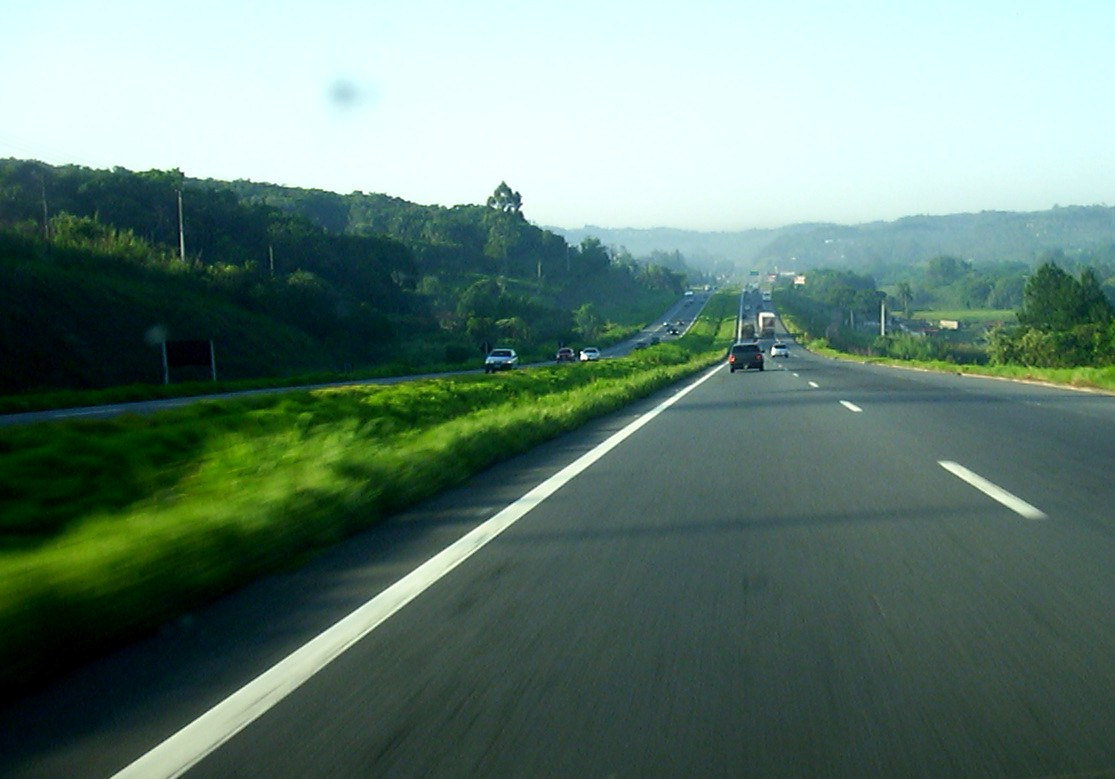
The Fernão Dias highway near the city of Atibaia.

=== São Paulo ===
- Km 017 - Mairiporã
- Km 007 - Vargem

=== Minas Gerais ===
- Km 902 - Cambuí
- Km 804 - São Gonçalo do Sapucaí
- Km 733 - Carmo da Cachoeira
- Km 659 - Santo Antonio do Amparo
- Km 596 - Carmópolis de Minas
- Km 546 - Itatiaiuçu

Note: All squares are bidirectional.

== See also ==
- Brazilian Highway System
- Highway system of São Paulo
