= João Monlevade =

Municipality in Minas Gerais, Brazil

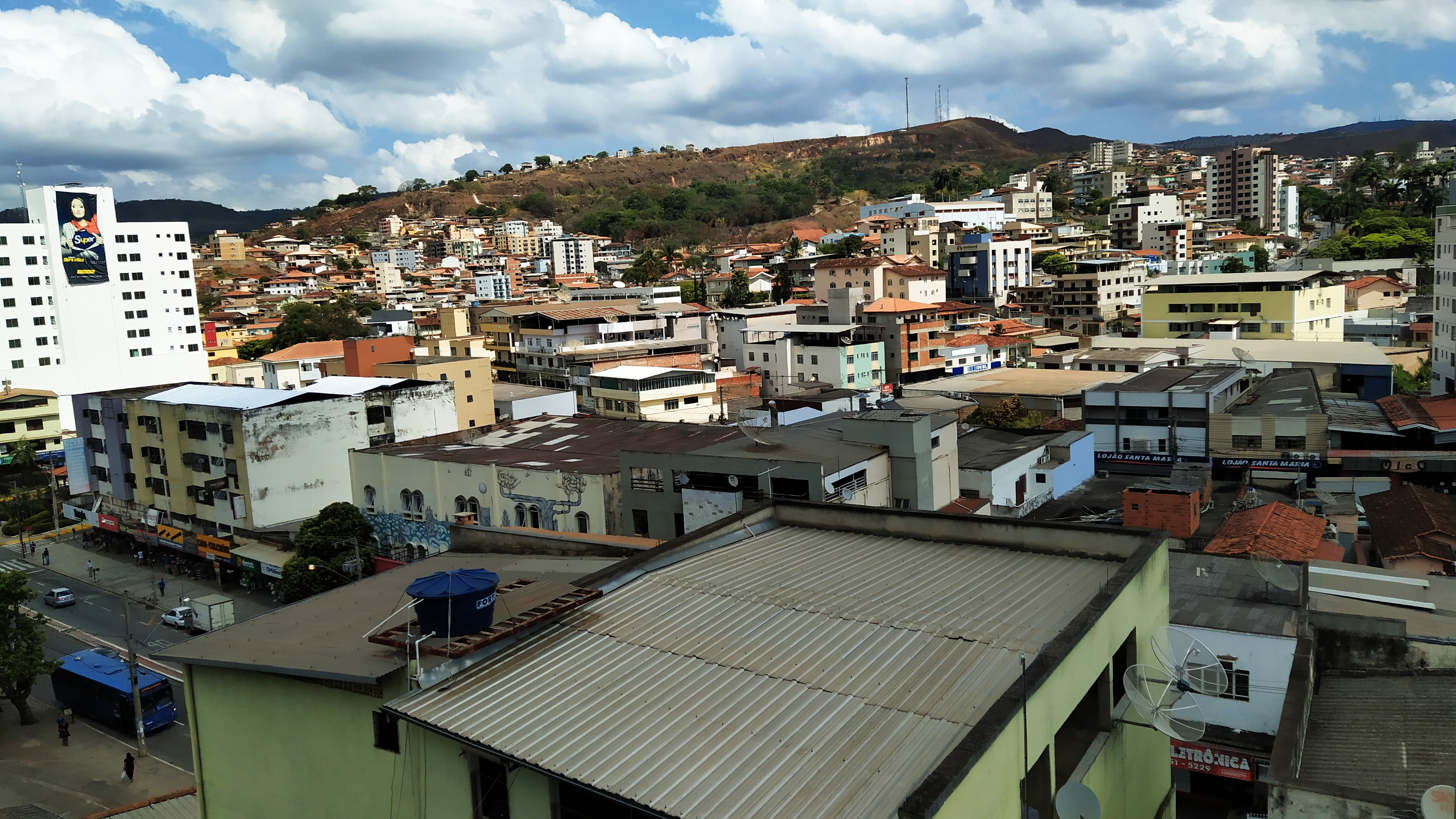
- Partial view of João Monlevade

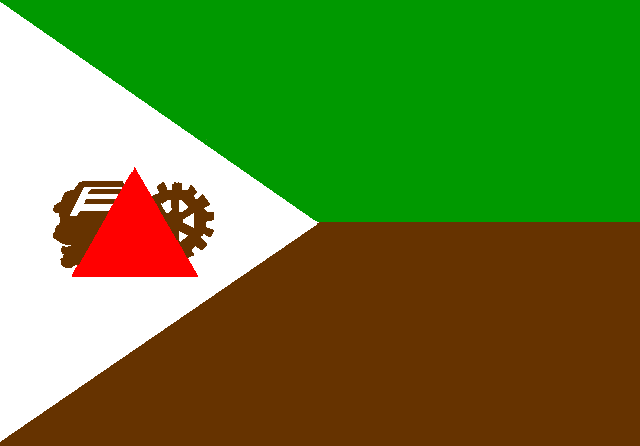
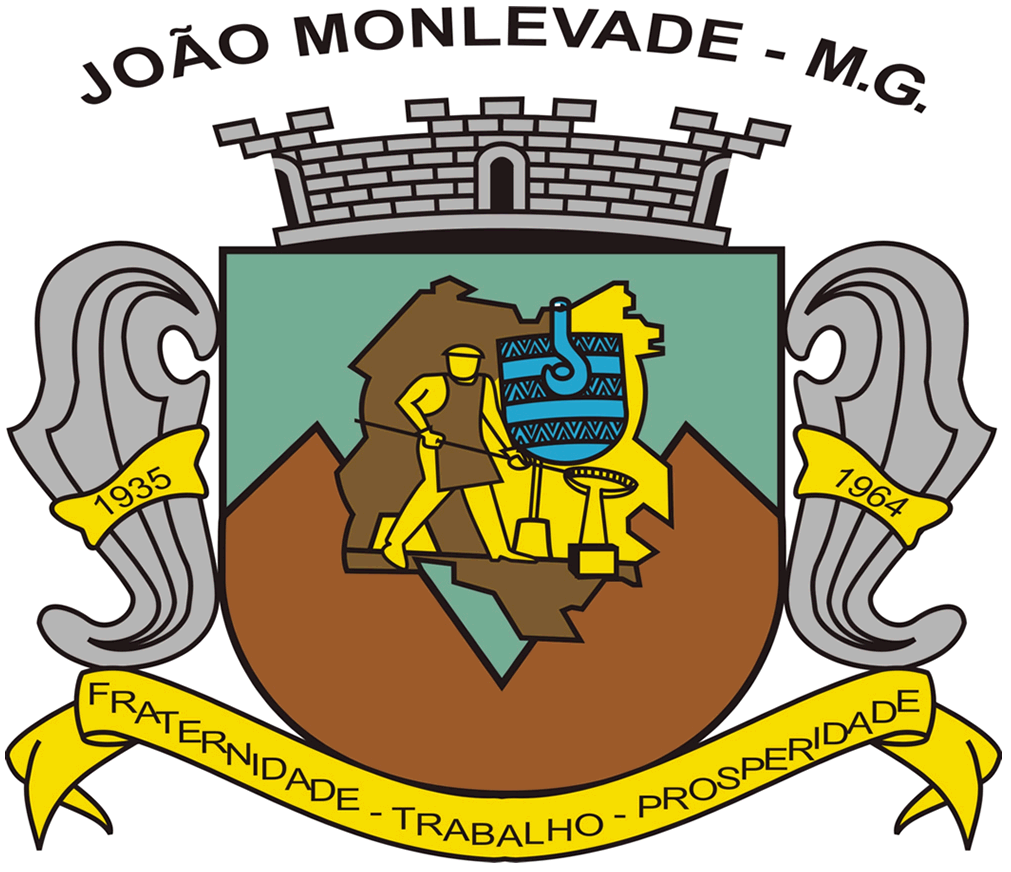
- Flag Coat of arms
- Motto(s): Fraternity, work, prosperity

- Location in Brazil
- Coordinates: 19°48′36″S 43°10′26″W
- Country: Brazil
- Region: Southeast
- State: Minas Gerais
- Bordering municipalities: Itabira, Bela Vista de Minas, São Gonçalo do Rio Abaixo, and Rio Piracicaba
- Distance to the capital: 110 km
- Established: April 29, 1964

Government
  - Mayor: Laércio Ribeiro (PT)
  - Term ends: 2024

Area
  - City: 99.158 km^{2} (38.285 sq mi)
  - Urban (Embrapa/2015): 29.104 km^{2} (11.237 sq mi)
- Elevation: 732 m (2,402 ft)

Population (IBGE Estimate/2024)
  - City: 83,360
  - Density: 840.7/km^{2} (2,177/sq mi)
- Demonym: Monlevadense
- Time zone: UTC−3 (BRT)
- Postal code: 35930-000 to 35934-999
- Climate: Humid subtropical (Cwa)
- HDI (UNDP/2010): 0.758
- GDP (IBGE/2014): R$2,371,841
- GDP per capita (IBGE/2014): R$30,392.63
- Patron saint: Our Lady of the Immaculate Conception
- Website: pmjm.mg.gov.br

João Monlevade is a Brazilian municipality located in the interior of the state of Minas Gerais, in the Southeast Region of Brazil. It is situated east of the state capital, Belo Horizonte, approximately 110 kilometers away. The municipality covers an area of 99.158 km^{2} (38.285 sq mi), of which 29.1 km^{2} (11.2 sq mi) is classified as urban area, with a population of 83,360 inhabitants in 2024.

João Monlevade was emancipated in the 20th century, specifically in 1964, with its development largely driven by the establishment of ArcelorMittal Aços Longos (formerly Companhia Siderúrgica Belgo-Mineira) in 1921. The municipality currently comprises nearly sixty neighborhoods, and it boasts various natural, historical, and cultural attractions, including the São José do Operário Mother Church, constructed in the 1940s, and the Catalan Forge, with its imposing and renowned headquarters (Fazenda Solar), built to house Jean-Antoine Félix Dissandes de Monlevade, the pioneer after whom the municipality is named.

== History ==
=== Origins ===
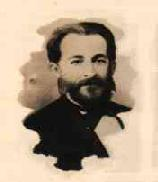
Jean-Antoine Félix Dissandes de Monlevade, founder of the city.

Until the early 19th century, the region now occupied by João Monlevade was merely dense, untouched forest. In August 1817, the French engineer Jean-Antoine Félix Dissandes de Monlevade arrived in the area. In what was then the Province of Minas Gerais, Jean conducted a mineralogical and geological study of the soil, which led to the discovery of extensive mineral deposits suitable for iron production.

Following this discovery, the Frenchman traveled through various districts, such as Sabará, Caeté, and São Miguel de Piracicaba, where he acquired several land grants and built a Catalan forge, as well as his residence, the Solar Monlevade, in 1818. He established a factory that achieved great success, becoming one of the largest during the imperial period, producing everything from hoes to bridles. In 1935, another major industry, the Companhia Siderúrgica Belgo-Mineira (now ArcelorMittal Aços Longos), was established with the assistance of engineer Louis Ensch, sparking significant urban development. This period saw the construction of 3,000 homes, the Margarida Hospital, and the São José do Operário Mother Church, alongside improvements in roads, schools, and local commerce. The area was then known as the Industrial Center of the Rio Piracicaba and Carneirinhos District.

In 2022, a documentary titled The Luxembourg Colony, directed by Dominique Santana, was released, chronicling the history of Monlevade from the arrival of Louis Ensch.

=== Political and administrative evolution ===
The area was originally part of the municipality of Rio Piracicaba. On 27 December 1948, by state law no. 336, the district of João Monlevade was created, named in honor of the engineer who pioneered the region. The district was elevated to municipality status by state law no. 2764 on 30 December 1962 and was officially established on 1 March 1963, consisting solely of the District Seat. Full municipal autonomy was achieved on 29 April 1964.

The first election was held in 1965, and on 5 December of that year, the first councilors (13 in total, with Sebastião Batista Gomes as president, João Amaro Gomes as vice-president, and Ronaldo Frade as secretary) took office, along with the mayor, Wilson Alvarenga, and his deputy mayor, Josué Henrique Dias. The João Monlevade Judicial District was established in 1975 and installed in 1979.

=== Post-emancipation development ===
The city's urban growth necessitated improvements in infrastructure. In addition to the Margarida Hospital and the Monlevade Gymnasium, built in the 1950s, other significant developments during this period included the establishment of the Commercial Association, the Educational Foundation (later FUNCEC), and the installation of Minas Gerais Telecommunications (Telemig) and the Energy Company of Minas Gerais (Cemig), which brought telephone services and electricity to the city, respectively. Between the 1970s and 1980s, there was increased investment in the cultural sector, including the construction of the Louis Ensch Municipal Stadium.

Today, the rural landscape is increasingly being replaced by urban development to meet the demands of urban expansion, driven by growth in productive activities (industry, commerce, and services) and rising housing needs due to population concentration. The boundary between rural and urban areas is becoming less distinct, and the rural population is declining each year.

== Geography ==
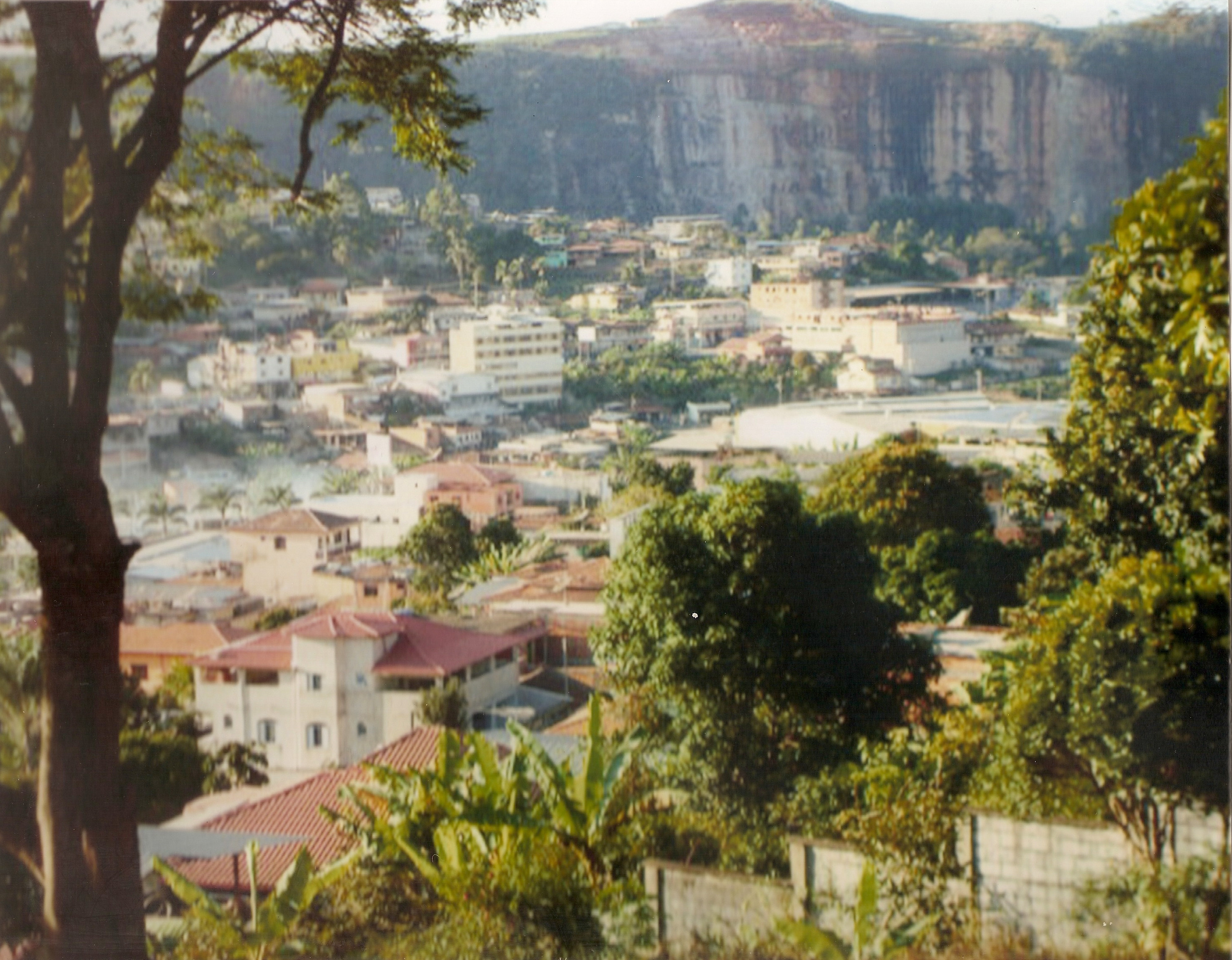
Partial view of the city with rocky formations in the background. The municipality is characterized by mountainous terrain, with rolling hills and mountains.

According to the Brazilian Institute of Geography and Statistics (IBGE), the municipality spans an area of 99.158 km², of which 29.104 km² constitutes the urban area. It is located at 19°48′36″ south latitude and 43°10′26″ west longitude, approximately 110 kilometers east of the state capital, Belo Horizonte. Its neighboring municipalities are Bela Vista de Minas to the east, São Gonçalo do Rio Abaixo to the west, Rio Piracicaba to the south, and Itabira to the north.

Based on the regional division effective since 2017, as established by the IBGE, the municipality is part of the Intermediate Geographic Region of Ipatinga and the Immediate Geographic Region of João Monlevade. Previously, under the division into microregions and mesoregions, it was part of the Itabira microregion, which was included in the Metropolitan Mesoregion of Belo Horizonte.

The city center has an average elevation of 580.57 meters. The highest point in the municipality is in the Serra do Seara, reaching an elevation of 1,340 meters. The terrain is predominantly mountainous, with 68% of the municipal territory consisting of rolling hills and mountains, 20% undulating areas, and the remaining 12% flat terrain. The lowest elevation is found at the Jacuí Stream.

The municipality lies within the Doce River Basin, and it is drained by the Piracicaba and Santa Bárbara rivers. Like most municipalities in Minas Gerais, João Monlevade is surrounded by mountains and rocky formations. Some parts of the city have expanded into the hills without a directed urban planning framework aligned with environmental considerations, leading to geophysical characteristics that cause landslides during the rainy season. In some areas, the lack of green spaces hinders rainwater drainage, resulting in flooding and inundations.

Situated within the Atlantic Forest biome, much of the municipality’s original vegetation was cleared in the 1930s with the establishment of the Companhia Siderúrgica Belgo-Mineira. To mitigate environmental impacts and prevent potential environmental stress, the company initiated a reforestation program in the 1940s. Currently, various projects are ongoing or planned, including the annual Week of the Environment, held between late May and early June, which features lectures in schools and for the public, ecological walks, and tree planting across the city.

=== Climate ===
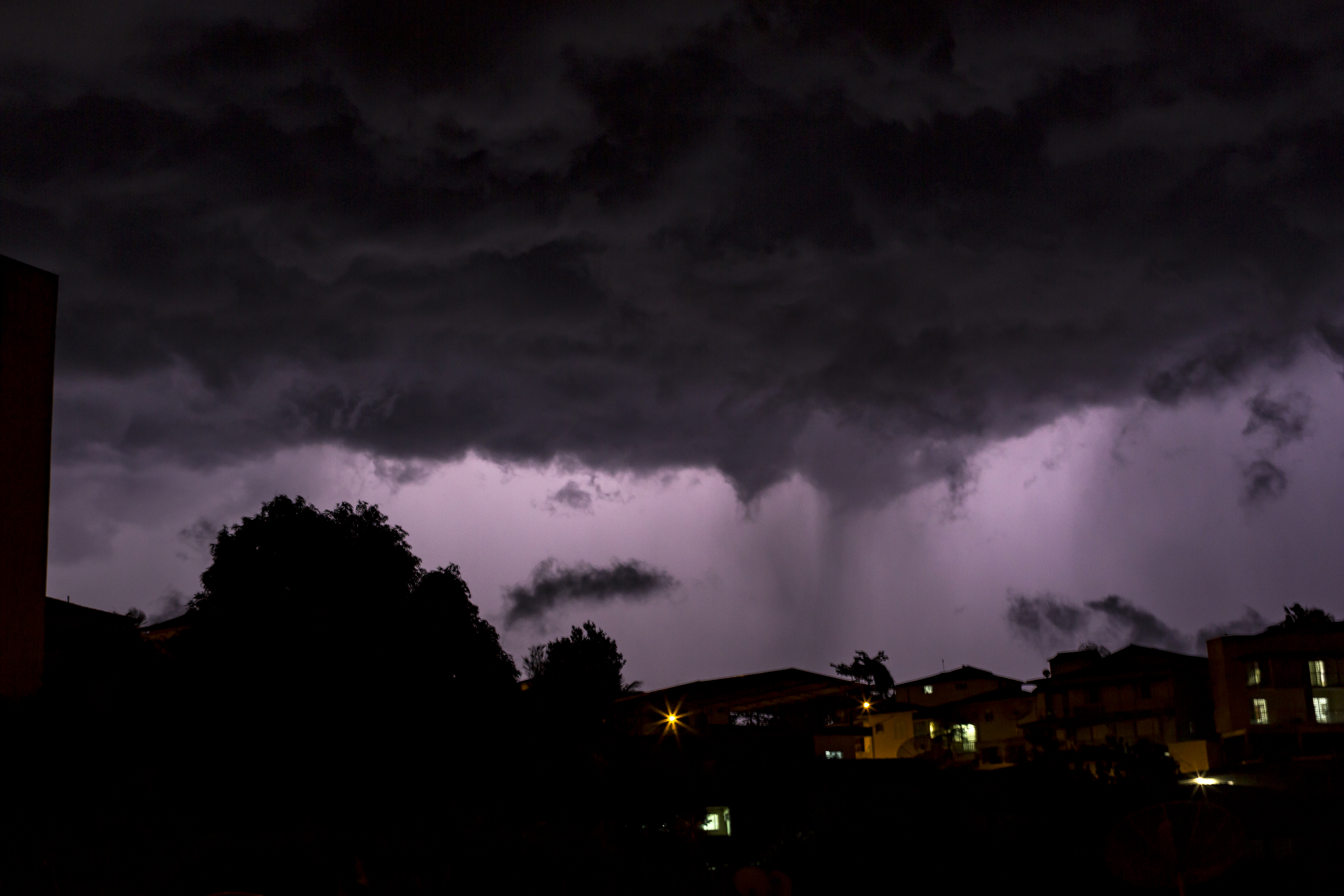
Storm with lightning in the city on a November night.

The climate in João Monlevade is classified as humid subtropical (type Cwa according to the Köppen classification), with an average annual temperature of 21 °C and an average annual rainfall of 1,400 mm, concentrated between October and April, with December being the wettest month. The wet season corresponds to the warmer months, while the dry season includes milder months. February, the warmest month, has an average temperature of 23.4 °C, while July, the coldest month, averages 17.7 °C. Extreme cold events are rare during winter, with autumn and spring serving as transitional seasons.

With nearly 1,970 hours of insolation annually, the relative humidity is relatively high, with an annual average above 75%. Fog occurs in the mornings of colder months due to high humidity and lower temperatures. However, low humidity levels can occur during the dry season or prolonged Indian summers. During these periods, dry air combined with pollution from vehicles, industries, and wildfires contributes to increased atmospheric pollutant concentration, worsening air quality. The prevailing wind comes from the east, with the windiest period from 3 August to 28 November, averaging 11.3 kilometers per hour, with a slight peak in September and October. During the calmer period from March to June, the average wind speed ranges between 9 and 10 kilometers per hour.

Highest 24-hour precipitation accumulations recorded in João Monlevade by month (INMET)
| Month | Accumulation | Date | Month | Accumulation | Date |
|---|---|---|---|---|---|
| January | 145.2 mm | 04/01/1997 | July | 35.9 mm | 04/07/1976 |
| February | 111 mm | 17/02/1998 | August | 55.8 mm | 31/08/2008 |
| March | 91.2 mm | 01/03/1997 | September | 57 mm | 29/09/1989 |
| April | 64.3 mm | 29/04/2016 | October | 93.5 mm | 31/10/1965 |
| May | 71 mm | 30/05/1979 | November | 103 mm | 10/11/2009 |
| June | 56 mm | 26/06/1989 | December | 115.2 mm | 20/12/2011 |
Period: 01/01/1961 to 31/12/1984, 01/01/1986 to 31/10/1991, 01/04/1993 to 31/12/2002, 01/01/2004 to 30/06/2018

According to data from the National Institute of Meteorology (INMET) for the periods 1961–1984, 1986–1991 (until 31 October), 1993 (from 1 April) to 2002, and 2004–2018, the lowest temperature recorded in João Monlevade was 3.5 °C on 1 June 1979, and the highest reached 37.8 °C on 10 September 1997. The highest 24-hour precipitation accumulation was 145.2 mm on 4 January 1997. Other accumulations equal to or exceeding 100 mm include 115.2 mm on 20 December 2011, 111 mm on 17 February 1998, 105.2 mm on 27 January 1961, 103.9 mm on 21 February 1964, 103 mm on 10 November 2009, and 100.3 mm on 23 January 1977. December 2011, with 616 mm, was the wettest month on record.

Rainfall, particularly during the wet season, may be accompanied by lightnings, gusty winds, and occasionally hail, with a recorded event on 15 September 2008. According to the National Institute for Space Research (INPE), João Monlevade ranks 65th in the incidence of lightning strikes in Minas Gerais, with an average of 11.4865 strikes per square kilometer annually.

Climate data for João Monlevade
| Month | Jan | Feb | Mar | Apr | May | Jun | Jul | Aug | Sep | Oct | Nov | Dec | Year |
|---|---|---|---|---|---|---|---|---|---|---|---|---|---|
| Record high °C (°F) | 35.2 (95.4) | 36.3 (97.3) | 33.7 (92.7) | 32.5 (90.5) | 32.6 (90.7) | 31.7 (89.1) | 32.5 (90.5) | 34.8 (94.6) | 37.8 (100.0) | 37.5 (99.5) | 36.3 (97.3) | 34.8 (94.6) | 37.8 (100.0) |
| Mean daily maximum °C (°F) | 28.5 (83.3) | 29.3 (84.7) | 28.2 (82.8) | 26.9 (80.4) | 25.2 (77.4) | 24.0 (75.2) | 24.1 (75.4) | 24.9 (76.8) | 25.9 (78.6) | 27.1 (80.8) | 27.0 (80.6) | 27.2 (81.0) | 26.5 (79.7) |
| Daily mean °C (°F) | 23.1 (73.6) | 23.4 (74.1) | 22.6 (72.7) | 21.3 (70.3) | 19.4 (66.9) | 17.9 (64.2) | 17.7 (63.9) | 18.4 (65.1) | 19.7 (67.5) | 21.1 (70.0) | 21.7 (71.1) | 22.1 (71.8) | 20.7 (69.3) |
| Mean daily minimum °C (°F) | 19.1 (66.4) | 19.2 (66.6) | 18.8 (65.8) | 17.4 (63.3) | 15.3 (59.5) | 13.8 (56.8) | 13.4 (56.1) | 14.0 (57.2) | 15.5 (59.9) | 17.0 (62.6) | 17.9 (64.2) | 18.5 (65.3) | 16.7 (62.1) |
| Record low °C (°F) | 12.7 (54.9) | 12.0 (53.6) | 11.7 (53.1) | 9.2 (48.6) | 6.4 (43.5) | 3.5 (38.3) | 5.7 (42.3) | 6.4 (43.5) | 8.3 (46.9) | 9.6 (49.3) | 10.0 (50.0) | 11.4 (52.5) | 3.5 (38.3) |
| Average precipitation mm (inches) | 232.8 (9.17) | 125.9 (4.96) | 193.1 (7.60) | 68.5 (2.70) | 29.2 (1.15) | 14.1 (0.56) | 6.3 (0.25) | 13.7 (0.54) | 43.0 (1.69) | 97.8 (3.85) | 250.2 (9.85) | 326.7 (12.86) | 1,401.3 (55.17) |
| Average precipitation days | 13 | 9 | 11 | 6 | 4 | 2 | 1 | 2 | 4 | 8 | 15 | 18 | 93 |
| Average relative humidity (%) | 78.9 | 76.0 | 79.5 | 78.8 | 78.6 | 77.2 | 73.8 | 72.1 | 73.0 | 74.9 | 78.9 | 81.5 | 76.9 |
| Mean monthly sunshine hours | 166.6 | 169.8 | 164.6 | 177.4 | 177.3 | 187.0 | 197.6 | 197.2 | 141.4 | 140.3 | 129.5 | 118.4 | 1,967.1 |
Source: National Institute of Meteorology (INMET) (1981–2010 climatological normal; temperature records: 01/01/1961 to 31/12/1984, 01/01/1986 to 31/10/1991, 01/04/1993 to 31/12/2002, and 01/01/2004 to 30/06/2018)

== Demography ==
Population growth of João Monlevade

| Year | Population |
|---|---|
| 1970 | 39,988 |
| 1980 | 48,198 |
| 1991 | 59,340 |
| 2000 | 66,690 |
| 2010 | 73,120 |
| Est. 2018 | 79,387 |

In 2010, the population of the municipality was recorded by the Brazilian Institute of Geography and Statistics (IBGE) as 73,120 inhabitants, making it the 47th most populous in the state, with a population density of 739.81 inhabitants per km². That year, 34,963 inhabitants were male, and 38,488 were female. According to the same census, 73,120 inhabitants lived in the urban area, while 331 resided in the rural area. The population was composed of 28,170 whites (38.27%), 9,939 blacks (13.50%), 663 Asians (0.90%), 34,764 mixed-race (47.23%), and 74 indigenous people (0.10%). According to 2018 statistics, the municipal population was 79,387 inhabitants.

The Human Development Index (HDI) of João Monlevade is considered high by the United Nations Development Programme (UNDP), with a value of 0.807, ranking as the 28th highest in Minas Gerais (out of 853 municipalities) and 425th nationally (out of 5,507). The city’s indicators are generally average and comparable to the national average according to the UNDP. The Gini coefficient, which measures social inequality, is 0.38, where 1.00 is the worst and 0.00 is the best. In 2003, the incidence of poverty, as measured by the IBGE, was 23.68%, with a lower limit of 14.12%, an upper limit of 33.25%, and a subjective poverty incidence of 18.07%.

=== Religion ===
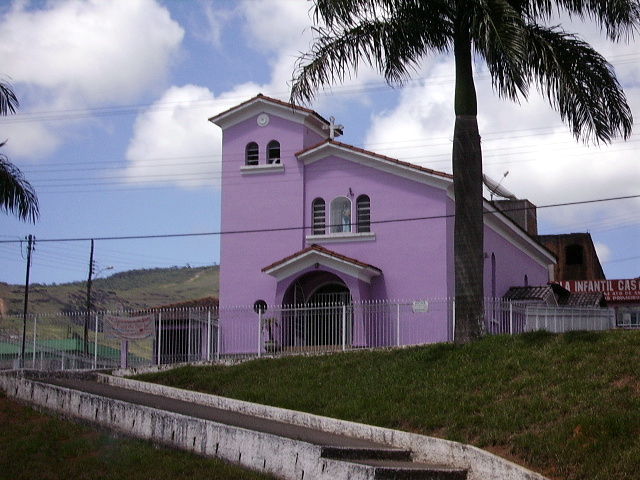
Church of Louis-Marie Grignion de Montfort. Catholicism is the predominant religion in the municipality, as it is throughout Brazil.

Reflecting the cultural diversity of João Monlevade, the city is home to a variety of religious expressions. While it developed primarily within a Catholic social framework, numerous Protestant denominations are present today.

Located in the country with the largest Catholic population in absolute numbers, João Monlevade has four parishes (Our Lady of the Immaculate Conception, Our Lady of Fatima, São José Operário, and São Luís Maria de Montfort) and is part of the Diocese of Itabira-Fabriciano. The Catholic Church had its legal status recognized by the federal government in October 2009, despite Brazil being an officially secular state.

The city is home to various Protestant or reformed denominations, including the Assembly of God, Maranatha Christian Church, Presbyterian Church, Baptist churches, the Seventh-day Adventist Church, and the Universal Church of the Kingdom of God, among others. According to the 2000 IBGE census, the population of João Monlevade consists of Catholics (82.26%), evangelicals (12.53%), people with no religion (3.69%), Spiritists (0.52%), Umbandists (0.06%), and 0.94% belonging to other religions.

== Politics ==
Municipal administration is carried out by the executive branch and the legislative branch. The first leader of the executive branch and mayor of the municipality was Wilson Alvarenga, elected in December 1965, just over a year after the city’s emancipation. Over twenty-nine terms, various mayors have served João Monlevade. In 2009, Gustavo Prandini of the Green Party (PV) won the municipal elections in João Monlevade with 37.94% of the valid votes. As the municipality had fewer than 200,000 voters, there was no second round.

The legislative branch consists of the municipal chamber, composed of ten councilors elected for four-year terms (in accordance with Article 29 of the Constitution) and is structured as follows: two seats for the Workers' Party (PT), two for the National Mobilization Party (PMN), two for the Brazilian Social Democracy Party (PSDB), one for the Green Party (PV), one for the Brazilian Democratic Movement Party (PMDB), one for the Progressive Party (PP), and one for the Republic Party (PR). The chamber is responsible for drafting and voting on laws fundamental to the administration and the executive, particularly the participatory budget (Budget Guidelines Law).

The municipality of João Monlevade is governed by an organic law and serves as the seat of a Judicial District, with, according to the prefecture, a sister city, Bela Vista de Minas. In 2010, the municipality had 56,795 voters, a 2.74% increase compared to 2008.

== Subdivisions ==
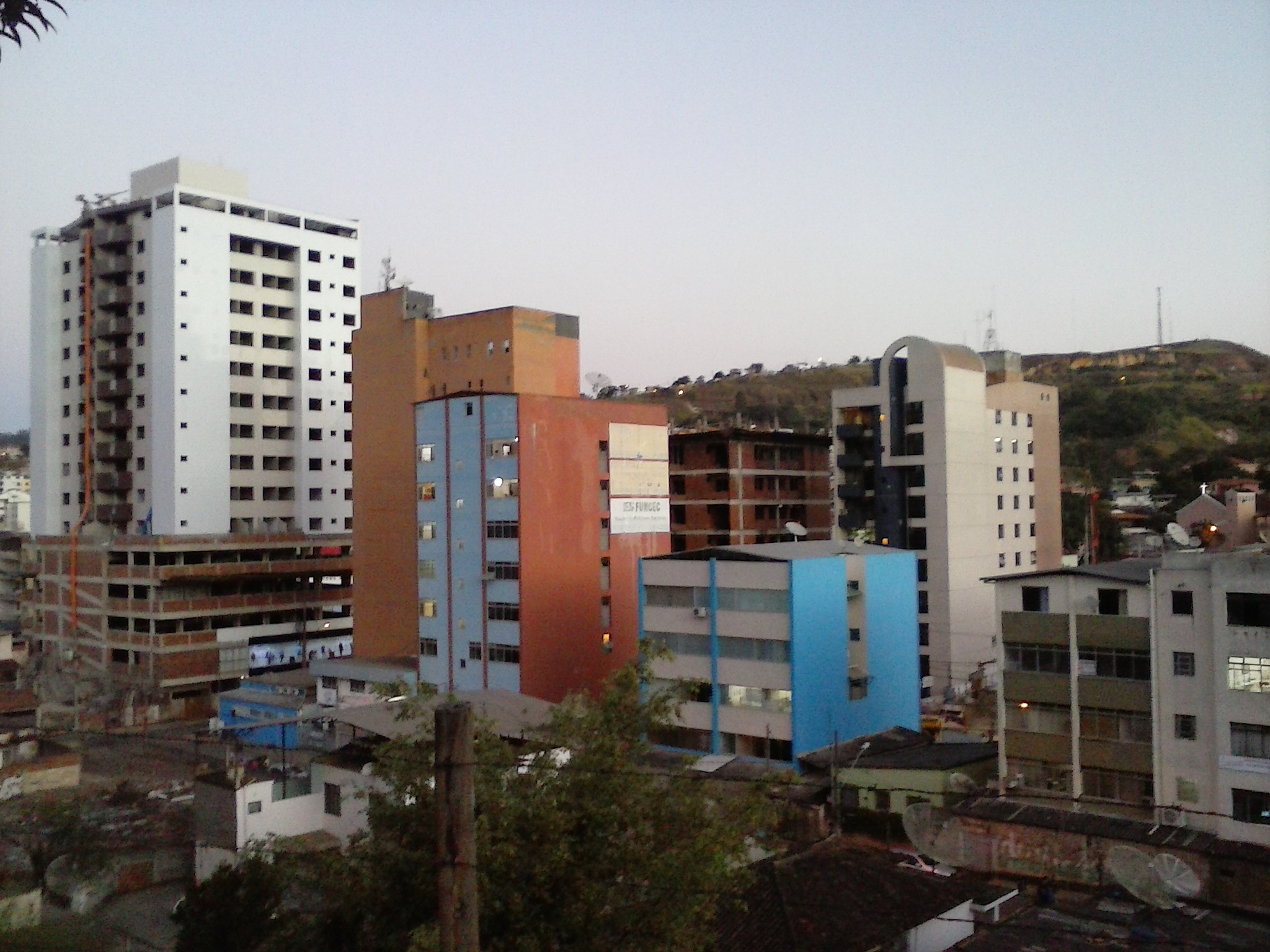
Carneirinhos neighborhood, central region of João Monlevade.

The municipality has no subdivisions into districts other than the District Seat, and according to the IBGE, there have never been legislative proposals to formalize the creation of additional districts. However, the city is informally divided into three regions: the Industrial City, encompassing neighborhoods between the Baú Cemetery and the border with Bela Vista de Minas, including the areas around Baú, Vila Tanque, and Centro Industrial; Carneirinhos, covering the lands from Getúlio Vargas and Wilson Alvarenga avenues to the borders with São Gonçalo do Rio Abaixo and the vicinity of BR-381; and Loanda/Cruzeiro Celeste, which includes neighborhoods along BR-381 and Armando Fajardo and Isaac Cassimiro avenues. At the time of emancipation, there was an unofficial division into two regions: Monlevade, comprising the central blocks of the city and the ArcelorMittal plant and its surroundings, and Carneirinhos, which included the rest of the urban perimeter.

Due to the higher population concentration, smaller official groupings exist today. According to the "Grande Brasil" website, João Monlevade comprises 64 neighborhoods, in addition to subdivisions and residential condominiums. In some neighborhoods, street names are themed after the locality, such as in the República neighborhood, where streets are named after former Brazilian presidents, and in the Satélite neighborhood, where streets are named after Northeastern Brazilian capitals.

== Economy ==
The Gross Domestic Product (GDP) of João Monlevade is the second largest in its microregion, with a focus on the service sector. According to 2008 data from the IBGE, the municipality’s GDP was R$ 1,436,358.435. Of this, 181,233 thousand were from taxes on products net of subsidies at current prices. The per capita GDP was R$ 19,260.33.

In 2009, there were 35,021 workers, of which 19,272 were employed, and 15,749 were salaried employees. Wages and other remunerations totaled 232,025 reais, with an average monthly salary of 2.6 minimum wages across the municipality. There were 2,728 local units and 2,654 active companies.

Production of sugarcane, corn, and cassava
| Product | Harvested Area (hectares) | Production (tons) |
|---|---|---|
| Sugarcane | 8 | 480 |
| Cassava | 3 | 36 |
| Corn | 12 | 36 |

Agriculture is the least significant sector for João Monlevade’s economy. According to the IBGE, in 2009, the municipality had a herd of 1,983 cattle, 70 horses, four donkeys, 20 mules, 120 pigs, 40 goats, 20 sheep, and 1,350 poultry, including 500 hens and 850 roosters, chicks, and pullets. In 2009, the city produced 281,000 liters of milk from 240 cows, 4,000 dozen eggs, and 750,000 kilograms of honey. In terms of temporary agriculture, the main crops are sugarcane (480 tons), cassava (36 tons), and corn (36 tons).

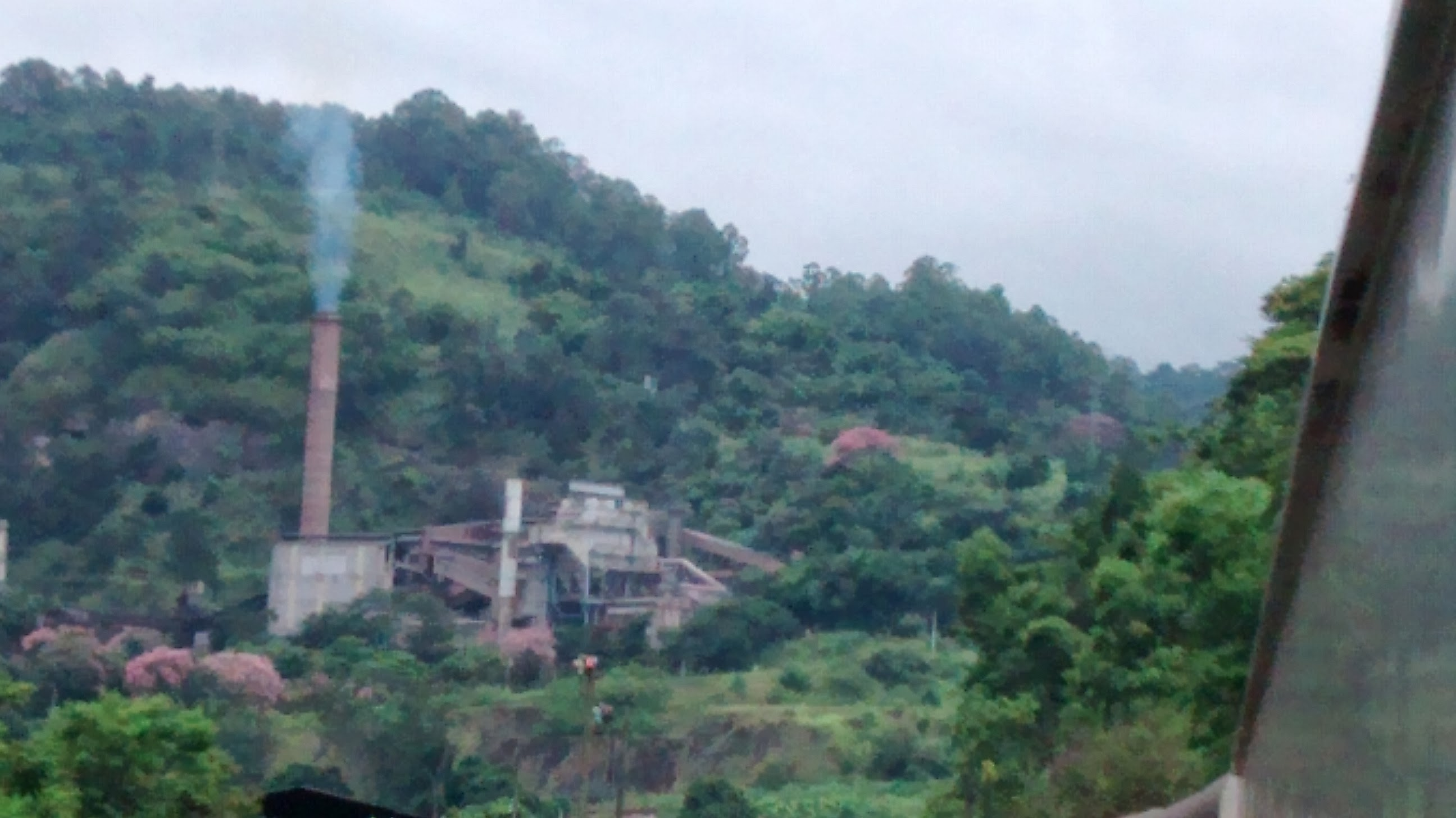
View of some buildings of Belgo, a company founded in the 1930s that was vital to Monlevade’s growth.

In the industry sector, the primary source of income is ArcelorMittal Aços Longos, part of the world’s largest steelmaking group. This sector was crucial to the emergence and development of the municipality and its surroundings. João Monlevade also has around 2,500 small industries and service providers, contributing to the municipality’s growth, particularly in forging, service provision, locksmithing, machining, boilermaking, and civil construction. In 2000, 7,254 people were employed in the industrial sector.

The commerce of João Monlevade is concentrated in the Carneirinhos neighborhood, away from the Belgo plant, although smaller commercial hubs exist in neighborhoods such as Loanda and Cruzeiro Celeste. Most of the city’s commerce revolves around clothing and footwear, but there is also significant activity in services, electronics, automobiles, and supermarkets. As a regional hub due to its diverse commerce, João Monlevade is home to major national retail chains such as Ricardo Eletro, Magazine Luiza, and Ponto Frio.

== Infrastructure ==
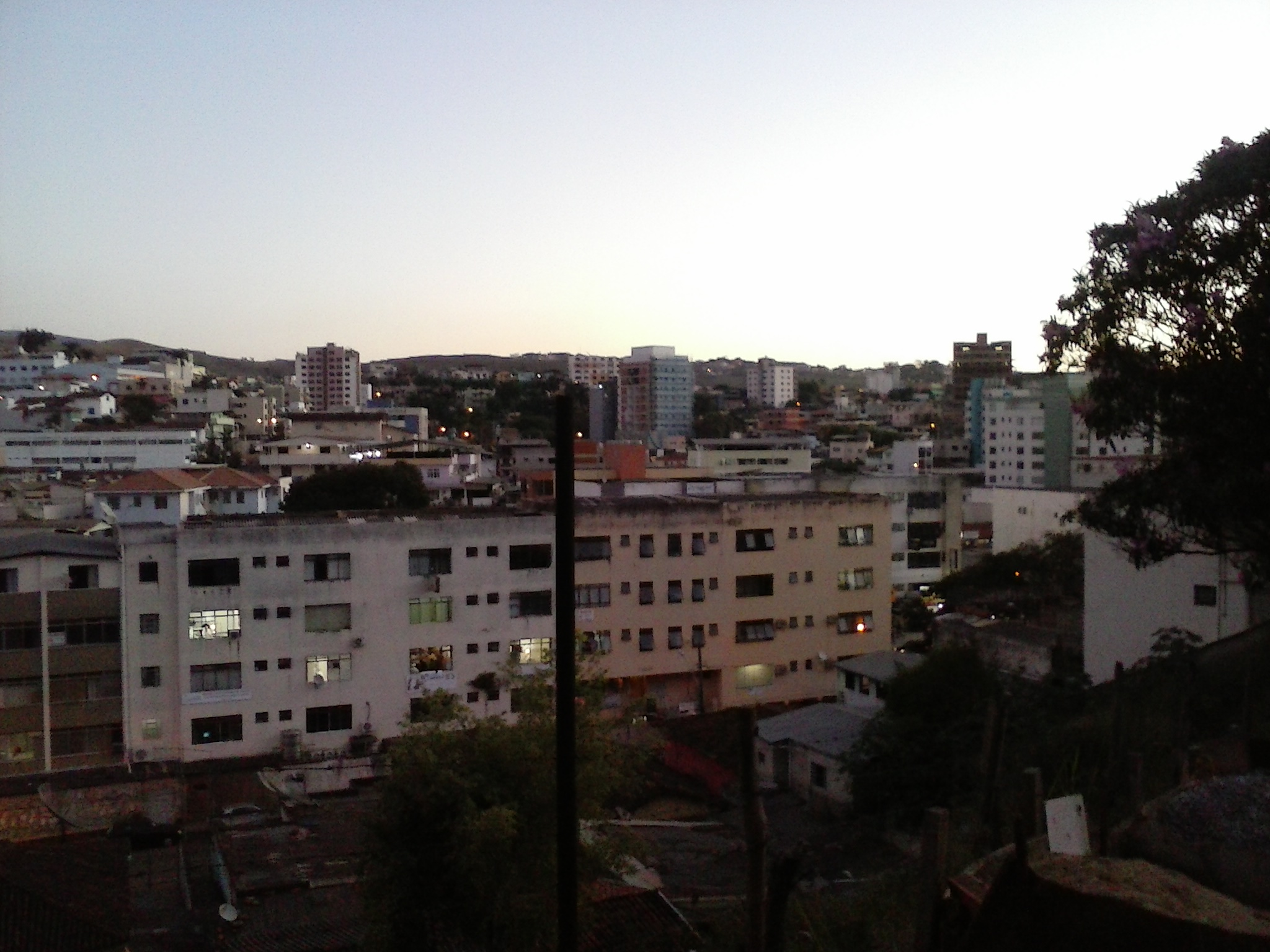
Partial view of the central region of João Monlevade

In 2000, the municipality had 17,357 housing units, including apartments, houses, and rooms. Of these, 13,341 were owned properties, with 12,619 fully paid (72.70%), 722 under acquisition (4.16%), and 2,752 rented (15.86%); 1,142 properties were provided, with 94 by employers (0.54%) and 1,048 provided otherwise (6.04%). Another 122 were occupied in other ways (0.70%). The municipality has access to treated water, electricity, sewage, urban cleaning, landline telephony, and mobile telephony. In 2000, 96.83% of households were served by the general water supply network; 92.88% had garbage collected by the cleaning service; and 92.82% had access to the general sewage or stormwater network.

=== Healthcare ===
In 2009, the municipality had 54 healthcare facilities, including hospitals, emergency rooms, health centers, and dental services, with 17 public and 37 private facilities, all public ones belonging to the municipal network. These facilities provided 102 beds for hospitalization, all in private institutions. In 2010, 1,010 live births were recorded, and 123 deaths were recorded, with 72 males and 51 females.

The main hospitals in the municipality are Unimed João Monlevade and Margarida Hospital. The latter stands out as one of the city’s first hospitals, inaugurated by Companhia Siderúrgica Belgo-Mineira on 16 November 1952 to meet the growing demand driven by the city’s development. Prior to this, medical care was provided in a temporary wooden clinic within the plant. Located in the Vila Tanque neighborhood, it is also one of Monlevade’s main structures.

=== Education ===
The Basic Education Development Index (IDEB) average for public schools in João Monlevade in 2009 was 5.4, above the national average for municipal and state schools, which was 4.0%. In 2009, the municipality had approximately 15,151 enrollments and 54 schools in the public and private networks.

Education in João Monlevade stands out as one of the best in Minas Gerais, with the municipal Education Department reporting one of the top 10 IDEB (Basic Education Development Index) rates in the state (with above-average scores) and among the top 50 in the country. This achievement is based on both public and private schools, in addition to four institutions offering higher education in the city: the Federal University of Ouro Preto (UFOP), the Minas Gerais State University (UEMG), and the João Monlevade Educational Center (CEJM).

According to data from the Anísio Teixeira National Institute for Educational Studies and Research (INEP) and the Ministry of Education (MEC), the illiteracy rate in 2000 among individuals aged 18 to 24 was 1.590%. The gross school attendance rate in that year was 83.660%, compared to a national rate of 81.5%. A total of 1,295 inhabitants had less than one year of schooling or no education at all. In 2010, 52 students were enrolled in special education programs, and 177 children attended daycare centers, with 25 daycare students and 77 elementary school students participating in full-time education.

Education in João Monlevade in numbers
| Level | Enrollments | Teachers | Schools (total) |
|---|---|---|---|
| Early childhood education | 1,289 | 78 | 17 |
| Primary education | 10,687 | 590 | 28 |
| Secondary education | 3,175 | 199 | 9 |

== Public safety and crime ==
As in most medium and large Brazilian municipalities, crime remains a challenge in João Monlevade. In 2008, the homicide rate in the municipality was 24.1 per 100,000 inhabitants, ranking 43rd in the state and 699th nationally. The suicide rate in that year was 5.4 per 100,000 inhabitants, placing it 161st in the state and 1106th nationally. Regarding deaths from traffic accidents, the rate was 17.4 per 100,000 inhabitants, ranking 149th in the state and 1324th nationally.

However, these rates are relatively low compared to other Brazilian cities and to previous years. The 17th Independent Company of the Minas Gerais Military Police (PMMG), headquartered in the municipality, is responsible for policing and combating crime in João Monlevade and Bela Vista de Minas. According to the battalion, there was a 14.66% decrease in the crime rate from 2009 to 2010. According to the PM, the most violent areas in Monlevade are the Novo Cruzeiro and Nova Monlevade neighborhoods.

== Services and communications ==
The water supply service is managed by the Department of Water and Sewage (DAE), which is also responsible for sewage collection. In the municipality, as in most of Minas Gerais, electricity supply is provided by the Minas Gerais Energy Company (Cemig). In 2003, there were 23,224 consumers, and 358,274,340 kWh of energy was consumed.

Dial-up and broadband (ADSL) internet services are offered by various free and paid providers. Mobile phone services are provided by several operators. The area code (DDD) for Monlevade is 031. The Postal Code (CEP) for the city ranges from 35930-000 to 35931-999. On 19 January 2009, the city began offering number portability, along with other cities with the 031 area code. This service allows users to switch operators without changing their phone numbers.

The municipality also has several newspapers in circulation. In 2000, there were three in total. Currently, the regularly circulated newspapers include A Notícia (since 1984), Bom Dia (since 1998), O Popular (since 2003), O Celeste, Alô Cidadão, Diário do Vale, and Última Notícia (since 2013). In 2001, there were two radio stations, according to the Minas Gerais Radio and TV Association and Minas Gerais Telecommunications. However, this number has increased over the years. The main radio stations in the city are Rádio Cultura, broadcasting since 1961 as the first station in Monlevade, and Rádio Alternativa 1 FM. There are also several television stations broadcasting in both UHF and VHF, including local stations such as TV Leste and TV Globo Minas.

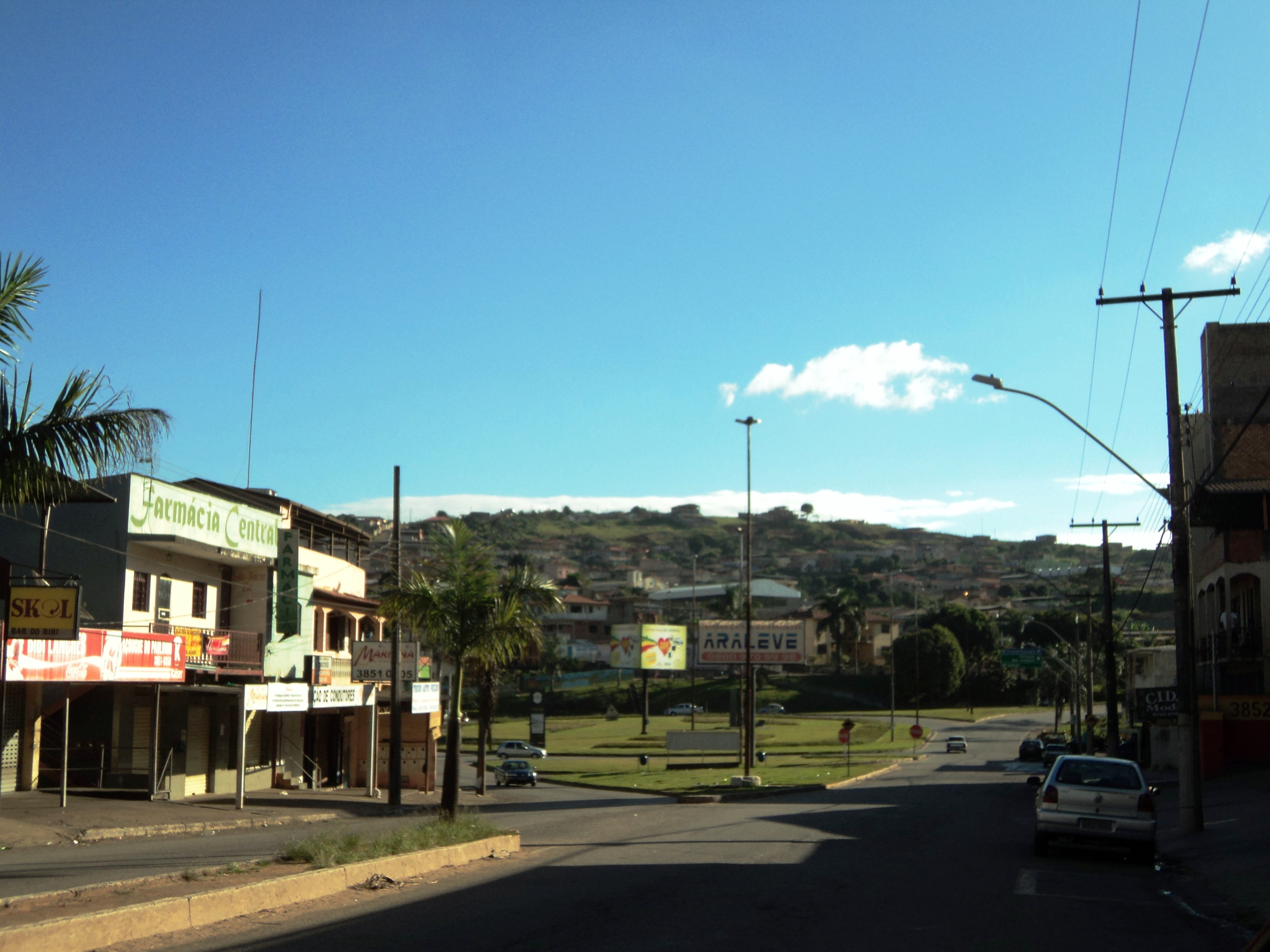
Intersection between Armando Fajardo Avenue and BR-381

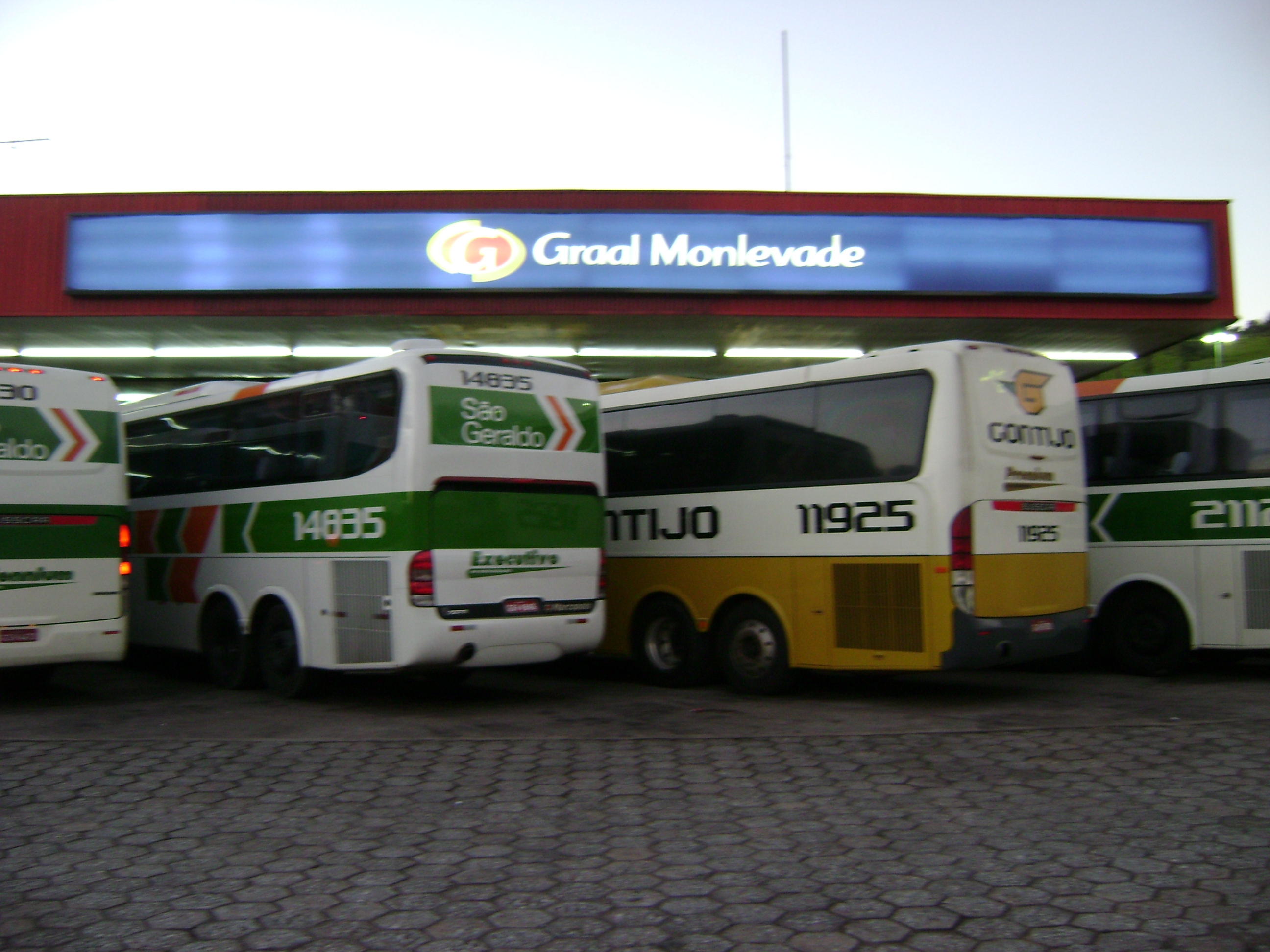
View of the bus terminal inaugurated in 2004, the only one in the city.

== Transportation ==
The municipal vehicle fleet in 2010 consisted of 28,023 vehicles, including 18,019 cars, 1,038 trucks, 226 tractor-trucks, 2,744 pickups, 544 scooters, 93 minibuses, 4,317 motorcycles, 197 mopeds, 216 buses, three wheeled tractors, 61 utility vehicles, and 565 other types. The city's duplicated and paved avenues and numerous traffic lights facilitate traffic flow, but the increase in the number of vehicles over the past decade has led to increasingly slow traffic, particularly in the city center. Additionally, finding parking spaces in the commercial center has become challenging, causing some losses to local businesses.

The João Monlevade Traffic and Transit Department is responsible for regulating and overseeing the public transportation system, managing traffic, and, through its Traffic Agents, issuing fines to drivers who commit traffic violations. Public transportation is operated by Escon Viação. A project is currently under consideration to create a dedicated bus lane, known as the "Blue Line," on the city's main avenues.

João Monlevade is served by the Vitória-Minas Railway (EFVM), which provides daily passenger rail transport and logistics services for mining operations in neighboring cities. The city's station was inaugurated on 31 August 1935, and the EFVM remains the cheapest and safest way to travel to Belo Horizonte, Vitória, or other cities with stations or stops. By road, the municipality has easy access to BR-381, connecting to cities such as São Paulo, Belo Horizonte, and Governador Valadares; to BR-262, linking to Corumbá, Campo Grande, Uberlândia, Belo Horizonte, and Vitória; and to MG-129, serving nearby municipalities such as Itabira, Rio Piracicaba, Mariana, Ouro Preto, and Conselheiro Lafaiete.

The municipality also has a bus terminal, one of the largest and busiest in the region. The João Monlevade Bus Terminal, located on the outskirts of BR-381 in the Santo Hipólito neighborhood, is managed by Rede Graal. It was inaugurated in February 2004 to replace the old Tancredo Neves Bus Terminal, which closed on 20 February of that year.

== Culture ==
The cultural sector in João Monlevade is managed by the Department of Sports and Leisure and the House of Culture Foundation, which aim to plan and implement the municipality's cultural policy through programs, projects, and activities that promote cultural development. These entities are linked to the Mayor's Office, form part of the municipality's indirect public administration, and have administrative and financial autonomy, supported by budget allocations, their own assets, revenue application, and contracts or agreements with other institutions.

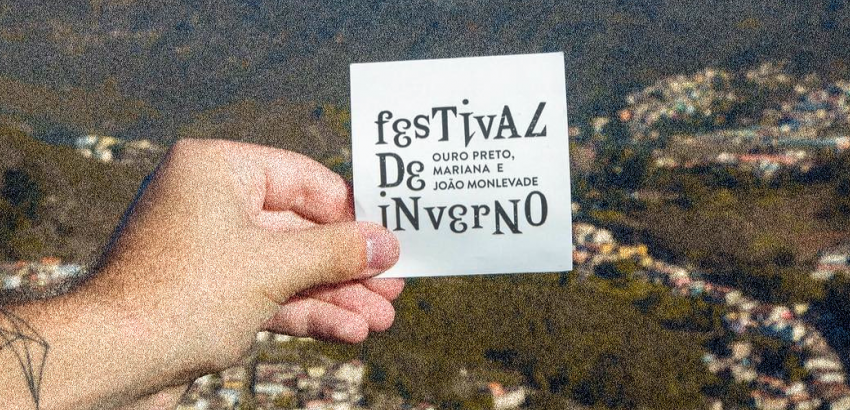
Logo of the UFOP Winter Festival, which also takes place in Monlevade

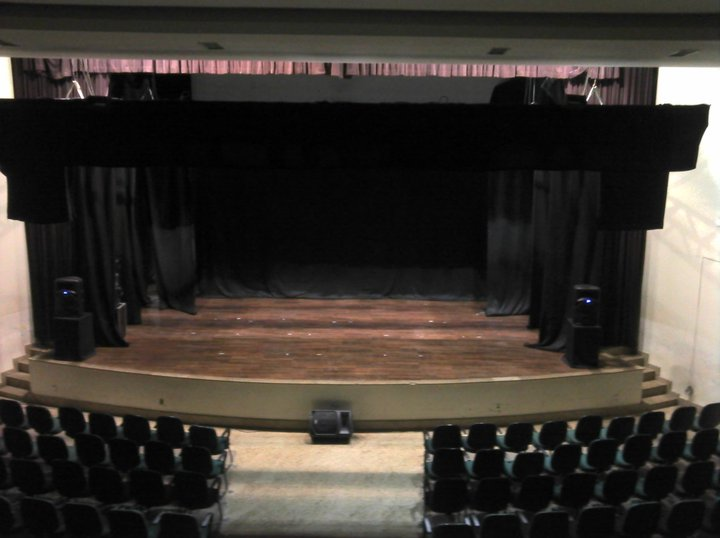
Amphitheater of the João Monlevade Educational Center

Throughout the year, various performances take place at the CEJM amphitheater and in public spaces. There are two active theater companies: Cia. Teatral O Salto and Cia. do Infinito de Teatro. These groups frequently perform shows in the city and have represented Monlevade in other cities across the state. Since October 2011, Cia. Teatral O Salto has been running the Domingo na Praça Cultural Project, which brings theatrical performances to city squares to decentralize and promote theater culture. Since its inception, the project has visited 10 different squares, attracting thousands of spectators. Alongside this growth in the local scene, the need for a cultural association emerged. In August 2011, the Acordar Cultural Association of Médio Piracicaba was established, encompassing various artistic disciplines, including theater, music, lyrical arts, and visual arts. In 2011, the city hosted the 1st Performing Arts Festival, featuring local, regional, and national artists from Minas Gerais and other Brazilian states.

The ArcelorMittal Cultural Program, promoted by ArcelorMittal João Monlevade, also organizes theatrical performances for the public.

Handicrafts are another form of spontaneous cultural expression in Monlevade. Throughout the municipality, unique artisanal products are made using regional raw materials, reflecting local culture and lifestyles. Groups such as the João Monlevade Artisans Association (Artejom) bring together various artisans, providing spaces for the creation, exhibition, and sale of handmade products. These items are typically sold at fairs, exhibitions, or craft shops. The craft fair at Praça do Povo and Praça 7, held since 2003, is a notable event in the city.

== Tourism and events ==
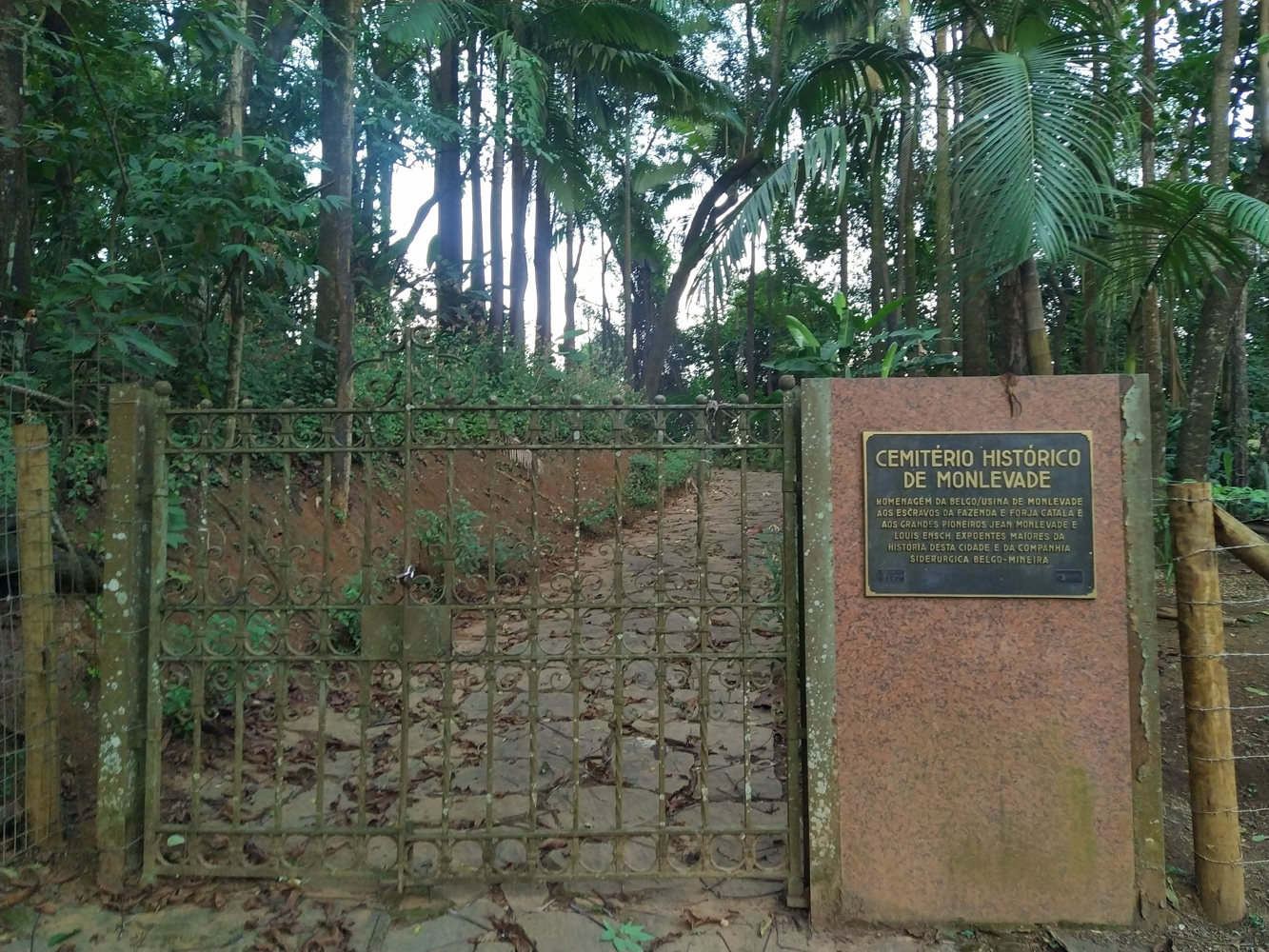
Facade of the Historical Cemetery

João Monlevade boasts several tourist attractions, including the Serra do Seara, the highest point in the municipality, which offers a runway for hang gliding and serves as an important ecological and environmental reserve.

The Henry Meyers Forest Club hosts dances, parties, environmental visits by organizations, and sports activities such as rappelling and ecological tours, within a 100,000 m² green area. The Areão Municipal Park, the city’s exhibition park, has accommodated over 25,000 people and includes a small environmental reserve known for its trails.

The Catalan Forge, built by Jean-Antoine Félix Dissandes de Monlevade in the 1910s to settle in the region, and the Historical Cemetery, constructed in the 19th century for the burial of slaves who worked at the Catalan Forge, are also notable. The São José do Operário Parish Church, founded on 25 September 1948, honors the workers of the Belgo-Mineira Steel Company (now ArcelorMittal). It is the only church in the world built in a "V" shape, resembling a chalice, to celebrate the Allied victory in World War II. In front of the church, there is a statue of a bishop with hands forming a "V." The external staircase leading to the church is also chalice-shaped. Additionally, a grotto dedicated to Our Lady of Lourdes is part of the surroundings. The Fazenda Solar Monlevade, owned by Jean Antoine Félix Dissandes de Monlevade, was built in the early 19th century by slaves. This imposing structure dominated the Piracicaba Valley landscape and remains a historical landmark and symbol of the civilization established by the French pioneer.

To promote local socioeconomic development, the João Monlevade city government, sometimes in partnership with local companies, invests in festivals and events. These events often attract visitors from other cities, requiring improved infrastructure and encouraging the professionalization of the sector, benefiting both tourists and the local population. Activities occur throughout the year, including the Monlevade Carnival in February; celebrations of the city’s emancipation anniversary in April; Labor Day in May; Quadrilha dances in June or July; the Monlevade Cavalcade in August; and Christmas festivities in December.

== Sports ==
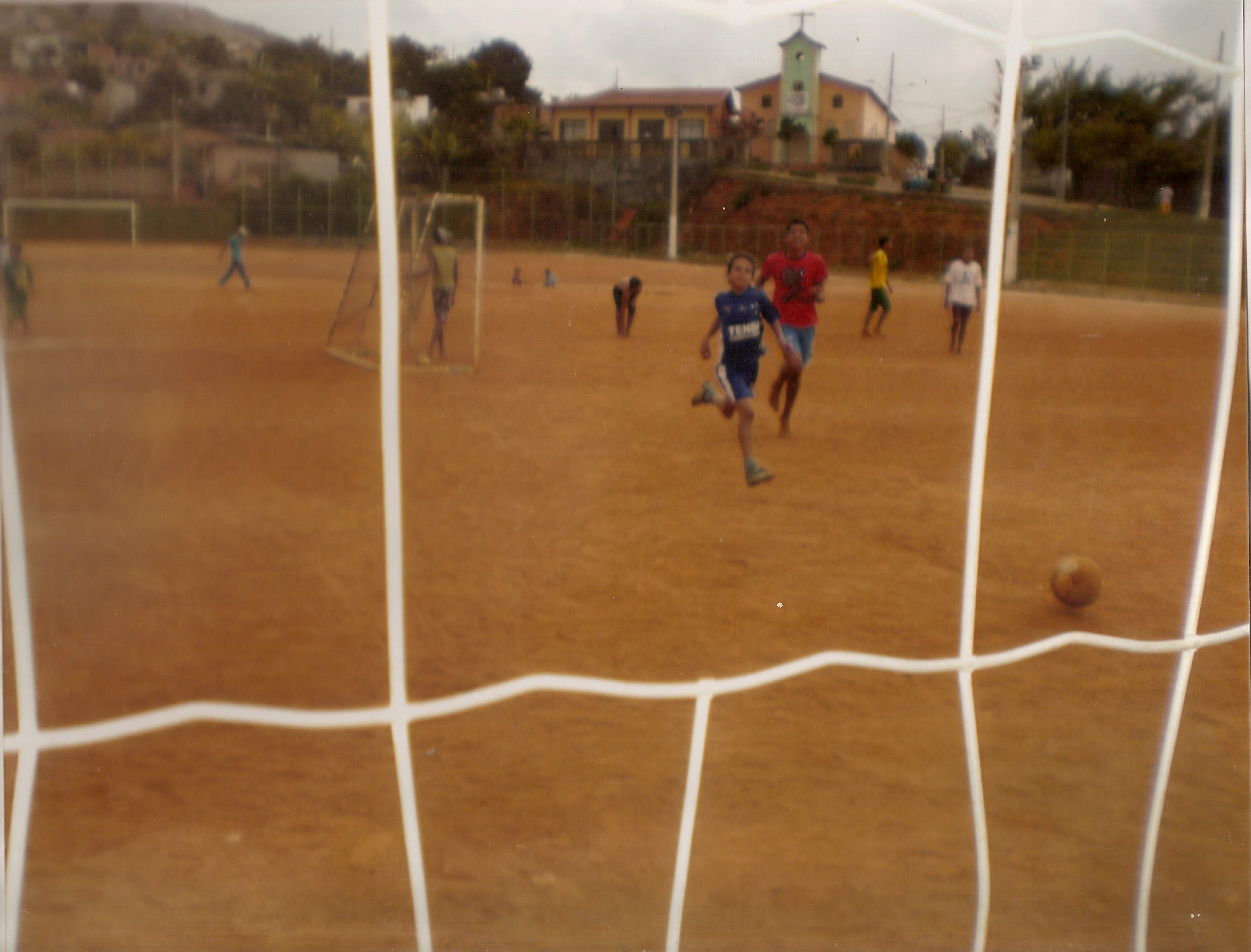
Football is the most popular sport in Brazil. The image shows children playing football in a local field. The first clubs in Monlevade emerged in the 1940s, and categories for children were established in the 1970s.

As in much of Brazil, football is the most popular sport in João Monlevade. The city is home to several clubs, such as Real Esporte Clube, founded on 7 September 1957, initially as a football team. In 1977, it became a social and recreational club, and in 1983, the Domingos Silvério Sobrinho Sports Center was established, featuring a football field, badminton courts, swimming pools, gym rooms, and a physiotherapy clinic. Other well-known sports facilities include the Embaúbas Tennis Club and the Arena Esportiva.

The Monlevadense Football League (LMF) is the institution responsible for professionalizing and regulating football championships in the city. Among these, the Monlevadense Football Championship stands out, held annually and involving the city’s main teams. The Louis Ensch Municipal Stadium is the main venue for sports activities in the city, with a capacity of approximately 1,900 spectators.

== Holidays ==
João Monlevade has three municipal holidays and eight national holidays, in addition to optional holidays. The municipal holidays are: the city’s emancipation anniversary on 29 April; Corpus Christi, held on the Thursday following the Sunday of the Holy Trinity; and the day of Our Lady of the Conception on 8 December. According to federal law No. 9,093, enacted on 12 September 1995, municipalities may have up to four municipal holidays, including Good Friday.

== See also ==
- List of municipalities in Minas Gerais

== Bibliography ==
- Souza, Jairo Martins de (2008). Dossiê Monlevade - O Processo do Bazar. João Monlevade: Grafer Editora.
- Souza, Jairo Martins de (2009). Jean Monlevade - do Castelo à Forja. João Monlevade: Grafer Editora.
