= Piabucus caudomaculatus =

Conservation status
- Least Concern (IUCN 3.1)

Scientific classification
- Kingdom: Animalia
- Phylum: Chordata
- Class: Actinopterygii
- Order: Characiformes
- Family: Iguanodectidae
- Genus: Piabucus
- Species: P. caudomaculatus

Binomial name
- Piabucus caudomaculatus Vari, 1977

Species of fish

Piabucus caudomaculatus is a species of freshwater ray-finned fish belonging to the family Iguanodectidae. This species is endemic to Bolivia, where it is found solely in the Mamoré river basin. It displays a preference for slow-moving waterways and has a largely insectivorous diet.

== Description ==
Piabucus caudomaculatus reaches a maximum of 9.6 cm (3.8 in) standard length (SL). This makes it the smallest member of the genus. The largest is Piabucus dentatus, at 12.9 cm (5.1 in) SL, and the second-largest is Piabucus melanostoma, at 11.5 cm (4.5 in) SL. Members of Piabucus are characterized by a deep chest and long pectoral fins, which sets them apart from otherwise-similar members of sister genus Iguanodectes.

Piabucus caudomaculatus lacks an adipose fin. There is a spot of dark pigmentation on the lower jaw, a feature it shares with Piabucus melanostoma. There is another dark spot that extends from the caudal peduncle to the middle caudal-fin rays.

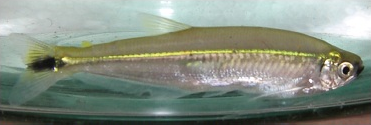
Piabucus melanostoma, to which P. caudomaculatus bears a notable resemblance

Visually, P. caudomaculatus bears similarities to congener P. melanostoma, but there are several differentiating characteristics in their respective morphometries. These include differences in lateral line scales (75-76 in caudomaculatus and 82–87 in melanostoma), dorsal-fin rays (8 or 9 vs. 11), and anal-fin rays (36-38 vs. 44–46). As well as in appearance, the two species are similar in dentition, both bearing a single tooth row in the premaxilla.

=== Sexual dimorphism ===
Males from all three species of Piabucus develop lappets (fleshy extensions) and small hooks on the foremost few rays of the anal fin. Similar sexual dimorphism is seen in all members of family Iguanodectidae, and is somewhat more common in related genus Bryconops.

== Taxonomy ==
Piabucus caudomaculatus has retained its original name since discovery, given to it by Richard P. Vari in 1977. It is the most recent addition to the genus.

While the other two species of Piabucus demonstrate intraspecific genetic variation that suggests unnamed species of Piabucus, P. caudomaculatus is largely confirmed to be monophyletic.

=== Etymology ===
"Caudo-" means "tail", and "-maculatus" means "spotted" (consider the word "immaculate", which means "without spots or blemishes"). The specific name for P. caudomaculatus originates in the dark spot of pigment across the caudal peduncle and the middle caudal-fin rays. The generic name "Piabucus" is a Latinization of the Brazilian word "piabucu", which refers to various small fishes of similar shape.

Piabucus caudomaculatus lacks a widely accepted common name, but hobbyists have reported a Piabucus species with strong resemblance to P. caudomaculatus being sold under the name "chin tetra". In an evaluation of non-native species, the South African government referred to it as the "spot-tailed slender tetra".

== Distribution and habitat ==
Piabucus caudomaculatus is only known from Bolivia, in the Mamoré river basin. Its type locality is a small, muddy waterway known as the Rio Matucare (Matucare river). The Mamoré river system generally has a high sediment load, and is considered a whitewater river, high in inorganic solids and particulates. The Matucare specifically is a small river, sometimes referred to as an arroyo (which is usually a smaller creek or stream) in literature and cartography.

Piabucus caudomaculatus demonstrates a general preference for slow-moving streams, including blackwater environments as well as its usual whitewater.

== Diet and ecology ==
Little is known of P. caudomaculatus in terms of diet or interactions with other fish species, but it is largely insectivorous. The Mamoré river and its tributaries are dense in aquatic vegetation, which provides an adequate breeding habitat for the invertebrates and insects upon which P. caudomaculatus feeds.

=== Presence and behavior in aquaria ===
It is unknown if P. caudomaculatus has an active presence in the aquarium industry, though fish bearing a strong resemblance to it are sometimes seen for sale. These could either be specimens of P. caudomaculatus or one of its congeners, but specific identity is infrequently confirmed.

== Conservation status ==
Piabucus caudomaculatus is considered a species of least concern by the IUCN. Still, its habitat faces various anthropogenic hazards. While rivers in the Mamoré basin are unaffected by dams or levees, there is still notable degradation of natural resources, including pollution from gold mining and an increased risk of entanglement in fishing nets. As it is a small species with a wide range, P. caudomaculatus is nonetheless unlikely to face increased survival pressures of particular remark.
