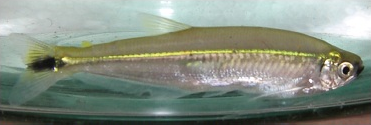
- Piabucus melanostoma

Conservation status
- Least Concern (IUCN 3.1)

Scientific classification
- Kingdom: Animalia
- Phylum: Chordata
- Class: Actinopterygii
- Division: Teleostei
- Order: Characiformes
- Family: Iguanodectidae
- Genus: Piabucus
- Species: P. melanostoma

Binomial name
- Piabucus melanostoma Holmberg, 1891

Synonyms
- Piabuca melanostoma Holmberg, 1891

= Piabucus melanostoma =

Species of fish

Piabucus melanostoma, sometimes called the chin tetra, is a species of freshwater ray-finned fish belonging to the family Iguanodectidae. This species is found in central South America. It is the second-largest species of the genus, but still only reaches about 12 cm (4 in) long. Occasionally found in captivity, it has an appealing iridescent-silver coloration. It is amongst the largest of fish still considered "tetras" in the aquarium hobby.

== Description ==
Piabucus melanostoma reaches a maximum of 11.5 cm (4.1 in) in SL (standard length). It is second-largest out of the three species in its genus; Piabucus caudomaculatus is the smallest, at 9.6 cm (3.8 in) SL, and Piabucus dentatus the largest, at 12.9 cm (5.0 in) SL. The scales are an iridescent silver-yellow, with a stripe of brighter silver down each side; this stripe ends in a patch of black on the middle caudal-fin rays. The lateral stripe may also display a touch of green or yellow. One of P. melanostoma's most distinctive characteristics is its lower jaw, which is colored black.

Notable morphometric characteristics include 44 to 46 anal-fin rays, 11 dorsal-fin rays, and 82 to 92 lateral-line scales. P. melanostoma also has some aspects similar to species in the genus Creagrutus; specifically, the structure of the fifth ceratobranchial is reminiscent. (The ceratobranchial is the longest bone in the branchial arches of fish, or the gill arches.) However, this feature (and related features) are the only similarity between P. melanostoma and any Creagrutus.

=== Sexual dimorphism ===
All three species of Piabucus develop hooks and lappets (fleshy extensions) on the first few rays of the anal fin, but further sexual dimorphism specifically in P. melanostoma is unknown.

== Taxonomy ==
Piabucus melanostoma has largely retained its baisonym, which was prescribed by Argentine natural historian Eduardo Ladislao Holmberg in 1891. The genus Piabucus was referred to as Piabuca at the time, but otherwise it has remained the same.

Research using DNA barcoding has discovered that P. melanostoma is made up of two distinct lineages, though they are not different species. The lineages are partially the result of the restricted population flow presented by a wide range combined with a low dispersion capacity - that is, isolated groups far apart from each other, with very little way to come in contact. The two lineages have different rivers of origin; the first is from the Paraguay, Bento Gomes and Cuiabá rivers, and the second is from the Bento Gomes and Cuiabá rivers only. Genetic flow between populations is aided by wetland flood cycles, which offer temporary transportation for relevant species.

=== Etymology ===
The genus name "piabucus" is a Latinization of the Brazilian Portuguese word "piaba", which is and was used to refer to various small characiform fishes. "Melano-" means "black" (as in the word "melanin"), and "stoma" is a Greek word that means "mouth" or "opening", in reference to the black lower lip and chin that P. melanostoma sports.

Modern scientists more often use melanostoma for the specific epithet, but the species is also easily found under the name melanostomus. This is because taxonomic convention dictates that the species name match the genus name in terms of linguistic gender, and "piabucus" is considered male, while "melanostoma" is considered female; "melanostomus" is considered male, and therefore matches the genus name.

Locals around the Rio Manso Reservoir sometimes use the common name "sardinha-de-gato", which means "cat sardine", for P. melanostoma. Argentinians sometimes refer to it as "mojarra de boca negra", which means "blackmouth minnow".

== Distribution and habitat ==
First described from Argentina, P. melanostoma is the only species from the family Iguanodectidae to be found in the Paraguay river basin. It is also found in the Maderia river basin, and is widespread across various floodplain areas in both regions. P. melanostoma is found especially easily in the Pantanal wetland region, which is largely within Mato Grosso, Brazil.

== Diet and ecology ==
Piabucus melanostoma is an omnivore that eats leaf litter, algae, invertebrates, and detritus. While little is known of sympatry with other species, P. melanostoma is known to occur in schools, as is the case with all members of the genus. It tends to swim near the surface of the water. Behavioral study is lacking.

=== Presence and behavior in aquaria ===
Piabucus melanostoma is known in the aquarium industry, but is not incredibly popular. It has been exported from Paraguay to various locations, including Germany. It is apparently amongst the largest ornamental fishes, specifically in comparison to other fishes that are also considered tetras.

== Conservation status ==
Piabucus melanostoma has been evaluated as Least Concern by the IUCN. Some researchers consider it a rare species. One of its preferred habitats, the Pantanal wetlands, is under anthropogenic pressures that include infrastructure development and pollution. Less than two percent of the area is under federal protection. Researchers have warned that the cumulative effect of various minor stressors could lead to a more catastrophic collapse if usage of the Pantanal is not more strictly regulated.
