= Rede Graal =

Brazilian gas station and restaurant chain

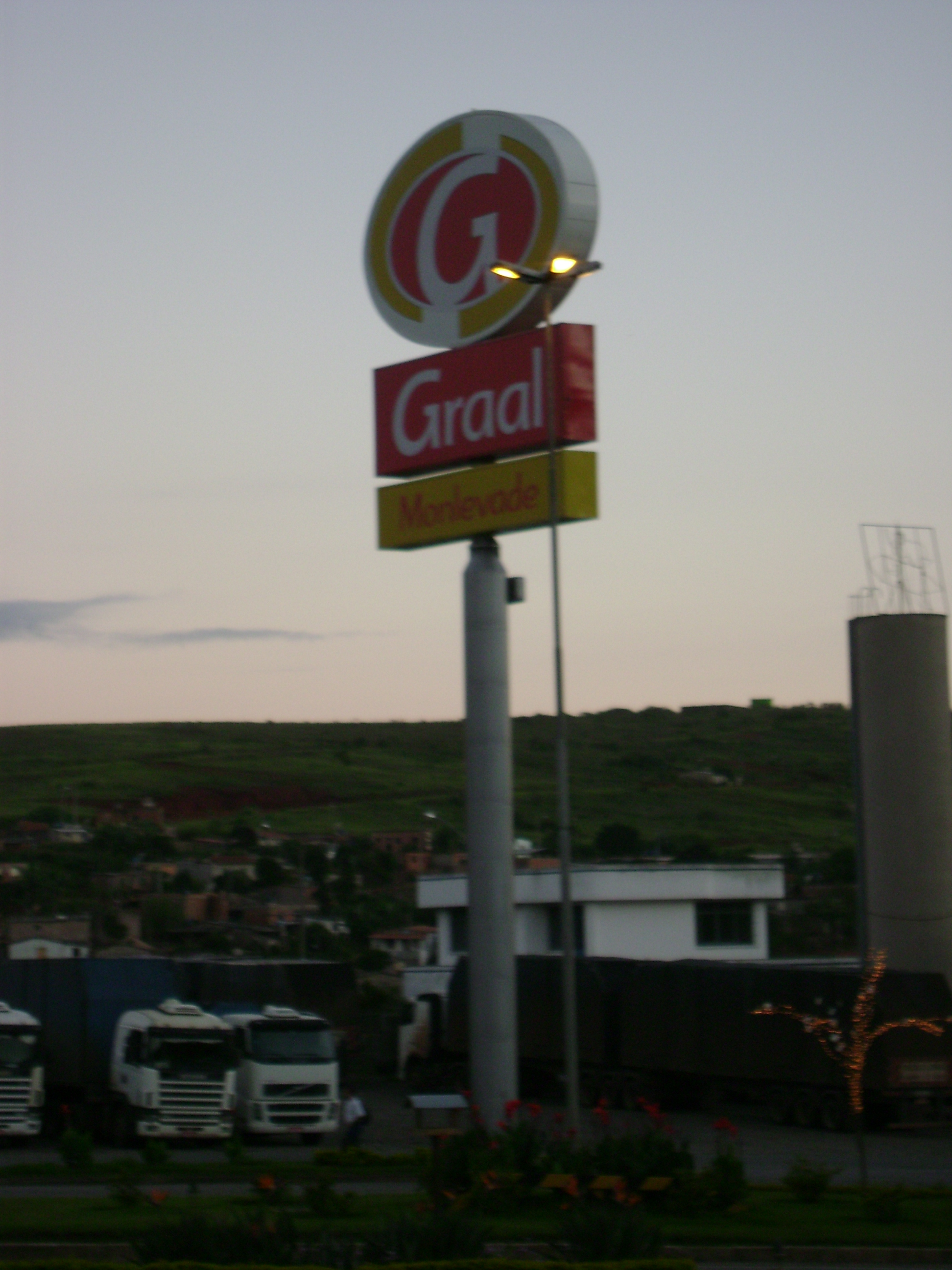
- Rede Graal location in João Monlevade, Minas Gerais, Brazil
- Type: Private
- Industry: Convenience store; Gas station; Fast food
- Founded: 1974; 52 years ago
- Founders: Antonio Eduardo da Rocha Alves; Manuel da Rocha Alves
- Area served: Brazil
- Products: Fuel, convenience food, etc.
- Website: www.redegraal.com.br

Rede Graal is a chain of gas stations and restaurants in Brazil, primarily located alongside highways in the states of São Paulo, Minas Gerais, Rio de Janeiro, Santa Catarina, and Rio Grande do Sul.

== History ==
Rede Graal was created in 1974 when the Alves family, the owners of a bakery located at Largo Treze de Maio in the South Zone of São Paulo, created their first location with a restaurant and gas station on the side of Rodovia Régis Bittencourt, called Graal Petropen. In May 2012, the chain opened its second location in the city of São Carlos.

Presenter Gugu Liberato was a frequent customer of one of their locations.

== Operations ==
=== Thematization ===
Graal locations each have a specific theme in their design, such that they can resemble a time of the year or the region that they located in.

Examples of such thematic designs include store #56, located in the city of Jundiaí, which was built in an art deco design, or the location in the city of Perdões in the state of Minas Gerais, which includes aspects of the states culture in its design.

=== Subsidiaries ===
Since 2000, Graal has created subsidiary brands seeking to attract different types of consumers. They have names associated with the services offered by the company to their customers.

These subsidiaries are the following: Route Café, Bella Farinha, NYC Burger, Tony's, Più Italia (previously Più Pizza), Pasta & Grill, Empório Graal, OhSushi, Via Grill, Via Lev, Parmegiana & Cia, CQG (Controle de Qualidade Graal), Caminho da Moda, Petrograal, and Recanto do Caminhoneiro. Along with these subsidiaries, they also own a chain of hotels called Graal Inn Hotéis.

Graal locations can have a various of these subsidiaries, depending on where the location is.

=== Events ===
Graal also makes gifts for events, such as for the 2014 edition of the São Paulo International Motor Show with the showing of a replica of a DeLorean.
