= Piabucus dentatus =

Conservation status
- Least Concern (IUCN 3.1)

Scientific classification
- Kingdom: Animalia
- Phylum: Chordata
- Class: Actinopterygii
- Division: Teleostei
- Order: Characiformes
- Family: Iguanodectidae
- Genus: Piabucus
- Species: P. dentatus

Binomial name
- Piabucus dentatus (Kölreuter, 1763)

Synonyms
- Trutta dentata Kölreuter, 1763; Salmo argentinus Linnaeus, 1766

Species of fish

Piabucus dentatus, also called the chin tetra or the coastal piabucus, is a species of freshwater ray-finned fish belonging to the family Iguanodectidae. This species is found in coastal rivers of northern South America. Preferred habitats are generally high in silt content and are slow-moving, including floodplain streams and estuaries.

It is one of the earliest known South American fish in Northern ichthyology, believed to have been recorded first in 1648. It did not have a standard scientific name until 1766, though it had an earlier description in 1763 without a binomial moniker. German botanist Joseph Gottlieb Kölreuter was responsible for the 1763 description, while Swedish taxonomist Carl Linnaeus prescribed its first true scientific name - Salmo argentinus - in 1766.

== Description ==
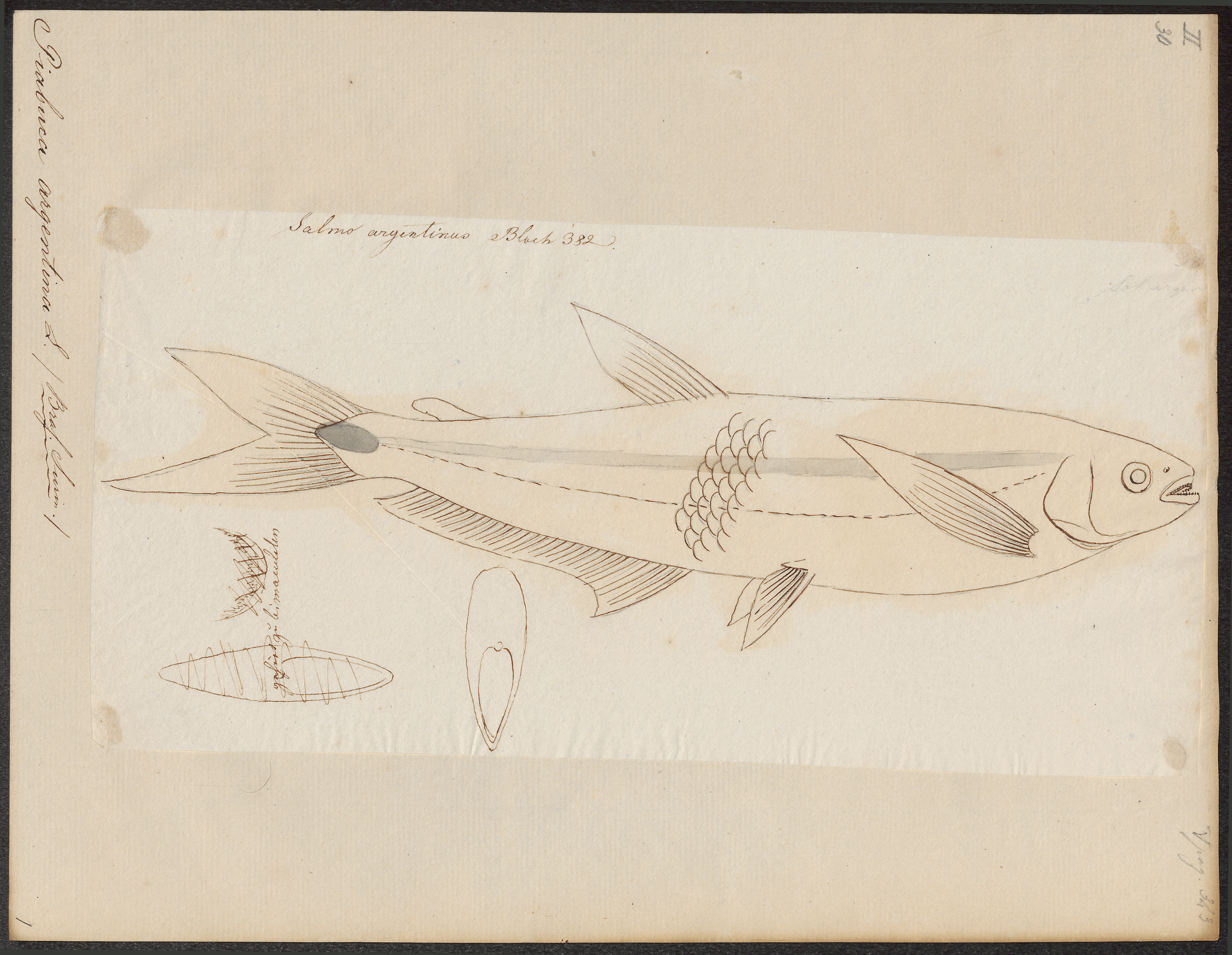
A 16th-century illustration of Piabucus dentatus from the collection of the University of Amsterdam. At the time, P. dentatus was referred to as Salmo argentinus.

Piabucus dentatus reaches a maximum length of 12.9 cm (5.1 in) SL (standard length), which makes it the largest of its genus. It has a generally slender body with a deep chest and long pectoral fins, which are characteristics that differentiate Piabucus from sister genus Iguanodectes. It is elongated and slight, with a compressed "torpedo" shape. It has a generally silvery color with a dark lateral stripe; its scales may reflect blue light ventrally, and its lateral line may contain yellow-gold and green. Congener Piabucus melanostoma has a distinctive patch of dark coloration on the lower jaw often absent in related species, but similar markings can be found on some specimens of P. dentatus.

The presence of an adipose fin can be used to differentiate P. dentatus from its similar congeners. Notable morphometric characteristics include 80-84 perforated scales in the lateral line, 11 dorsal-fin rays, and 45-46 anal-fin rays. The dorsal and ventral fins are short, and the middle rays of the caudal fin are often pigmented, but the fins otherwise lack markings. Juvenile P. dentatus have rounder heads, smaller mouths, and a body that is proportionally elongate. Starting at a length of roughly 2 cm, juveniles start to resemble small adults.

=== Sexual dimorphism ===
Sexual dimorphism is minor in P. dentatus, but present. Males tend to reach larger measurements in SL than females, and the anal fin is longer, with the last branched fin-ray reaching past the origin of the caudal fin. The anal fin is also more robust in males - specifically, the scaled anal-fin rays (lepidotrichia, meaning "scaled hair") are thicker, with sturdier segments (hemitrichia, meaning "partial hair") in the halves that make them up. Males from all three species of Piabucus also develop lappets (fleshy extensions) and small hooks on the foremost few rays of the anal fin.

== Taxonomy ==
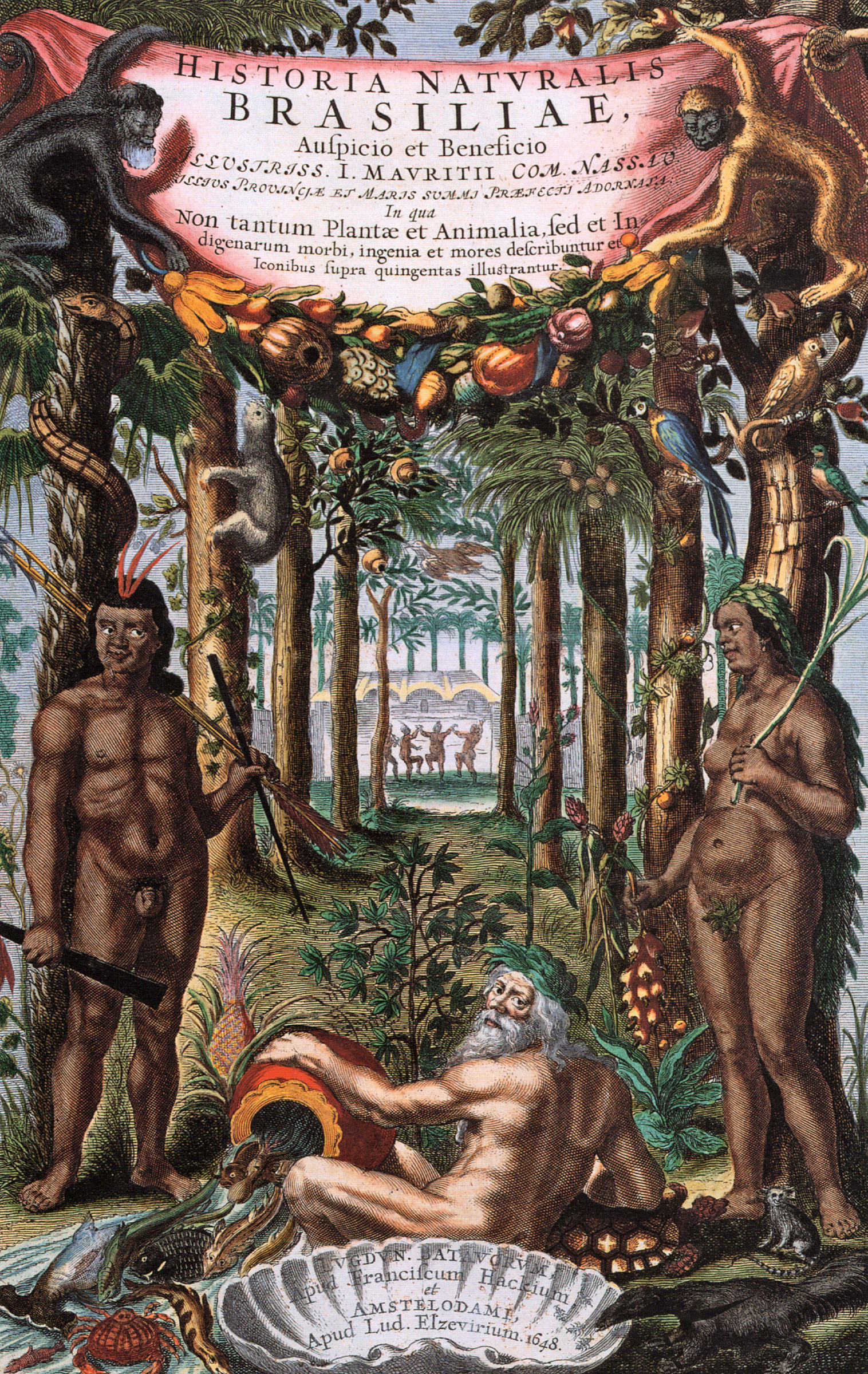
The cover of Historia Naturalis Brasiliae, in which P. dentatus was remarked upon but not named

Piabucus dentatus was the only member of the genus Piabucus upon introduction in 1817 by German biologist Lorenz Oken. P. dentatus became the type species therein by way of monotypy. Prior, P. dentatus was referred to as Salmo argentinus. When first described by Joseph Gottlieb Kölreuter in 1763, P. dentatus did not have a binomial name, though Kölreuter did introduce the now-obsolete genus Piabucu. Piabucu was based on the work of German naturalist Georg Marcgrave, in his 1648 book Historia Naturalis Brasiliae. Marcgrave's Piabucu is considered in modern research to be equivalent to P. dentatus, making it one of the earliest-recorded South American fishes in Northern ichthyology.

There are multiple reports that the baisonym of P. dentatus is Trutta dentata, partially because American ichthyologist James Erwin Böhlke reported as much in a 1954 paper. Subsequently, French ichthyologist Jacques Géry did the same in a paper from 1972. However, "trutta dentata" is a Latin term that means "toothed trout", and was not a scientific name in the strictest sense; rather, it is an outdated label for classifying fish, and comes in opposition to "trutta edentula", which means "toothless trout", wherein "trout" was generally used to refer to morphology as opposed to phylogeny. (To this day, dentition - or lack thereof - remains a morphometric feature that can be used to differentiate fish species of similar superficial appearance.)

Furthermore, the Biodiversity Heritage Library has records of the phrase "trutta dentata" dating back to the year 1740, but "trutta" as a genus was not in use by ichthyologists until 1764, named by French zoologist François Alexandre Pierre de Garsault. P. dentatus could not have realistically been considered a member of genus Trutta in 1763, because Trutta did not exist in the generic sense; rather, it was more of a rough grouping, without the standardization of modern taxonomy. (The genus Trutta is now considered obsolete, having been synonymized with genus Salmo.) As such, its true baisonym is most likely Salmo argentinus, prescribed by Swedish taxonomist Carl Linnaeus in 1766. The report from Koelreuter in 1763 remains its original description, despite the species not having a standard name at the time.

== Etymology ==
The specific epithet "dentatus" refers to the dense set of 16 teeth present at the end of each mandible, as "dentatus" means "teeth". "Piabucus" is a Latinization of the Brazilian word "piabucu", which was and is used to refer to various small fishes of similar appearance.

The common name "chin tetra" actually originates from markings seen on Piabucus melanostoma. P. melanostoma has a dark patch on the lower jaw, but is otherwise similar to its congeners, which means that all three are sometimes referred to by the same common name. The common name "coastal piabucus" comes from the fact that P. dentatus is common in estuaries and brackish waters along the northeastern coast of South America.

== Distribution and habitat ==
Piabucus dentatus is a coastal dweller, found in river drainages from Venezuela's Paria Gulf to the mouth of the Amazon river. It demonstrates a preference for silty, turbid waters, including estuaries, floodplain streams, and various river tributaries, which places it in some brackish environments. Ichthyologist Carl H. Eigenmann once mistakenly cited it from Peru, and further instances from Bolivia are misidentifications. Though infrequent, it is found in Suriname.

== Diet and ecology ==
Examination of stomach contents has shown that P. dentatus is a generalist feeder with a preference for algae and decaying plant matter, though it also targets microscopic invertebrates. Its varied diet earns it different classifications across various studies; it is classified as a detritivore based on its consumption of leaf litter, a micropredator based on its consumption of micro-invertebrates, or an algivore based on its consumption of various types of algae.

Piabucus dentatus is known to be a schooling fish with a non-confrontational temperament. It tends to dwell near the surface of the water, and is often an active swimmer. Little is known of specific reproductive habits, but aspects of its biology indicate that it is likely an egg-scattering species that does not guard its young.

=== Presence and behavior in aquaria ===
While P. dentatus is known from the aquarium trade, and congeners are also seen in the industry, information on species-specific behavior and care is somewhat limited. Hobbyists report a generally pleasant disposition, but its large size in comparison to other aquarium tetras results in an intimidating presence for smaller fishes; still, it is often an appropriate addition to a community tank. It is known to be a generalist feeder that will accept most flake and pellet food, as well as biting at soft-leaved aquarium plants and hair algae.

== Conservation status ==
Piabucus dentatus is considered a species of least concern by the IUCN. While it lives in habitats under various anthropogenic pressures, including dam construction, oil drilling, and infrastructural development, there is no evidence of an immediate population threat. For instance, one study demonstrated that hydroelectric dam construction decreased general species diversity, but P. dentatus in particular seemed to suffer only mild consequences.
