= Periquito =

- Municipality
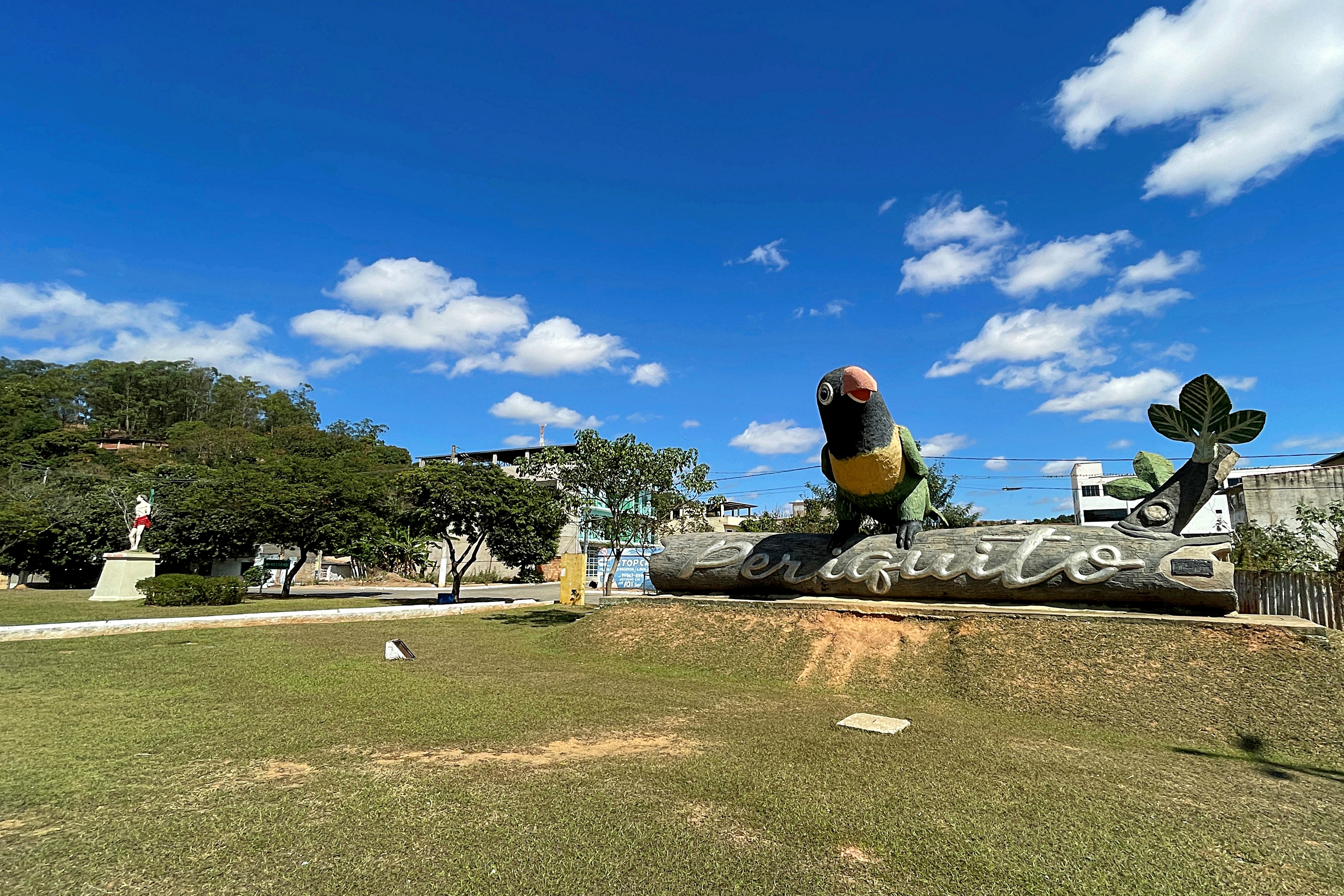
- Statue of Saint Sebastian and a big periquito (parakeet)

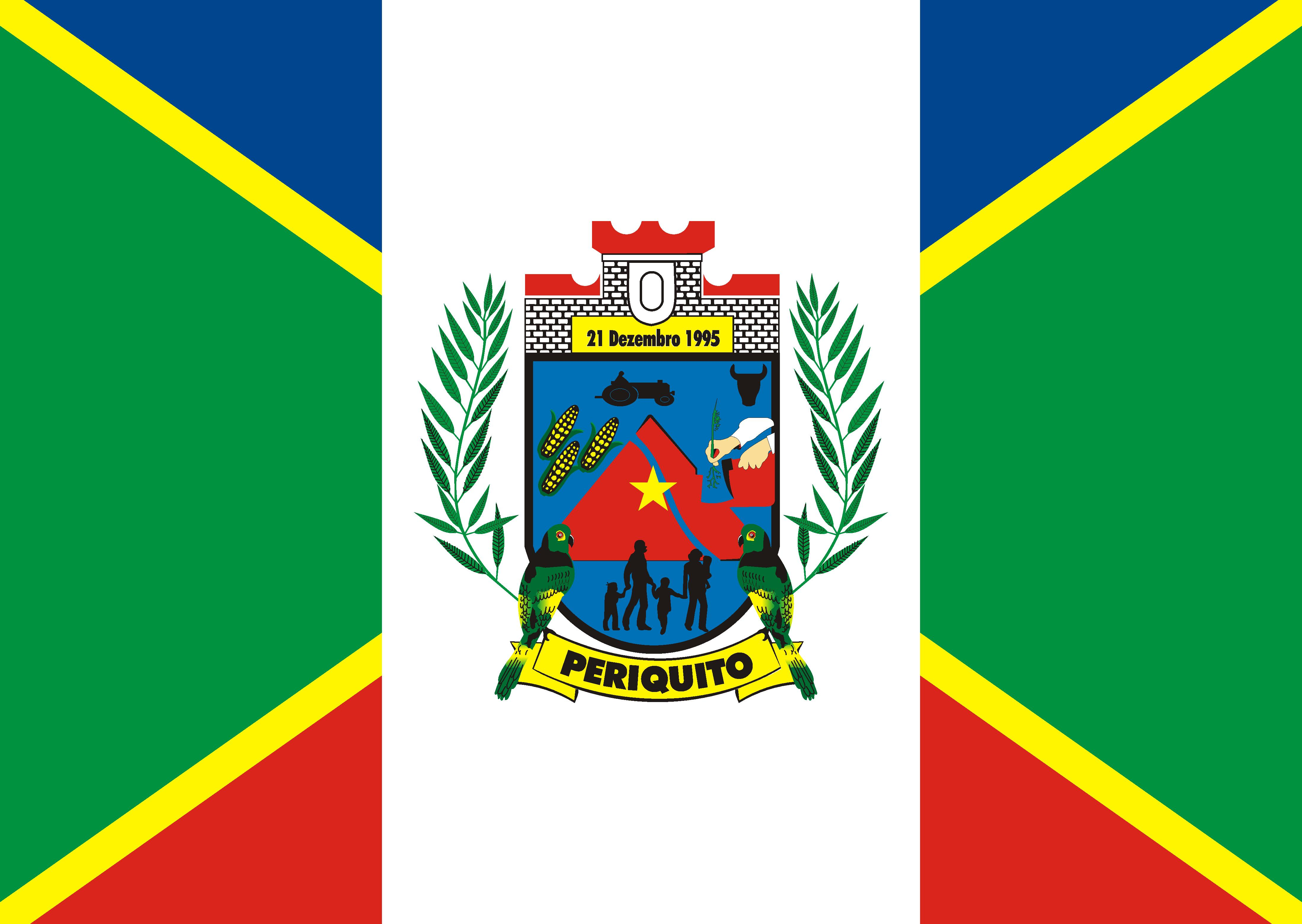
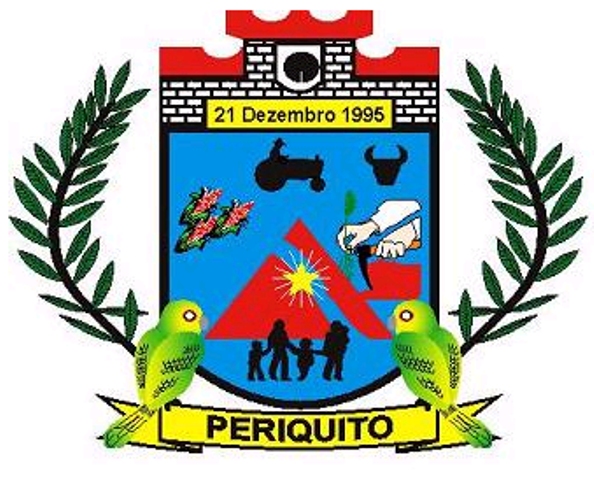
- Flag Coat of arms

- Location in Brazil
- Coordinates: 19°9′28″S 42°14′2″W
- Country: Brazil
- Region: Southeast
- State: Minas Gerais
- Mesoregion: Vale do Rio Doce

Population (2020)
  - Total: 6,773
- Time zone: UTC−3 (BRT)

Periquito is a municipality in the state of Minas Gerais in the Southeast region of Brazil.

== See also ==
- List of municipalities in Minas Gerais
