= Careaçu =

- Municipality
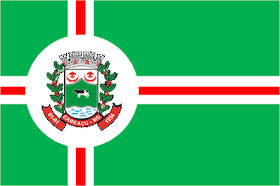
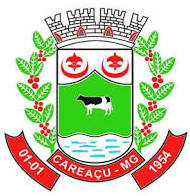
- Flag Coat of arms

- Location in Brazil
- Coordinates: 22°2′34″S 45°41′56″W
- Country: Brazil
- Region: Southeast
- State: Minas Gerais
- Mesoregion: Sul/Sudoeste de Minas

Population (2020)
  - Total: 6,792
- Time zone: UTC−3 (BRT)

Careaçu is a municipality in the state of Minas Gerais in the Southeast region of Brazil.

== See also ==
- List of municipalities in Minas Gerais
