= Estiva =

- Municipality
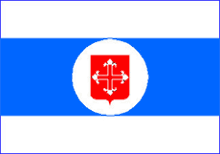
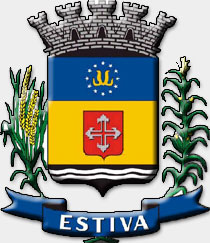
- Flag Coat of arms

- Location in Minas Gerais state

- Location in Brazil
- Coordinates: 22°27′46″S 46°1′1″W
- Country: Brazil
- Region: Southeast
- State: Minas Gerais

Area
  - Total: 244 km^{2} (94 sq mi)

Population (2020)
  - Total: 11,386
  - Density: 46.7/km^{2} (121/sq mi)
- Time zone: UTC−3 (BRT)

Estiva is a municipality in the state of Minas Gerais in Brazil. The population is 11,386 (2020 est.) in an area of 244 km^{2}.

== See also ==
- List of municipalities in Minas Gerais
