= Carmo da Cachoeira =

Brazilian municipality in the south of the state of Minas Gerais

- Municipality
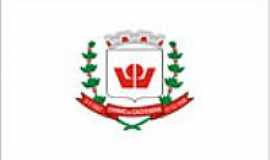
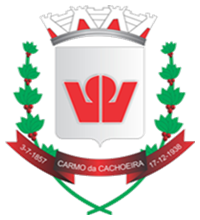
- Flag Coat of arms
- Interactive map of Carmo da Cachoeira
- Country: Brazil
- State: Minas Gerais
- Region: Southeast
- Time zone: UTC−3 (BRT)

Location of Carmo da Cachoeira in the state of Minas Gerais

Carmo da Cachoeira is a Brazilian municipality in the south of the state of Minas Gerais. In 2020 its estimated population was 12,182 in a total area of 506 km^{2}. The elevation is 959 meters.

== Geography ==
Carmo da Cachoeira is part of the IBGE statistical microregion of Varginha. It is 35 km. northeast of that regional center and is just off the important BR-381 highway. The distance to state capital, Belo Horizonte is 274 km.

=== Climate ===
The climate is mile with average temperatures varying between 19 and 25 degrees. In the summer the maximum can reach 34C and in the winter it can go down as low as 2C.

== Economy ==
The main economic activities are coffee growing and milk production. Coffee alone was planted in 9,000 hectares (2006). There was also cultivation of corn (4,000 ha.), beans, sugarcane, and potatoes. In 2006 there were 532 rural producers with a total agricultural area of 36,221 ha. Over 6,300 people were dependent on agriculture. There was one financial institution.

== Health ==
In the health sector there were 4 public and 1 private clinics. The nearest hospital was in Varginha. In the educational sector there were 6 primary schools and 1 middle school.

== Municipal Human Development Index ==
MHDI: 0.655

State ranking: 516 out of 853 municipalities

National ranking: 863 out of 5,570 municipalities

Life expectancy: 73 years

Literacy rate: 83,9%

For the complete list, see: Frigoletto

== See also ==
- List of municipalities in Minas Gerais
