= São João do Manteninha =

- Municipality

- Location in Brazil
- Coordinates: 18°43′15″S 41°9′36″W
- Country: Brazil
- Region: Southeast
- State: Minas Gerais
- Mesoregion: Vale do Rio Doce

Population (2022 Census)
  - Total: 5,331
  - Estimate (2025): 5,479
- Time zone: UTC−3 (BRT)

São João do Manteninha is a municipality in the state of Minas Gerais in the Southeast region of Brazil.

== See also ==
- List of municipalities in Minas Gerais
