= Bela Vista de Minas =

Coordinates: 19°49′48″S 43°05′27″W

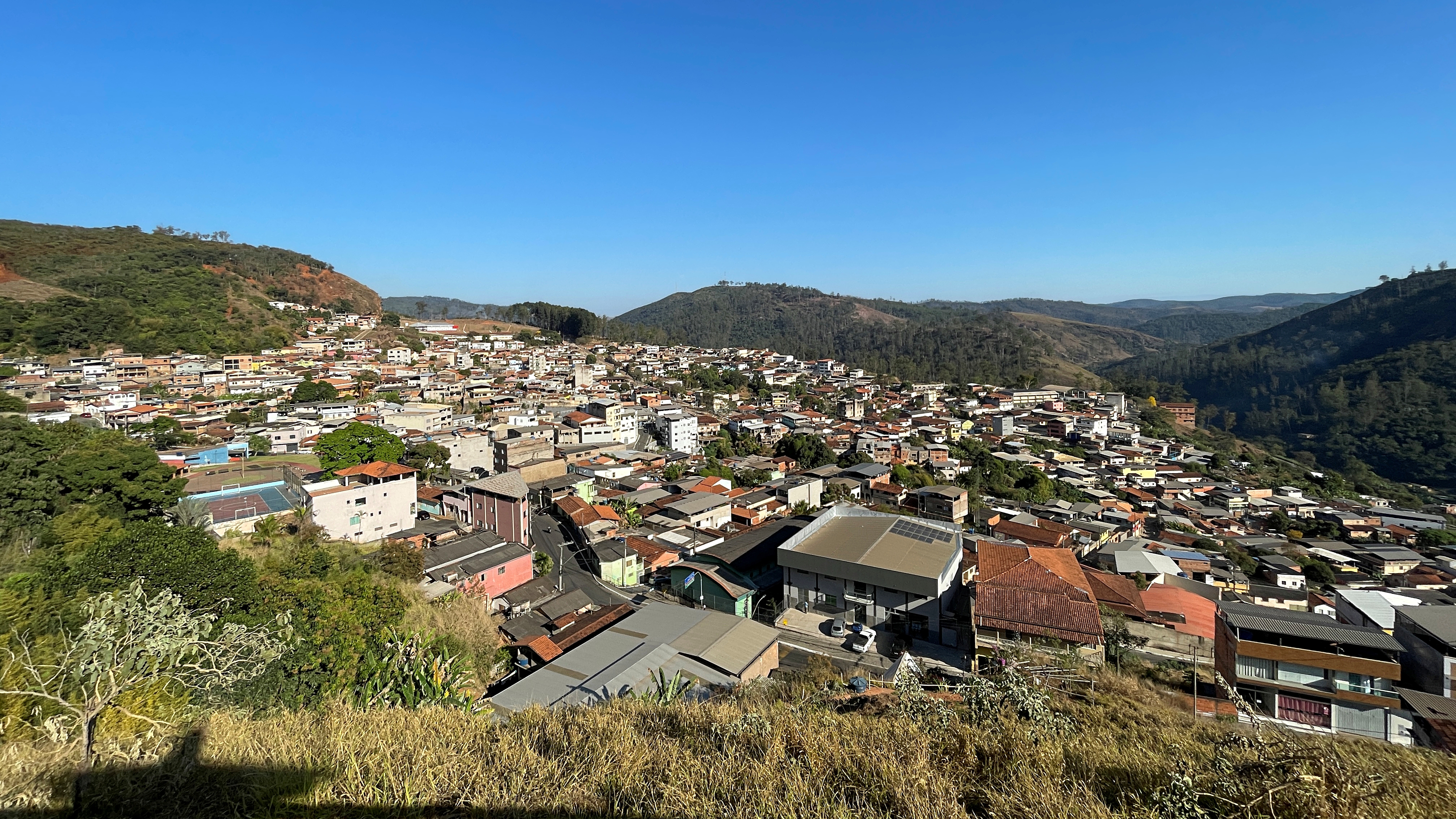
- Partial view of Bela Vista de Minas seen from the statue of Christ the Redeemer of the city

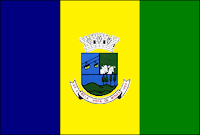
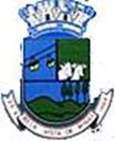
- Flag Coat of arms

- Location of Bela Vista de Minas within Minas Gerais
- Country: Brazil
- Region: Região Sudeste do Brasil
- State: Minas Gerais
- Founded: 20 October 1961

Government
  - Mayor: Wilber Jose de Souza (DEM)

Area
  - Total: 108.606 km^{2} (41.933 sq mi)

Population (2020)
  - Total: 10,262
- Time zone: UTC−3 (BRT)

Bela Vista de Minas is a Brazilian municipality located in the state of Minas Gerais. The population as of 2025 is estimated to be 14,332 people. The city belongs to the mesoregion Metropolitana de Belo Horizonte and to the microregion of Itabira.

== See also ==
- List of municipalities in Minas Gerais
