= São Joaquim de Bicas =

Municipality in Minas Gerais, Brazil

Coordinates: 20°02′56″S 44°16′26″W

- Municipality
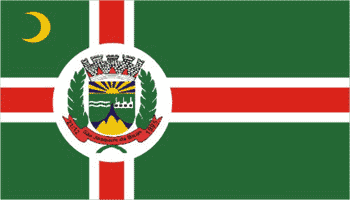
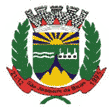
- Flag Coat of arms
- Interactive map of São Joaquim de Bicas
- Country: Brazil
- State: Minas Gerais
- Region: Southeast

Population (2022 Census)
  - Total: 34,348
  - Estimate (2025): 37,017
- Time zone: UTC−3 (BRT)

Location of São Joaquim de Bicas within Minas Gerais

São Joaquim de Bicas is a Brazilian municipality located in the state of Minas Gerais. The city belongs to the mesoregion Metropolitana de Belo Horizonte and to the microregion of Belo Horizonte. As of 2025, the estimated population was 37,017.

== See also ==
- List of municipalities in Minas Gerais
