= Itatiaiuçu =

- Municipality
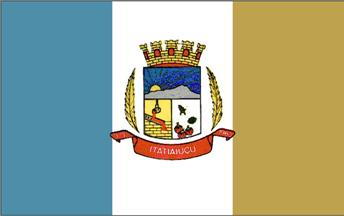
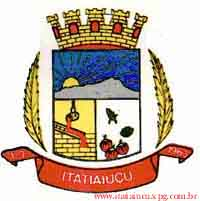
- Flag Coat of arms

- Location in Brazil
- Coordinates: 20°11′49″S 44°25′15″W
- Country: Brazil
- Region: Southeast
- State: Minas Gerais
- Mesoregion: Metropolitana de Belo Horizonte

Population (2022 Census)
  - Total: 12,966
  - Estimate (2025): 13,779
- Time zone: UTC−3 (BRT)

Itatiaiuçu is a municipality in the state of Minas Gerais in the Southeast region of Brazil.

Nestled amidst the Ridge Mountains, on the slopes of the Sierra Itatiaiuçu in Metal Zone, the municipality with 267 square kilometers, whose main economic activity is the mining of iron. It is also great horticultural producer and also has beef and dairy cattle. In a temperate climate tending to the cold, the host city is 890 meters above sea level and is 70 kilometers from Belo Horizonte, located along the BR-381 (Fernão Dias Highway) connecting the Minas Gerais state to the state of São Paulo.

The municipality is divided into eight villages and two districts: Santa Terezinha de Minas and Pinheiros.

== See also ==
- List of municipalities in Minas Gerais
