= Rio Manso =

- Municipality
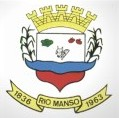
- Coat of arms

- Location in Brazil
- Coordinates: 20°15′54″S 44°18′28″W
- Country: Brazil
- Region: Southeast
- State: Minas Gerais
- Mesoregion: Metropolitana de Belo Horizonte

Population (2022 Census)
  - Total: 5,568
  - Estimate (2025): 5,746
- Time zone: UTC−3 (BRT)

Rio Manso is a municipality in the state of Minas Gerais in the Southeast region of Brazil.

== See also ==
- List of municipalities in Minas Gerais
