= São Gonçalo do Rio Abaixo =

Human settlement in Brazil

Coordinates: 19°49′33″S 43°21′43″W

- Municipality
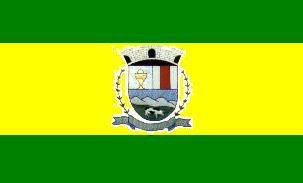
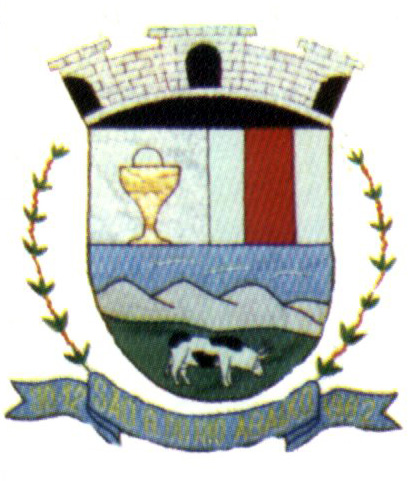
- Flag Coat of arms
- Interactive map of São Gonçalo do Rio Abaixo
- Country: Brazil
- State: Minas Gerais
- Region: Southeast
- Time zone: UTC−3 (BRT)

Location of São Gonçalo do Rio Abaixo within Minas Gerais

São Gonçalo do Rio Abaixo is a Brazilian municipality located in the state of Minas Gerais. The city belongs to the mesoregion Metropolitana de Belo Horizonte and to the microregion of Itabira. As of 2020, the estimated population was 11,019.

== See also ==
- List of municipalities in Minas Gerais
