= Iguanodectes variatus =

Conservation status
- Least Concern (IUCN 3.1)

Scientific classification
- Kingdom: Animalia
- Phylum: Chordata
- Class: Actinopterygii
- Order: Characiformes
- Family: Iguanodectidae
- Genus: Iguanodectes
- Species: I. variatus

Binomial name
- Iguanodectes variatus Géry, 1993

Species of fish

Iguanodectes variatus is a species of freshwater ray-finned fish belonging to the family Iguanodectidae. This species is found in South America. It has a minor presence in the aquarium trade, but lacks the popularity that would make excessive wild capture a legitimate threat. That being said, the threats facing South American aquatic environments are of ongoing concern for the associated biodiversity. Still, I. variatus has been recorded from various rivers and has shown general adaptability to its environment, which speaks to a high survivability.

== Description ==
Iguanodectes variatus reaches a maximum of 10.3 cm (4.1 in) standard length (SL). As with the rest of its genus, its base scale color ranges from silver to silvery-yellow (more often the former), but it has characteristic mottling on its sides in light-brown. The top of the snout is also colored brownish, which can help distinguish it from similar-looking congeners, though the light-brown mottling is unique to I. variatus within Iguanodectes regardless. It has a lateral line in reflective green, somewhat reminiscent of congener I. spilurus, and it has a dark stripe on its caudal fin that strictly occupies the middle portion therein.

Species of Iguanodectes are generally narrow-bodied and slender, drawing comparisons to smelt or minnows. They usually bear some resemblance to sister genus Piabucus, but members of Piabucus have deeper chests and longer pectoral fins.

=== Sexual dimorphism ===
The sexual dimorphism, or lack thereof, within I. variatus specifically is unknown. However, male specimens of several congeners demonstrate small hooks or spines on the first few rays of the anal fin during mating season, such as I. geisleri and I. purusii, which suggests the possibility of similar features in I. variatus. This particular dimorphism is not uncommon within the family Iguanodectidae as a whole, and is slightly more prevalent in familial genus Bryconops.

== Taxonomy ==
Named in 1993, I. variatus is one of three species described by French ichthyologist Jacques Géry in its nominal paper; the other two are congeners Iguanodectes polylepis and Iguanodectes gracilis. These three species are the most recent additions to the genus, out of eight species total. I. variatus has retained its original name, and has no known synonyms.

DNA barcoding has revealed some genetic similarity to related species Bryconops melanurus, though not enough for it to be of taxonomic note.

=== Etymology ===
The specific name "variatus" means "spotting", as in "variation of color", which is in reference to the mottling on the sides of adults. The generic name "Iguanodectes", while without a specified origin in its nominal text, is likely from "iguana", the lizard, and "dectes", meaning "bite" or "tooth".

== Distribution and habitat ==
Iguanodectes variatus is found throughout the basins of the Branco, Guaporé, Trombetas, and Urubu rivers, as well as the Madeira. This restricts its range to Brazil. It was originally described from a stream called the Igarapé Jatuarana, in the Guaporé watershed. Furthermore, it has most often been sighted in the upper portions of the water column, inhabiting areas of somewhat stronger current.

== Diet and ecology ==
Though information regarding the diet of I. variatus is somewhat sparse, aquarists report omnivorous tendencies. The general tooth structure suggests food intake similar to the rest of the genus, including filamentous algae and aquatic invertebrates. Other reports of Iguanodectes as a whole describe a more herbivorous disposition.

It is reportedly a social fish that prefers to live in schools, which is in keeping with habits seen in the rest of the genus. The specific extent of sympatry with other species is unknown, but it is known to be widespread and adaptable in nature, and is thus unlikely to be particularly territorial.

=== Presence and behavior in aquaria ===
The genus Iguanodectes as a whole is not often exported for trade from within its native range. Several species are more popular than I. variatus, including I. geisleri, I. adujai, and I. spilurus. However, I. variatus is at least of minor note in aquaria, seen in reports from hobbyists in European locations such as Poland.

== Conservation status ==
Iguanodectes variatus has not been evaluated by the IUCN. It is known to live in areas affected by the pesticide Chlorpyrifos, though knowledge of its response to contamination has not been published. Otherwise, it is wide-ranging and adaptable, which means a stable population and a low likelihood of endangerment.
