= Iguanodectes purusii =

Conservation status
- Least Concern (IUCN 3.1)

Scientific classification
- Kingdom: Animalia
- Phylum: Chordata
- Class: Actinopterygii
- Order: Characiformes
- Family: Iguanodectidae
- Genus: Iguanodectes
- Species: I. purusii

Binomial name
- Iguanodectes purusii Steindachner, 1908

Synonyms
- Piabuca purusii Steindachner, 1908

Species of fish

Iguanodectes purusii is a species of freshwater ray-finned fish belonging to the family Iguanodectidae. This species is found in South America. It is largely herbivorous, and prefers to live in schools. The name "purusii" originates from the species' type locality, the Purus river basin of Brazil, with a range that also extends into Peru. Furthermore, it has been documented from the Amazon, Madeira, Guaporé, and Pastaza rivers, but specific study of its ecology is otherwise lacking.

== Description ==
Iguanodectes purusii is a small fish, reaching a maximum of 7.5 cm (2.9 in) standard length (SL). Iguanodectes as a genus is generally shallow-chested and narrow-bodied, with short pectoral fins, and I. purusii is no exception to this. The anal-fin origin is slightly posterior to the middle of the body, the dorsal fin the same, and the fins are largely hyaline (clear).

Many members of Iguanodectes have a base scale color that is yellow to yellowish-silver, but I. purusii more frequently demonstrates plain silver; nonetheless, it may be confused with congener Iguanodectes geisleri, as both species have a lateral-line stripe in three colors (red, yellow, and black, from top-to-bottom). I. purusii is noted to be particularly similar in coloration to congener Iguanodectes spilurus. There is a patch of dark pigmentation on the junction of the caudal-fin lobes that extends onto the upper lobe, not dissimilar to related species Bryconops melanurus. The lateral stripe is rather narrow.

=== Sexual dimorphism ===
The sexual dimorphism of I. purusii is minor. There are no morphometric or coloration differences, but males may or may not demonstrate small hooks on the anal fin-rays during certain months of the year, specifically November.

== Taxonomy ==
Upon description by Austrian zoologist Franz Steindachner in 1908, I. purusii was assigned the baisonym Piabucus purusii. In later publications (1970 and 1993), French ichthyologist Jaqcues Géry reassigned it to the genus Iguanodectes based upon the differences in body shape. Géry speculated that Steindachner considered all similar species to belong to Piabucus, and declined to include Iguanodectes in relevant taxonomical study.

A species from the related genus Bryconops, Bryconops transitoria, continues to undergo taxonomic evaluation to this day, and an examination of some of the earliest collected specimens revealed that one of them was actually a specimen of I. purusii. It is unlikely that this was a case of mistaken identity, as the responsible scientist (Steindachner) had described both species; more likely, it was the result of a simple mis-label.

=== Etymology ===
The specific name "purusii" originates from the type locality, the Purus river. "Iguanodectes" was not given a specific meaning in the publication of origin, but modern etymological evaluation concludes that the likely bases are "iguana", the lizard, and "dectes", meaning bite or tooth, in reference to the "lizard-like" dentition.

== Distribution and habitat ==
Iguanodectes purusii was first described from the Purus river basin of Brazil. In modern times, its range is known to encompass the Purus, Amazon, Madeira, Guaporé, and Pastaza rivers, including various tributaries. Though little is known of specific biotope preferences, I. purusii has been documented to stay near the surface of the water.

== Diet and ecology ==
Iguanodectes purusii is largely herbivorous, occasionally feeding on insects that make their way into the water from outside. This is in line with Iguanodectes as a genus, which is composed mostly of herbivores. Little is known of the ecology of Iguanodectes, though limited observations exist of several species in aquaria, including I. purusii.

=== Presence and behavior in aquaria ===
Though rarely imported for trade, several members of Iguanodectes are known in the aquarium industry. I. purusii is uncommon, but is noted to be a peaceful inhabitant of community tanks, and prefers living in groups of 5 to 10 individuals. Aquarists warn of a general sensitivity to surroundings during transport and during acclimation to a new environment.

== Conservation status ==
Iguanodectes purusii has not evaluated by the IUCN as being Least Concern. Its type locality, the Purus river, is under environmental pressure from anthropogenic sources that include deforestation and agricultural development. The lattermost factor has a documented negative effect on water quality, including increased levels of pesticides and fecal contamination. Nonetheless, I. purusii has a broad range that encompasses a good handful of river basins; thus, its population is likely to remain stable.
