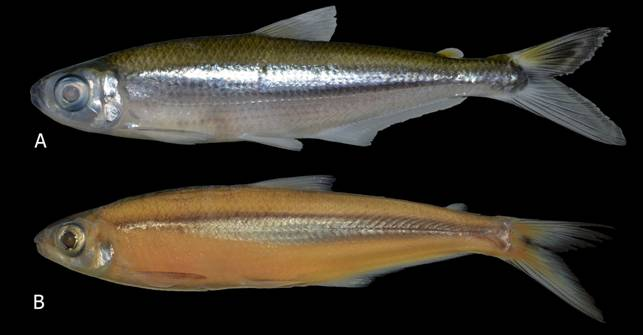
- Live (top) and preserved (bottom) specimens

Conservation status
- Least Concern (IUCN 3.1)

Scientific classification
- Kingdom: Animalia
- Phylum: Chordata
- Class: Actinopterygii
- Order: Characiformes
- Family: Iguanodectidae
- Genus: Bryconops
- Species: B. gracilis

Binomial name
- Bryconops gracilis (C. H. Eigenmann, 1908)

Synonyms
- Creatochanes gracilis C. H. Eigenmann, 1908

= Bryconops gracilis =

Species of fish

Bryconops gracilis is a small species of freshwater ray-finned fish belonging to the family Iguanodectidae. This fish is found in South America. It is one of multiple species for which the common name "lambari" is used. Though not well-studied, it has been re-described in recent years in order to differentiate it from Bryconops alburnoides, a congener to which it bears a strong resemblance.

== Description ==
The holotype of Bryconops gracilis - the very first collected specimen - was reported at 7.5 cm (2.9 in) in SL (standard length, with the length of the tail fin excluded). Further specimens of B. gracilis range from 6.1 to 12.3 cm (2.4 to 4.8 in) SL. Like the rest of Bryconops, B. gracilis has a slender body reminiscent of a minnow's. Its body is also on the shallower side when compared to other members of its genus, a feature it shares with B. alburnoides, B. collettei, and B. magoi.

Bryconops gracilis is frequently confused with congener Bryconops alburnoides, the type species of the genus. This is because they share several morphological traits, such as a yellowish caudal fin, high number of lateral line scales, and overall elongated body shape. Both B. gracilis and B. alburnoides have 54 to 62 pored lateral line scales. Early descriptions also drew comparisons to Bryconops melanurus (then called Creatochanes melanurus) due to morphological overlap.

== Taxonomy ==
When it was originally described by German-American ichthyologist Carl H. Eigenmann in 1908, B. gracilis was named Creatochanes gracilis. It is still occasionally referenced under that name.

Eigenmann's original nomenclature retains an element of validity in the current day. This is because there are two subgenera in Bryconops, Bryconops and Creatochanes, and the latter draws from Eigenmann's work. However, B. gracilis belongs to the subgenus Bryconops, making its full name Bryconops (Bryconops) gracilis. It shares this subgenus with congener B. alburnoides, with which it has been confused in the past, but similar congener B. melanurus is in Creatochanes.

Bryconops gracilis is an iguanodectid (part of the family Iguanodectidae). This is a fairly recent classification, and was prompted by a review of the family Characidae in 2011 wherein the genera Bryconops, Piabucus, and Iguanodectes were all moved from Characidae to Iguanodectidae. Some sources still list B. gracilis as a characin.

=== Etymology ===
The specific epithet gracilis means "slender" (note the similarity to the word "graceful"), and is in reference to the narrow, elongated body. It shares this specific epithet with multiple other species, such as Hemiodus gracilis and Pseudanos gracilis.

In terms of a common name, B. gracilis is sometimes called the "lambari", but this is a name that also applies to other small species of fish in nearby regions. These fish include Astyanax altiparanae, Bryconamericus lambari, and Deuterodon iguape. Otherwise, B. gracilis has no accepted common name.

== Distribution and conservation ==
Bryconops gracilis is native to Brazil, found only in the Tapajos river basin. Three of its congeners have also been described therein: B. durbinae, B. munduruku, and B. transitoria.

Though B. gracilis is currently listed as least concern by the International Union for the Conservation of Nature (IUCN), the Tapajos river is under constant threat of human impact. The water is sometimes so full of sediments kicked up by illegal mining that entire portions of the river turn entirely brown. Factors like this place B. gracilis, as well as other species endemic to the area, under greater survival pressure.
