= Bryconops disruptus =

Conservation status
- Least Concern (IUCN 3.1)

Scientific classification
- Kingdom: Animalia
- Phylum: Chordata
- Class: Actinopterygii
- Order: Characiformes
- Family: Iguanodectidae
- Genus: Bryconops
- Species: B. disruptus

Binomial name
- Bryconops disruptus Chernoff & Machado-Allison, 1997

Species of fish

Bryconops disruptus is a small freshwater fish of the family Iguanodectidae. It is only found in the Rio Negro in South America. Like the rest of the genus Bryconops, B. disruptus is silvery in color, with a relatively deep chest and a notable set of teeth. The specific epithet "disruptus" refers to the incomplete lateral line.

== Description ==
Bryconops disruptus is one of the smallest members of Bryconops, measuring about 6.4 cm (2.5 in) in standard length. The only species smaller is Bryconops durbinae, which reaches 3.1 cm (1.2 in) in standard length. It is similar in coloration to Bryconops caudomaculatus, including a similar caudal ocellus (an eyespot on the tail fin), but is overall a darker silver and has a more consistently incomplete lateral line. The number of pored lateral line scales varies wildly, ranging from 9 to 23.

Due to the presence of a caudal ocellus, B. disruptus bears an outward resemblance to B. caudomaculatus, and its small size and general shape make it reminiscent of B. durbinae. However, it can be told apart by various factors; these include fewer precaudal vertebrae (16 in B. disruptus versus 17–18 in B. caudomaculatus) and the lack of a caudal ocellus in B. durbinae.

== Taxonomy ==
Bryconops disruptus has been identified as a member of the genus Bryconops since its description in February 1997. Originally, the genus Bryconops was considered a member of the family Characidae, but research in 2011 prompted a move into the family Iguanodectidae, alongside the genera Piabucus and Iguanodectes. B. disruptus is currently classified as an iguanodectid.

Bryconops caudomaculatus, a closely related congener, is at the center of an informal species complex that formed around a history of mistaken identity or synonymy. B. disruptus is a part of this species complex, having drawn multiple comparisons to B. caudomaculatus in its original description.

The specific epithet "disruptus" is in reference to the lateral line, which is regularly incomplete or interrupted. B. disruptus has no accepted common names.

== Habitat and ecology ==
Bryconops disruptus solely inhabits the Rio Negro, a blackwater tributary of the Amazon river. The Rio Negro has very low mineral content, and is very acidic, with a pH ranging from 2.9 to 4.2. The riverbed is stable, with low erosion and very few suspended particulates in the water, and the flora and fauna are generally sparse outside of species like B. disruptus.

Blackwater habitats generally have low oxygen content, which shows that B. disruptus does not need well-oxygenated waters to survive. This is because blackwater conditions are caused by the decay of plant matter leaching tannins into the water, and the microbial activity responsible for said decay consumes a great deal of the available dissolved oxygen.

Bryconops disruptus's preference for acidic and/or blackwater environments is something it shares with more than a few of its congeners. One of these is Bryconops collettei, which is found both in more acidic blackwaters and rather less acidic clear waters. Another example is Bryconops colaroja, which inhabits waters in the Guiana Shield that lean towards acidity.

=== Conservation status ===
The Rio Negro is the world's largest blackwater river, which means that B. disruptus has a wide native range.
