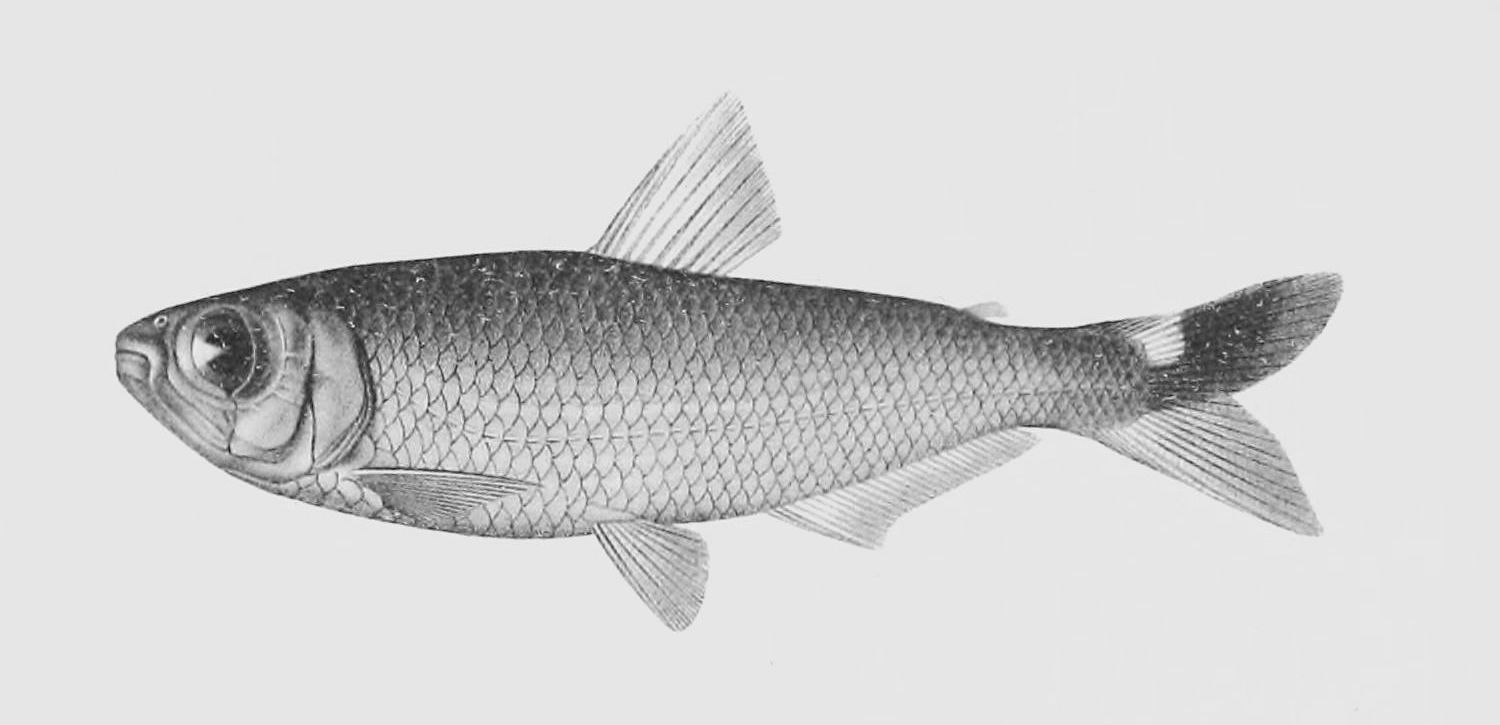
- 1915 illustration

Scientific classification
- Kingdom: Animalia
- Phylum: Chordata
- Class: Actinopterygii
- Division: Teleostei
- Order: Characiformes
- Family: Iguanodectidae
- Genus: Bryconops
- Species: B. transitoria

Binomial name
- Bryconops transitoria (Steindachner, 1915)

Synonyms
- Creatochanes melanurus var. transitoria Steindachner, 1915

= Bryconops transitoria =

Species of fish

Bryconops transitoria is a species of freshwater ray-finned fish belonging to the family Iguanodectidae. This species is found in South America. It is a poorly-studied member of the genus Bryconops with few records and vague distribution accounts, though it is believed to be endemic to the Rio Tapajós. It was originally thought to be a subspecies of congener Bryconops melanurus, but is now accepted as its own species.

== Description ==
Bryconops transitoria reaches a maximum of roughly 7.0 cm (2.8 in), which places it slightly to the smaller side of the genus Bryconops. It is a silver-colored fish with a darker back and a generally slender body, as is not uncommon with Bryconops as a whole. Otherwise, it is poorly documented, which leads to a lack of distinct physical records.

Congener B. melanurus has noted morphological similarities with B. transitoria, but can be differentiated based on morphometric specifics and differences in fin structure; for instance, B. transitoria has 23-27 anal-fin rays, whereas B. melanurus has 28–29. Nonetheless, these differences are generally minor.

== Taxonomy ==
When first described by Austrian zoologist Franz Steindachner, B. transitoria was listed as a subspecies of Bryconops melanurus, at the time referred to as Creatochanes melanurus var. transitoria. This was corrected in a list by Lima et al. in 2003, in which it was recognized as Bryconops transitoria, a standalone species. The genus Creatochanes has been synonymized with Bryconops and is now considered a subgenus, to which B. transitoria belongs.

Some authorities believe that the validity of B. transitoria as a species needs investigation given its similarity to B. melanurus and its sparse collection records. Said records are known to be vague, and the species itself not particularly well-studied. The syntypes (original collection of specimens upon which a new species description is based) were re-evaluated in 2018, and found to be composed of three different species (one of which was a member of Iguanodectes, a related but separate genus).

Bryconops as a genus was once considered a member of the family Characidae, but research in 2011 prompted that it be moved to a new family, Iguanodectidae. It was placed there alongside the genera Piabucus and Iguanodectes, but while those two make up the subfamily Iguanodectinae, Bryconops is a solitary clade. Today, B. transitoria is considered an iguanodectid rather than a characin.

=== Etymology ===
The specific epithet "transitoria" is feminine in Latin. When paired with the Latin "varietas" (signifying a variant of a species), which is also feminine, "transitoria" would be the correct word to use; this was B. transitoria's original placement, when described by Steindachner (as Creatochanes melanurus var. transitoria). However, there has been at least one proposition to change the species name to "transitorius", as "Bryconops" and "Creatochanes" are both considered masculine, and convention states that the names match in the context of linguistic gender.

The specific epithet "transitoria" means "in transition", referring to the fact that B. transitoria was originally speculated to represent a highly-variable subspecies of B. melanurus. In terms of a common name, B. transitoria is one of several members of Bryconops sometimes referred to as "lambari".

== Habitat and ecology ==
Bryconops transitoria is largely considered endemic to the Tapajós basin. More specific preferences include a leaning towards clearwater habitats, as opposed to whitewater or blackwater. However, B. transitoria is also poorly-studied, with unclear distribution records dating back to its discovery. B. transitoria is one of four Bryconops species to be described from the Tapajós; The others are Bryconops gracilis, B. munduruku, and B. durbinae.

While B. transitoria has not been the subject of specific dietary study, it is likely to be an insectivore or omnivore, based on behavior seen in other members of the genus.

=== Conservation status ===
Bryconops transitoria specifically has not been evaluated by the IUCN. However, its natural habitat in the Tapajós basin is known to be facing various anthropogenic threats; other species of Bryconops are under similar survival pressure.

The Río Tapajos main is a site of frequent consideration for infrastructure and mining developments. This is only from a legal standpoint, however - illegally, there have been instances of unlawful mining kicking up enough sediment to turn the waters of the Tapajós brown. The illegal gold mining industry is a thriving market in Latin America, despite its inherent danger to both participants and the environment. Species like B. transitoria are among potential casualties of activity along such lines.

The Tapajós is of such ecological and infrastructural importance that various projects have been reconsidered, specifically taking environmental impact into consideration. Therefore, B. transitoria (and the other Tapajós-endemic species) have a greater chance of survival.
