= Iguanodectes polylepis =

Conservation status
- Data Deficient (IUCN 3.1)

Scientific classification
- Kingdom: Animalia
- Phylum: Chordata
- Class: Actinopterygii
- Order: Characiformes
- Family: Iguanodectidae
- Genus: Iguanodectes
- Species: I. polylepis

Binomial name
- Iguanodectes polylepis Géry, 1993

Species of fish

Iguanodectes polylepis is a species of freshwater ray-finned fish belonging to the family Iguanodectidae. This species is endemic to Brazil, where it inhabits the Madeira and Purus river basins. It is one of the larger members of the genus, but remains generally small, only a little over a quarter-foot long.

Iguanodectes polylepis was named in the same paper that named congeners I. gracilis and I. variatus. None of the three species are particularly well-studied, though I. variatus is more well-known than the other two due to its presence in aquaria, albeit sparse.

== Description ==
Iguanodectes polylepis is a small fish, measuring a maximum of 8.4 cm (3.3 in) standard length (SL). Nonetheless, it is somewhat large for a species of Iguanodectes, and has the greatest number of lateral line scales therein, 76–81. It is narrow-bodied and slender, as with all Iguanodectes, and lacks the prominent chest keel seen in sister genus Piabucus.

Iguanodectes polylepis, as in all Iguanodectes, has a base scale color that ranges from yellow to silver-yellow, and is most similar in coloration to congener Iguanodectes variatus. It has a patch of pigmentation on its caudal fin that occupies a great deal of the junction between lobes, and its lateral stripe is generally dark, with a pinkish band on top. However, it differs from I. variatus in that the snout is not dark, and it has no irregular spots of the kind that give I. variatus its name. Some specimens of I. polylepis bear a patch of orange near the caudal peduncle, and/or an orange dorsal fin. There is no humeral mark.

== Taxonomy ==
Iguanodectes polylepis has no known synonyms. It is one of the more recent additions to the genus, named in 1993, and is one of three species described in its nominal paper; the other two are Iguanodectes variatus and Iguanodectes gracilis. I. polylepis, as with the rest of Iguanodectes, was once considered a member of the family Characidae, but research in 2011 prompted a move to a new family, Iguanodectidae.

=== Etymology ===
The specific epithet "polylepis" means "many-scaled"; "poly" means "multiple", and "lepis" means "scale" (compare Lepidoptera, "scale wing"). This is in reference to its high number of lateral-line scales, the highest in the genus.

Iguanodectes polylepis lacks a common name accepted by the scientific community.

== Distribution and ecology ==
Iguanodectes polylepis is found in the Madeira and Purus river basins in Brazil. It is more well known from the Purus, and was originally thought to be endemic to the basin. The type locality is a tributary of the Rio Ipixuna, specifically a point located to the west of the city Hamaitá, in Amazonas, Brazil.

Little is known of the diet and ecological interactions of I. polylepis. Other members of the genus are usually herbivorous, some with omnivorous traits observed in captivity, and it is likely that I. polylepis displays similar habits, especially given its native range. The Purus and Maderia basins are dense with wetlands and flooded forests, establishing plentiful riparian vegetation upon which native fish species can feed.

== Conservation status ==
Iguanodectes polylepis has not been evaluated by the IUCN. It has little presence in aquaria; this is in opposition to congeners known in the industry, such as I. adujai and I. geisleri. Iguanodectes is a genus not often imported for trade. Overall, the wide range and the lack of interest in wild-caught specimens of I. polylepis speaks to a generally stable population.

Nonetheless, environmental hazards, especially anthropogenic ones, are an ongoing concern for many aquatic South American species. Threats to the Maderia basin, specifically, include infrastructure development such as hydroelectric dams. The Purus is more threatened by deforestation and agricultural development. Rivers surrounded by farmland are noted to have decreased water quality, including factors like contamination from pesticides and animal feces.
