= Iguanodectes gracilis =

Conservation status
- Least Concern (IUCN 3.1)

Scientific classification
- Kingdom: Animalia
- Phylum: Chordata
- Class: Actinopterygii
- Order: Characiformes
- Family: Iguanodectidae
- Genus: Iguanodectes
- Species: I. gracilis

Binomial name
- Iguanodectes gracilis Géry, 1993

Species of fish

Iguanodectes gracilis is a species of freshwater ray-finned fish belonging to the family Iguanodectidae. This species is found in South America where it is known solely from the Rio Negro river system, i.e. it is endemic to Brazil. The name "gracilis" is in reference to a slender body shape, alongside the diminutive nature of I. gracilis - it is the smallest member of the genus Iguanodectes.

Granted species status in 1993, I. gracilis is one of the more recent additions to the genus Iguanodectes. The publication that described it also described congeners I. variatus and I. polylepis, both of which are generally more well-studied.

== Description ==
Iguanodectes gracilis is a small species, reaching a maximum of 4.6 cm (1.8 in) standard length (SL). As with all Iguanodectinae, I. gracilis has a compressed, elongate body, comparable to the general shape of a smelt or minnow. When compared to congeners, however, it is slightly more slender, and is the smallest of the genus. (The largest is Iguanodectes variatus, which reaches 10.3 cm (4.1 in) SL.)

Iguanodectes gracilis bears the greatest resemblance to congener I. adujai, with generally similar coloration aside from the fins; this includes a prominent lateral stripe on a yellowish base body color. (In all Iguanodectes, the lateral line is complete.) The fins are largely hyaline, lacking any marking aside from dark pigmentation in the median caudal rays and some scattered chromatophores (color cells) on the base of the anal fin. This is unusual in Iguanodectes, and can be used to tell it apart from several congeners.

All members of the family Iguanodectidae, are equipped with multicuspid teeth.. Iguanodectes as a genus is also generally shallow-chested, lacking the pectoral keel seen in sister genus Piabucus, but I. gracilis specifically is somewhat deep-bodied for an iguanodectid.

== Taxonomy ==
Iguanodectes gracilis has retained its original name since designation in 1993. However, it went from a member of family Characidae to family Iguanodectidae upon research in 2011 that prompted this change for the genera Iguanodectes, Piabucus, and Bryconops. Iguanodectes and Piabucus make up subfamily Iguanodectinae, while Bryconops makes up a monotypic clade.

Iguanodectes gracilis was first described in the same study that named Iguanodectes variatus. (This was a simultaneous publication of the smallest and largest members of the genus, respectively.) This same paper also named Iguanodectes polylepis.

=== Etymology ===
The specific epithet "gracilis" means "slender" (compare the word "graceful"). This refers to the slender shape and small size of I. gracilis. The generic name "iguanodectes" likely comes from "iguana", the lizard, and "dectes", meaning "bite" or "tooth". (The meaning was not made clear in the original text.)

== Distribution and habitat ==
Iguanodectes gracilis is known from the Rio Negro basin. This is the only habitat from which it has been cited, and it is suspected to be restricted to the region. It has largely been observed in tributaries to the river main.

The Rio Negro itself is a blackwater river, which is a slow-moving, acidic river rich in microbial activity. Said activity breaks down abundant leaf litter provided by thick riparian vegetation, which releases humic substances into the water, staining it brown. Microbial activity, therefore, consumes much of the available dissolved oxygen in blackwater rivers. I. gracilis is not negatively affected by the resultant low oxygen levels.

== Diet and ecology ==
Species-specific research on the diet and environmental interaction of I. gracilis is lacking. Patterns seen in the rest of the genus indicate that I. gracilis is most likely herbivorous, perhaps with some omnivorous traits like I. geisleri and I. adujai. One known instance of sympatry is with Potamorrhaphis guianensis, the freshwater needlefish.

=== Presence and behavior in aquaria ===
There is little knowledge of I. gracilis in captivity. Nonetheless, it has been approved by the Brazilian government for export from the country. It is furthermore acknowledged by MERCOSUR Common Nomenclature (MCN), which is a system responsible for maintaining records of known names for various exports.

== Conservation status ==
Iguanodectes gracilis has not been evaluated by the IUCN. Nonetheless, it inhabits wetlands in the Rio Negro basin that are under pressure from anthropogenic sources, like illegal mining and infrastructure development. Such wetlands are known for their ecological fragility, and wetland conservation efforts are frequent.
