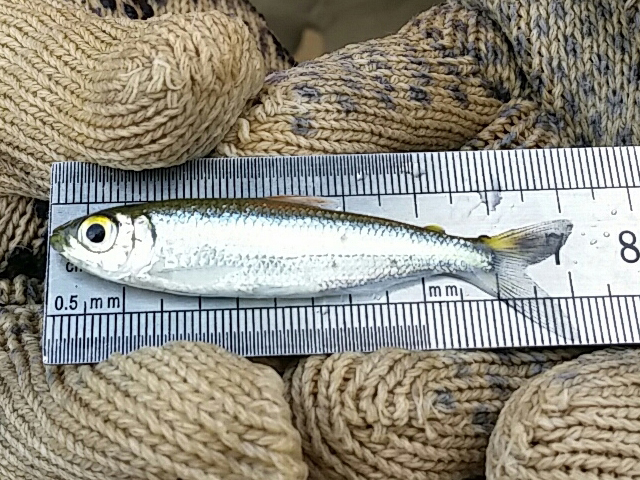

Conservation status
- Least Concern (IUCN 3.1)

Scientific classification
- Kingdom: Animalia
- Phylum: Chordata
- Class: Actinopterygii
- Order: Characiformes
- Family: Iguanodectidae
- Genus: Bryconops
- Species: B. alburnoides

Binomial name
- Bryconops alburnoides Kner, 1858

Synonyms
- Bryconops lucidus Kner, 1858

= Bryconops alburnoides =

Species of fish

Bryconops alburnoides is a small species of freshwater ray-finned fish belonging to the family Iguanodectidae. This fish is found in the rivers of South America. It has a slender body, with a yellowish dorsal fin and yellow-tinged back scales that fade into silver on its belly. It is largely an insectivore that picks land-dwelling insects from the riverbanks, though it eats much more whenever rain washes prey into the water.

== Description ==
Bryconops alburnoides reaches 15 cm (5.9 inches) at a maximum in standard length (tail fin not included), with a generally elongated body. The genus Bryconops as a whole has been described as slender-bodied and "smelt-like", similar to sister genus Piabucus; B. alburnoides is no exception. B. alburnoides is one of the larger members of the genus by a considerable margin.

The lateral line has 50 to 62 scales. B. alburnoides has a yellowish dorsal fin, which is a feature that can be used to distinguish it from other members of the genus that look similar. The upper and lower margins of the caudal fin are also tinted yellow. A congener, Bryconops gracilis, has frequently been misidentified as B. alburnoides, thanks to a yellowish dorsal fin and a similar number of lateral-line scales. However, B. alburnoides has three rows of premaxillary teeth, while B. gracilis only has two, making for a definitive way to tell the two apart.

== Taxonomy ==
Upon describing Bryconops alburnoides in 1858, Austrian ichthyologist Rudolf Kner established Bryconops as a new genus. He also described a congener, B. lucidus, but this has since been synonymized with B. alburnoides. As a result, B. alburnoides is the type species of the genus. Bryconops lucidus is the only synonym of Bryconops alburnoides.

When originally described, the genus Bryconops was placed in the family Characidae. Research from Oliveira et al. prompted Bryconops, along with sister genera Piabucus and Iguanodectes, to be moved to the family Iguanodectidae in 2011, which was revived from the work of ichthyologist Carl H. Eigenmann. Therefore, B. alburnoides is a characiform fish of the family Iguanodectidae.

Bryconops has long known to be related to Brycon, Tetragonopterus, and Chalceus, which are its most closely related characiform genera. Within the genus Bryconops, B. alburnoides is isolated from the subgenus Creatochanes and from the Bryconops caudomaculatus species complex; it is not considered a member of Creatochanes, and there are six members of the subgenus Bryconops, five of which are part of the aforementioned complex. B. alburnoides is the sole remainder.

== Etymology ==
Many members of the genus Bryconops draw comparisons to other taxa, but B. alburnoides in particular bears a resemblance to members of the cyprinid genus Alburnus. This, in fact, is the origin of its specific epithet; the suffix "–oides" means "with the form of" or "resembling", hence alburnoides.

The genus name Bryconops in itself is a reference to another taxon - Brycon is a genus of characins that also lives in South America. Therefore, B. alburnoides' full scientific name means "resembling Brycon and Alburnus". The name Brycon originates in Greek, and comes from the word "bryko", which means "to bite" or "to eat". This is in reference to the notable set of teeth that all members of the genus are equipped with.

The name alburnoides is also used for the genus Alburnoides, consisting of cyprinid fishes that inhabit Europe and Asia. Outside of similar nomenclature, Alburnoides is entirely unrelated to B. alburnoides.

== Habitat and ecology ==
Like the rest of the genus Bryconops, B. alburnoides is found solely in South American freshwater habitats. It is local to the Amazon and Orinoco river basins, as well as flood-plain lakes in the lower Orinoco region.

Bryconops alburnoides is an insectivore, demonstrating a marked preference for terrestrial insects. Its consumption increases opportunistically with windy and rainy weather, which sweeps more prey into its aquatic habitat. This is in line with other members of the genus, all of which have a diet that consists at least partially of insects.
