= Bryconops durbini =

Conservation status
- Data Deficient (IUCN 3.1)

Scientific classification
- Kingdom: Animalia
- Phylum: Chordata
- Class: Actinopterygii
- Order: Characiformes
- Family: Iguanodectidae
- Genus: Bryconops
- Species: B. durbini

Binomial name
- Bryconops durbini (C. H. Eigenmann, 1908)

Synonyms
- Brycochandus durbini C. H. Eigenmann, 1908

Species of fish

Bryconops durbini, sometimes listed under the name Bryconops durbinae, is a small species of freshwater fish in the family Iguanodectidae. It is the smallest species of the genus Bryconops, and is endemic to the Tapajós river basin in Brazil.

== Description ==
Bryconops durbini is small and slender, with a large mouth in comparison to the body. It is the smallest member of the genus Bryconops at 3.1 cm (1.2 in) in standard length; the second-smallest is Bryconops disruptus, at 6.4 cm (2.5 in). Its fins are generally hyaline (transparent), though it does bear a caudal ocellus (eyespot on the tail) that is transparent when preserved in alcohol, but ranges from red to yellow in life. Its caudal fin is darker than the rest, which makes said ocellus more obvious upon examination.

In terms of body coloration, Bryconops durbini is generally an iridescent silver, with a black lateral stripe down each side underlined by a silver stripe. The lateral line, however, is regularly incomplete; this is a similarity it shares with congener Bryconops disruptus. They are relatively easy to tell apart because the lateral line of B. disruptus has fewer pored scales, ranging wildly from 9 to 23, whereas B. durbini has around 30 pored lateral line scales at a minimum.

Reportedly, the small size and incomplete lateral line give Bryconops durbini an incredibly similar appearance to the juveniles of congener Bryconops caudomaculatus. One of the only ways to tell the two apart is that juvenile specimens of B. caudomaculatus have not developed teeth on their maxillaries. This is in contrast to adult specimens of B. durbini, which have maxillaries equipped with at least two teeth on each side, the outer set multicuspid and the inner set conical.

== Taxonomy ==
When first described by German-American ichthyologist Carl H. Eigenmann in 1908, Bryconops durbini was named Brycochandus durbini. This established Brycochandus as a monotypic genus, but Brycochandus was later synonymized with Bryconops. Knöppel et al. noted B. durbini's similarity to members of the genus Creatochanes, which was also later synonymized with Bryconops (though now accepted as a subgenus).

There are two subgenera in the genus Bryconops, Bryconops and Creatochanes. Bryconops durbini is one of eight species that belong to the subgenus Bryconops, making its full scientific name Bryconops (Bryconops) durbinae. Other members are species that all share notable visual similarities, including B. caudomaculatus and B. disruptus (both mentioned prior).

Prior to 2011, Bryconops was considered a member of the family Characidae, but research in said year moved it to the family Iguanodectidae, along with the genera Piabucus and Iguanodectes.

=== Etymology ===
Though Bryconops durbini is listed under B. durbinae by many authorities, and is referred to as such in most modern publications, it is also easily found under the name Bryconops durbini, a spelling that more closely resembles its basionym. The origin of the specific epithet in question is limnologist and environmental toxicologist Marion Durbin Ellis, a student of Eigenmann's. B. durbini lacks an accepted common name, but "Durbin's tetra" has been suggested as an etymological result of the specific epithet.

== Habitat and ecology ==
Bryconops durbini is known only from the Rio Tapajos in Brazil. This has been the case since it was described. The Rio Tapajos is a somewhat acidic clearwater river, with a pH that ranges from 4.5 to 7.8. Most of the time, the water carries very little sediment.

This preference for an acidic environment is something shared with various members of the genus Bryconops, but several of them - like B. caudomaculatus, B. disruptus, and B. colaroja - are found in blackwater rather than clearwater habitats. Bryconops collettei is a congener that inhabits both black and clear waters.

=== Conservation status ===
Bryconops durbini has been evaluated by the IUCN Red List as "Data Deficient". Nonetheless, it faces threats to its population, mostly in the form of human activity and environmental destruction (which is also the case for the species of Bryconops that have been evaluated).

The Rio Tapajos has long been considered for possible infrastructure development and mining operations, and there have been instances of illegal mining disturbing enough sediment to turn the water completely brown. The region is of great importance to not only ecological biodiversity but also to a population of roughly 1.4 million people, including various indigenous tribes, and so legal plans and operations have been reconsidered in the context of having as little impact on the region as possible. Therefore, Bryconops durbini (alongside the other Tapajos-endemic species) has a greater chance for survival.
