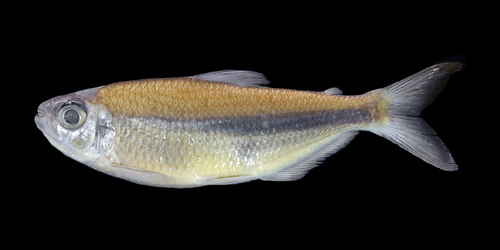
- Preserved specimen

Conservation status
- Least Concern (IUCN 3.1)

Scientific classification
- Kingdom: Animalia
- Phylum: Chordata
- Class: Actinopterygii
- Order: Characiformes
- Family: Iguanodectidae
- Genus: Bryconops
- Species: B. colaroja

Binomial name
- Bryconops colaroja Chernoff & Machado-Allison, 1999

= Bryconops colaroja =

Species of fish

Bryconops colaroja is a small species of freshwater ray-finned fish belonging to the family Iguanodectidae. This fish is endemic to tributaries and creeks of the Cuyuni River basin in Venezuela. The specific epithet "colaroja" means "red tailed", and it gets this name from its most distinctive feature - a deep red caudal fin, largely unique amongst members of its genus.

== Description ==
Bryconops colaroja is one of the smaller members of the genus Bryconops, measuring around 7.8 cm (3.1 in) in standard length. In general, the genus Bryconops has a similar body shape to sister genus Piabucus, described as resembling a minnow or smelt. Its scales are mostly greenish-silver, slightly darker on the back than on the rest of the body. The uniform gradient of the scales, lacking prominent markings, is a feature that can be used to differentiate it from other members of the genus; for example, B. colanegra and B. melanurus have distinct blotches of pigmentation in the cheek and eye region.

Bryconops colaroja is the only member of the genus Bryconops to have a caudal fin that is completely red, aside from congener Bryconops imitator (which gets its name from its similarity to B. colaroja). The margins of the fin rays are the only places where melanophores are present, making dark lines radiate inwards from the fin margin. This distinct color is the origin of the fish's scientific name; "cola" means "tail", and "roja" means "red". It is sometimes called the redtailed bryconops because of this, but this is not in wide use, and B. colaroja has no accepted common name.

Though Bryconops colaroja has gill rakers that are notably denticulated - that is, adorned with toothlike protrusions - its congener B. colanegra is known to have gill rakers with higher denticulation. The teeth are multicuspid, which is a feature that the Bryconops clade shares with sister clade Iguanodectinae.

== Taxonomy ==
Bryconops colaroja was described in 1999 as a part of the subgenus Creatochanes, making its full name Bryconops (Creatochanes) colaroja. It has no synonyms, nor is it often mistaken for its congeners, aside from B. imitator. The red tail makes it fairly easy to identify.

Bryconops colaroja, as with all members of the genus Bryconops, was once considered a part of the family Characidae, and is still listed there by some sources. However, research in 2011 by Oliveira et al. moved the genera Bryconops, Iguanodectes, and Piabucus to the family Iguanodectidae, which is where B. colaroja currently stands.

== Habitat and ecology ==
Bryconops colaroja is known only from the Cuyuní river basin, leaning on the border between Venezuela and Guyana; however, it has not been collected from the Cuyuni river main, only smaller creeks and tributaries. It demonstrates a preference for slightly acidic waters, as well as a rocky or sandy substrate.

The blackwater nature of B. colaroja's habitat indicates that it does not need well-oxygenated waters to survive. Part of what characterizes a blackwater river is a high concentration of humic substances, which are the result of microbial activity. This microbial activity consumes much of the oxygen in the water, and as such fish with high-oxygen needs are not suited for blackwater environments.

=== Diet ===
The diet of Bryconops colaroja hasn't been the subject of extensive study on its own, but other members of the genus are known to be largely insectivorous, and have noted preferences for invertebrates of various origins. The orangefin tetra (B. affinis) makes plants a more prominent part of its diet, though it still eats invertebrates. The tailspot tetra (B. caudomaculatus) jumps out of the water to catch flying insects, and B. alburnoides demonstrates a taste for terrestrial insects. Based on the most current information, B. colaroja can reasonably be assumed to be an insectivore that takes supplemental plant material.

== Conservation status ==
Though little is known of B. colaroja's population trends, it is considered a species of least concern by the IUCN. A potential threat is that the Cuyuni River main is regularly threatened by mining activity; the waters have been disturbed and riverbanks destroyed in the past, as it is a source of gold. The Cuyuni river is generally in poor health, which places B. colaroja (as well as the other native species) at an increased risk of endangerment. However, its presence has been noted by mining operations in the past, which in turn has increased their willingness to take precautions to protect it.
