= Bryconops colanegra =

Conservation status
- Least Concern (IUCN 3.1)

Scientific classification
- Kingdom: Animalia
- Phylum: Chordata
- Class: Actinopterygii
- Order: Characiformes
- Family: Iguanodectidae
- Genus: Bryconops
- Species: B. colanegra

Binomial name
- Bryconops colanegra Chernoff & Machado-Allison, 1999

Species of fish

Bryconops colanegra s a small species of freshwater ray-finned fish belonging to the family Iguanodectidae. This fish is found in South America, where it is endemic to a single river system in Venezuela, the Rio Caroní. It is about 8.8 cm (3.5 in) long. It has a black tail fin that bears hints of red, and its scales are dark along the back, transitioning to a silver belly.

== Description ==
Bryconops colanegra is one of the smaller members of the genus Bryconops, at 8.8 cm (3.5 in) standard length. It has dark back scales that fade to a silvery belly, aside from a patch in the opercular and cheek region that bears definite pigmentation (something that also appears in congener B. melanurus). The anal fin has a broad band of black along the base, which is a feature that B. colanegra does not share with any other members of the genus.

The distinct black caudal fin that Bryconops colanegra has is the origin of its scientific name: cola means "tail", and negra means "black". This is one way to differentiate it from several congeners. B. colaroja, for example, has a red caudal fin, and the tailspot tetra (B. caudomaculatus) has a large, distinct spot on its tail. Though its pigmentation is its main feature, there is usually a hint of red in the caudal fin nonetheless.

The teeth are multicuspid, and the fish is equipped with a set of gill rakers that are notably denticulated - that is, covered in tooth-like protrusions. The higher denticulation level is in contrast with congener B. colaroja, whose gill rakers have fewer protrusions. Multicuspid teeth are a feature that the genus Bryconops shares with sister clade Iguanodectinae.

== Taxonomy ==
Described in 1999, Bryconops colanegra belongs to the subgenus Creatochanes, making its full scientific name Bryconops (Creatochanes) colanegra. In the same study that elevated it to species status, its congener B. colaroja was also named. Though it has a scientific name that means "black tail", B. colanegra does not have an accepted common name. The name "black-tailed tetra" has been suggested.

Bryconops colanegra used to be considered a characin, or a member of the family Characidae. However, research in 2011 prompted that the genus Bryconops, along with the genera Iguanodectes and Piabucus, be moved to the family Iguanodectidae. Subsequently, B. colanegra's current accepted classification is as an Iguanodectid fish. It remains a member of the order Characiformes.

== Habitat and ecology ==
Bryconops colanegra is found largely in the Caroní River, which stretches across Venezuela (not to be confused with the Caroni River in Trinidad and Tobago). The Caroní, as a blackwater river, has a high concentration of humic substances. Because microbial activity is what causes blackwater conditions, blackwater rivers are poorly oxygenated (with microbes taking up whatever oxygen they can), indicating that B. colanegra does not need oxygen-rich water to survive.

=== Conservation status ===
Because the Caroní River is facing construction of several hydroelectric dams and already provides 70% of Venezuela's hydroelectric power, the ecology of the region faces repercussions, possibly severe. The local ecosystems are also threatened by current mining projects, various types of which have been occurring in the region since the 1990s. As it currently stands, however, B. colanegra is considered a species of least concern on the IUCN Red List, based upon a wide native range - the Caroní is the longest single river in Venezuela.

Bryconops colanegra is known to be taken from the wild for the aquarium industry. Its trade is not restricted nor blocked in any country, and it is not in widespread use as a captive animal. Capture from the wild is also not considered a threat to its population numbers; its greatest threat is perhaps habitat disruption by way of human activity. This is something it shares with other members of the genus that have been evaluated.

=== Diet ===
Though little of B. colanegra's diet specifically has been studied, other members of the genus are known to be insectivorous, displaying differing preferences for invertebrates from various habitats. For example, the tailspot tetra (B. caudomaculatus) is known to jump out of the water to catch flying insects, while B. alburnoides demonstrates a taste for terrestrial insects. The orangefin tetra, B. affinis, makes plants a more prominent part of its diet. It can reasonably be assumed that B. colanegra's diet is similar to those of its congeners.
