= Bryconops imitator =

Conservation status
- Near Threatened (IUCN 3.1)

Scientific classification
- Kingdom: Animalia
- Phylum: Chordata
- Class: Actinopterygii
- Order: Characiformes
- Family: Iguanodectidae
- Genus: Bryconops
- Species: B. imitator

Binomial name
- Bryconops imitator Chernoff & Machado-Allison, 2002

Species of fish

Bryconops imitator is a species of freshwater ray-finned fish belonging to the family Iguanodectidae. This species is found in the rivers of South America. It is a small, silvery fish with a bright red tail fin that is known to eat invertebrates, like insects and freshwater zooplankton.

It gets the specific epithet "imitator" from its strong resemblance to another member of the genus, Bryconops colaroja; however, there are subtle differences in bone structure, color, and other traits that allow for differentiation. B. imitator and B. colaroja otherwise share many visual similarities that make them easy to confuse.

== Description ==
Bryconops imitator usually reaches 7.8 cm (3.1 in) in standard length. This places it close to the middle of the length range for Bryconops as a whole. Its scales are generally silver with a hint of emerald-green, and one of its most distinguishing features is a bright-red tail, a trait it only shares with B. colaroja (which was named for its tail; cola- means tail and -roja means red). The fact that B. imitator and B. colaroja are the only two members of Bryconops - and, in fact, two of very few tetras in general - to have this specific trait is one of the reasons that B. imitator went unrecognized as long as it did.

Even upon a relatively close inspection, B. imitator is easy to confuse with B. colaroja, but several differentiating facets exist. These involve features as subtle as where scales form new rows on the body; the rows of B. imitator's scales split at the seventh scale in the mid-dorsal scale row, but the rows of B. colaroja's scales split after the 5th and the 8th scale. Differences in body shape are easier to see. B. imitator has a slightly more arched predorsal region, and a thinner caudal peduncle (the joint where the tail fin attaches to the body).

Bryconops imitator has several differences in coloration that set it apart from other related species, not just B. colaroja. It lacks a humeral spot, a mark above the pectoral fin in some fish (including many Bryconops), and has no increase in pigmentation in the eye and cheek region. The lobes of its caudal (tail) fin are equal in length, and it lacks the caudal ocellus (eyespot) seen in plenty of its congeners. It also has no band of pigment at the base of its anal fin, and this specifically differentiates it from B. colanegra, which has an exaggerated stripe on its anal fin base.

== Taxonomy ==
Bryconops imitator has been considered a member of Bryconops since its designation in 2002 by Chernoff & Machado-Allison. Bryconops consists of two subgenera, Bryconops and Creatochanes, and B. imitator is considered a member of Creatochanes; hence, its full scientific name is Bryconops (Creatochanes) imitator. Members of Creatochanes are classified based upon having at least one tooth, up to three, in both sides of the maxillary bone.

While this cannot be quantified from external observation alone, the denticulation of the gill rakers (how many denticles, or toothlike protrusions, the gill rakers have) can also play a part in classification. B. imitator's gill rakers, while perhaps the least denticulated amongst comparable species, still bear the right similarities to place it in a clade within its subgenus; this clade consists of Bryconops melanurus|B. melanurus, B. colaroja, B. colanegra, and B. imitator.

== Distribution and ecology ==
Bryconops imitator is endemic to the Caura River, a blackwater tributary of the Orinoco river. It has a noted preference for sandy substrate (as opposed to rocky or clay-heavy). It demonstrates similar environmental needs to its cousin B. colaroja, which contributed to their longtime synonymy, but B. colaroja is endemic to an entirely different tributary of a different river altogether (the Cuyuní river, which is a tributary of the Essequibo river).

Though detailed research on its specific preferences is lacking, B. imitator is known to target invertebrates. The presence of gill rakers suggests that microscopic invertebrates are included, and the Caura River is not lacking. There is a plentiful population of zooplankton that rises and falls with the yearly flood cycle, though these zooplankton do not reproduce in the river itself and are instead solely washed in from the floodplains or other channels.

=== Conservation status ===
The IUCN considers B. imitator to be a near-threatened species largely thanks to habitat loss and degradation. Illegal gold mining is a thriving industry in Latin America as a whole, and the activities therein are damaging and endangering many habitats, not just aquatic. Specific threats include mercury toxicity, which is dangerous not just to inhabitants like B. imitator but also to the human communities that rely on the river systems for water.
