= Iguanodectes spilurus =

Conservation status
- Least Concern (IUCN 3.1)

Scientific classification
- Kingdom: Animalia
- Phylum: Chordata
- Class: Actinopterygii
- Order: Characiformes
- Family: Iguanodectidae
- Genus: Iguanodectes
- Species: I. spilurus

Binomial name
- Iguanodectes spilurus (Günther, 1864)

Synonyms
- Piabuca spilurus Günther, 1864; Iguanodectes tenuis Cope, 1872

Species of fish

Iguanodectes spilurus, the green-line lizard tetra, sometimes referred to in retail stores as the slender tetra, is a small characiform fish from the rivers of South America. It is not a well-studied species, but research is available, including data from hobbyists who keep it as an ornamental fish. It has a distinct lateral stripe of reflective-green scales, and lacks any red markings therein; red is common in congeners' lateral stripes (and is thus a differentiating feature).

For a time, researchers had uncertainties regarding the taxonomic status of I. spilurus. It was originally named as a member of sister genus Piabucus, and then was described with the name I. tenuis. However, its modern placement as a member of Iguanodectes with specific name spilurus is generally accepted by the scientific community.

== Description ==
Iguanodectes spilurus is a small fish, reaching a maximum of 10.2 cm (4.0 in) in standard length (SL). Based on hobbyist reports, captive specimens, or specimens for sale in the trade, more often reach a maximum of roughly 5 cm (2 in). Its body is silvery in color, its fins are largely translucent, and it lacks a red lateral stripe (which is seen in multiple other members of the genus). Instead, its lateral-line scales are reflective green in color, which is the origin of one of its common names - "green-line lizard tetra". The base of its caudal fin sports a distinct black spot.

Iguanodectes is generally a complex genus in terms of morphology, both interspecies and intraspecies, and I. spilurus is an example of this. Ichthyologist Jacques Gery considered it a polymorphic species (i.e. a species that has multiple documented different appearances or forms), though acknowledged uncertainty regarding the causes and mechanisms therein. Several comparative factors can help differentiate it from similar congeners, including its number of lateral-line scales (60-64) and predorsal scales (24).

All members of Iguanodectes are narrow-bodied and shallow-chested, lacking the deep chest seen in sister genus Piabucus. The pectoral fins are also shorter in Iguanodectes.

=== Sexual dimorphism ===
The sexual dimorphism of I. spilurus is minor, but present. Males have small hooks or protrusions on the first few rays of the anal fin during mating season, which is not uncommon in the family Iguanodectidae as a whole. It is more prominent in related genus Bryconops, from the same family.

== Taxonomy ==
Iguanodectes spilurus was originally described as Piabuca spilurus by German-British zoologist Albert Günther in 1864. American ichthyologist Edward Drinker Cope later described it as Iguanodectes tenuis in 1872, under the impression that he was studying a separate species entirely; this was possibly due to the varying coloration of I. spilurus. I. tenius and P. spilurus were synonymized by American ichthyologist James Erwin Böhlke in 1954, with input from Ethelwynn Trewavas, a fellow ichthyologist. Its generic placement within Iguanodectes, a novel genus upon nomination of I. tenuis, was deemed correct based on morphological features, but spilurus became the accepted specific epithet, as it was established prior.

Böhlke also considered Iguanodectes rachovii synonymous with I. spilurus, but this is rejected by modern ichthyologists. I. rachovii is considered its own species.

=== Etymology ===
The specific epithet "spilurus" has Greek roots. "Spilos" means "spot" (compare "Spilogale", the genus of spotted skunks), and "ouros" means "tail" (compare "Ouroboros", the serpent eating its own tail). This is in reference to the distinct spot of pigment on the caudal fin that occupies the junction between lobes. The generic name "Iguanodectes", meanwhile, lacks a clear given meaning in its nominal text; modern etymologists believe that it can be traced to "iguana", the lizard, and "dectes", meaning "tooth" or "bite".

Iguanodectes spilurus sometimes goes by the common name "green-line lizard tetra", based on the way its lateral-line scales reflect green light. Suppliers of ornamental fish can be found selling it under this name.

== Distribution and habitat ==
Iguanodectes spilurus is known from the Amazon, Essequibo, Trombetas, Orinoco, and Tocantins river basins; thus, it is the most widespread member of Iguanodectes. It demonstrates a preference for rocky substrate and flowing water, though it is found in both blackwater (slow-moving) and clearwater habitats.

== Diet and ecology ==
Iguanodectes spilurus is omnivorous, and is a visual animal, using sight to pursue prey (as opposed to a mechanism like sensory barbels). Along with invertebrates, it also eats algae, leaf litter, and detritus. It seems to be easygoing by nature, living in sympatry with various other fish species within its native range (including congeners I. geisleri and I. polylepis).

Iguanodectes spilurus is subject to infection by parasitic nematode larvae of several genera that colonize various internal organs and bodily systems. The liver appears to be the most susceptible to damage from parasitic activity.

=== Presence and behavior in aquaria ===
Aquarists report that I. spilurus is a peaceful species that adapts well to a tank environment. It prefers to be kept in schools of at least 5 congeners, and an optimal aquarium setup for I. spilurus reportedly includes ample swimming room near the surface of the water. Iguanodectes as a genus is not a common sight in the aquarium industry, but is sometimes exported from its native range to countries including Germany and Poland.

While some aquarists have found success with various flake and pellet formulated food recipes, many have experienced a finicky diet for I.spilurus noting that in particular they exhibit high energy but expert it without feeding on a regular schedule when compared to tank mates, even similar or related species.

== Conservation status ==
Iguanodectes spilurus has not been evaluated by the IUCN. However, its range spans several river basins and countries therein, which provides a stable basis for its population. Its wide range also indicates an ability to adapt to changes in its environment (at least to an extent). Therefore, it is unlikely to face immediate threats of endangerment or extinction.
