= Zhustura =

Scientific classification
- Kingdom: Animalia
- Phylum: Chordata
- Class: Actinopterygii
- Division: Teleostei
- Order: Cypriniformes
- Family: Nemacheilidae
- Genus: Zhustura; Endruweit, 2025

Type species
- Noemacheilus shuangjiangensis S.-Q. Zhu & S.-H. Wang, 1985

Genus of fishes

Zhustura is a genus of freshwater ray-finned fish belonging to the family Nemacheilidae, the stone loaches. The fishes in this genus are found in Southeast Asia and southern China.

== Species ==
Zhustura contains the following valid species:

- Zhustura geisleri (Kottelat, 1990)
- Zhustura isostigma (Kottelat, 1998)
- Zhustura shuangjiangensis (S.-Q. Zhu & S.-H. Wang, 1985)
