= Iguanodectes rachovii =

Conservation status
- Least Concern (IUCN 3.1)

Scientific classification
- Kingdom: Animalia
- Phylum: Chordata
- Class: Actinopterygii
- Order: Characiformes
- Family: Iguanodectidae
- Genus: Iguanodectes
- Species: I. rachovii

Binomial name
- Iguanodectes rachovii Regan, 1912

Species of fish

Iguanodectes rachovii is a species of freshwater ray-finned fish belonging to the family Iguanodectidae. This species is found in the rivers of the Amazon basin. It largely consumes insects, though it will eat plants if given the opportunity, and has a peaceful disposition, able to live alongside various other species. It is often found in groups of 3 to 30 specimens, lingering at the edges of streams near the surface of the water.

Given its appealing coloration, I. rachovii has a minor presence in aquarium settings, but is not often taken from the wild for export. Arthur Rachow, an aquarist from Germany, brought specimens of I. rachovii to the attention of British ichthyologist Charles Tate Regan, thereby assisting in the discovery and description of a new species. Subsequently, the fish was named in his honor.

== Description ==
Iguanodectes rachovii is a small fish, reaching a maximum of 6.2 cm (2.4 in) standard length (SL). It has an elongate body shape, and is generally quite slender, as is the case in all Iguanodectes; before it was properly understood as its own species, it was temporarily referred to as the "slender Tetragonopterus". There is no known sexual dimorphism.

The body is generally silvery, with an olive-yellow back, and a prominent lateral stripe. This stripe has three colors - red, silver, and black, from top to bottom. The red coloration originates in the upper half of the eye, and can be traced the length of the body, ending before the caudal fin. The white stripe begins behind the pectoral fin. The black stripe encompasses the bottom of the eyes, and meets a patch of dark pigmentation in the middle of the caudal fin.

The fins are hyaline (clear). The anal fin starts at the middle of the dorsal fin, and has a high number of fin rays, from 30 to 34. This is a differentiating factor from I. rachovii to Hemigrammus gracilis, for which it was originally mistaken (known as Tetragonopterus gracilis at the time); H. gracilis only has 20-24 anal-fin rays.

== Taxonomy ==
Iguanodectes rachovii has retained its original name, given by British ichthyologist Charles Tate Regan in 1912. Though originally mistaken for an unknown member of genus Tetragonopterus, this was swiftly corrected, and I. rachovii has been considered a member of Iguanodectes since description.

=== Etymology ===
The specific name "rachovii" honors German aquarist Arthur Rachow, who brought the type specimen (collected previously, under the assumption that it was a different species) to the attention of the British Museum of Natural History. The generic name "iguanodectes" was not given a clear meaning in the nominal text, but can likely trace its roots to "iguana", the lizard, and "dectes", meaning "bite" or "tooth".

== Distribution and habitat ==
Iguanodectes rachovii has a broad range that encompasses multiple tributaries of various rivers, including the Guamá, Amazon main, Marapanim, and Maracanã rivers. It tends to inhabit the margins of its native streams, which are usually clearwater, and does not demonstrate a notable preference for the presence of currents, found in areas of variable flow.

== Diet and ecology ==
Iguanodectes rachovii is primarily an insectivore with omnivorous traits. Smaller individuals demonstrate a preference for aquatic insects and larvae, while larger individuals tend to target terrestrial insects. Larger specimens will also take supplementary plant material, including algae and riparian vegetation, depending on if the surrounding conditions are favorable for plants that are acceptable for consumption.

Iguanodectes rachovii is a peaceful fish that lives in groups of up to 30 individuals. It is also regularly found in sympatry with unrelated, or distantly related, species. Early specimens were caught alongside the red-spotted tetra, Copeina guttata (then referred to as Pyrrhulina guttata), and Ulrey's tetra, Hemigrammus ulreyi (then referred to as Tetragonopterus ulreyi). Modern studies include the Colletti tetra, Moenkhausia collettii, in sympatric species.

=== Presence and behavior in aquaria ===
In the modern era, I. rachovii is known to be allowed for export for the ornamental fish trade, but details are sparse. Though I. rachovii was lauded by aquarists upon publication for its appealing coloration, collectors were cautioned that it has been observed eating plants commonly found in aquarium settings, like Heteranthera and Cabomba. It seems to have trouble reproducing in captivity.

== Conservation status ==
Iguanodectes rachovii has a Red List evaluation of Least Concern, abundant in its wide native range and with few immediate threats to its population. It has been collected alongside other fish species that often ingest plastic particles as a consequence of pollution, but has not been examined for similar consumption.
