= Iguanodectes adujai =

Conservation status
- Least Concern (IUCN 3.1)

Scientific classification
- Kingdom: Animalia
- Phylum: Chordata
- Class: Actinopterygii
- Order: Characiformes
- Family: Iguanodectidae
- Genus: Iguanodectes
- Species: I. adujai

Binomial name
- Iguanodectes adujai Géry, 1970

Species of fish

Iguanodectes adujai, the redline tetra, is a species of freshwater ray-finned fish belonging to the family Iguanodectidae. This species inhabits the rivers of South America. It largely prefers slow-moving blackwater habitats, though it has a slender body that suggests a further affinity for flowing water. It has a distinct lateral stripe in two horizontal sections, with bright red at the top and yellow at the bottom.

Though rare, it is seen in the aquarium trade, and is sometimes captured from the wild for collection or sale. I. adujai is sometimes sold in the same stock as congener I. geisleri, due to a markedly similar appearance.

== Description ==
Iguanodectes adujai is a small tetra with a slender build, reaching a maximum of 6.2 cm (2.4 in) standard length (SL). The general body shape has been described as similar to a smelt or minnow, something the genus Iguanodectes shares with sister genus Piabucus. I. adujai specifically has pale-silver scales, a yellowish underside, and a red lateral stripe that ends in a blotch of pigmentation at the caudal fin.

The lateral stripe can be used to tell two similar-looking species, Iguanodectes adujai and Iguanodectes geisleri, apart. In geisleri, the lateral stripe is three colors (red, yellow, and black, top-to-bottom), whereas in adujai it is only two (red and yellow). Other identifying characteristics of I. adujai include the anal-fin origin lining up with the dorsal-fin origin (versus being located posterior to the dorsal-fin origin in I. geisleri) and 28-34 anal-fin rays (versus 20-25).

== Taxonomy ==
There are a total of 8 accepted species in the genus Iguanodectes. I. adujai is a fairly recent addition in comparison with other members, the earliest of which (Iguanodectes spilurus) was named in 1864, though considered a member of related genus Piabucus at the time. The latest additions were all named in 1993. I. adujai has no known scientific synonyms, having retained its original name since discovery.

In terms of a common name, I. adujai is sometimes sold under the name "rust-stripe tetra" or "red line lizard tetra". It should not be confused with congener I. geisleri, which is somewhat more common and is sold under the same name. I. adujai has also been sold as the "rainbow lizard tetra" or the "slender tetra". The variety in nomenclature indicates weak consensus on how to refer to the species.

Most members of Iguanodectes are referred to as "piaba" in colloquial Brazilian settings.

=== Etymology ===
The specific name "adujai" originates from the igarapé Adujá, which is the type locality of I. adujai. "Iguanodectes" comes from "iguana", the lizard, and "dectes", meaning "bite" or "tooth"; though it was not made clear in the original text, it is assumed that this is in reference to the "lizard-like" dentition.

== Distribution and habitat ==
Iguanodectes adujai is known from Brazil, Venezuela and Colombia. Its type locality speaks to a preference for blackwater habitats, which are characterized by plentiful riparian vegetation and a substrate largely composed of leaf litter. Specifically, it was first located in the igarapé Aduja, which is a tributary of the Rio Itu, located in the middle Rio Negro basin.

The Rio Negro basin is well-known for its floodplains, including an area in which the Itu is located, and associated flooding cycles may have an influence on I. adujai's diet and behavior. The stretch of wetlands therein is inundated with blackwater rivers. Within the Itu specifically, iron deposits are not uncommon. The relevant riparian vegetation largely consists of sedges and palm trees.

== Diet and ecology ==
Iguanodectes adujai is an omnivorous species, though many Iguanodectes are largely herbivores. It seems to be a fairly opportunistic feeder, including crustaceans, insects, algae, fallen fruit, and leaf litter in its diet. Living in a floodplain means that its food sources fluctuate with the seasons. Little else is known of its interaction with its environment and the food web in its native range.

== Conservation status ==
Iguanodectes adujai has not been evaluated by the IUCN, and is thus lacking in species-specific population evaluation. Nonetheless, freshwater aquatic habitats, especially wetlands, in South America are frequently under pressure from various ongoing anthropogenic hazards, including illegal mining and infrastructure development.

The wetlands of South America are known for their biodiversity, but also their fragility. As such, conservation efforts are often undertaken to protect them, which offers wetland-dwelling species like I. adujai continued stability. Still, there are some legal and social complications surrounding protected sites therein, which may interfere with their role as sanctuaries for endemic species.

== Presence and behavior in aquaria ==
Iguanodectes adujai is exported from its native habitat to various locations, including Germany and Poland, on an uncommon basis. Aquarists describe a largely calm disposition, though males may get combative amongst themselves to establish a hierarchy. It is reportedly sensitive to poor water conditions.

Iguanodectes adujai and Iguanodectes geisleri are sometimes sold in the same stock and labeled as the same species because they may be difficult for the layperson to tell apart.
