= Zhustura geisleri =

Conservation status
- Least Concern (IUCN 3.1)

Scientific classification
- Kingdom: Animalia
- Phylum: Chordata
- Class: Actinopterygii
- Division: Teleostei
- Order: Cypriniformes
- Family: Nemacheilidae
- Genus: Zhustura
- Species: Z. geisleri

Binomial name
- Zhustura geisleri (Kottelat, 1990)

Synonyms
- Schistura geisleri Kottelat, 1990

Species of fish

Zhustura geisleri is a species of freshwater ray-finned fish belonging to the family Nemacheilidae, the stone loaches. Its known range is in the upper parts of the Chao Praya in Thailand but it has also been reported from the Tapi River in Peninsular Thailand, as it has not been recorded from the darainages between these two systems the taxonomic status of the Tapi population may need to be reassessed. Its habitat is slow flowing streams with depths no greater than 30 cm during the dry season and in shallow riffles with a substrate consisting of pebbles which are up to 5 cm in diameter, with a moderate current and clear water.

== Etymology ==
The specific name honours the German aquarist Rolf Geisler (1925–2012), in thanks for his "valuable help".
