= Zhustura shuangjiangensis =

Scientific classification
- Kingdom: Animalia
- Phylum: Chordata
- Class: Actinopterygii
- Division: Teleostei
- Order: Cypriniformes
- Family: Nemacheilidae
- Genus: Zhustura
- Species: Z. shuangjiangensis

Binomial name
- Zhustura shuangjiangensis (S. Q. Zhu & S. H. Wang, 1985)

Synonyms
- Nemacheilus shuangjiangensis S. Q. Zhu & S. H. Wang, 1985; Schistura shuangjiangensis (S. Q. Zhu & S. H. Wang, 1985); Physoschistura shuangjiangensis (S. Q. Zhu & S. H. Wang, 1985)

Species of fish

Zhustura shuangjiangensis is a species of freshwater ray-finned fish belonging to the family Nemacheilidae, the stone loaches. This fish is found in China where it occurs in the upper Mekong basin in Yunnan.
