= Zhustura isostigma =

Conservation status
- Least Concern (IUCN 3.1)

Scientific classification
- Kingdom: Animalia
- Phylum: Chordata
- Class: Actinopterygii
- Division: Teleostei
- Order: Cypriniformes
- Family: Nemacheilidae
- Genus: Zhustura
- Species: Z. isostigma

Binomial name
- Zhustura isostigma (Kottelat, 1998)

Synonyms
- Schistura isostigma Kottelat, 1998

Species of fish

Zhustura isostigma is a species of freshwater ray-finned fish belonging to the family Nemacheilidae, the stone loaches. It occurs in streams with in moderate to fast currents, with sand and gravel beds in the Mekong basin in Laos, it should also occur in Cambodia and Thailand.
