= Rolf Geisler =

German ichthyologist (1925–2012)

Rolf Geisler (27 April 1925 - 25 January 2012) was a German ichthyologist, limnologist and aquarist.

== Life ==
Geisler became an aquarist as a schoolboy and in 1939 he joined the Association for Aquarium and Terrarium Friends e.V. in Hamburg Roßmäßler. Here he had the opportunity to meet prominent aquarists and ichthyologists who recognized and promoted his scientific interest, including Werner Ladiges, Johann Paul Arnold, Arthur Rachow and Hermann Meinken. The book "The Fish in the Landscape" by Werner Ladiges had a great influence on Geisler's professional career. After studying zoology, botany, fisheries science and geography at the University of Hamburg between 1945 and 1949, he received his doctorate in natural sciences in 1950.

From 1950 to 1954, Geisler worked as a research assistant at the Institute of Fisheries Science at the University of Hamburg. From 1954 to 1971 he headed the Freiburg (Breisgau) branch of the Baden-Württemberg State Office of Hydrology. From 1971 to 1988 he worked as an expert in fisheries matters. In 1968 he became a lecturer in applied limnology at the University of Freiburg. In 1977 he was appointed honorary professor at this university. Geisler undertook research trips on behalf of the Max Planck Institute for Limnology, Department of Tropical Ecology, the Gesellschaft für Technische Zusammenarbeit (GTZ) and the Institute for Scientific Cooperation, which took him to Brazil, Bolivia, Peru, Sudan, Saudi Arabia, Sri Lanka, Indonesia, Taiwan, Thailand and Hong Kong. In the Amazon region, he discovered almost thirty new fish species, which he had described by specialists, as he was not a taxonomist himself.

In 1969 he published his only own first description of Corydoras baderi, a species that he dedicated to his friend Herbert Bader. In February 1967, Geisler collected the last known specimens of the possibly extinct barbel species Balantiocheilos ambusticauda in the swamp area of Bueng Boraphet in the Thai province of Nakhon Sawan, which Ng Heok Hee and Maurice Kottelat used as type specimens for their first scientific description in 2007. Geisler retired in 1988.

== Dedication names ==
Several fish species have been named after Geisler,

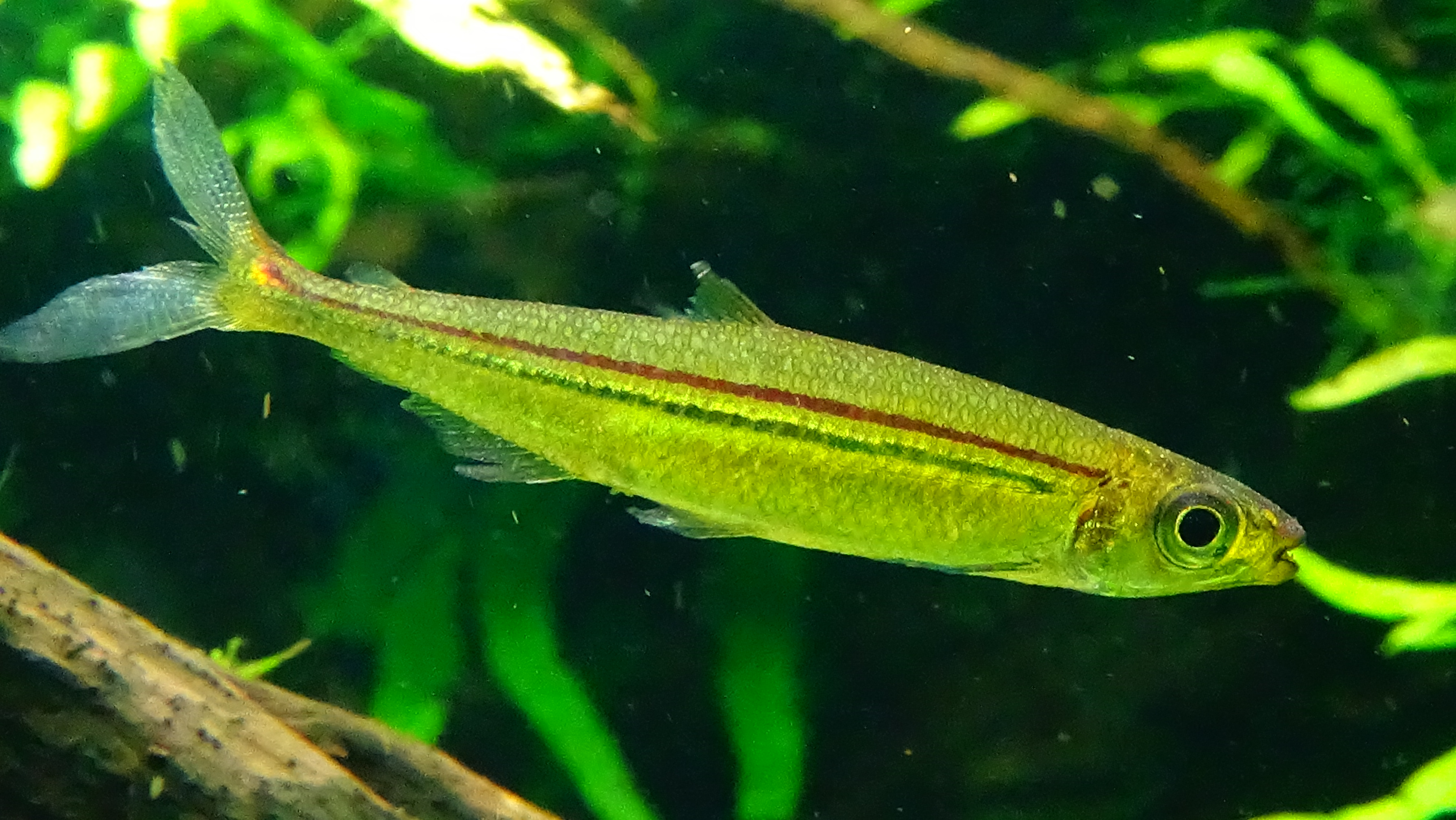
Iguanodectes geisleri

- Schistura geisleri
- Apistogramma geisleri
- Iguanodectes geisleri
- Microschemobrycon geisleri
- Hemigrammus geisleri
- The epithet of the species Axelrodia lindeae was used to honour Geisler's wife Sieglinde.

== Selected publications ==
- Werner Ladiges, Rolf Geisler: Tropical Fish – With a Contribution to Their Breeding, 1954
- Rolf Geisler: Aquarium Fish Diseases, 1960
- Rolf Geisler: Aquarium Water Chemistry, 1963
- Rolf Geisler: Wasserkunde für die Aquaristische Praxis, 1964
- Kaspar Horst, Rolf Geisler, Rudolf Lörz, Horst E. Kipper: Nutrition of aquarium fish In: Aquarium Heute, April 1987
