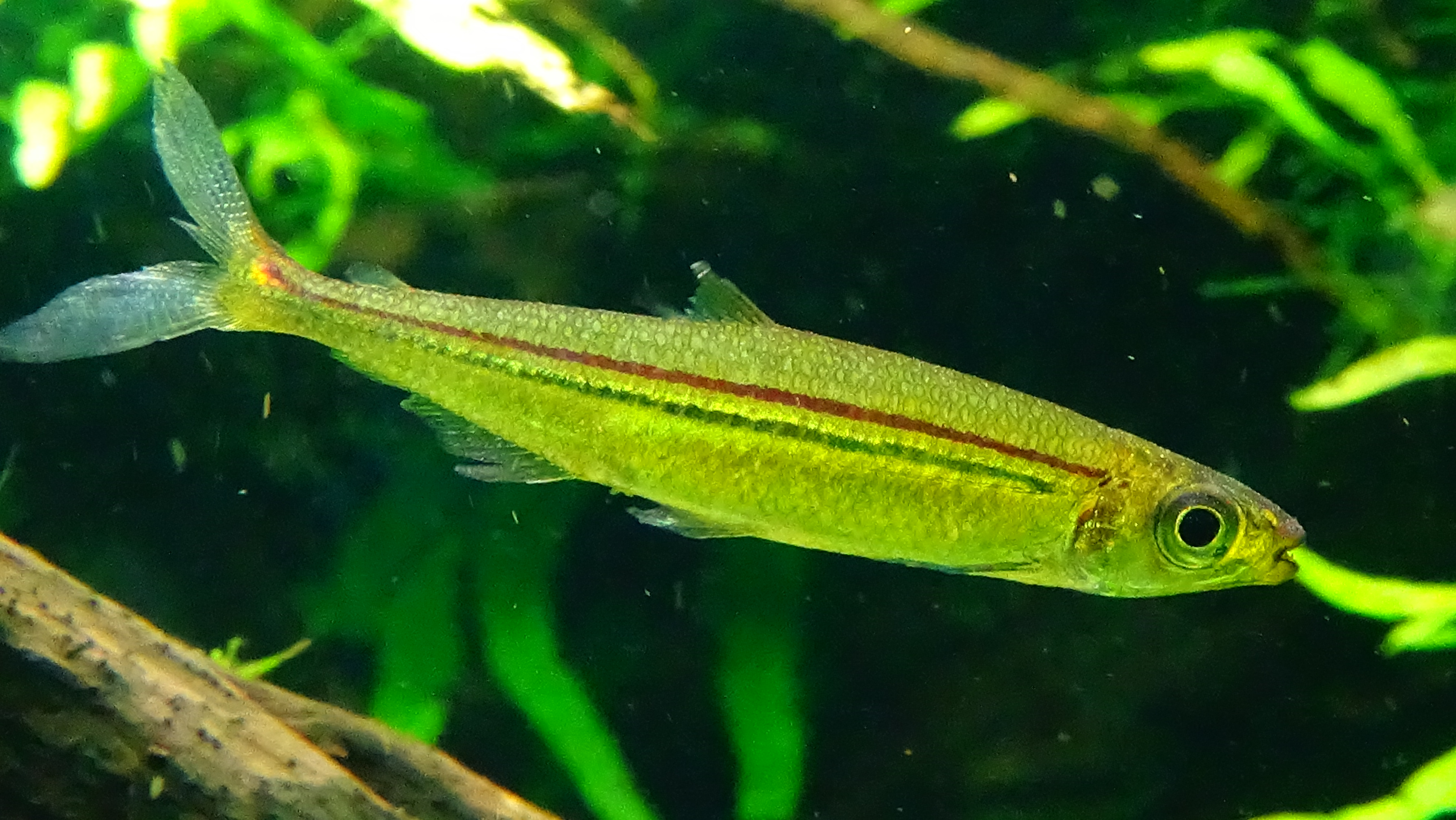

Conservation status
- Least Concern (IUCN 3.1)

Scientific classification
- Kingdom: Animalia
- Phylum: Chordata
- Class: Actinopterygii
- Order: Characiformes
- Family: Iguanodectidae
- Genus: Iguanodectes
- Species: I. geisleri

Binomial name
- Iguanodectes geisleri Géry, 1970

= Iguanodectes geisleri =

Species of fish

Iguanodectes geisleri, the red-line lizard tetra, is a species of freshwater ray-finned fish belonging to the family Iguanodectidae. This fish is found in South America. It is a small species, largely herbivorous with some omnivorous traits, that prefers to live in schools and is partial to shallow waters, especially in blackwater habitats. Some aspects of its body plan are unique amongst its genus, including the position and length of the anal fin.

Much of I. geisleri's behavior is known from observation in aquaria, but the middlingly-limited research in wild settings lines up with what fish keepers have noted. Though taken from the wild for export to various countries, I. geisleri - and members of Iguanodectes as a whole - are not sought out often enough for excessive capture to be of any concern.

== Description ==
Iguanodectes geisleri is a small fish, reaching a maximum of 5.5 cm (2.2 in) standard length (SL). It has a lateral stripe that is divided horizontally into three colors - red at the top, then yellow-green, then black - and the base scale color is yellowish. The three colors of the lateral stripe can be used to differentiate it from similar congener Iguanodectes adujai, whose lateral stripe is only composed of red and yellow-green, lacking the black underline.

Iguanodectes geisleri has several other identifying features. There are 20–25 anal-fin rays, fewer than other species, and the dorsal-fin origin is located in the middle of the body, which is unique to I. geisleri within Iguanodectes as a genus. The relatively short anal fin is also unique.

=== Sexual dimorphism ===
Male and female specimens of I. geisleri show no morphometric differences (differences in size and shape). The main way to tell males and females apart is by the presence of red markings on the pelvic, anal, and caudal fins, particular to male specimens. These fins are clear in females.

There are also behavioral differences, especially observed by aquarists. Females tend to be more placid and get along more readily with conspecifics, but males may get combative amongst themselves in order to show off. They also display brighter colors to impress females.

== Taxonomy ==
Iguanodectes geisleri is a relatively recent addition to the genus Iguanodectes, named in 1970. The earliest member of the genus, Iguanodectes spilurus, was named in 1864 by Albert Günther, though under a different name at the time. I. geisleri has retained its original name since description, but has nonetheless changed taxonomic status; in 2011, researchers determined that the genus Iguanodectes, alongside Bryconops and Piabucus, belonged to a new family, Iguanodectidae, as opposed to their previous placement incertae sedis in Characidae. Iguanodectes and Piabucus make up the subfamily Iguanodectinae.

=== Etymology and nomenclature ===
The specific name "geisleri" is an homage to German biologist Rolf Geisler, who collected the type specimen. The generic name "iguanodectes", though without a definite origin, is likely from "iguana", the lizard, and "dectes", meaning "bite" or "tooth"; its meaning was not made clear in the original text.

Though the scientific community has not accepted a name for I. geisleri at large, hobbyists know it as the red-line lizard tetra. This originates from its lateral stripe, which is in three colors: red at the top, yellow in the middle, and black at the bottom. Red is the most conspicuous color therein. Congener I. adujai is also sometimes sold as the red-line lizard tetra, or rust-striped tetra. The two are rather easy for laypeople to confuse, and are sometimes sold as a part of the same stock, labeled as the same species.

== Distribution and habitat ==
Iguanodectes geisleri is known from the basins of the Madeira, Negro, and Orinoco rivers; the former two are located in Brazil, and the latter in Venezuela. The type locality is in Brazil, a small stream known as the Igarapé de Paricá, a tributary of the Rio Jufari. I. geisleri is largely seen in blackwater habitats, a similarity it shares with other members of Iguanodectes. This is also seen in various members of related genus Bryconops.

The rio Negro specifically gets its name because it is a blackwater river, in which microbial decay releases tannins from leaf litter into the water. (This results in a low amount of available dissolved oxygen, as the microbes use a good deal of oxygen present.) A large portion of rivers in the Orinoco basin are blackwater as well. The Madeira main is whitewater, but its tributaries are both clearwater and blackwater. Blackwater rivers are characterized by plentiful riparian vegetation, which serves as shelter for the river and a food source for the fauna therein.

== Diet and ecology ==
Many members of Iguanodectes are herbivorous. I. geisleri is largely in line with this pattern, including leaf litter, fallen fruit, and filamentous algae in its diet, but aquarists have reported omnivorous habits in captive specimens. Aquarists also note that a captive I. geisleri does best if kept in a school ranging from 5 to 10 fish, which remains true of wild counterparts. Wild fish are further known to peacefully coexist with species from related genera, including Hyphessobrycon melazonatus, Bryconops giacopinii, and Bryconops inpai, though a wider variety of species in one area does result in dietary shifts to maintain a specific ecological niche.

=== Presence and behavior in aquaria ===
Hobbyists report that species from the genus Iguanodectes as a whole are an uncommon sight in the industry. Nonetheless, they are exported from their natural habitat, including to locations such as Germany and Poland, and are known to be peaceful fish, which makes them ideal members of a community tank.

== Conservation status ==
Iguanodectes geisleri has not been evaluated by the IUCN. Its wide range gives it an advantage in terms of population survivability. Nonetheless, the freshwater inland habitats of South America are under constant pressure from anthropogenic sources, including infrastructure development like hydroelectric dams and chemical disruption from illegal mining operations. Specifically, wetlands like the ones I. geisleri prefers are known for their fragility.
