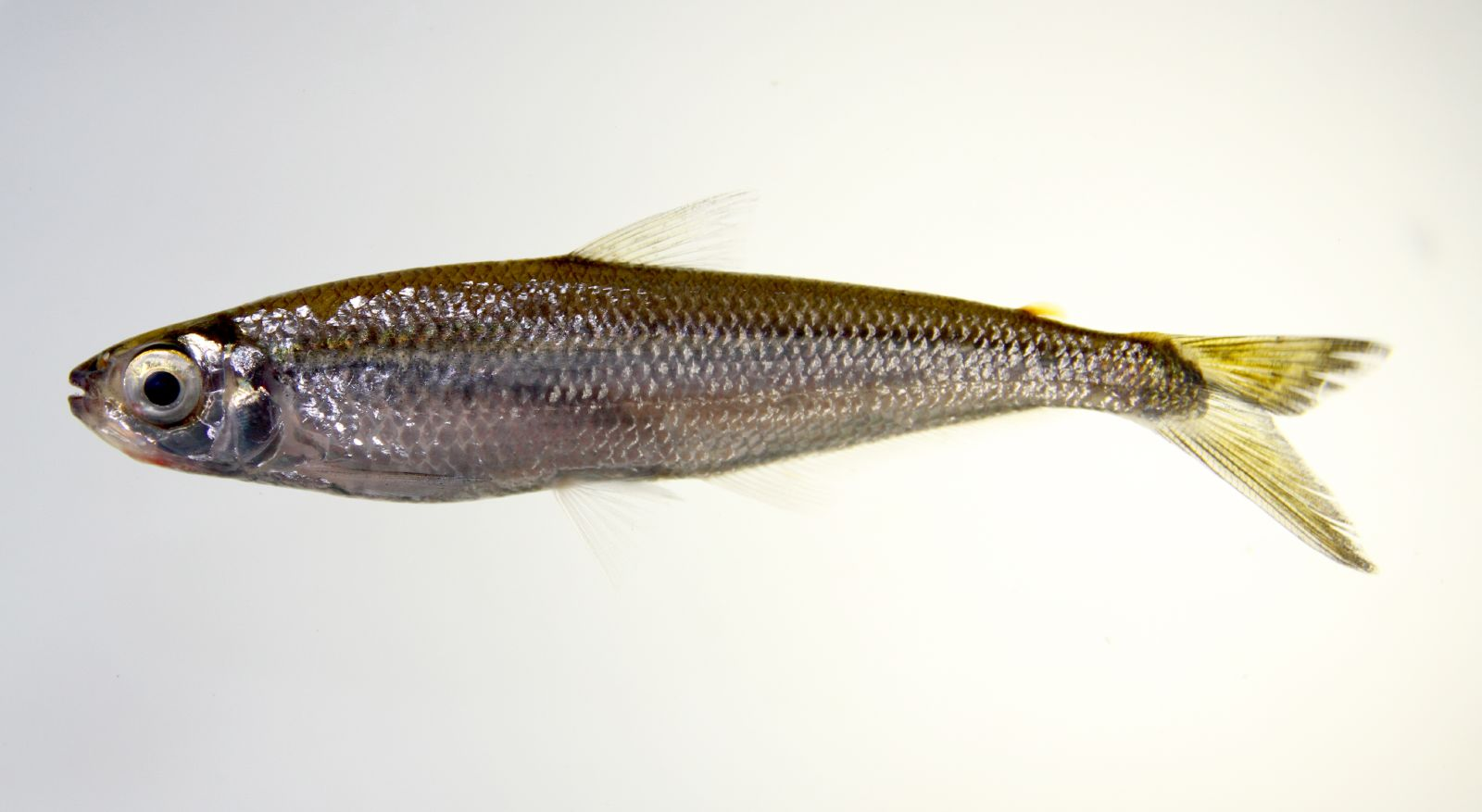
- Iguanodectes sp.

Scientific classification
- Kingdom: Animalia
- Phylum: Chordata
- Class: Actinopterygii
- Order: Characiformes
- Family: Iguanodectidae
- Genus: Iguanodectes; Cope, 1872

Type species
- Iguanodectes tenuis Cope, 1872

Synonyms
- Iguanobrycon Géry, 1970

= Iguanodectes =

Genus of fishes

Iguanodectes is a genus of freshwater ray-finned fish belonging to the family Iguanodectidae. The fishes in this genus are found in tropical South America. They are all small tetras, none longer than 5 inches, and often have attractive silvery or striped scales, which makes them a target for the ornamental fish industry. Alongside the genus Piabucus, it has been treated as belonging to the subfamily Iguanodectinae, which in turn is in the family Iguanodectidae, although this is not universally recognised.

== Description ==
Members of Iguanodectes are relatively slender, shaped somewhat like minnows; ichthyologists Carl H. Eigenmann and James Erwin Böhlke both compared them to smelt in general body composition. The largest (Iguanodectes variatus) reaches 10.3 cm (4.1 in) at a maximum in SL, and the smallest (Iguanodectes gracilis) 4.6 cm (1.6 in). This size makes them relatively easy to keep in captivity, and so several species of Iguanodectes - as with the whole subfamily Iguanodectinae - are seen in aquariums from time to time, with the potential to be a bigger target. However, they are not as common as many other species of tetra. I. geisleri is sold under the name "red line lizard tetra", and I. spilurus has the name "green line lizard tetra". Because I. adujai looks quite similar to I. geisleri, the two species are sometimes found in the same stock.

In all species of Iguanodectes, the lateral line is complete. Sometimes, the scales of the lateral line disrupt coloration that is otherwise fairly uniform, and is often silvery. For instance, I. geisleri has a red stripe on the dorsal side of a dark lateral line, and I. spilurus has lateral line scales that reflect green in certain lighting. Because of this, these two species are sometimes called the red line lizard tetra and green line lizard tetra, respectively. Many species of Iguanodectes lack a common name.

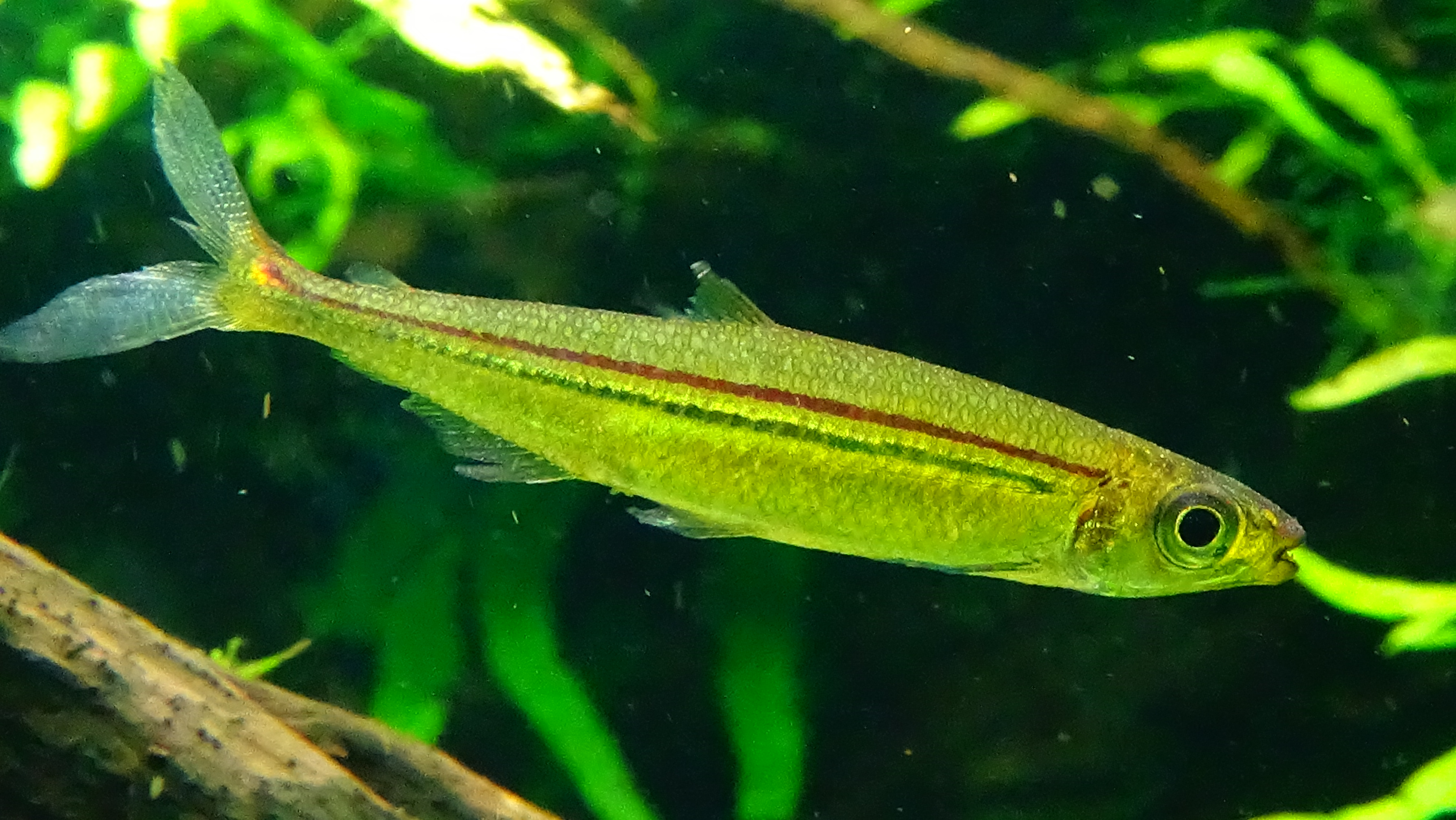
Iguanodectes geisleri

The dorsal fin is usually located behind the middle of the body and behind the start of the pelvic fin, though they sometimes share a line of origin. This is somewhat different in I. geisleri, whose dorsal fin is located closer to the center; I. geisleri also has shorter pelvic fins than its congeners. All species have a small adipose fin. When Iguanodectes is compared to the genus Piabucus, the other member of the subfamily Iguanodectinae, the pectoral fins are shorter and the chest is not as deep.

The mouth is terminal and small, stopping before it reaches under the eye. In all Iguanodectes, the maxilla bears a set of multicuspid incisor teeth that are flared out at the tip and contracted at the base. The premaxilla also has one or two teeth on each side, forming an "outer set". Little else is known of their ecology, but members of Iguanodectes utilize this setup for a primarily herbivorous diet. Though the allusion was not clear in the original text, modern etymologists has come to the conclusion that the name of the genus originates in Greek and translates to "lizard bite", in reference to the dentition. As a result of this, the common name "lizard bite tetra" has been suggested for the entire family Iguanodectidae, but has not been accepted.

== Taxonomy ==
Iguanodectes contains the following species:

- Iguanodectes adujai Géry, 1970
- Iguanodectes geisleri Géry, 1970
- Iguanodectes gracilis Géry, 1993
- Iguanodectes polylepis Géry, 1993
- Iguanodectes purusii (Steindachner, 1908)
- Iguanodectes rachovii Regan, 1912
- Iguanodectes spilurus (Günther, 1864)
- Iguanodectes variatus Géry, 1993

Iguanodectes, along with the genus Piabucus, is spmetimes classified in the subfamily Iguanodectinae; In turn, Iguanodectinae is in the family Iguanodectidae, both of which get their name from Iguanodectes. In 1909, ichthyologist Carl H. Eigenmann proposed Iguanodectinae as a subfamily, which was solely home to Iguanodectes at the time. In 1929, Iguanodectinae grew to encompass Piabucus as well. In 1954, ichthyologist James Erwin Böhlke reconfirmed that the two genera should form a clade by way of morphology. Iguanodectinae and the monotypic Bryconops clade make up the family Iguanodectidae. However, Eschmeyer's Catalog of Fishes does not recognise subfamilies in the Iguanodectidae.

The first member of Iguanodectes to be classified, I. spilurus, was originally described as Piabuca spilurus by zoologist Albert Günther in 1864. In 1872, biologist Edward Drinker Cope described the same species as Iguanodectes tenuis. Cope's placement of the species into a new genus was later accepted, but it adopted the specific epithet given by Günther.

Upon being described, Iguanodectes was considered a characin (member of the family Characidae). This was still the case when it was placed in the subfamily Iguanodectinae in 1909. However, research by Oliviera et al. in 2011 prompted authorities to move Iguanodectinae and Bryconops to Iguanodectidae, which had been revived from Eigenmann's work. This was done based on morphological and phylogenetic evidence, as well as keeping Characidae monophyletic. As a fairly new taxon, Iguanodectinae is not listed in several databases; sources such as NCBI and the Interim Register of Marine and Nonmarine Genera consider it synonymous with Iguanodectidae, where Eschmeyer's Catalog of Fishes and GBIF simply do not acknowledge it, uniting all three genera in Iguanodectidae. However, sources such as OBIS and the World Register of Marine Species consider it valid.

== Habitat ==
Like all members of the family Iguanodectidae, members of Iguanodectes solely inhabit freshwater environments in South America. Iguanodectes specifically can be found in the Amazon river and all of its major tributaries, as well as the Guaporé, Trombetas, Orinoco, and Tocantins rivers. Though their ecology has not been studied extensively, captive specimens demonstrate a poor tolerance for adverse water conditions. They also prefer flowing water, and have a proclivity for swimming near the surface. Some species, like I. geisleri, are known to live in blackwater environments.
