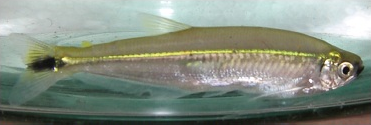
- Piabucus melanostoma

Scientific classification
- Kingdom: Animalia
- Phylum: Chordata
- Class: Actinopterygii
- Order: Characiformes
- Family: Iguanodectidae
- Genus: Piabucus; Oken, 1817

Type species
- Salmo argentinus Linnaeus, 1766

Synonyms
- Piabuca Müller & Troschel, 1844; Piabucidium Myers, 1929

= Piabucus =

Genus of fishes

Piabucus is a genus of freshwater tetras in the family Iguanodectidae. All three species are found in South America, largely the Amazon and its major tributaries. None of them are longer than half a foot long, with the largest reaching a maximum size of 12.9 cm (5.1 in), and they are slender, with relatively deep chests and long pectoral fins. Their scales are pale or silvery, with lateral lines that stand out.

At least one species, Piabucus dentatus, is known to be collected for the aquarium industry. All three species are sometimes given the collective name "chin tetras" by sellers, in reference to markings on the lower jaw. However, none of the species are considered endangered, so capture of wild specimens is not an immediate threat to population numbers. As well as this, collection is not happening at a high enough rate to be of any concern.

Piabucus has a close relative in the genus Iguanodectes. The two are paired in the subfamily Iguanodectinae by some authorities, forming a clade. The genus Bryconops makes up a monogeneric sister clade, and the three genera together make up the family Iguanodectidae. There is minor, but ongoing, debate regarding Iguanodectinae and Iguanodectidae, as some authorities still list Piabucus in the family Characidae.

== Description ==
As a genus, Piabucus are somewhat slender, rather minnow-shaped. Ichthyologists Carl H. Eigenmann and James Erwin Böhlke likened all members of Iguanodectinae, including Piabucus, to smelt. Though generally similar in appearance to the sister genus Iguanodectes, Piabucus can be told apart because it has a deeper chest and longer pectoral fins. The name "Piabucus" comes from the genus' general appearance; the word "piabucu" was used in 17th-century Brazil to refer to various small characiform fishes. It has also been posited that "Piabucus" comes from "Piaba", a region of Barcelos, Brazil, and "bucca", meaning "mouth".

All members of Piabucus are under 15 cm (5.9 in) in length. The shortest (in standard length) is P. caudomaculatus at 9.6 cm (3.8 in), followed by P. melanostoma at 11.5 cm (4.5 in), and P. dentatus is the longest at 12.9 cm (5.1 in). This makes them slightly longer on average than Iguanodectes, whose size ranges from 4.6 to 10.3 cm (1.8 to 4.1 in) SL.

In all species, the lateral line is complete, and the scales therein often stand out from the rest of the body, which is covered in pale or silvery scales. For instance, Piabucus dentatus has lateral line scales that reflect green in some lights, similar to Iguanodectes spilurus (the "green line lizard tetra"); P. dentatus' deeper pectoral keel and fin shape make the two relatively easy to differentiate.

In other cases, different markings are present; Piabucus melanostoma can be told apart from other members of the genus by markings on its lower jaw, which is where its specific epithet comes from; "melano-" means "black" and "-stoma" means "mouth". P. caudomaculatus' specific epithet also originates from its appearance, because "caudo-" means "tail" and "maculatus" means "spotted", referring to the dark patch on the caudal peduncle. P. dentatus' markings have earned unidentified Piabucus tetras the nickname "chin tetra" amongst aquarium hobbyists.

The dentition of Piabucus is relatively complete amongst characiform fishes, as is the case with the entire family Iguanodectidae (hence the name; "Iguanodectes" means "lizard bite"). The mouth is small and terminal, and the teeth contract at the base and flare out towards the tip. The maxilla is equipped with a full set of multicuspid incisors, and the premaxilla has one or two teeth on each side in all species, forming an "outer set". The exception to this is Piabucus melanostoma, which lacks this outer set.

== Taxonomy ==
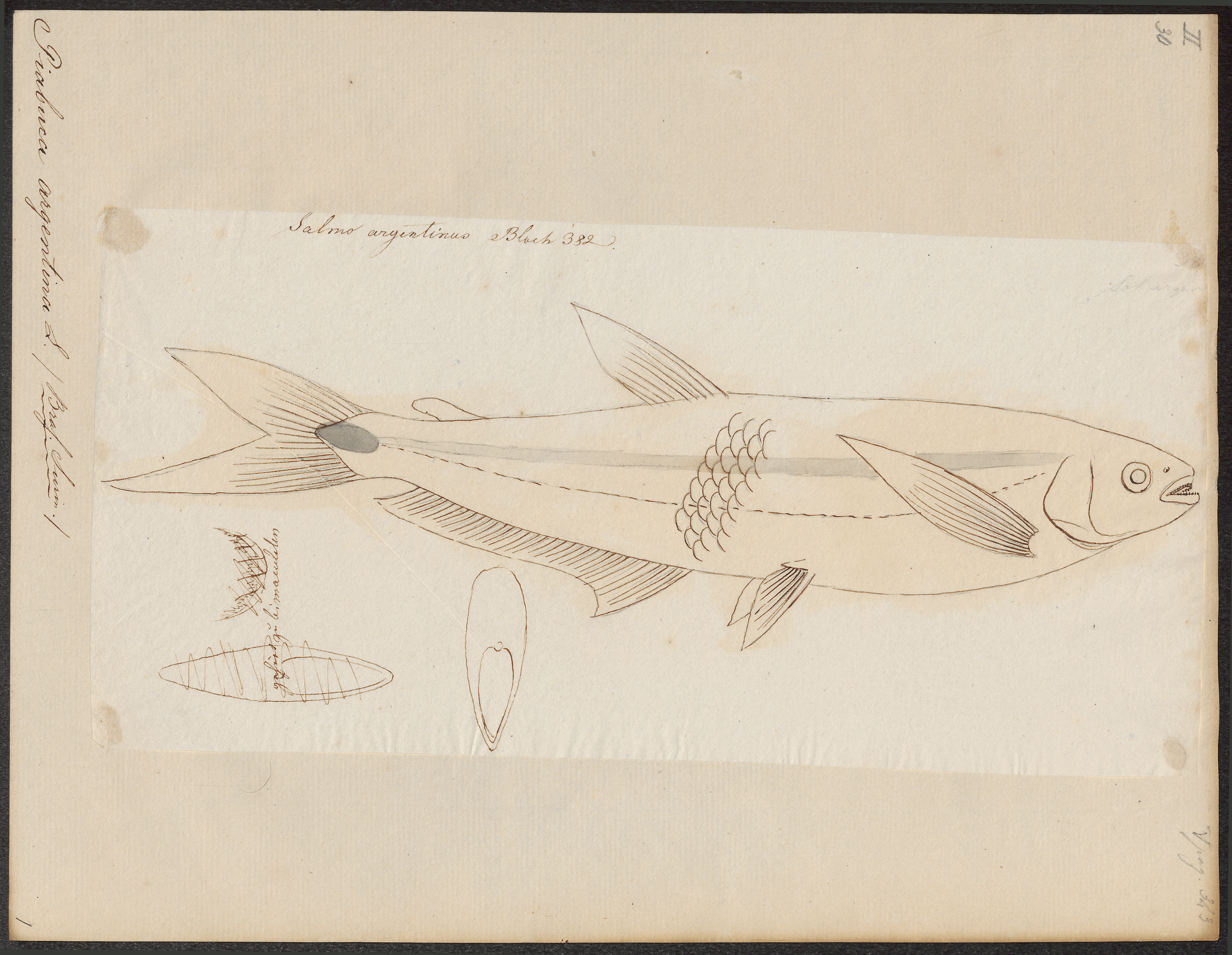
An 1800s-era illustration of Piabuca argentina, now named Piabucus dentatus

Piabucus contains the following valid species:

- Piabucus caudomaculatus Vari, 1977
- Piabucus dentatus (Kölreuter, 1763)
- Piabucus melanostoma Holmberg, 1891

When originally classified, Piabucus was considered a characin (member of Characidae). In 1929, ichthyologist Carl H. Eigenmann moved it to the subfamily Iguanodectinae alongside the genus Iguanodectes, still in Characidae. James Erwin Böhlke reconfirmed this move through use of morphology in 1954. In 2011, research by Oliviera et al. showed that Bryconops was closely related to Iguanodectinae, and posited that the two clades be moved to the new family Iguanodectidae.

Piabucus was first described in 1817 by German biologist Lorenz Oken when he named the species Piabucus dentatus. The true first member of the genus was not given a binomial name when described by Joseph Gottlieb Kölreuter in 1760, though he did introduce a genus Piabucu, and this was based on the work of Georg Marcgrave in his book Historia Naturalis Brasiliae from 1648.

Many sources mistakenly report the baisonym of Piabucus dentatus as being Trutta dentata, partially because James Erwin Böhlke reported it as such in a 1954 paper. Subsequently, French ichthyologist Jacques Géry followed Böhlke's lead in a paper from 1972. However, "trutta dentata" is simply Latin for "toothed trout", which is one of the most general labels that researchers give to fish. (The opposite is "trutta edentula", which means "toothless trout".)This is further evidenced in the fact that "trutta dentata" as a phrase appears as far back as 1740. Furthermore, the genus Trutta (now obsolete, synonymized with Salmo) was not available as a classification until 1764, upon proposition by French zoologist François Alexandre Pierre de Garsault.

== Habitat and ecology ==
Like all members of Iguanodectidae, members of Piabucus reside solely in South America. They are found in freshwater environments, though they are known to tolerate brackish water as well, venturing into estuaries. Piabucus is known from the Mamoré, Paraguay, and Madeira rivers, as well as the lower Amazon river basin. In the Paraguay river, it is only represented by P. melanostoma, which is also the only species from the subfamily Iguanodectinae to reside therein. P. dentatus is the only species to reside in Guyana. P. dentatus was also mistakenly listed as appearing in Peru by Eigenmann in 1910, but this is not the case.

Members of Piabucus, while all inhabiting freshwater, prefer varying environments. At least one species, P. caudomaculatus, is known to occur in blackwater habitats. P. dentatus is found in muddy, unclear waters. P. melanostoma lives in an area subject to regular flooding and takes advantage of bodies of still water left behind, feeding on plants, algae, and small invertebrates that are swept in. P. dentatus and P. caudomaculatus are more insectivorous than omnivorous.

=== Conservation status ===
Piabucus, while taken from the wild for the ornamental fish trade, is not being collected at a high enough rate to warrant concern for the genus. P. caudomaculatus and P. dentatus have both been assessed by the IUCN as species of least concern; reports from hobbyists show that collection of P. dentatus is ongoing. P. melanostoma, while not assessed, is assumed to have a stable population due to its wide range, despite dispersion abilities limited by a flood-cycle wetland habitat.
