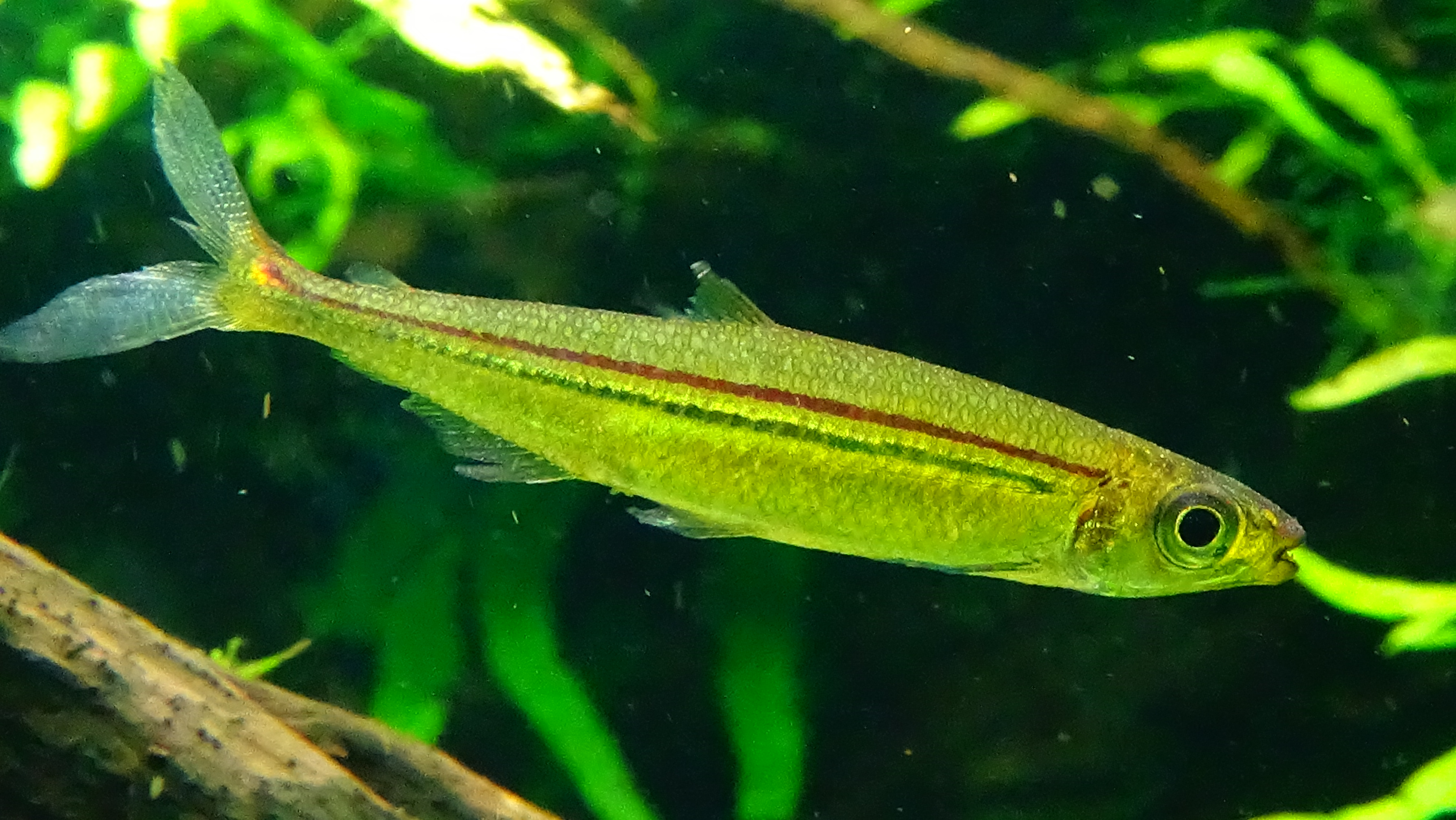
- Iguanodectes geisleri

Scientific classification
- Kingdom: Animalia
- Phylum: Chordata
- Class: Actinopterygii
- Order: Characiformes
- Suborder: Characoidei
- Family: Iguanodectidae; C. H. Eigenmann, 1909

Genera
- see text

= Iguanodectidae =

Family of fish

Iguanodectidae is a family of freshwater fish in the order Characiformes that lives in South America. It contains three genera: Iguanodectes, Piabucus, and Bryconops. Several species in the family, such as the green line lizard tetra (Iguanodectes spilurus), the tailspot tetra (Bryconops caudomaculatus), and the orangefin tetra (Bryconops affinis), are sometimes taken as aquarium fish.

== Etymology ==
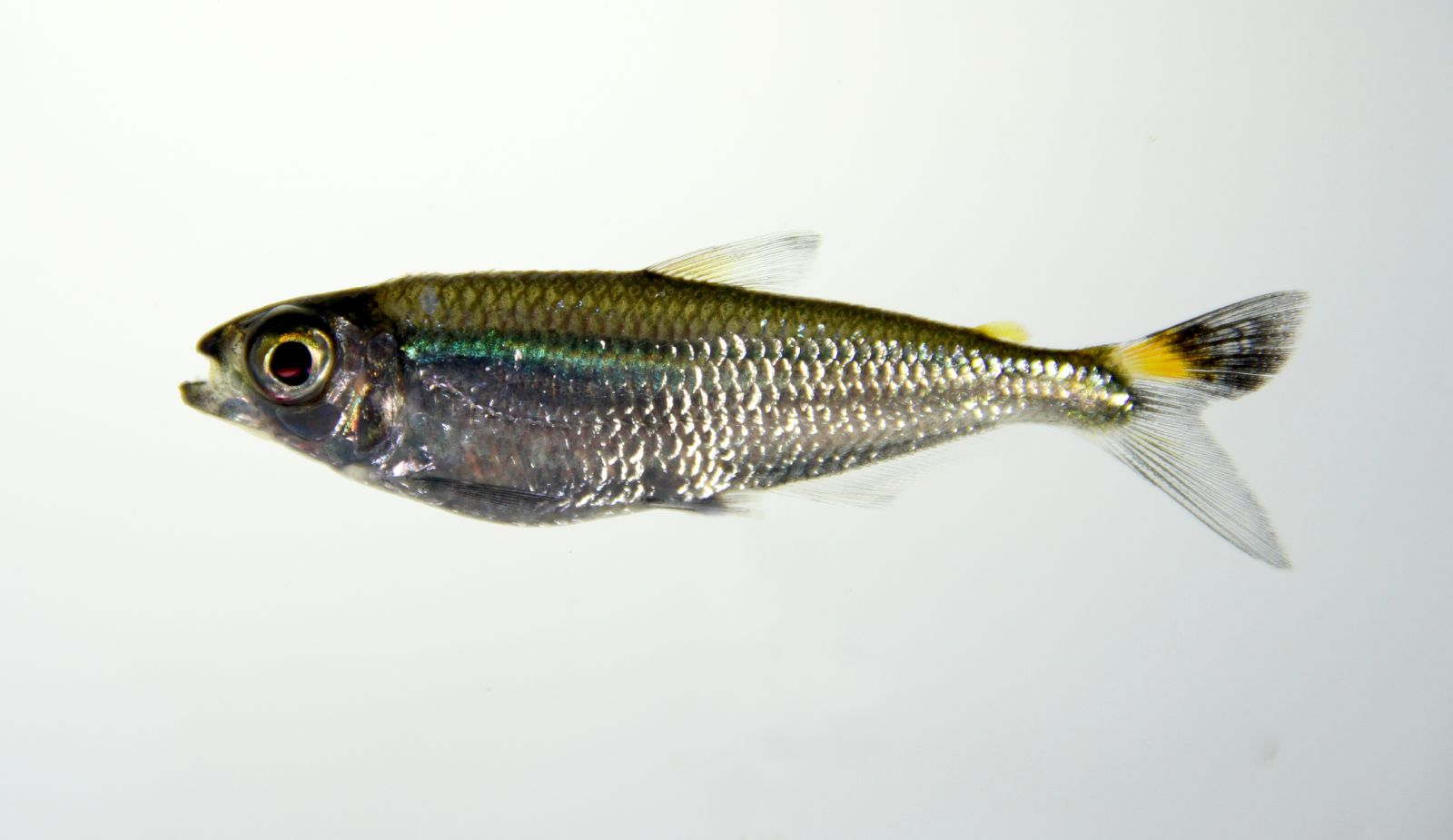
Bryconops cf. caudomaculatus

The family name "Iguanodectidae" originates in the genus name "Iguanodectes", which used to be its sole representative. The origin of such was not made clear upon its nomination, but is assumed to be from "iguana", the lizard, and "dectes", meaning "bite", in reference to the general dentition's almost lizard-like formation. The common name "lizard bite tetra" has been proposed in reference to this, though this has not been widely accepted as of 2022.

== Description ==
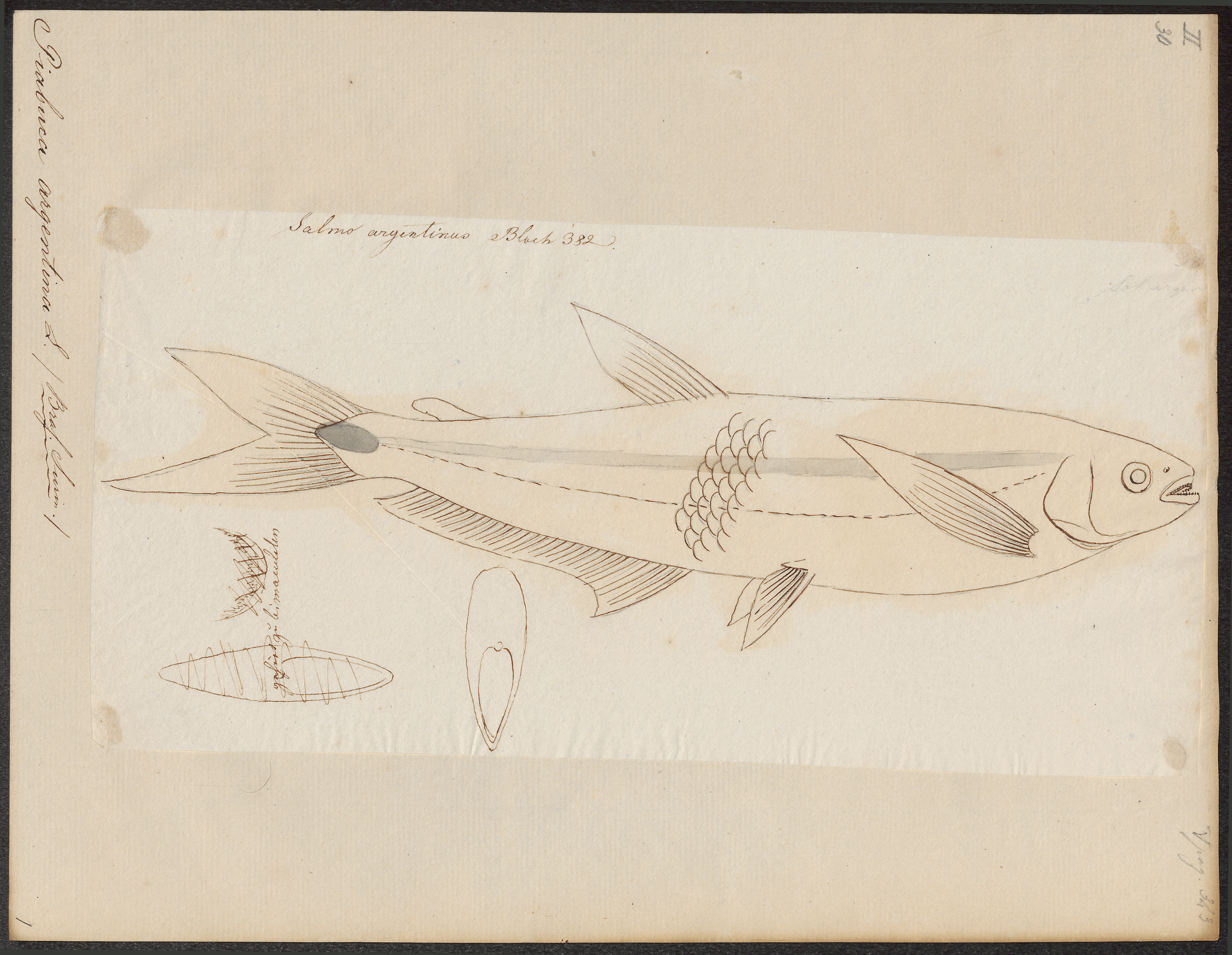
An 1800s-era illustration of Piabuca argentina, now named Piabucus dentatus

Iguanodectids are generally small, and are brightly colored or reflective, making them moderately-popular ornamental fish. They range from 3.1 cm to 15 cm SL (standard length). They are rather narrow in shape, somewhat resembling minnows; ichthyologist Carl H. Eigenmann compared them to smelt.

Members of Piabucus are slightly larger than members of Iguanodectes, reaching a maximum of 12.9 cm (5.1 in), while members of Iguanodectes only reach 10.3 cm (4.1 in). They are slender and rather elongate in body shape, comparable to minnows; ichthyologist Carl H. Eigenmann, who named the subfamily, likened them to smelt. Their scales are often brightly colored or reflective, and this, combined with their small size, makes them a potential target for the aquarium industry.

The dorsal fin is located behind the middle of the body and usually behind the start of the pelvic fin, though sometimes the dorsal and pelvic fins are on the same line of origin. All members of the subfamily have a small dorsal adipose fin. Piabucus typically have longer pectoral fins and a deeper chest than Iguanodectes (sometimes described as a more pronounced "pectoral keel"). The lateral line is complete in all species. The species Iguanodectes geisleri has some morphological differences when compared to its congeners; its dorsal fin originates in the middle of the body, as opposed to behind the middle, and its anal fin is shorter in length.

The mouth is small, terminal, and does not extend past or under the eye. The maxilla is equipped with multicuspid incisor teeth, contracted at the base and flaring outwards. The premaxilla has one or two teeth on each side in all species, except for Piabucus melanostomus, which lacks this "outer set". This dentition is primarily used for an herbivorous diet, at least in Iguanodectes, but little is known of the subfamily's ecology outside of this.

== Habitat ==
Iguanodectids are found in South America, spread all across the northern half of the continent. Though they primarily inhabit freshwater, Iguanodectid fishes are known to tolerate brackish water as well. Habitat destruction, by way of land development and aquaculture, is the biggest threat to members of Iguanodectidae, though evaluated species are mostly considered least concern by the International Union for the Conservation of Nature (IUCN).

They can be found in the Amazon, Orinoco, Tocantins, and Paraguay rivers, as well as all major tributaries of the Amazon. Of these, the Paraguay is the least-populated; Iguanodectinae is only represented therein by a few species in the genus Piabucus. When in captivity, species from both genera have been observed to be intolerant of poor water conditions, demonstrating a preference for a well-oxygenated environment. They seem to prefer swimming near the surface of the water.

== Classification ==
Iguanodectidae is in the order Characiformes, with three extant genera - Bryconops, Iguanodectes, and Piabucus. Said genera used to be classified in the family Characidae, but have since been reclassified in order to keep Characidae monophyletic.

Iguanodectidae contains the following genera:

- Bryconops Kner, 1858
- Iguanodectes Cope, 1872
- Piabucus Oken, 1917

Bryconops is the most speciose genus, with 21 valid species. Iguanodectes is next-largest with 8, and Piabucus has the fewest at 3.

Iguanodectes and Piabucus are largely considered to make up the subfamily Iguanodectinae, with Bryconops becoming its own separate clade, but this is a matter of debate. Several sources accept the subfamily Iguanodectinae as its own entity, but others consider it synonymous with Iguanodectidae or simply do not acknowledge it, uniting the genera therein. ITIS considers it synonymous with Characidae, which is a reflection of its older classification.

Iguanodectinae, when first officially classified by Carl H. Eigenmann in 1909, was placed in the family Characidae, and only contained the genus Iguanodectes; by 1929, it had grown to include the genus Piabucus. Through 1977, this remained the case. In 2011, Iguanodectinae was found to be closely related to Bryconops, and the two clades were combined in Iguanodectidae.

== History ==
The family Iguanodectidae was resurrected from Eigenmann's work in 2011 by Oliveira et al. to contain Iguanodectinae and Bryconops. Iguanodectinae itself was classified in 1909, and therefore Iguanodectidae is often considered to originate in the same year, despite the recent nature of the study.

== In aquaria ==
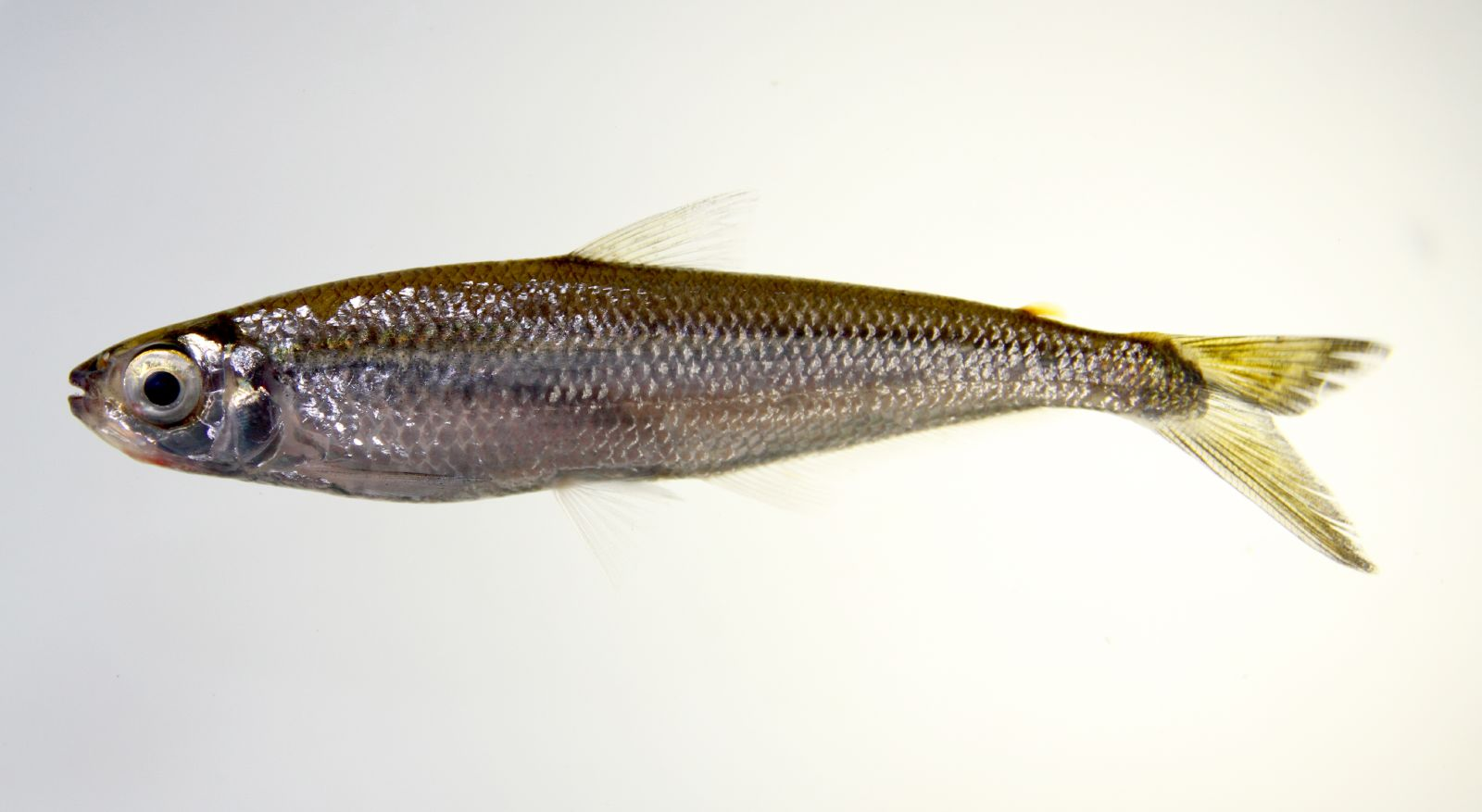
An unidentified Iguanodectes sp.

Though data is limited, it is known that Bryconops colanegra, Bryconops colaroja, and Piabucus dentatus are seen in the ornamental fish trade. Iguanodectes geisleri is rare, but is sold under the name "red line lizard tetra". One of its congeners, Iguanodectes spilurus, is called the "green line lizard tetra", and is sensitive to poor water conditions.

Though not as popular as many other species of tetra, several members of Iguanodectinae are seen in the aquarium trade. Piabucus dentatus, sometimes called the Piabuco tetra, is taken from the wild for such purposes, but is not at risk of going extinct from it. Reports from hobbyists as recently as "the summer of 2018" show that such collection is still ongoing. It tends to form groups, so aquarists are recommended to house as many as at least 6 at a time. This goes for the other species of Piabucus as well; all three are sometimes grouped as Piabucus sp. and called "chin tetras". This is likely due to distinct markings on the lower jaw.

Fish from Iguanodectes are slightly more common than from Piabucus, but are still infrequent in the trade. I. geisleri is sold under the name "red line lizard tetra", and I. spilurus has the name "green line lizard tetra". I. adujai looks quite similar to I. geisleri, so is sometimes part of the same stock.
