= List of Intermediate and Immediate Geographic Regions =

This is a list of intermediate and immediate geographic regions of Brazil, which represent the regional division of the country created by the Brazilian Institute of Geography and Statistics (IBGE) in 2017.

Brazil is made up of five geographic regions (North, Northeast, Southeast, South and central-West) that comprise 27 federative units and, for their part include 5570 municipalities. In total, the municipalities are distributed in 510 immediate geographic regions, which in turn are grouped into 133 intermediate geographic regions. The list is divided between the five Brazilian geographic regions and the regional divisions are ordered by IBGE coding.

== North ==
Federative unit	UF Code	Intermediate Region	Intermediate Region Code	Number of Municipalities	Immediate Region	Immediate Region Code	Number of Municipalities
Rondônia	11	Porto Velho	1101	18	Porto Velho	110001	5
Rondônia	11	Porto Velho	1101	18	Ariquemes	110002	8
Rondônia	11	Porto Velho	1101	18	Jaru	110003	5
Rondônia	11	Ji-Paraná	1102	34	Ji-Paraná	110004	13
Rondônia	11	Ji-Paraná	1102	34	Cacoal	110005	14
Rondônia	11	Ji-Paraná	1102	34	Vilhena	110006	7
Acre	12	Rio Branco	1201	14	Rio Branco	120001	7
Acre	12	Rio Branco	1201	14	Brasiléia	120002	4
Acre	12	Rio Branco	1201	14	Sena Madureira	120003	3
Acre	12	Cruzeiro do Sul	1202	8	Cruzeiro do Sul	120004	5
Acre	12	Cruzeiro do Sul	1202	8	Tarauacá	120005	3
Amazonas	13	Manaus	1301	21	Manaus	130001	10
Amazonas	13	Manaus	1301	21	São Gabriel da Cachoeira	130002	3
Amazonas	13	Manaus	1301	21	Coari	130003	4
Amazonas	13	Manaus	1301	21	Manacapuru	130004	4
Amazonas	13	Tefé	1302	21	Tefé	130005	9
Amazonas	13	Tefé	1302	21	Tabatinga	130006	7
Amazonas	13	Tefé	1302	21	Eirunepé	130007	5
Amazonas	13	Lábrea	1303	9	Lábrea	130008	5
Amazonas	13	Lábrea	1303	9	Manicoré	130009	4
Amazonas	13	Parintins	1304	11	Parintins	130010	5
Amazonas	13	Parintins	1304	11	Itacoatiara	130011	6
Roraima	14	Boa Vista	1401	9	Boa Vista	140001	5
Roraima	14	Boa Vista	1401	9	Pacaraima	140002	4
Roraima	14	Rorainópolis-Caracaraí	1402	6	Rorainópolis	140003	4
Roraima	14	Rorainópolis-Caracaraí	1402	6	Caracaraí	140004	2
Pará	15	Belém	1501	23	Belém	150001	15
Pará	15	Belém	1501	23	Cametá	150002	4
Pará	15	Belém	1501	23	Abaetetuba	150003	4
Pará	15	Castanhal	1502	39	Castanhal	150004	14
Pará	15	Castanhal	1502	39	Bragança	150005	6
Pará	15	Castanhal	1502	39	Capanema	150006	9
Pará	15	Castanhal	1502	39	Paragominas	150007	6
Pará	15	Castanhal	1502	39	Capitão Poço	150008	4
Pará	15	Marabá	1503	23	Marabá	150009	13
Pará	15	Marabá	1503	23	Parauapebas	150010	4
Pará	15	Marabá	1503	23	Tucuruí	150011	6
Pará	15	Redenção	1504	15	Redenção	150012	8
Pará	15	Redenção	1504	15	Tucumã-São Félix do Xingu	150013	3
Pará	15	Redenção	1504	15	Xinguara	150014	4
Pará	15	Santarém	1505	19	Santarém	150015	6
Pará	15	Santarém	1505	19	Itaituba	150016	7
Pará	15	Santarém	1505	19	Oriximiná	150017	6
Pará	15	Altamira	1506	9	Altamira	150018	7
Pará	15	Altamira	1506	9	Almeirim-Porto de Moz	150019	2
Pará	15	Breves	1507	16	Breves	150020	10
Pará	15	Breves	1507	16	Soure-Salvaterra	150021	6
Amapá	16	Macapá	1601	6	Macapá	160001	4
Amapá	16	Macapá	1601	6	Laranjal do Jari	160002	2
Amapá	16	Oiapoque-Porto Grande	1602	10	Oiapoque	160003	6
Amapá	16	Oiapoque-Porto Grande	1602	10	Porto Grande	160004	4
Tocantins	17	Palmas	1701	42	Palmas	170001	10
Tocantins	17	Palmas	1701	42	Porto Nacional	170002	13
Tocantins	17	Palmas	1701	42	Paraíso do Tocantins	170003	14
Tocantins	17	Palmas	1701	42	Miracema do Tocantins	170004	5
Tocantins	17	Araguaína	1702	65	Araguaína	170005	21
Tocantins	17	Araguaína	1702	65	Guaraí	170006	14
Tocantins	17	Araguaína	1702	65	Colinas do Tocantins	170007	9
Tocantins	17	Araguaína	1702	65	Tocantinópolis	170008	8
Tocantins	17	Araguaína	1702	65	Araguatins	170009	13
Tocantins	17	Gurupi	1703	32	Gurupi	170010	18
Tocantins	17	Gurupi	1703	32	Dianópolis	170011	14

== Northeast ==
Federative unit	UF Code	Intermediate Region	Intermediate Region Code	Number of Municipalities	Immediate Region	Immediate Region Code	Number of Municipalities
Maranhão	21	São Luís	2101	73	São Luís	210001	13
Maranhão	21	São Luís	2101	73	Pinheiro	210002	11
Maranhão	21	São Luís	2101	73	Chapadinha	210003	10
Maranhão	21	São Luís	2101	73	Itapecuru Mirim	210004	9
Maranhão	21	São Luís	2101	73	Viana	210005	10
Maranhão	21	São Luís	2101	73	Barreirinhas	210006	4
Maranhão	21	São Luís	2101	73	Tutóia-Araioses	210007	7
Maranhão	21	São Luís	2101	73	Cururupu	210008	9
Maranhão	21	Santa Inês-Bacabal	2102	59	Santa Inês	210009	15
Maranhão	21	Santa Inês-Bacabal	2102	59	Bacabal	210010	16
Maranhão	21	Santa Inês-Bacabal	2102	59	Governador Nunes Freire	210011	14
Maranhão	21	Santa Inês-Bacabal	2102	59	Pedreiras	210012	14
Maranhão	21	Caxias	2103	14	Caxias	210013	6
Maranhão	21	Caxias	2103	14	Timon	210014	4
Maranhão	21	Caxias	2103	14	Codó	210015	4
Maranhão	21	Presidente Dutra	2104	28	Presidente Dutra	210016	13
Maranhão	21	Presidente Dutra	2104	28	São João dos Patos	210017	11
Maranhão	21	Presidente Dutra	2104	28	Colinas	210018	4
Maranhão	21	Imperatriz	2105	43	Imperatriz	210019	17
Maranhão	21	Imperatriz	2105	43	Barra do Corda	210020	9
Maranhão	21	Imperatriz	2105	43	Açailândia	210021	5
Maranhão	21	Imperatriz	2105	43	Balsas	210022	12
Piauí	22	Teresina	2201	65	Teresina	220001	16
Piauí	22	Teresina	2201	65	Amarante-Água Branca- Regeneração	220002	22
Piauí	22	Teresina	2201	65	Campo Maior	220003	12
Piauí	22	Teresina	2201	65	Valença do Piauí	220004	9
Piauí	22	Teresina	2201	65	Barras	220005	6
Piauí	22	Parnaíba	2202	30	Parnaíba	220006	11
Piauí	22	Parnaíba	2202	30	Piripiri	220007	10
Piauí	22	Parnaíba	2202	30	Esperantina	220008	9
Piauí	22	Picos	2203	58	Picos	220009	33
Piauí	22	Picos	2203	58	Paulistana	220010	9
Piauí	22	Picos	2203	58	Oeiras	220011	9
Piauí	22	Picos	2203	58	Simplício Mendes	220012	7
Piauí	22	São Raimundo Nonato	2204	21	São Raimundo Nonato	220013	13
Piauí	22	São Raimundo Nonato	2204	21	São João do Piauí	220014	8
Piauí	22	Corrente-Bom Jesus	2205	22	Corrente	220015	14
Piauí	22	Corrente-Bom Jesus	2205	22	Bom Jesus	220016	8
Piauí	22	Floriano	2206	28	Floriano	220017	13
Piauí	22	Floriano	2206	28	Uruçuí	220018	7
Piauí	22	Floriano	2206	28	Canto do Buriti	220019	8
Ceará	23	Fortaleza	2301	51	Fortaleza	230001	20
Ceará	23	Fortaleza	2301	51	Itapipoca	230002	7
Ceará	23	Fortaleza	2301	51	Redenção-Acarape	230003	12
Ceará	23	Fortaleza	2301	51	Canindé	230004	6
Ceará	23	Fortaleza	2301	51	Itapajé	230005	6
Ceará	23	Quixadá	2302	31	Quixadá	230006	11
Ceará	23	Quixadá	2302	31	Russas-Limoeiro do Norte	230007	15
Ceará	23	Quixadá	2302	31	Aracati	230008	5
Ceará	23	Iguatu	2303	15	Iguatu	230009	10
Ceará	23	Iguatu	2303	15	Icó	230010	5
Ceará	23	Juazeiro do Norte	2304	30	Juazeiro do Norte	230011	22
Ceará	23	Juazeiro do Norte	2304	30	Brejo Santo	230012	8
Ceará	23	Crateús	2305	13	Crateús	230013	10
Ceará	23	Crateús	2305	13	Tauá	230014	3
Ceará	23	Sobral	2306	44	Sobral	230015	23
Ceará	23	Sobral	2306	44	São Benedito-Ipu-Guaraciaba do Norte- Tianguá	230016	11
Ceará	23	Sobral	2306	44	Acaraú	230017	6
Ceará	23	Sobral	2306	44	Camocim	230018	4
Rio Grande do Norte	24	Natal	2401	75	Natal	240001	24
Rio Grande do Norte	24	Natal	2401	75	Santo Antônio-Passa e Fica- Nova Cruz	240002	13
Rio Grande do Norte	24	Natal	2401	75	Canguaretama	240003	9
Rio Grande do Norte	24	Natal	2401	75	Santa Cruz	240004	9
Rio Grande do Norte	24	Natal	2401	75	João Câmara	240005	10
Rio Grande do Norte	24	Natal	2401	75	São Paulo do Potengi	240006	10
Rio Grande do Norte	24	Caicó	2402	24	Caicó	240007	15
Rio Grande do Norte	24	Caicó	2402	24	Currais Novos	240008	9
Rio Grande do Norte	24	Mossoró	2403	68	Mossoró	240009	17
Rio Grande do Norte	24	Mossoró	2403	68	Pau dos Ferros	240010	34
Rio Grande do Norte	24	Mossoró	2403	68	Açu	240011	17
Paraíba	25	João Pessoa	2501	63	João Pessoa	250001	22
Paraíba	25	João Pessoa	2501	63	Guarabira	250002	26
Paraíba	25	João Pessoa	2501	63	Mamanguape-Rio Tinto	250003	10
Paraíba	25	João Pessoa	2501	63	Itabaiana	250004	5
Paraíba	25	Campina Grande	2502	72	Campina Grande	250005	47
Paraíba	25	Campina Grande	2502	72	Cuité-Nova Floresta	250006	10
Paraíba	25	Campina Grande	2502	72	Monteiro	250007	7
Paraíba	25	Campina Grande	2502	72	Sumé	250008	8
Paraíba	25	Patos	2503	63	Patos	250009	26
Paraíba	25	Patos	2503	63	Itaporanga	250010	15
Paraíba	25	Patos	2503	63	Catolé do Rocha-São Bento	250011	10
Paraíba	25	Patos	2503	63	Pombal	250012	7
Paraíba	25	Patos	2503	63	Princesa Isabel	250013	5
Paraíba	25	Sousa-Cajazeiras	2504	25	Sousa	250014	13
Paraíba	25	Sousa-Cajazeiras	2504	25	Cajazeiras	250015	12
Pernambuco	26	Recife	2601	72	Recife	260001	16
Pernambuco	26	Recife	2601	72	Goiana-Timbaúba	260002	11
Pernambuco	26	Recife	2601	72	Palmares	260003	10
Pernambuco	26	Recife	2601	72	Limoeiro	260004	8
Pernambuco	26	Recife	2601	72	Vitória de Santo Antão	260005	4
Pernambuco	26	Recife	2601	72	Carpina	260006	6
Pernambuco	26	Recife	2601	72	Barreiros-Sirinhaém	260007	5
Pernambuco	26	Recife	2601	72	Surubim	260008	7
Pernambuco	26	Recife	2601	72	Escada-Ribeirão	260018	5
Pernambuco	26	Caruaru	2602	63	Caruaru	260009	23
Pernambuco	26	Caruaru	2602	63	Garanhuns	260010	22
Pernambuco	26	Caruaru	2602	63	Arcoverde	260011	11
Pernambuco	26	Caruaru	2602	63	Belo Jardim-Pesqueira	260012	7
Pernambuco	26	Serra Talhada	2603	25	Serra Talhada	260013	13
Pernambuco	26	Serra Talhada	2603	25	Afogados da Ingazeira	260014	12
Pernambuco	26	Petrolina	2604	25	Petrolina	260015	6
Pernambuco	26	Petrolina	2604	25	Araripina	260016	10
Pernambuco	26	Petrolina	2604	25	Salgueiro	260017	9
Alagoas	27	Maceió	2701	52	Maceió	270001	13
Alagoas	27	Maceió	2701	52	Porto Calvo-São Luís do Quitunde	270002	13
Alagoas	27	Maceió	2701	52	Penedo	270003	7
Alagoas	27	Maceió	2701	52	São Miguel dos Campos	270004	6
Alagoas	27	Maceió	2701	52	União dos Palmares	270005	6
Alagoas	27	Maceió	2701	52	Atalaia	270006	7
Alagoas	27	Arapiraca	2702	50	Arapiraca	270007	17
Alagoas	27	Arapiraca	2702	50	Palmeira dos Índios	270008	9
Alagoas	27	Arapiraca	2702	50	Delmiro Gouveia	270009	7
Alagoas	27	Arapiraca	2702	50	Santana do Ipanema	270010	9
Alagoas	27	Arapiraca	2702	50	Pão de Açúcar-Olho d'Água das Flores- Batalha	270011	8
Sergipe	28	Aracaju	2801	46	Aracaju	280001	20
Sergipe	28	Aracaju	2801	46	Estância	280002	10
Sergipe	28	Aracaju	2801	46	Propriá	280003	16
Sergipe	28	Itabaiana	2802	29	Itabaiana	280004	14
Sergipe	28	Itabaiana	2802	29	Lagarto	280005	6
Sergipe	28	Itabaiana	2802	29	Nossa Senhora da Glória	280006	9
Bahía	29	Salvador	2901	33	Salvador	290001	16
Bahía	29	Salvador	2901	33	Alagoinhas	290002	17
Bahía	29	Santo Antônio de Jesus	2902	41	Santo Antônio de Jesus	290003	14
Bahía	29	Santo Antônio de Jesus	2902	41	Cruz das Almas	290004	12
Bahía	29	Santo Antônio de Jesus	2902	41	Valença	290005	8
Bahía	29	Santo Antônio de Jesus	2902	41	Nazaré-Maragogipe	290006	7
Bahía	29	Ilhéus-Itabuna	2903	51	Ilhéus-Itabuna	290007	22
Bahía	29	Ilhéus-Itabuna	2903	51	Teixeira de Freitas	290008	13
Bahía	29	Ilhéus-Itabuna	2903	51	Eunápolis-Porto Seguro	290009	8
Bahía	29	Ilhéus-Itabuna	2903	51	Camacan	290010	8
Bahía	29	Vitória da Conquista	2904	77	Vitória da Conquista	290011	30
Bahía	29	Vitória da Conquista	2904	77	Jequié	290012	16
Bahía	29	Vitória da Conquista	2904	77	Brumado	290013	12
Bahía	29	Vitória da Conquista	2904	77	Ipiaú	290014	13
Bahía	29	Vitória da Conquista	2904	77	Itapetinga	290015	6
Bahía	29	Guanambi	2905	31	Guanambi	290016	24
Bahía	29	Guanambi	2905	31	Bom Jesus da Lapa	290017	7
Bahía	29	Barreiras	2906	24	Barreiras	290018	17
Bahía	29	Barreiras	2906	24	Santa Maria da Vitória	290019	7
Bahía	29	Irecê	2907	29	Irecê	290020	19
Bahía	29	Irecê	2907	29	Xique-Xique-Barra	290021	10
Bahía	29	Juazeiro	2908	18	Juazeiro	290022	9
Bahía	29	Juazeiro	2908	18	Senhor do Bonfim	290023	9
Bahía	29	Paulo Afonso	2909	30	Paulo Afonso	290024	7
Bahía	29	Paulo Afonso	2909	30	Ribeira do Pombal	290025	7
Bahía	29	Paulo Afonso	2909	30	Euclides da Cunha	290026	5
Bahía	29	Paulo Afonso	2909	30	Cícero Dantas	290027	6
Bahía	29	Paulo Afonso	2909	30	Jeremoabo	290028	5
Bahía	29	Feira de Santana	2910	83	Feira de Santana	290029	33
Bahía	29	Feira de Santana	2910	83	Jacobina	290030	16
Bahía	29	Feira de Santana	2910	83	Itaberaba	290031	12
Bahía	29	Feira de Santana	2910	83	Conceição do Coité	290032	7
Bahía	29	Feira de Santana	2910	83	Serrinha	290033	5
Bahía	29	Feira de Santana	2910	83	Seabra	290034	10

== Central-West ==
Federative unit	UF Code	Intermediate Region	Intermediate Region Code	Number of Municipalities	Immediate Region	Immediate Region Code	Number of Municipalities
Mato Grosso do Sul	50	Campo Grande	5001	32	Campo Grande	500001	13
Mato Grosso do Sul	50	Campo Grande	5001	32	Três Lagoas	500002	6
Mato Grosso do Sul	50	Campo Grande	5001	32	Paranaíba-Chapadão do Sul-Cassilândia	500003	6
Mato Grosso do Sul	50	Campo Grande	5001	32	Coxim	500004	7
Mato Grosso do Sul	50	Dourados	5002	34	Dourados	500005	13
Mato Grosso do Sul	50	Dourados	5002	34	Naviraí-Mundo Novo	500006	6
Mato Grosso do Sul	50	Dourados	5002	34	Nova Andradina	500007	7
Mato Grosso do Sul	50	Dourados	5002	34	Ponta Porã	500008	3
Mato Grosso do Sul	50	Dourados	5002	34	Amambai	500009	5
Mato Grosso do Sul	50	Corumbá	5003	13	Corumbá	500010	2
Mato Grosso do Sul	50	Corumbá	5003	13	Jardim	500011	7
Mato Grosso do Sul	50	Corumbá	5003	13	Aquidauana-Anastácio	500012	4
Mato Grosso	51	Cuiabá	5101	30	Cuiabá	510001	14
Mato Grosso	51	Cuiabá	5101	30	Tangará da Serra	510002	8
Mato Grosso	51	Cuiabá	5101	30	Diamantino	510003	8
Mato Grosso	51	Cáceres	5102	21	Cáceres	510004	5
Mato Grosso	51	Cáceres	5102	21	Pontes e Lacerda-Comodoro	510005	7
Mato Grosso	51	Cáceres	5102	21	Mirassol d'Oeste	510006	9
Mato Grosso	51	Sinop	5103	42	Sinop	510007	12
Mato Grosso	51	Sinop	5103	42	Sorriso	510008	9
Mato Grosso	51	Sinop	5103	42	Juína	510009	7
Mato Grosso	51	Sinop	5103	42	Alta Floresta	510010	6
Mato Grosso	51	Sinop	5103	42	Peixoto de Azevedo-Guarantã do Norte	510011	4
Mato Grosso	51	Sinop	5103	42	Juara	510012	4
Mato Grosso	51	Barra do Garças	5104	30	Barra do Garças	510013	9
Mato Grosso	51	Barra do Garças	5104	30	Confresa-Vila Rica	510014	13
Mato Grosso	51	Barra do Garças	5104	30	Água Boa	510015	8
Mato Grosso	51	Rondonópolis	5105	18	Rondonópolis	510016	10
Mato Grosso	51	Rondonópolis	5105	18	Primavera do Leste	510017	4
Mato Grosso	51	Rondonópolis	5105	18	Jaciara	510018	4
Goiás	52	Goiânia	5201	80	Goiânia	520001	19
Goiás	52	Goiânia	5201	80	Anápolis	520002	18
Goiás	52	Goiânia	5201	80	Inhumas-Itaberaí-Anicuns	520003	13
Goiás	52	Goiânia	5201	80	Catalão	520004	10
Goiás	52	Goiânia	5201	80	Goiás-Itapuranga	520005	15
Goiás	52	Goiânia	5201	80	Pires do Rio	520006	5
Goiás	52	Itumbiara	5202	22	Itumbiara	520007	8
Goiás	52	Itumbiara	5202	22	Caldas Novas-Morrinhos	520008	6
Goiás	52	Itumbiara	5202	22	Piracanjuba	520009	8
Goiás	52	Rio Verde	5203	29	Rio Verde	520010	14
Goiás	52	Rio Verde	5203	29	Jataí-Mineiros	520011	10
Goiás	52	Rio Verde	5203	29	Quirinópolis	520012	5
Goiás	52	São Luís de Montes Belos-Iporá	5204	35	São Luís de Montes Belos	520013	9
Goiás	52	São Luís de Montes Belos-Iporá	5204	35	Iporá	520014	12
Goiás	52	São Luís de Montes Belos-Iporá	5204	35	Palmeiras de Goiás	520015	14
Goiás	52	Porangatu-Uruaçu	5205	46	Porangatu	520016	13
Goiás	52	Porangatu-Uruaçu	5205	46	Uruaçu-Niquelândia	520017	10
Goiás	52	Porangatu-Uruaçu	5205	46	Ceres-Rialma-Goianésia	520018	23
Goiás	52	Luziânia-Águas Lindas de Goiás	5206	34	Luziânia	520019	6
Goiás	52	Luziânia-Águas Lindas de Goiás	5206	34	Águas Lindas de Goiás	520020	7
Goiás	52	Luziânia-Águas Lindas de Goiás	5206	34	Posse-Campos Belos	520021	14
Goiás	52	Luziânia-Águas Lindas de Goiás	5206	34	Flores de Goiás	520022	7
Federal District	53	Distrito Federal	5301	1	Distrito Federal	530001	1

== Southeast ==
Federative unit	UF Code	Intermediate Region	Intermediate Region Code	Number of Municipalities	Immediate Region	Immediate Region Code	Number of Municipalities
Minas Gerais	31	Belo Horizonte	3101	74	Belo Horizonte	310001	29
Minas Gerais	31	Belo Horizonte	3101	74	Sete Lagoas	310002	19
Minas Gerais	31	Belo Horizonte	3101	74	Santa Bárbara-Ouro Preto	310003	6
Minas Gerais	31	Belo Horizonte	3101	74	Curvelo	310004	11
Minas Gerais	31	Belo Horizonte	3101	74	Itabira	310005	9
Minas Gerais	31	Montes Claros	3102	86	Montes Claros	310006	32
Minas Gerais	31	Montes Claros	3102	86	Janaúba	310007	11
Minas Gerais	31	Montes Claros	3102	86	Salinas	310008	14
Minas Gerais	31	Montes Claros	3102	86	Januária	310009	8
Minas Gerais	31	Montes Claros	3102	86	Pirapora	310010	7
Minas Gerais	31	Montes Claros	3102	86	São Francisco	310011	6
Minas Gerais	31	Montes Claros	3102	86	Espinosa	310012	8
Minas Gerais	31	Teófilo Otoni	3103	86	Teófilo Otoni	310013	27
Minas Gerais	31	Teófilo Otoni	3103	86	Capelinha	310014	10
Minas Gerais	31	Teófilo Otoni	3103	86	Almenara	310015	14
Minas Gerais	31	Teófilo Otoni	3103	86	Diamantina	310016	13
Minas Gerais	31	Teófilo Otoni	3103	86	Araçuaí	310017	8
Minas Gerais	31	Teófilo Otoni	3103	86	Pedra Azul	310018	7
Minas Gerais	31	Teófilo Otoni	3103	86	Águas Formosas	310019	7
Minas Gerais	31	Governador Valadares	3104	58	Governador Valadares	310020	26
Minas Gerais	31	Governador Valadares	3104	58	Guanhães	310021	20
Minas Gerais	31	Governador Valadares	3104	58	Mantena	310022	7
Minas Gerais	31	Governador Valadares	3104	58	Aimorés-Resplendor	310023	5
Minas Gerais	31	Ipatinga	3105	44	Ipatinga	310024	22
Minas Gerais	31	Ipatinga	3105	44	Caratinga	310025	16
Minas Gerais	31	Ipatinga	3105	44	João Monlevade	310026	6
Minas Gerais	31	Juiz de Fora	3106	146	Juiz de Fora	310027	29
Minas Gerais	31	Juiz de Fora	3106	146	Manhuaçu	310028	24
Minas Gerais	31	Juiz de Fora	3106	146	Ubá	310029	17
Minas Gerais	31	Juiz de Fora	3106	146	Ponte Nova	310030	19
Minas Gerais	31	Juiz de Fora	3106	146	Muriaé	310031	12
Minas Gerais	31	Juiz de Fora	3106	146	Cataguases	310032	10
Minas Gerais	31	Juiz de Fora	3106	146	Viçosa	310033	12
Minas Gerais	31	Juiz de Fora	3106	146	Carangola	310034	9
Minas Gerais	31	Juiz de Fora	3106	146	São João Nepomuceno-Bicas	310035	9
Minas Gerais	31	Juiz de Fora	3106	146	Além Paraíba	310036	5
Minas Gerais	31	Barbacena	3107	49	Barbacena	310037	14
Minas Gerais	31	Barbacena	3107	49	Conselheiro Lafaiete	310038	21
Minas Gerais	31	Barbacena	3107	49	São João del-Rei	310039	14
Minas Gerais	31	Varginha	3108	82	Varginha	310040	5
Minas Gerais	31	Varginha	3108	82	Passos	310041	15
Minas Gerais	31	Varginha	3108	82	Alfenas	310042	13
Minas Gerais	31	Varginha	3108	82	Lavras	310043	14
Minas Gerais	31	Varginha	3108	82	Guaxupé	310044	9
Minas Gerais	31	Varginha	3108	82	Três Corações	310045	6
Minas Gerais	31	Varginha	3108	82	Três Pontas-Boa Esperança	310046	5
Minas Gerais	31	Varginha	3108	82	São Sebastião do Paraíso	310047	5
Minas Gerais	31	Varginha	3108	82	Campo Belo	310048	5
Minas Gerais	31	Varginha	3108	82	Piumhi	310049	5
Minas Gerais	31	Pouso Alegre	3109	80	Pouso Alegre	310050	34
Minas Gerais	31	Pouso Alegre	3109	80	Poços de Caldas	310051	8
Minas Gerais	31	Pouso Alegre	3109	80	Itajubá	310052	14
Minas Gerais	31	Pouso Alegre	3109	80	São Lourenço	310053	16
Minas Gerais	31	Pouso Alegre	3109	80	Caxambu-Baependi	310054	8
Minas Gerais	31	Uberaba	3110	29	Uberaba	310055	10
Minas Gerais	31	Uberaba	3110	29	Araxá	310056	8
Minas Gerais	31	Uberaba	3110	29	Frutal	310057	6
Minas Gerais	31	Uberaba	3110	29	Iturama	310058	5
Minas Gerais	31	Uberlândia	3111	24	Uberlândia	310059	11
Minas Gerais	31	Uberlândia	3111	24	Ituiutaba	310060	6
Minas Gerais	31	Uberlândia	3111	24	Monte Carmelo	310061	7
Minas Gerais	31	Patos de Minas	3112	34	Patos de Minas	310062	18
Minas Gerais	31	Patos de Minas	3112	34	Unaí	310063	11
Minas Gerais	31	Patos de Minas	3112	34	Patrocínio	310064	5
Minas Gerais	31	Divinópolis	3113	61	Divinópolis	310065	20
Minas Gerais	31	Divinópolis	3113	61	Formiga	310066	10
Minas Gerais	31	Divinópolis	3113	61	Dores do Indaiá	310067	9
Minas Gerais	31	Divinópolis	3113	61	Pará de Minas	310068	7
Minas Gerais	31	Divinópolis	3113	61	Oliveira	310069	10
Minas Gerais	31	Divinópolis	3113	61	Abaeté	310070	5
Espírito Santo	32	Vitória	3201	21	Vitória	320001	10
Espírito Santo	32	Vitória	3201	21	Afonso Cláudio-Venda Nova do Imigrante- Santa Maria de Jetibá	320002	11
Espírito Santo	32	São Mateus	3202	15	São Mateus	320003	9
Espírito Santo	32	São Mateus	3202	15	Linhares	320004	6
Espírito Santo	32	Colatina	3203	18	Colatina	320005	13
Espírito Santo	32	Colatina	3203	18	Nova Venécia	320006	5
Espírito Santo	32	Cachoeiro de Itapemirim	3204	24	Cachoeiro de Itapemirim	320007	12
Espírito Santo	32	Cachoeiro de Itapemirim	3204	24	Alegre	320008	12
Rio de Janeiro	33	Rio de Janeiro	3301	26	Rio de Janeiro	330001	21
Rio de Janeiro	33	Rio de Janeiro	3301	26	Angra dos Reis	330002	2
Rio de Janeiro	33	Rio de Janeiro	3301	26	Rio Bonito	330003	3
Rio de Janeiro	33	Volta Redonda-Barra Mansa	3302	17	Volta Redonda-Barra Mansa	330004	8
Rio de Janeiro	33	Volta Redonda-Barra Mansa	3302	17	Resende	330005	4
Rio de Janeiro	33	Volta Redonda-Barra Mansa	3302	17	Valença	330006	5
Rio de Janeiro	33	Petrópolis	3303	19	Petrópolis	330007	4
Rio de Janeiro	33	Petrópolis	3303	19	Nova Friburgo	330008	11
Rio de Janeiro	33	Petrópolis	3303	19	Três Rios-Paraíba do Sul	330009	4
Rio de Janeiro	33	Campos dos Goytacazes	3304	18	Campos dos Goytacazes	330010	6
Rio de Janeiro	33	Campos dos Goytacazes	3304	18	Itaperuna	330011	7
Rio de Janeiro	33	Campos dos Goytacazes	3304	18	Santo Antônio de Pádua	330012	5
Rio de Janeiro	33	Macaé-Rio das Ostras-Cabo Frio	3305	12	Cabo Frio	330013	6
Rio de Janeiro	33	Macaé-Rio das Ostras-Cabo Frio	3305	12	Macaé-Rio das Ostras	330014	6
São Paulo	35	São Paulo	3501	50	São Paulo	350001	39
São Paulo	35	São Paulo	3501	50	Santos	350002	11
São Paulo	35	Sorocaba	3502	78	Sorocaba	350003	22
São Paulo	35	Sorocaba	3502	78	Itapeva	350004	19
São Paulo	35	Sorocaba	3502	78	Registro	350005	13
São Paulo	35	Sorocaba	3502	78	Itapetininga	350006	6
São Paulo	35	Sorocaba	3502	78	Avaré	350007	12
São Paulo	35	Sorocaba	3502	78	Tatuí	350008	6
São Paulo	35	Bauru	3503	48	Bauru	350009	19
São Paulo	35	Bauru	3503	48	Jaú	350010	12
São Paulo	35	Bauru	3503	48	Botucatu	350011	9
São Paulo	35	Bauru	3503	48	Lins	350012	8
São Paulo	35	Marília	3504	54	Marília	350013	18
São Paulo	35	Marília	3504	54	Assis	350014	12
São Paulo	35	Marília	3504	54	Ourinhos	350015	11
São Paulo	35	Marília	3504	54	Tupã	350016	8
São Paulo	35	Marília	3504	54	Piraju	350017	5
São Paulo	35	Presidente Prudente	3505	55	Presidente Prudente	350018	28
São Paulo	35	Presidente Prudente	3505	55	Adamantina-Lucélia	350019	10
São Paulo	35	Presidente Prudente	3505	55	Dracena	350020	12
São Paulo	35	Presidente Prudente	3505	55	Presidente Epitácio-Presidente Venceslau	350021	5
São Paulo	35	Araçatuba	3506	44	Araçatuba	350022	14
São Paulo	35	Araçatuba	3506	44	Birigui-Penápolis	350023	19
São Paulo	35	Araçatuba	3506	44	Andradina	350024	11
São Paulo	35	São José do Rio Preto	3507	100	São José do Rio Preto	350025	36
São Paulo	35	São José do Rio Preto	3507	100	Catanduva	350026	16
São Paulo	35	São José do Rio Preto	3507	100	Votuporanga	350027	12
São Paulo	35	São José do Rio Preto	3507	100	Jales	350028	18
São Paulo	35	São José do Rio Preto	3507	100	Fernandópolis	350029	11
São Paulo	35	São José do Rio Preto	3507	100	Santa Fé do Sul	350030	7
São Paulo	35	Ribeirão Preto	3508	64	Ribeirão Preto	350031	26
São Paulo	35	Ribeirão Preto	3508	64	Barretos	350032	16
São Paulo	35	Ribeirão Preto	3508	64	Franca	350033	10
São Paulo	35	Ribeirão Preto	3508	64	São Joaquim da Barra-Orlândia	350034	6
São Paulo	35	Ribeirão Preto	3508	64	Ituverava	350035	6
São Paulo	35	Araraquara	3509	26	Araraquara	350036	17
São Paulo	35	Araraquara	3509	26	São Carlos	350037	9
São Paulo	35	Campinas	3510	87	Campinas	350038	18
São Paulo	35	Campinas	3510	87	Jundiaí	350039	9
São Paulo	35	Campinas	3510	87	Piracicaba	350040	11
São Paulo	35	Campinas	3510	87	Bragança Paulista	350041	11
São Paulo	35	Campinas	3510	87	Limeira	350042	4
São Paulo	35	Campinas	3510	87	Mogi Guaçu	350043	4
São Paulo	35	Campinas	3510	87	São João da Boa Vista	350044	9
São Paulo	35	Campinas	3510	87	Araras	350045	4
São Paulo	35	Campinas	3510	87	Rio Claro	350046	5
São Paulo	35	Campinas	3510	87	São José do Rio Pardo-Mococa	350047	7
São Paulo	35	Campinas	3510	87	Amparo	350048	5
São Paulo	35	São José dos Campos	3511	39	São José dos Campos	350049	8
São Paulo	35	São José dos Campos	3511	39	Taubaté-Pindamonhangaba	350050	10
São Paulo	35	São José dos Campos	3511	39	Caraguatatuba-Ubatuba-São Sebastião	350051	4
São Paulo	35	São José dos Campos	3511	39	Guaratinguetá	350052	8
São Paulo	35	São José dos Campos	3511	39	Cruzeiro	350053	9

== South ==
Federative unit	UF Code	Intermediate Region	Intermediate Region Code	Number of Municipalities	Immediate Region	Immediate Region Code	Number of Municipalities
Paraná	41	Curitiba	4101	45	Curitiba	410001	29
Paraná	41	Curitiba	4101	45	Paranaguá	410002	7
Paraná	41	Curitiba	4101	45	União da Vitória	410003	9
Paraná	41	Guarapuava	4102	19	Guarapuava	410004	12
Paraná	41	Guarapuava	4102	19	Pitanga	410005	7
Paraná	41	Cascavel	4103	100	Cascavel	410006	23
Paraná	41	Cascavel	4103	100	Foz do Iguaçu	410007	7
Paraná	41	Cascavel	4103	100	Toledo	410008	14
Paraná	41	Cascavel	4103	100	Francisco Beltrão	410009	21
Paraná	41	Cascavel	4103	100	Pato Branco	410010	15
Paraná	41	Cascavel	4103	100	Laranjeiras do Sul-Quedas do Iguaçu	410011	8
Paraná	41	Cascavel	4103	100	Dois Vizinhos	410012	6
Paraná	41	Cascavel	4103	100	Marechal Cândido Rondon	410013	6
Paraná	41	Maringá	4104	115	Maringá	410014	23
Paraná	41	Maringá	4104	115	Campo Mourão	410015	24
Paraná	41	Maringá	4104	115	Umuarama	410016	22
Paraná	41	Maringá	4104	115	Paranavaí	410017	17
Paraná	41	Maringá	4104	115	Cianorte	410018	11
Paraná	41	Maringá	4104	115	Paranacity-Colorado	410019	11
Paraná	41	Maringá	4104	115	Loanda	410020	7
Paraná	41	Londrina	4105	94	Londrina	410021	23
Paraná	41	Londrina	4105	94	Santo Antônio da Platina	410022	19
Paraná	41	Londrina	4105	94	Apucarana	410023	13
Paraná	41	Londrina	4105	94	Cornélio Procópio-Bandeirantes	410024	18
Paraná	41	Londrina	4105	94	Ivaiporã	410025	15
Paraná	41	Londrina	4105	94	Ibaiti	410026	6
Paraná	41	Ponta Grossa	4106	26	Ponta Grossa	410027	12
Paraná	41	Ponta Grossa	4106	26	Telêmaco Borba	410028	7
Paraná	41	Ponta Grossa	4106	26	Irati	410029	7
Santa Catarina	42	Florianópolis	4201	17	Florianópolis	420001	17
Santa Catarina	42	Criciúma	4202	44	Criciúma	420002	13
Santa Catarina	42	Criciúma	4202	44	Tubarão	420003	17
Santa Catarina	42	Criciúma	4202	44	Araranguá	420004	14
Santa Catarina	42	Lages	4203	24	Lages	420005	18
Santa Catarina	42	Lages	4203	24	Curitibanos	420006	6
Santa Catarina	42	Chapecó	4204	109	Chapecó	420007	32
Santa Catarina	42	Chapecó	4204	109	Joaçaba-Herval d'Oeste	420008	18
Santa Catarina	42	Chapecó	4204	109	São Miguel do Oeste	420009	20
Santa Catarina	42	Chapecó	4204	109	Concórdia	420010	12
Santa Catarina	42	Chapecó	4204	109	Xanxerê	420011	13
Santa Catarina	42	Chapecó	4204	109	Maravilha	420012	8
Santa Catarina	42	Chapecó	4204	109	São Lourenço do Oeste	420013	6
Santa Catarina	42	Caçador	4205	16	Caçador	420014	6
Santa Catarina	42	Caçador	4205	16	Videira	420015	10
Santa Catarina	42	Joinville	4206	25	Joinville	420016	12
Santa Catarina	42	Joinville	4206	25	Mafra	420017	10
Santa Catarina	42	Joinville	4206	25	São Bento do Sul-Rio Negrinho	420018	3
Santa Catarina	42	Blumenau	4207	60	Blumenau	420019	12
Santa Catarina	42	Blumenau	4207	60	Itajaí	420020	12
Santa Catarina	42	Blumenau	4207	60	Brusque	420021	7
Santa Catarina	42	Blumenau	4207	60	Rio do Sul	420022	17
Santa Catarina	42	Blumenau	4207	60	Ibirama-Presidente Getúlio	420023	6
Santa Catarina	42	Blumenau	4207	60	Ituporanga	420024	6
Rio Grande do Sul	43	Porto Alegre	4301	90	Porto Alegre	430001	23
Rio Grande do Sul	43	Porto Alegre	4301	90	Novo Hamburgo-São Leopoldo	430002	22
Rio Grande do Sul	43	Porto Alegre	4301	90	Tramandaí-Osório	430003	10
Rio Grande do Sul	43	Porto Alegre	4301	90	Taquara-Parobé-Igrejinha	430004	6
Rio Grande do Sul	43	Porto Alegre	4301	90	Camaquã	430005	9
Rio Grande do Sul	43	Porto Alegre	4301	90	Charqueadas-Triunfo-São Jerônimo	430006	6
Rio Grande do Sul	43	Porto Alegre	4301	90	Montenegro	430007	7
Rio Grande do Sul	43	Porto Alegre	4301	90	Torres	430008	7
Rio Grande do Sul	43	Pelotas	4302	24	Pelotas	430009	17
Rio Grande do Sul	43	Pelotas	4302	24	Bagé	430010	7
Rio Grande do Sul	43	Santa Maria	4303	40	Santa Maria	430011	25
Rio Grande do Sul	43	Santa Maria	4303	40	São Gabriel-Caçapava do Sul	430012	6
Rio Grande do Sul	43	Santa Maria	4303	40	Cachoeira do Sul	430013	4
Rio Grande do Sul	43	Santa Maria	4303	40	Santiago	430014	5
Rio Grande do Sul	43	Uruguaiana	4304	10	Uruguaiana	430015	4
Rio Grande do Sul	43	Uruguaiana	4304	10	Santana do Livramento	430016	3
Rio Grande do Sul	43	Uruguaiana	4304	10	São Borja	430017	3
Rio Grande do Sul	43	Ijuí	4305	77	Ijuí	430018	16
Rio Grande do Sul	43	Ijuí	4305	77	Santa Rosa	430019	12
Rio Grande do Sul	43	Ijuí	4305	77	Santo Ângelo	430020	8
Rio Grande do Sul	43	Ijuí	4305	77	Três Passos	430021	16
Rio Grande do Sul	43	Ijuí	4305	77	São Luiz Gonzaga	430022	9
Rio Grande do Sul	43	Ijuí	4305	77	Três de Maio	430023	8
Rio Grande do Sul	43	Ijuí	4305	77	Cerro Largo	430024	8
Rio Grande do Sul	43	Passo Fundo	4306	144	Passo Fundo	430025	16
Rio Grande do Sul	43	Passo Fundo	4306	144	Erechim	430026	30
Rio Grande do Sul	43	Passo Fundo	4306	144	Cruz Alta	430027	11
Rio Grande do Sul	43	Passo Fundo	4306	144	Carazinho	430028	15
Rio Grande do Sul	43	Passo Fundo	4306	144	Frederico Westphalen	430029	18
Rio Grande do Sul	43	Passo Fundo	4306	144	Marau	430030	12
Rio Grande do Sul	43	Passo Fundo	4306	144	Soledade	430031	8
Rio Grande do Sul	43	Passo Fundo	4306	144	Tapejara-Sananduva	430032	11
Rio Grande do Sul	43	Passo Fundo	4306	144	Lagoa Vermelha	430033	9
Rio Grande do Sul	43	Passo Fundo	4306	144	Palmeira das Missões	430034	8
Rio Grande do Sul	43	Passo Fundo	4306	144	Nonoai	430035	6
Rio Grande do Sul	43	Caxias do Sul	4307	54	Caxias do Sul	430036	18
Rio Grande do Sul	43	Caxias do Sul	4307	54	Bento Gonçalves	430037	14
Rio Grande do Sul	43	Caxias do Sul	4307	54	Nova Prata-Guaporé	430038	14
Rio Grande do Sul	43	Caxias do Sul	4307	54	Vacaria	430039	8
Rio Grande do Sul	43	Santa Cruz do Sul-Lajeado	4308	58	Santa Cruz do Sul	430040	14
Rio Grande do Sul	43	Santa Cruz do Sul-Lajeado	4308	58	Lajeado	430041	25
Rio Grande do Sul	43	Santa Cruz do Sul-Lajeado	4308	58	Sobradinho	430042	9
Rio Grande do Sul	43	Santa Cruz do Sul-Lajeado	4308	58	Encantado	430043	10

== See also ==
- List of Intermediate and Immediate Geographic Regions of Minas Gerais
