= List of Intermediate and Immediate Geographic Regions of Minas Gerais =

The state of Minas Gerais, in Brazil, has 13 intermediate geographic regions. They are divided in 70 immediate geographic regions according to IBGE (2017).

== Intermediate Geographic Region of Belo Horizonte ==
The Intermediate Geographic Region of Belo Horizonte has 74 municipalities, distributed in 5 immediate geographic regions.

- Immediate Geographic Region of Belo Horizonte: 29 municipalities.
- Immediate Geographic Region of Curvelo: 11 municipalities.
- Immediate Geographic Region of Itabira: 9 municipalities.
- Immediate Geographic Region of Santa Bárbara-Ouro Preto: 6 municipalities.
- Immediate Geographic Region of Sete Lagoas: 19 municipalities.

== Intermediate Geographic Region of Montes Claros ==
The Intermediate Geographic Region of Montes Claros has 87 municipalities, distributed in 7 immediate geographic regions.

- Immediate Geographic Region of Montes Claros: 32 municipalities
- Immediate Geographic Region of Janaúba: 11 municipalities
- Immediate Geographic Region of Januária: 8 municipalities
- Immediate Geographic Region of Espinosa: 8 municipalities
- Immediate Geographic Region of Salinas: 14 municipalities
- Immediate Geographic Region of Pirapora: 7 municipalities
- Immediate Geographic Region of São Francisco: 6 municipalities.

== Intermediate Geographic Region of Teófilo Otoni ==
The Intermediate Geographic Region of Teófilo Otoni has 86 municipalities, distributed in 7 immediate geographic regions.

- Immediate Geographic Region of Teófilo Otoni: 27 municipalities.
- Immediate Geographic Region of Almenara: 14 municipalities.
- Immediate Geographic Region of Pedra Azul: 7 municipalities.
- Immediate Geographic Region of Araçuaí: 8 municipalities.
- Immediate Geographic Region of Capelinha: 10 municipalities.
- Immediate Geographic Region of Águas Formosas: 7 municipalities.
- Immediate Geographic Region of Diamantina: 13 municipalities.

== Intermediate Geographic Region of Governador Valadares ==
The Intermediate Geographic Region of Governador Valadares has 58 municipalities, distributed in 4 immediate geographic regions.

- Immediate Geographic Region of Governador Valadares: 26 municipalities.
- Immediate Geographic Region of Guanhães: 20 municipalities.
- Immediate Geographic Region of Mantena: 7 municipalities.
- Immediate Geographic Region of Aimorés-Resplendor: 5 municipalities.

== Intermediate Geographic Region of Ipatinga ==
The Intermediate Geographic Region of Ipatinga has 44 municipalities, distributed in 3 immediate geographic regions.

- Immediate Geographic Region of Ipatinga: 22 municipalities.
- Immediate Geographic Region of Caratinga: 16 municipalities.
- Immediate Geographic Region of João Monlevade: 6 municipalities.

== Intermediate Geographic Region of Juiz de Fora ==
The Intermediate Geographic Region of Juiz de Fora has 146 municipalities, distributed in 10 immediate geographic regions.

- Immediate Geographic Region of Juiz de Fora: 29 municipalities.
- Immediate Geographic Region of Ubá: 17 municipalities.
- Immediate Geographic Region of Muriaé: 12 municipalities.
- Immediate Geographic Region of Viçosa: 12 municipalities.
- Immediate Geographic Region of Carangola: 9 municipalities.
- Immediate Geographic Region of Cataguases: 10 municipalities.
- Immediate Geographic Region of São João Nepomuceno-Bicas: 9 municipalities.
- Immediate Geographic Region of Ponte Nova: 19 municipalities.
- Immediate Geographic Region of Além Paraíba: 5 municipalities.
- Immediate Geographic Region of Manhuaçu: 24 municipalities.

== Intermediate Geographic Region of Barbacena ==
The Intermediate Geographic Region of Barbacena has 49 municipalities, distributed in 3 immediate geographic regions.

- Immediate Geographic Region of Barbacena: 14 municipalities.
- Immediate Geographic Region of Conselheiro Lafaiete: 21 municipalities.
- Immediate Geographic Region of São João del-Rei: 14 municipalities.

== Intermediate Geographic Region of Varginha ==
The Intermediate Geographic Region of Varginha has 82 municipalities, distributed in 10 immediate geographic regions.

- Immediate Geographic Region of Varginha: 5 municipalities.
- Immediate Geographic Region of Lavras: 14 municipalities.
- Immediate Geographic Region of Alfenas: 13 municipalities.
- Immediate Geographic Region of Três Corações: 6 municipalities.
- Immediate Geographic Region of São Sebastião do Paraíso: 5 municipalities.
- Immediate Geographic Region of Campo Belo: 5 municipalities.
- Immediate Geographic Region of Guaxupé: 9 municipalities.
- Immediate Geographic Region of Passos: 15 municipalities.
- Immediate Geographic Region of Piumhi: 5 municipalities.
- Immediate Geographic Region of Três Pontas-Boa Esperança: 5 municipalities.

== Intermediate Geographic Region of Pouso Alegre ==
The Intermediate Geographic Region of Pouso Alegre has 80 municipalities, distributed in 5 immediate geographic regions.

- Immediate Geographic Region of Pouso Alegre: 34 municipalities.
- Immediate Geographic Region of São Lourenço: 16 municipalities.
- Immediate Geographic Region of Poços de Caldas: 8 municipalities.
- Immediate Geographic Region of Itajubá: 14 municipalities.
- Immediate Geographic Region of Caxambu-Baependi: 8 municipalities.

== Intermediate Geographic Region of Uberaba ==
The Intermediate Geographic Region of Uberaba has 29 municipalities, distributed in 4 immediate geographic regions.

- Immediate Geographic Region of Uberaba: 10 municipalities.
- Immediate Geographic Region of Araxá: 8 municipalities.
- Immediate Geographic Region of Frutal: 6 municipalities.
- Immediate Geographic Region of Iturama: 5 municipalities.

== Intermediate Geographic Region of Uberlândia ==
The Intermediate Geographic Region of Uberlândia has 24 municipalities, distributed in 3 immediate geographic regions.

- Immediate Geographic Region of Uberlândia: 11 municipalities.
- Immediate Geographic Region of Ituiutaba: 6 municipalities.
- Immediate Geographic Region of Monte Carmelo: 7 municipalities.

== Intermediate Geographic Region of Patos de Minas ==
The Intermediate Geographic Region of Patos de Minas has 34 municipalities, distributed in 3 immediate geographic regions.

- Immediate Geographic Region of Patos de Minas: 18 municipalities.
- Immediate Geographic Region of Unaí: 11 municipalities.
- Immediate Geographic Region of Patrocínio: 5 municipalities.

== Intermediate Geographic Region of Divinópolis ==
The Intermediate Geographic Region of Divinópolis has 61 municipalities, distributed in 6 immediate geographic regions.

- Immediate Geographic Region of Divinópolis: 20 municipalities.
- Immediate Geographic Region of Abaeté: 5 municipalities.
- Immediate Geographic Region of Pará de Minas: 7 municipalities.
- Immediate Geographic Region of Formiga: 10 municipalities.
- Immediate Geographic Region of Oliveira: 10 municipalities.
- Immediate Geographic Region of Dores do Indaiá: 9 municipalities.
