= Caputira =

Municipality in Minas Gerais, Brazil

Coordinates: 20°10′S 42°16′W

- Municipality
- Município de Caputira
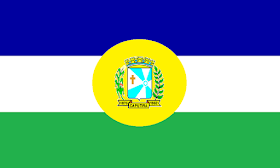
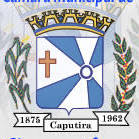
- Flag Coat of arms
- Interactive map of Caputira
- Country: Brazil
- State: Minas Gerais
- Region: Southeast
- Intermediate Region: Juiz de Fora
- Immediate Region: Manhuaçu
- Founded: 1962

Government
  - Prefeito: Edgar Geraldo de Araújo (PSDB)
  - Term: 2025–2028

Area
  - Total: 187.704 km^{2} (72.473 sq mi)
- Elevation: 570 m (1,870 ft)

Population (2022 Census)
  - Total: 8,936
  - Density: 47.61/km^{2} (123.3/sq mi)
- Demonym: caputirense
- Time zone: UTC−3 (BRT)
- CEP: 36925-000
- HDI (2010): 0.615 (medium)
- Population estimate (2026): 9,128
- Website: caputira.mg.gov.br

Location of Caputira within Minas Gerais

Caputira is a municipality in the state of Minas Gerais, Brazil. The city belongs to the mesoregion of Zona da Mata and the microregion of Manhuaçu. As of 2020, the estimated population was 9,308.

== Geography and environment ==
Caputira covers an area of 187.704 square kilometres (72.473 sq mi) within the mountainous Zona da Mata socio-geographic subregion of southeastern Minas Gerais. The municipal landscape is highly rugged, with the urban administrative center built at an average elevation of 570 metres (1,870 ft) above sea level. The local climate is classified as humid subtropical, featuring warm, rainy summers and distinct dry winters. Hydrologically, Caputira's local streams drain into the broader Paraíba do Sul river basin, which serves as a major watershed for southeastern Brazil.

== History ==
The territory of Caputira began developing during the 19th century as a prominent rest stop for muleteers (tropeiros) transporting goods through the interior of Minas Gerais. The initial settlement was known as Santa Helena da Cabeluda, a colloquial name referencing a prominent local tree species covered in moss.

The settlement underwent multiple administrative and name changes across the late 19th and early 20th centuries:

- 1868: The community grew into an official district under the name São Francisco do Vermelho.
- 1875: The area was reorganized and renamed Santa Helena do Manhuaçu.
- 1923–1943: The district briefly adopted the name Amazonita before reverting to its historic title, and was eventually placed under the municipal jurisdiction of neighboring Matipó.
- 1962: On 30 December 1962, the district achieved full political emancipation to become an independent municipality. It officially adopted the name Caputira, a Tupi-Guarani term translated as "flowering clearing" or "flower of the field".

== Economy ==
The local economy is heavily dependent on agribusiness, with a particular specialization in mountain coffee cultivation (cafeicultura). The high-altitude terrain, well-drained volcanic soils, and subtropical microclimate create ideal conditions for growing high-grade Arabica coffee.

Local agricultural producers focus on specialty crops, including the climate-resilient Catucaí Amarelo bean variety, which is hand-harvested on steep slopes throughout the rural sectors of the municipality. The raw coffee yields are gathered and distributed through regional agricultural cooperatives based in the Immediate Geographic Region of Manhuaçu, providing the primary source of employment and domestic tax revenue for the municipality.

== Culture and sports ==
The municipality hosts localized amateur football tournaments at the Municipal Stadium (Estádio Municipal), which serves as the primary hub for regional sports leagues and youth athletic programs.

== See also ==
- List of municipalities in Minas Gerais
