= Abaeté =

Municipality in Minas Gerais, Brazil

- Municipality
- Municipality of Abaeté
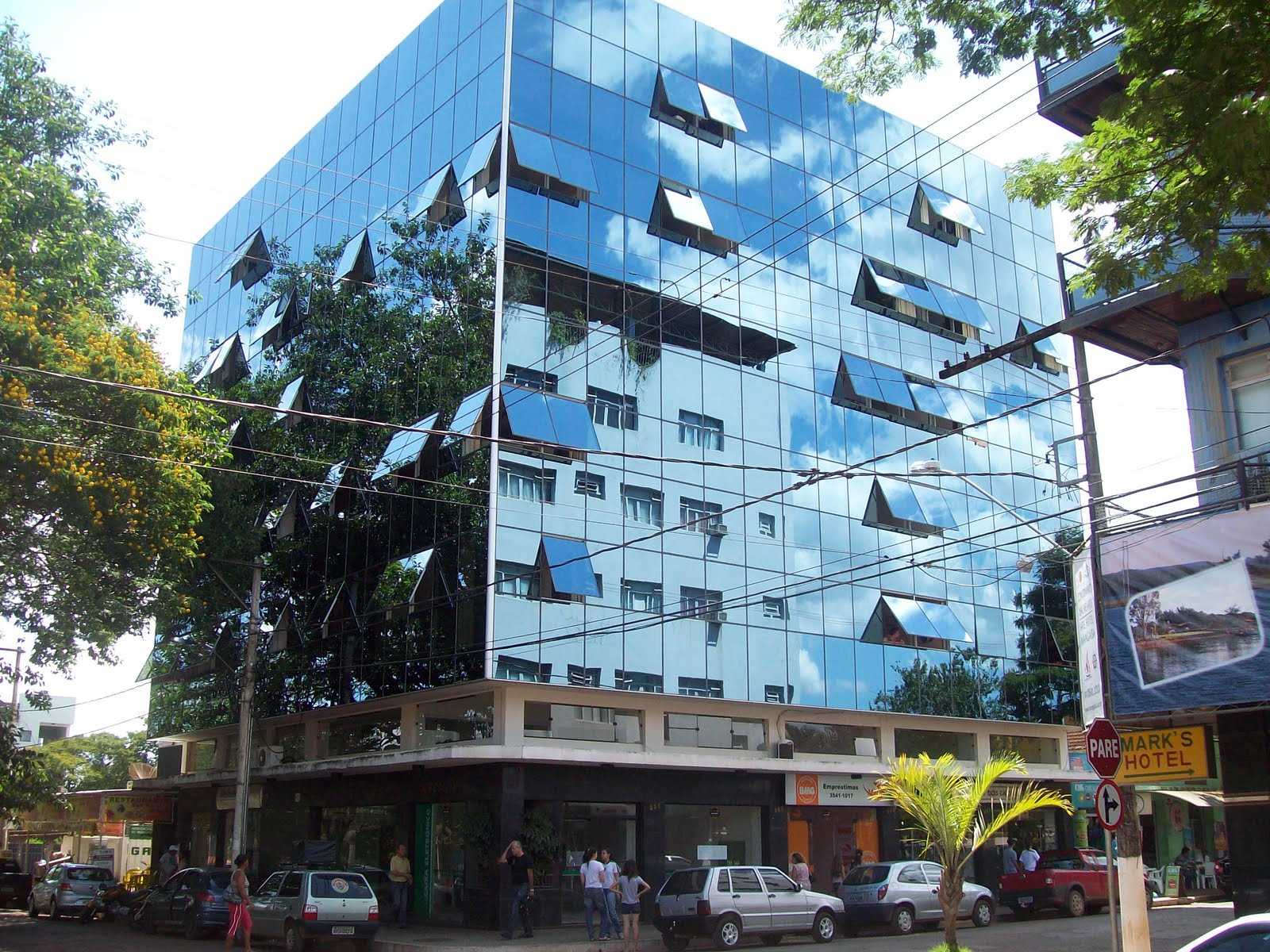
- Street in central Abaeté

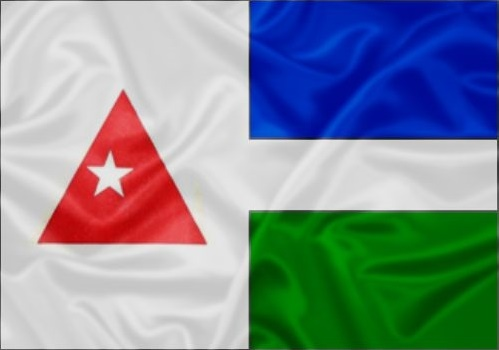
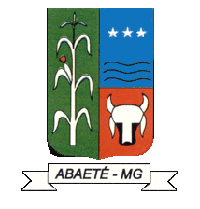
- Flag Coat of arms

- Location in Minas Gerais

- Location in Minas Gerais Location in Brazil
- Coordinates: 19°09′30″S 45°27′08″W
- Country: Brazil
- Region: Southeast
- State: Minas Gerais
- Intermediate region: Divinópolis
- Immediate region: Abaeté
- Municipality created: September 15, 1870
- Municipality installed: January 11, 1873
- City status: November 5, 1877

Government
  - Mayor: Ivanir Deladier da Costa (MDB)
  - Term: 2025–2028

Area
  - Total: 1,817.067 km^{2} (701.573 sq mi)
- Elevation: 647 m (2,123 ft)

Population (2022 census)
  - Total: 22,675
  - Estimate (2025): 23,173
  - Density: 12.479/km^{2} (32.320/sq mi)
- Demonym: abaeteense
- Time zone: UTC−3 (BRT)
- Postal code: 35620-000 to 35620-999
- Area code: 37
- HDI (2010): 0.698 (medium)
- GDP per capita (2023): R$28,311.84
- Website: abaete.mg.gov.br

Abaeté is a municipality in central Minas Gerais, Brazil. It had a population of 22,675 in the 2022 census, with an estimated population of 23,173 in 2025, in an area of 1,817.067 km^{2} (701.573 sq mi). It is part of the Immediate Geographic Region of Abaeté, within the Intermediate Geographic Region of Divinópolis. The municipality was created in 1870 and received city status in 1877.

== Geography ==
Abaeté covers 1,817.067 km^{2} (701.573 sq mi) in central Minas Gerais. The municipal seat lies at an elevation of 647 m (2,123 ft).

=== Relief and soils ===
The municipality lies in the upper São Francisco River region, near the Serra da Mata da Corda plateau. Its landscape combines elevated plateau surfaces with more dissected and undulating terrain around the valleys. Cambisols and red Latosols are common. These soils are generally acidic, with low base saturation, and contain varying concentrations of iron and aluminium oxides.

=== Hydrography ===
Abaeté lies entirely within the São Francisco River basin. Its territory extends across two of Minas Gerais's water-management regions: the Afluentes do Alto São Francisco basin, known as SF1, and the basin surrounding the Três Marias Reservoir, known as SF4. The Ribeirão Marmelada crosses the urban area, while the wider drainage network flows toward the São Francisco River and the Três Marias Reservoir.

=== Climate and vegetation ===
Abaeté has warm, rainy summers and a pronounced dry season during the winter. Its climate is classified as Cwa under the Köppen climate classification, with average annual precipitation of about 1,400 mm (55 in).

The municipality lies within the Cerrado biome. Its native vegetation includes several forms of cerrado, including cerrado sensu stricto, together with gallery forest and riparian woodland along streams. More humid areas contain transitional patches of secondary forest.

== Etymology ==
The name Abaeté comes from the Tupi words abá, meaning "person" or "man", and eté, meaning "true". It is commonly translated as "true man". The settlement was formerly known as Marmelada or Nossa Senhora do Patrocínio do Marmelada.

== Economy ==
The most important economic activities are cattle raising, commerce and agriculture. The GDP in 2005 was R$162 million, of which, 89 million came from services. Abaeté is in the top tier of municipalities in the state with regard to economic and social development. In 2007 there were three banking agencies in the town. There was a small retail infrastructure serving the surrounding area of cattle and agricultural lands. In 2007, there were 3,629 automobiles in all of the municipality, about one for every six inhabitants.

In 2007, in the rural area, there were 989 establishments occupying 136,000 hectares. About 2,500 persons were employed in agriculture. 264 of the municipality's farms had tractors, a ratio of one in four farms. There were 87,000 head of cattle in 2006, of which, 16,000 head were dairy cows. In permanent crops, there were 4,400 hectares planted, while in perennial crops, 4,700 hectares were planted. The crops with a planted area of more than 200 hectares were sugarcane and corn.

== Health and education ==
In the health sector, there were 13 health clinics and one hospital with 60 beds. In the educational sector, there were 10 primary schools and two middle schools.

- Municipal Human Development Index: 0.778 (2000)
- State ranking: 125 out of 853 municipalities in 2000
- National ranking: 1,110 out of 5,138 municipalities in 2000
- Literacy rate: 87%
- Life expectancy: 72 (average of males and females)

== See also ==
- List of municipalities in Minas Gerais
