= Intermediate Geographic Region of Petrópolis =

Location

The Intermediate Geographic Region of Petrópolis is one of the five intermediate geographic regions in the Brazilian state of Rio de Janeiro and one of the 134 intermediate regions in Brazil, established by the Brazilian Institute of Geography and Statistics (IBGE) in 2017.

It consists of 19 municipalities, distributed in 3 immediate geographic regions:

- Immediate Geographic Region of Petrópolis
- Immediate Geographic Region of Nova Friburgo
- Immediate Geographic Region of Três Rios-Paraíba do Sul
