= Immediate Geographic Region of Ipatinga =

Urban administrative region in Minas Gerais, Brazil

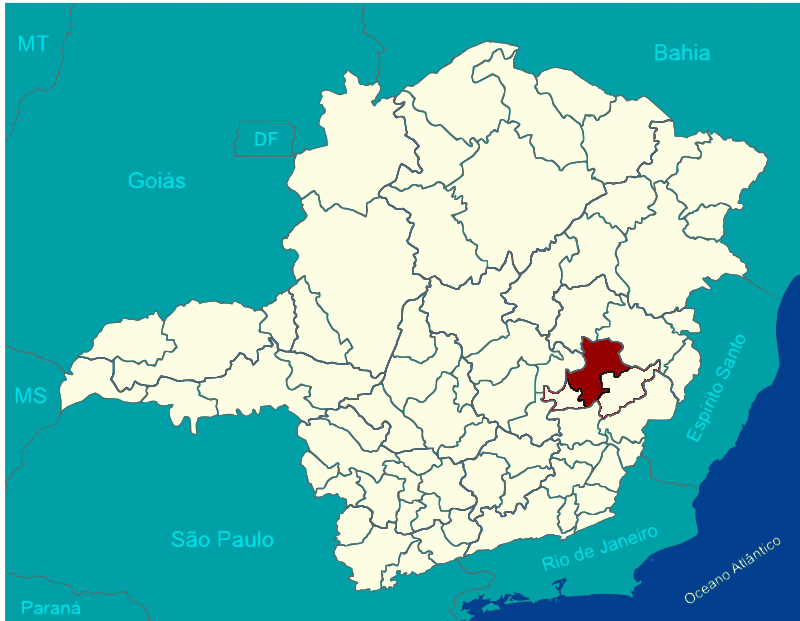
Immediate Geographic Region of Ipatinga, in the state of Minas Gerais, Brazil.

The Immediate Geographic Region of Ipatinga is one of the 3 immediate geographic regions in the Intermediate Geographic Region of Ipatinga, one of the 70 immediate geographic regions in the Brazilian state of Minas Gerais and one of the 509 of Brazil, created by the National Institute of Geography and Statistics (IBGE) in 2017.

== Municipalities ==
It comprises 22 municipalities:

- Açucena
- Antônio Dias
- Belo Oriente
- Braúnas
- Bugre
- Coronel Fabriciano
- Dionísio
- Dom Cavati
- Iapu
- Ipaba
- Ipatinga
- Jaguaraçu
- Joanésia
- Marliéria
- Mesquita
- Naque
- Periquito
- Pingo-d'Água
- Santana do Paraíso
- São João do Oriente
- São José do Goiabal
- Timóteo

== See also ==
- List of Intermediate and Immediate Geographic Regions of Minas Gerais
