= Intermediate Geographic Region of Pouso Alegre =

Interurban administrative region in Minas Gerais, Brazil

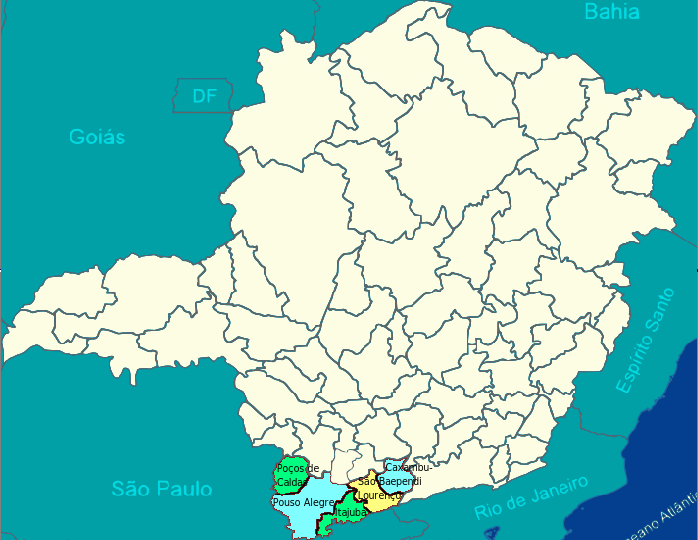
The Intermediate Geographic Region of Pouso Alegre, in the state of Minas Gerais, Brazil.

The Intermediate Geographic Region of Pouso Alegre (code 3109) is one of the 13 intermediate geographic regions in the Brazilian state of Minas Gerais and one of the 134 of Brazil, created by the National Institute of Geography and Statistics (IBGE) in 2017.

It comprises 80 municipalities, distributed in 5 immediate geographic regions:

- Immediate Geographic Region of Pouso Alegre.
- Immediate Geographic Region of Poços de Caldas.
- Immediate Geographic Region of São Lourenço.
- Immediate Geographic Region of Itajubá.
- Immediate Geographic Region of Caxambu-Baependi.

== See also ==
- List of Intermediate and Immediate Geographic Regions of Minas Gerais
