= Immediate Geographic Region of Patos de Minas =

Urban administrative region in Minas Gerais, Brazil

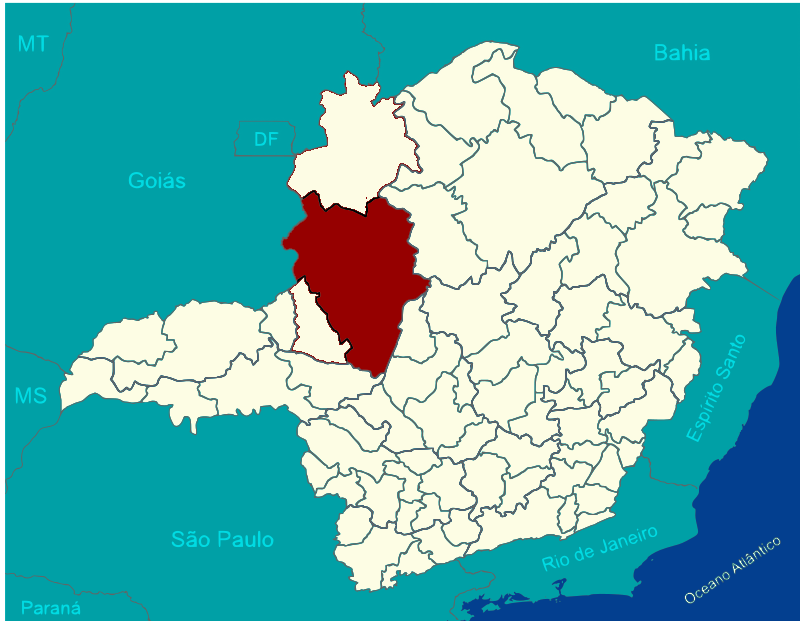
Immediate Geographic Region of Patos de Minas, in the state of Minas Gerais, Brazil.

The Immediate Geographic Region of Patos de Minas is one of the 3 immediate geographic regions in the Intermediate Geographic Region of Patos de Minas, one of the 70 immediate geographic regions in the Brazilian state of Minas Gerais and one of the 509 of Brazil, created by the National Institute of Geography and Statistics (IBGE) in 2017.

== Municipalities ==
It comprises 18 municipalities.

- Arapuá
- Brasilândia de Minas
- Carmo do Paranaíba
- Guarda-Mor
- João Pinheiro
- Lagamar
- Lagoa Formosa
- Lagoa Grande
- Matutina
- Paracatu
- Patos de Minas
- Presidente Olegário
- Rio Paranaíba
- São Gonçalo do Abaeté
- São Gotardo
- Tiros
- Varjão de Minas
- Vazante

== See also ==
- List of Intermediate and Immediate Geographic Regions of Minas Gerais
