= Immediate Geographic Region of Passos =

Urban administrative region in Minas Gerais, Brazil

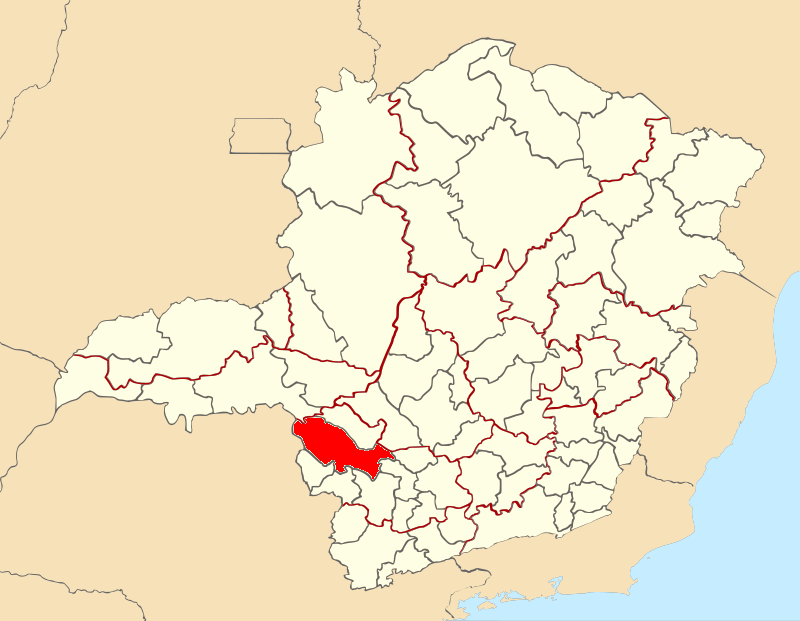
Immediate Geographic Region of Passos, in the state of Minas Gerais, Brazil.

The Immediate Geographic Region of Passos is one of the 10 immediate geographic regions in the Intermediate Geographic Region of Varginha, one of the 70 immediate geographic regions in the Brazilian state of Minas Gerais and one of the 509 of Brazil, created by the National Institute of Geography and Statistics (IBGE) in 2017.

== Municipalities ==
It comprises 15 municipalities.

- Alpinópolis
- Bom Jesus da Penha
- Capetinga
- Carmo do Rio Claro
- Cássia
- Claraval
- Delfinópolis
- Fortaleza de Minas
- Guapé
- Ibiraci
- Itaú de Minas
- Passos
- Pratápolis
- São João Batista do Glória
- São José da Barra

== See also ==
- List of Intermediate and Immediate Geographic Regions of Minas Gerais
