= Immediate Geographic Region of Dores do Indaiá =

Urban administrative region in Minas Gerais, Brazil

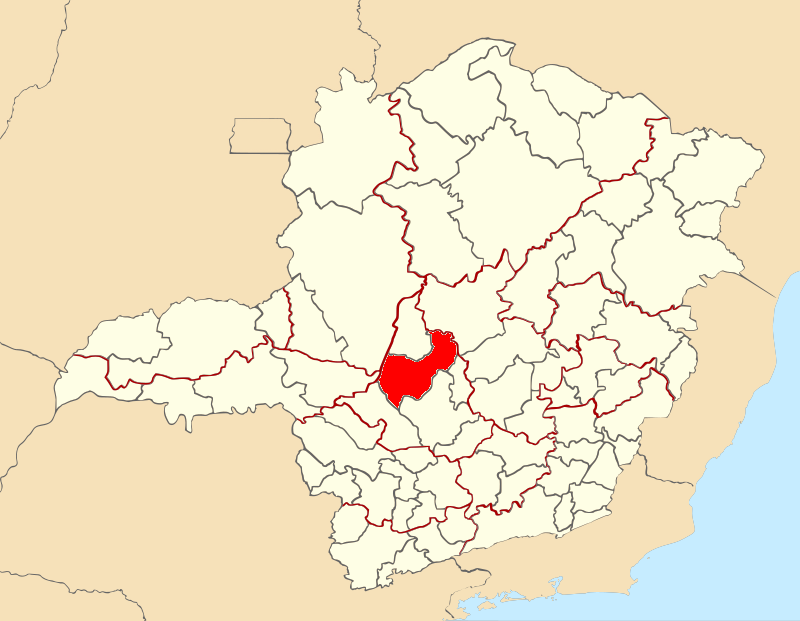
Immediate Geographic Region of Dores do Indaiá, in the state of Minas Gerais, Brazil.

The Immediate Geographic Region of Dores do Indaiá is one of the 6 immediate geographic regions in the Intermediate Geographic Region of Divinópolis, one of the 70 immediate geographic regions in the Brazilian state of Minas Gerais and one of the 509 of Brazil, created by the National Institute of Geography and Statistics (IBGE) in 2017.

== Municipalities ==
It comprises 9 municipalities.

- Bom Despacho
- Dores do Indaiá
- Estrela do Indaiá
- Luz
- Martinho Campos
- Moema
- Pompéu
- Quartel Geral
- Serra da Saudade

== See also ==
- List of Intermediate and Immediate Geographic Regions of Minas Gerais
