= Immediate Geographic Region of Montes Claros =

Urban administrative region in Minas Gerais, Brazil

Immediate Geographic Region of Montes Claros, in the state of Minas Gerais, Brazil.

The Immediate Geographic Region of Montes Claros is one of the 7 immediate geographic regions in the Intermediate Geographic Region of Montes Claros, one of the 70 immediate geographic regions in the Brazilian state of Minas Gerais and one of the 509 of Brazil, created by the National Institute of Geography and Statistics (IBGE) in 2017.

== Municipalities ==
It comprises 32 municipalities.

- Bocaiuva
- Botumirim
- Brasília de Minas
- Campo Azul
- Capitão Enéas
- Claro dos Poções
- Coração de Jesus
- Cristália
- Engenheiro Navarro
- Francisco Dumont
- Francisco Sá
- Glaucilândia
- Grão Mongol
- Guaraciama
- Ibiracatu
- Itacambira
- Japonvar
- Jequitaí
- Joaquim Felício
- Josenópolis
- Juramento
- Lagoa dos Patos
- Lontra
- Luislândia
- Mirabela
- Montes Claros
- Olhos-d'Água
- Patis
- São João da Lagoa
- São João da Ponte
- São João do Pacuí
- Varzelândia

== See also ==
- List of Intermediate and Immediate Geographic Regions of Minas Gerais
