= Immediate Geographic Region of Divinópolis =

Urban administrative region in Minas Gerais, Brazil

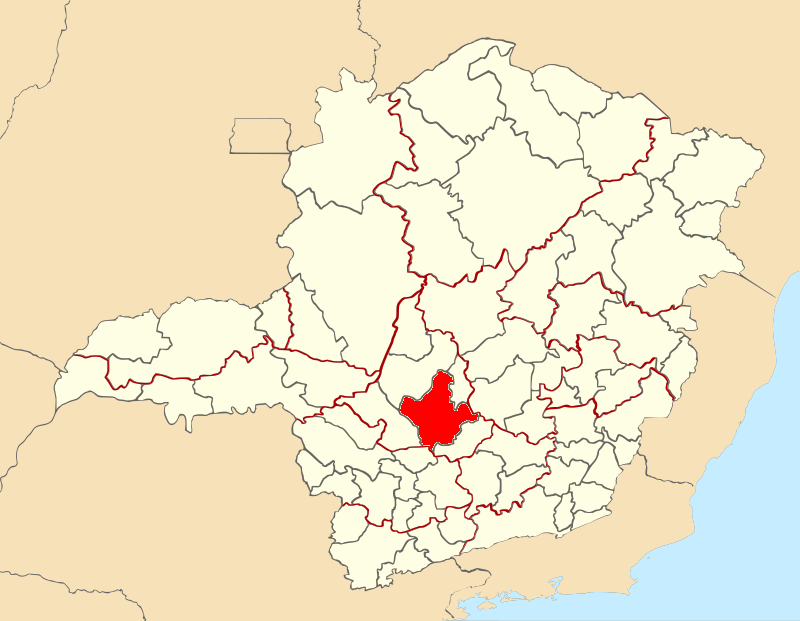
Immediate Geographic Region of Divinópolis, in the state of Minas Gerais, Brazil.

The Immediate Geographic Region of Divinópolis is one of the 6 immediate geographic regions in the Intermediate Geographic Region of Divinópolis, one of the 70 immediate geographic regions in the Brazilian state of Minas Gerais and one of the 509 of Brazil, created by the National Institute of Geography and Statistics (IBGE) in 2017.

== Municipalities ==
It comprises 20 municipalities.

- Araújos
- Camacho
- Carmo da Mata
- Carmo do Cajuru
- Cláudio
- Conceição do Pará
- Divinópolis
- Itapecerica
- Itatiaiuçu
- Itaúna
- Japaraíba
- Lagoa da Prata
- Leandro Ferreira
- Nova Serrana
- Pedra do Indaiá
- Perdigão
- Pitangui
- Santo Antônio do Monte
- São Gonçalo do Pará
- São Sebastião do Oeste

== See also ==
- List of Intermediate and Immediate Geographic Regions of Minas Gerais
