= Intermediate Geographic Region of Montes Claros =

Interurban administrative region in Minas Gerais, Brazil

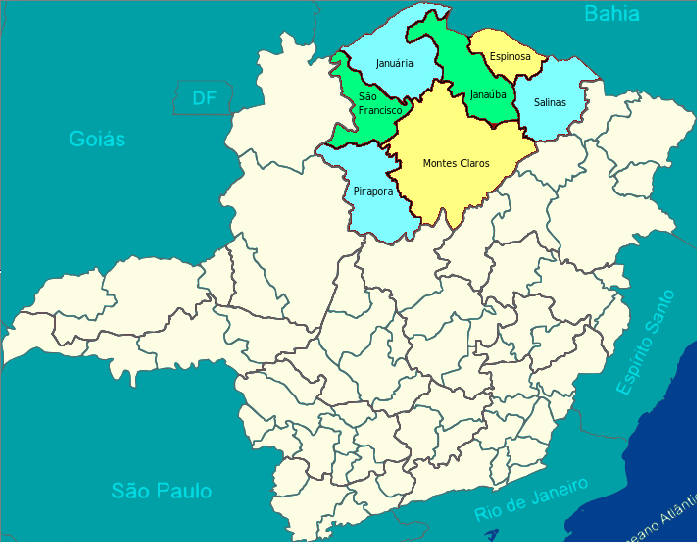
The Intermediate Geographic Region of Montes Claros, in the state of Minas Gerais, Brazil.

The Intermediate Geographic Region of Montes Claros (code 3102) is one of the 13 intermediate geographic regions in the Brazilian state of Minas Gerais and one of the 134 of Brazil, created by the National Institute of Geography and Statistics (IBGE) in 2017.

It comprises 87 municipalities, distributed in 7 immediate geographic regions:

- Immediate Geographic Region of Montes Claros.
- Immediate Geographic Region of Janaúba.
- Immediate Geographic Region of Salinas.
- Immediate Geographic Region of Januária.
- Immediate Geographic Region of Pirapora.
- Immediate Geographic Region of São Francisco.
- Immediate Geographic Region of Espinosa.

== See also ==
- List of Intermediate and Immediate Geographic Regions of Minas Gerais
