= Immediate Geographic Region of São Lourenço =

Urban administrative region in Minas Gerais, Brazil

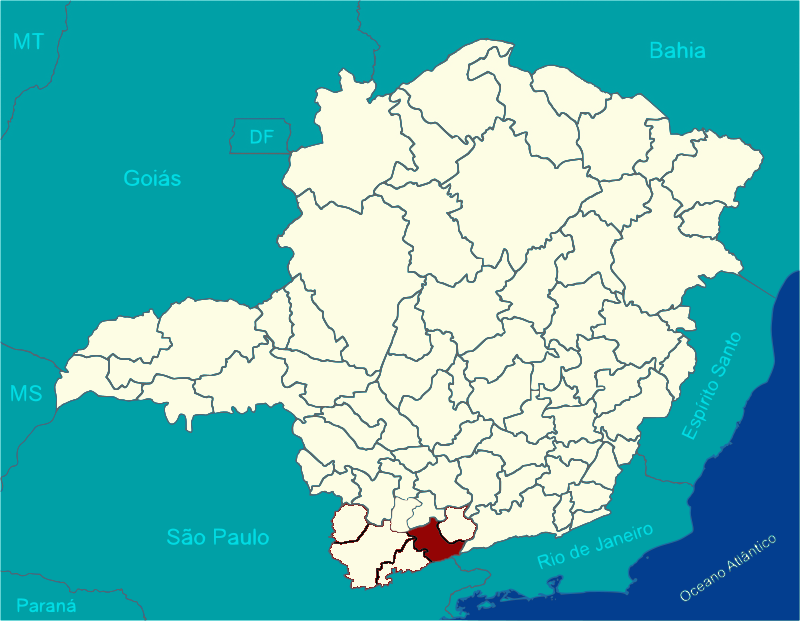
Immediate Geographic Region of São Lourenço, in the state of Minas Gerais, Brazil.

The Immediate Geographic Region of São Lourenço is one of the 10 immediate geographic regions in the Intermediate Geographic Region of Pouso Alegre, one of the 70 immediate geographic regions in the Brazilian state of Minas Gerais and one of the 509 of Brazil, created by the National Institute of Geography and Statistics (IBGE) in 2017.

== Municipalities ==
It comprises 16 municipalities.

- Alagoa
- Carmo de Minas
- Conceição do Rio Verde
- Cristina
- Dom Viçoso
- Itamonte
- Itanhandu
- Jesuânia
- Lambari
- Olímpio Noronha
- Passa Quatro
- Pouso Alto
- São Lourenço
- São Sebastião do Rio Verde
- Soledade de Minas
- Virgínia

== See also ==
- List of Intermediate and Immediate Geographic Regions of Minas Gerais
