= Intermediate Geographic Region of Varginha =

Interurban administrative region in Minas Gerais, Brazil

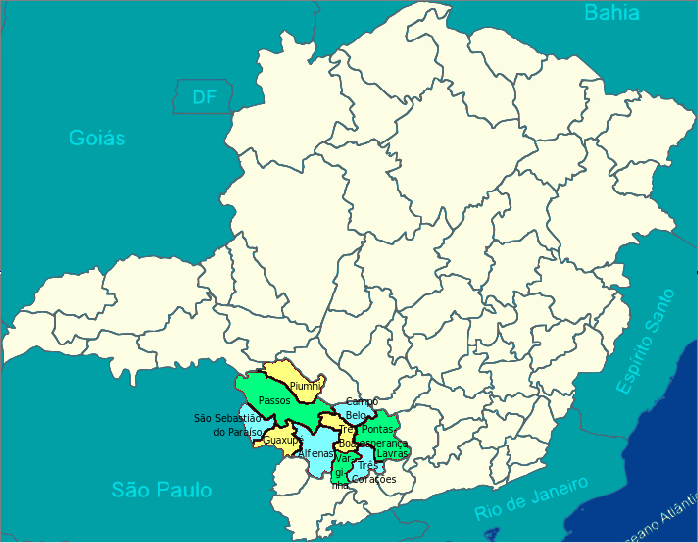
The Intermediate Geographic Region of Varginha, in the state of Minas Gerais, Brazil.

The Intermediate Geographic Region of Varginha (code 3108) is one of the 13 intermediate geographic regions in the Brazilian state of Minas Gerais and one of the 134 of Brazil, created by the National Institute of Geography and Statistics (IBGE) in 2017.

It comprises 82 municipalities, distributed in 10 immediate geographic regions:

- Immediate Geographic Region of Varginha.
- Immediate Geographic Region of Passos.
- Immediate Geographic Region of Alfenas.
- Immediate Geographic Region of Lavras.
- Immediate Geographic Region of Piumhi.
- Immediate Geographic Region of Campo Belo.
- Immediate Geographic Region of Guaxupé.
- Immediate Geographic Region of Três Corações.
- Immediate Geographic Region of São Sebastião do Paraíso.
- Immediate Geographic Region of Três Pontas-Boa Esperança.

== See also ==
- List of Intermediate and Immediate Geographic Regions of Minas Gerais
