= Immediate Geographic Region of São Sebastião do Paraíso =

Urban administrative region in Minas Gerais, Brazil

Immediate Geographic Region of São Sebastião do Paraíso, in the state of Minas Gerais, Brazil.

The Immediate Geographic Region of São Sebastião do Paraíso is one of the 10 immediate geographic regions in the Intermediate Geographic Region of Varginha, one of the 70 immediate geographic regions in the Brazilian state of Minas Gerais and one of the 509 of Brazil, created by the National Institute of Geography and Statistics (IBGE) in 2017.

== Municipalities ==
It comprises 5 municipalities.

- Jacuí
- Itamogi
- Monte Santo de Minas
- São Tomás de Aquino
- São Sebastião do Paraíso

== See also ==
- List of Intermediate and Immediate Geographic Regions of Minas Gerais
