= Immediate Geographic Region of Formiga =

Urban administrative region in Minas Gerais, Brazil

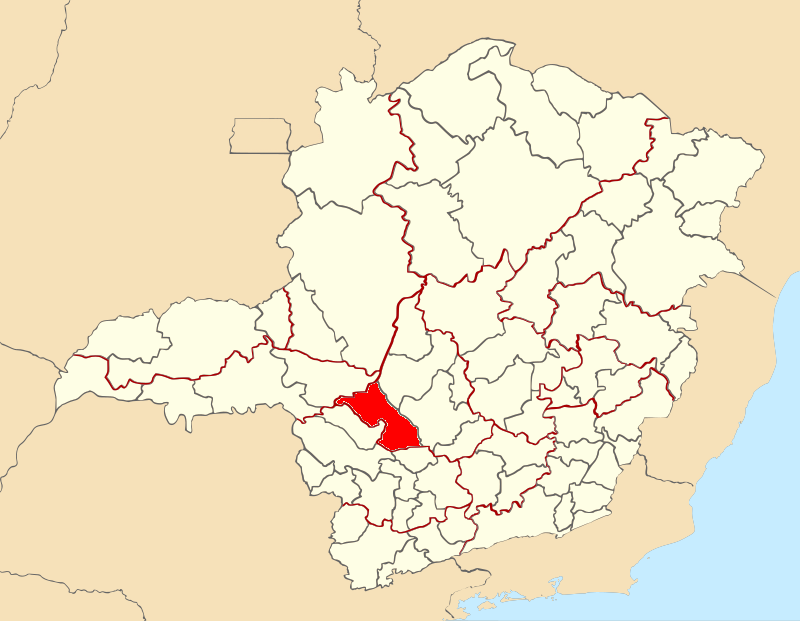
Immediate Geographic Region of Formiga, in the state of Minas Gerais, Brazil.

The Immediate Geographic Region of Formiga is one of the 6 immediate geographic regions in the Intermediate Geographic Region of Divinópolis, one of the 70 immediate geographic regions in the Brazilian state of Minas Gerais and one of the 509 of Brazil, created by the National Institute of Geography and Statistics (IBGE) in 2017.

== Municipalities ==
It comprises 10 municipalities.

- Arcos
- Bambuí
- Córrego Danta
- Córrego Fundo
- Formiga
- Iguatama
- Medeiros
- Pains
- Pimenta
- Tapiraí

== See also ==
- List of Intermediate and Immediate Geographic Regions of Minas Gerais
