= Intermediate Geographic Region of Patos de Minas =

Interurban administrative region in Minas Gerais, Brazil

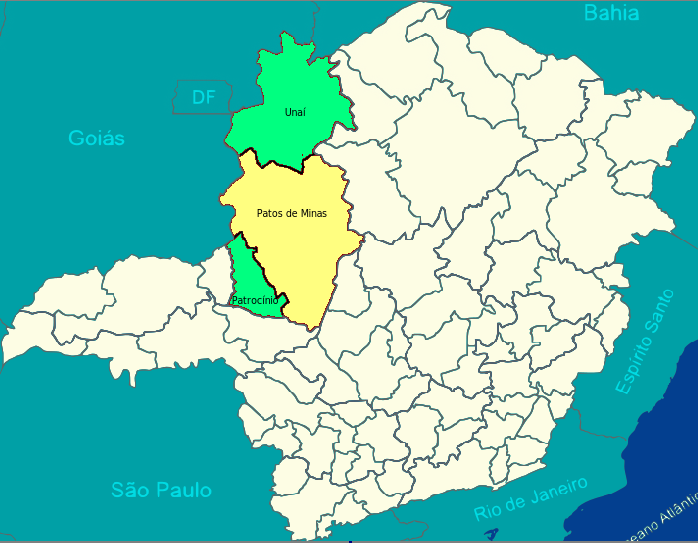
The Intermediate Geographic Region of Patos de Minas, in the state of Minas Gerais, Brazil.

The Intermediate Geographic Region of Patos de Minas (code 3112) is one of the 13 intermediate geographic regions in the Brazilian state of Minas Gerais and one of the 134 of Brazil, created by the National Institute of Geography and Statistics (IBGE) in 2017.

It comprises 34 municipalities, distributed in 3 immediate geographic regions:

- Immediate Geographic Region of Patos de Minas.
- Immediate Geographic Region of Unaí.
- Immediate Geographic Region of Patrocínio.

== See also ==
- List of Intermediate and Immediate Geographic Regions of Minas Gerais
