= Immediate Geographic Region of Oliveira =

Urban administrative region in Minas Gerais, Brazil

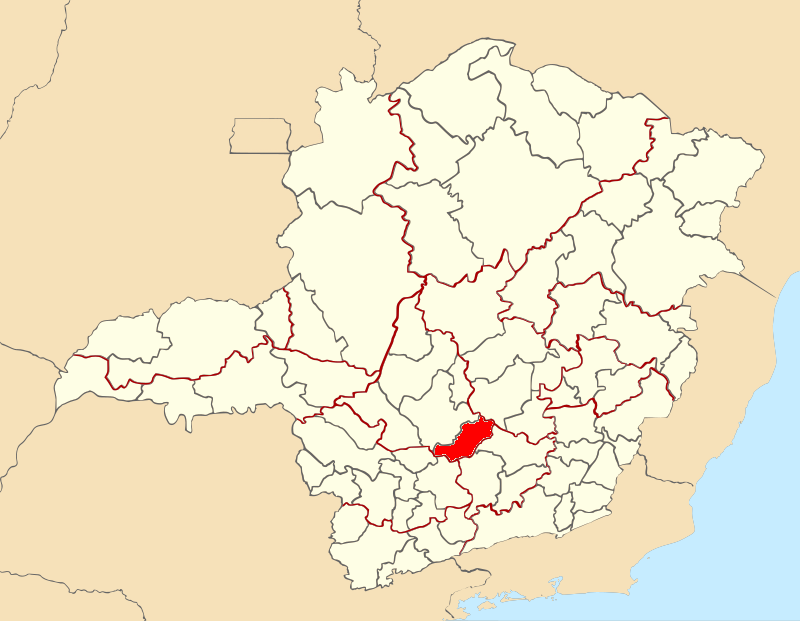
Immediate Geographic Region of Oliveira, in the state of Minas Gerais, Brazil.

The Immediate Geographic Region of Oliveira is one of the 6 immediate geographic regions in the Intermediate Geographic Region of Divinópolis, one of the 70 immediate geographic regions in the Brazilian state of Minas Gerais and one of the 509 of Brazil, created by the National Institute of Geography and Statistics (IBGE) in 2017.

== Municipalities ==
It comprises 10 municipalities.

- Bonfim
- Carmópolis de Minas
- Crucilândia
- Itaguara
- Oliveira
- Passa Tempo
- Piedade dos Gerais
- Piracema
- Rio Manso
- São Francisco de Paula

== See also ==
- List of Intermediate and Immediate Geographic Regions of Minas Gerais
