= Immediate Geographic Region of Alfenas =

Urban administrative region in Minas Gerais, Brazil

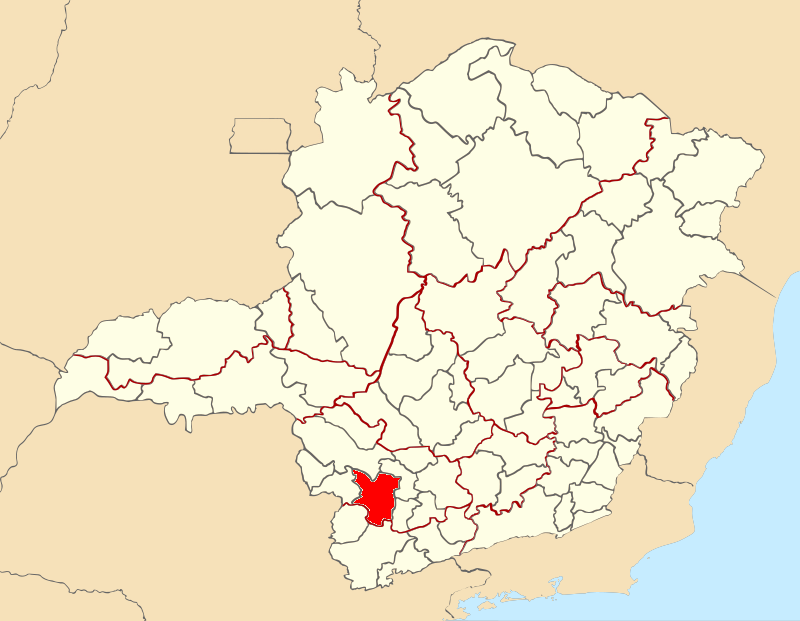
Immediate Geographic Region of Alfenas, in the state of Minas Gerais, Brazil.

The Immediate Geographic Region of Alfenas is one of the 10 immediate geographic regions in the Intermediate Geographic Region of Varginha, one of the 70 immediate geographic regions in the Brazilian state of Minas Gerais and one of the 509 of Brazil, created by the National Institute of Geography and Statistics (IBGE) in 2017.

== Municipalities ==
It comprises 13 municipalities.

- Alfenas
- Alterosa
- Areado
- Campo do Meio
- Campos Gerais
- Carvalhópolis
- Conceição da Aparecida
- Divisa Nova
- Fama
- Machado
- Paraguaçu
- Poço Fundo
- Serrania

== See also ==
- List of Intermediate and Immediate Geographic Regions of Minas Gerais
