= Immediate Geographic Region of Pedra Azul =

Urban administrative region in Minas Gerais, Brazil

Immediate Geographic Region of Pedra Azul, in the state of Minas Gerais, Brazil.

The Immediate Geographic Region of Pedra Azul is one of the 7 immediate geographic regions in the Intermediate Geographic Region of Teófilo Otoni, one of the 70 immediate geographic regions in the Brazilian state of Minas Gerais and one of the 509 of Brazil, created by the National Institute of Geography and Statistics (IBGE) in 2017.

== Municipalities ==
It comprises 7 municipalities.

- Águas Vermelhas
- Cachoeira de Pajeú
- Comercinho
- Divisa Alegre
- Divisópolis
- Medina
- Pedra Azul

== See also ==
- List of Intermediate and Immediate Geographic Regions of Minas Gerais
