= Immediate Geographic Region of Poços de Caldas =

Urban administrative region in Minas Gerais, Brazil

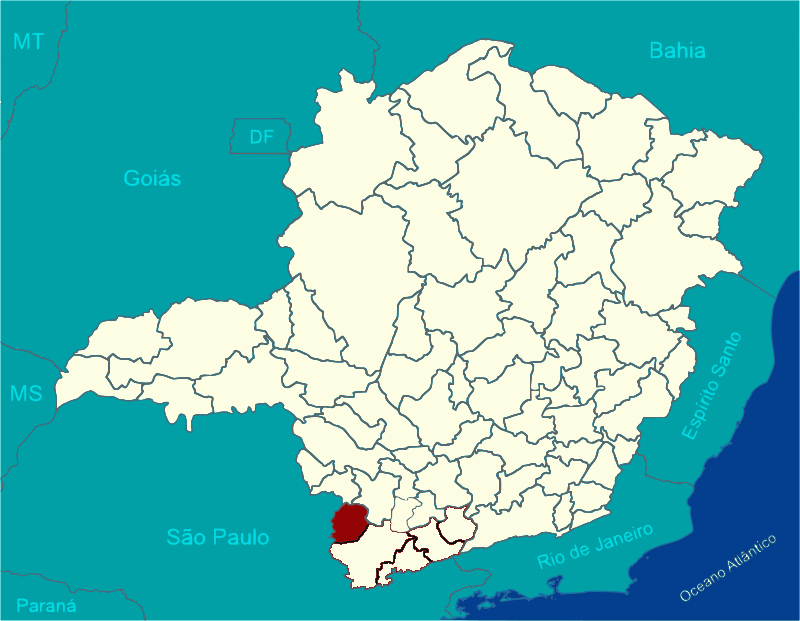
Immediate Geographic Region of Poços de Caldas, in the state of Minas Gerais, Brazil.

The Immediate Geographic Region of Poços de Caldas is one of the 10 immediate geographic regions in the Intermediate Geographic Region of Pouso Alegre, one of the 70 immediate geographic regions in the Brazilian state of Minas Gerais and one of the 509 of Brazil, created by the National Institute of Geography and Statistics (IBGE) in 2017.

== Municipalities ==
It comprises 8 municipalities.

- Andradas
- Bandeira do Sul
- Botelhos
- Caldas
- Campestre
- Ibitiúra de Minas
- Poços de Caldas
- Santa Rita de Caldas

== See also ==
- List of Intermediate and Immediate Geographic Regions of Minas Gerais
