= Immediate Geographic Region of Governador Valadares =

Urban administrative region in Minas Gerais, Brazil

Immediate Geographic Region of Governador Valadares, in the state of Minas Gerais, Brazil.

The Immediate Geographic Region of Governador Valadares is one of the 4 immediate geographic regions in the Intermediate Geographic Region of Governador Valadares, one of the 70 immediate geographic regions in the Brazilian state of Minas Gerais and one of the 509 of Brazil, created by the National Institute of Geography and Statistics (IBGE) in 2017.

== Municipalities ==
It comprises 26 municipalities.

- Alpercata
- Capitão Andrade
- Conselheiro Pena
- Coroaci
- Café-Mirim
- Divino das Laranjeiras
- Engenheiro Caldas
- Fernandes Tourinho
- Frei Inocêncio
- Galileia
- Goiabeira
- Gonzaga
- Governador Valadares
- Itanhomi
- Jampruca
- Marilac
- Mathias Lobato
- Nacip Raydan
- Santa Efigênia de Minas
- São Geraldo da Piedade
- São Geraldo do Baixio
- São José da Safira
- Sardoá
- Sobrália
- Tarumirim
- Tumiritinga
- Virgolândia

== See also ==
- List of Intermediate and Immediate Geographic Regions of Minas Gerais
