= Immediate Geographic Region of Pará de Minas =

Urban administrative region in Minas Gerais, Brazil

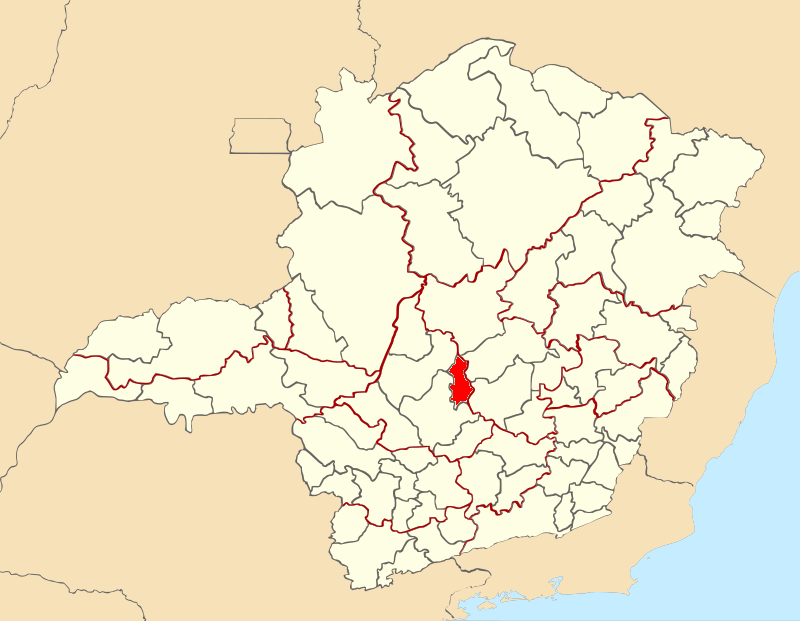
Immediate Geographic Region of Pará de Minas, in the state of Minas Gerais, Brazil.

The Immediate Geographic Region of Pará de Minas is one of the 6 immediate geographic regions in the Intermediate Geographic Region of Divinópolis, one of the 70 immediate geographic regions in the Brazilian state of Minas Gerais and one of the 509 of Brazil, created by the National Institute of Geography and Statistics (IBGE) in 2017.

== Municipalities ==
It comprises 7 municipalities.

- Igaratinga
- Maravilhas
- Onça de Pitangui
- Papagaios
- Pará de Minas
- Pequi
- São José da Varginha

== See also ==
- List of Intermediate and Immediate Geographic Regions of Minas Gerais
