= Immediate Geographic Region of Três Corações =

Urban administrative region in Minas Gerais, Brazil

Immediate Geographic Region of Três Corações Região Geográfica Imediata de Três Corações
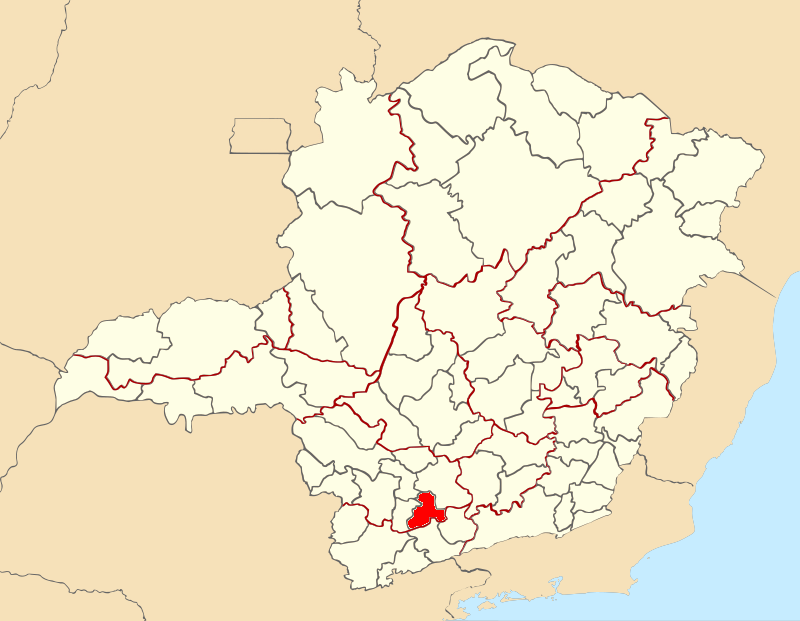
- Immediate Geographic Region of Três Corações, in the state of Minas Gerais, Brazil.
- Established: 2017
- Time zone: UTC-3 (Brasília Time, BRT)

The Immediate Geographic Region of Três Corações (Portuguese: Região Geográfica Imediata de Três Coraçõesis) is one of the 10 immediate geographic regions in the Intermediate Geographic Region of Varginha, one of the 70 immediate geographic regions in the Brazilian state of Minas Gerais and one of the 509 of Brazil, created by the National Institute of Geography and Statistics (IBGE) in 2017.

== Municipalities ==
It comprises 6 municipalities.

- Cambuquira
- Campanha
- Carmo da Cachoeira
- São Bento Abade
- São Tomé das Letras
- Três Corações

== See also ==
- List of Intermediate and Immediate Geographic Regions of Minas Gerais
