= Immediate Geographic Region of Pouso Alegre =

Urban administrative region in Minas Gerais, Brazil

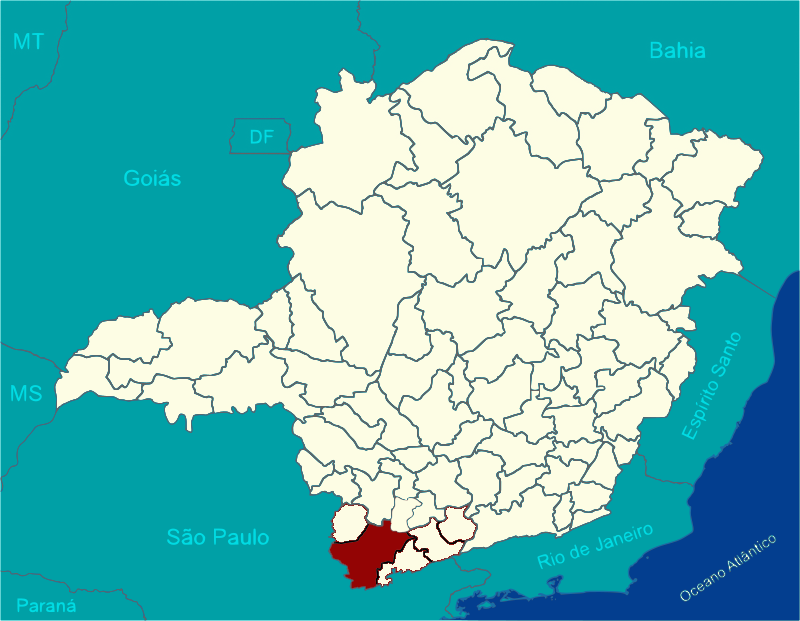
Immediate Geographic Region of Pouso Alegre, in the state of Minas Gerais, Brazil.

The Immediate Geographic Region of Pouso Alegre is one of the 10 immediate geographic regions in the Intermediate Geographic Region of Pouso Alegre, one of the 70 immediate geographic regions in the Brazilian state of Minas Gerais and one of the 509 of Brazil, created by the National Institute of Geography and Statistics (IBGE) in 2017.

== Municipalities ==
It comprises 34 municipalities.

- Albertina
- Bom Repouso
- Borda da Mata
- Bueno Brandão
- Cachoeira de Minas
- Camanducaia
- Cambuí
- Careaçu
- Conceição dos Ouros
- Congonhal
- Consolação
- Córrego do Bom Jesus
- Espírito Santo do Dourado
- Estiva
- Extrema
- Heliodora
- Inconfidentes
- Ipuiuna
- Itapeva
- Jacutinga
- Monte Sião
- Munhoz
- Natércia
- Ouro Fino
- Pouso Alegre
- Santa Rita do Sapucaí
- São João da Mata
- São Sebastião da Bela Vista
- Senador Amaral
- Senador José Bento
- Silvianópolis
- Tocos do Moji
- Toledo
- Turvolândia

== See also ==
- List of Intermediate and Immediate Geographic Regions of Minas Gerais
