= Intermediate Geographic Region of Ipatinga =

Interurban administrative region in Minas Gerais, Brazil

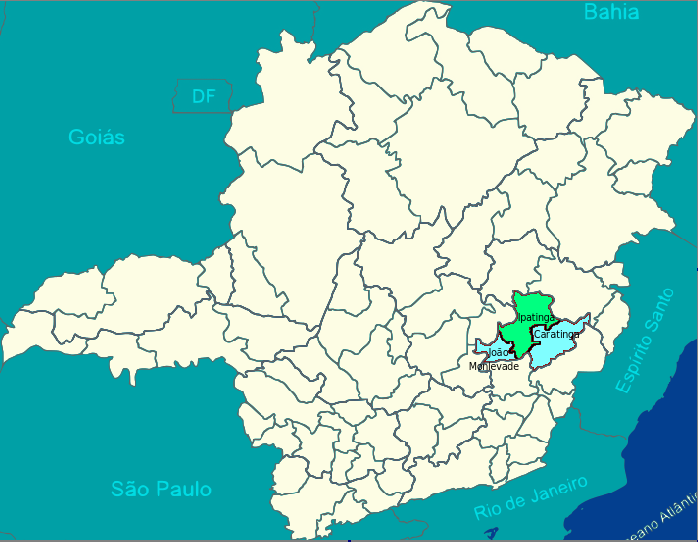
The Intermediate Geographic Region of Ipatinga, in the state of Minas Gerais, Brazil.

The Intermediate Geographic Region of Ipatinga (code 3105) is one of the 13 intermediate geographic regions in the Brazilian state of Minas Gerais and one of the 134 of Brazil, created by the National Institute of Geography and Statistics (IBGE) in 2017.

It comprises 44 municipalities, distributed in 3 immediate geographic regions:

- Immediate Geographic Region of Ipatinga.
- Immediate Geographic Region of Caratinga.
- Immediate Geographic Region of João Monlevade.

== See also ==
- List of Intermediate and Immediate Geographic Regions of Minas Gerais
