= Immediate Geographic Region of Itajubá =

Urban administrative region in Minas Gerais, Brazil

Immediate Geographic Region of Itajubá, in the state of Minas Gerais, Brazil.

The Immediate Geographic Region of Itajubá is one of the 10 immediate geographic regions in the Intermediate Geographic Region of Pouso Alegre, one of the 70 immediate geographic regions in the Brazilian state of Minas Gerais and one of the 509 of Brazil, created by the National Institute of Geography and Statistics (IBGE) in 2017.

== Municipalities ==
It comprises 14 municipalities.

- Brazópolis
- Conceição das Pedras
- Delfim Moreira
- Gonçalves
- Itajubá
- Maria da Fé
- Marmelópolis
- Paraisópolis
- Pedralva
- Piranguçu
- Piranguinho
- São José do Alegre
- Sapucaí-Mirim
- Wenceslau Braz

== See also ==
- List of Intermediate and Immediate Geographic Regions of Minas Gerais
