= Bugre =

Coordinates: 19°24′25″S 42°15′54″W

- Municipality
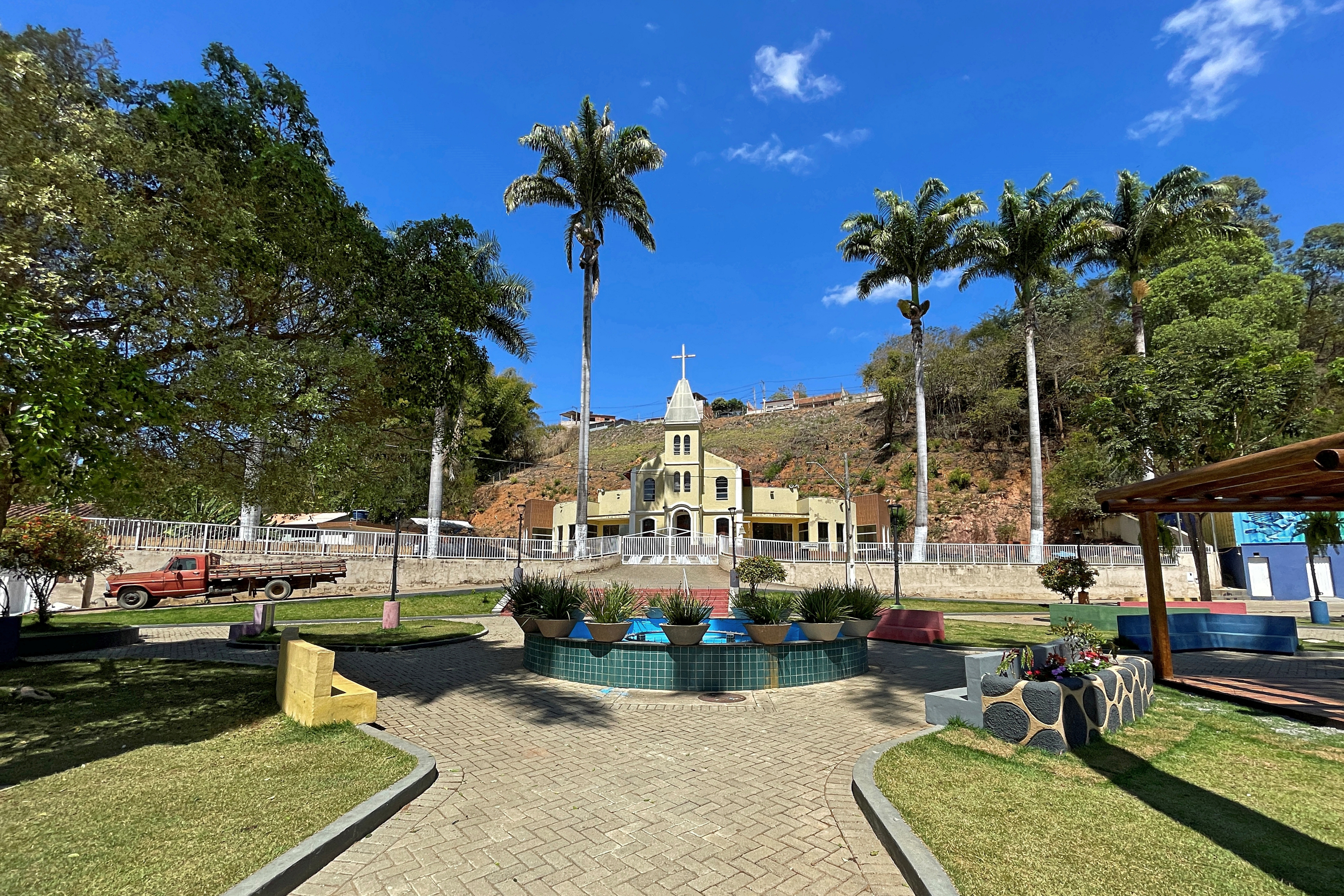
- Padre Francisco Weber Square with the Saint Sebastian Matriz Church in the background

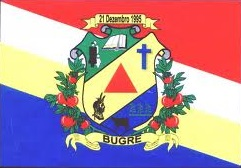
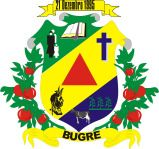
- Flag Coat of arms
- Interactive map of Bugre
- Country: Brazil
- Region: Southeast
- State: Minas Gerais
- Mesoregion: Vale do Rio Doce

Population (2022 Census)
  - Total: 4,041
  - Estimate (2025): 4,159
- Time zone: UTC−3 (BRT)

Bugre is a municipality in the state of Minas Gerais in the Southeast region of Brazil.

== See also ==
- List of municipalities in Minas Gerais
