= Immediate Geographic Region of Santa Bárbara-Ouro Preto =

Urban administrative region in Minas Gerais, Brazil

The Immediate Geographic Region of Santa Bárbara-Ouro Preto is one of the 10 immediate geographic regions in the Intermediate Geographic Region of Belo Horizonte, one of the 70 immediate geographic regions in the Brazilian state of Minas Gerais and one of the 509 of Brazil, created by the National Institute of Geography and Statistics (IBGE) in 2017.

The Immediate Geographic Region of Santa Bárbara-Ouro Preto, in the state of Minas Gerais, Brazil.

It comprises 6 municipalities:

- Barão de Cocais
- Catas Altas
- Itabirito
- Mariana
- Ouro Preto
- Santa Bárbara
