= Immediate Geographic Region of Pirapora =

Urban administrative region in Minas Gerais, Brazil

Immediate Geographic Region of Pirapora, in the state of Minas Gerais, Brazil.

The Immediate Geographic Region of Pirapora is one of the 7 immediate geographic regions in the Intermediate Geographic Region of Montes Claros, one of the 70 immediate geographic regions in the Brazilian state of Minas Gerais and one of the 509 of Brazil, created by the National Institute of Geography and Statistics (IBGE) in 2017.

== Municipalities ==
It comprises 7 municipalities.

- Buritizeiro
- Ibiaí
- Lassance
- Pirapora
- Ponto Chique
- Santa Fé de Minas
- Várzea da Palma
