= Intermediate Geographic Region of Juiz de Fora =

Interurban administrative region in Minas Gerais, Brazil

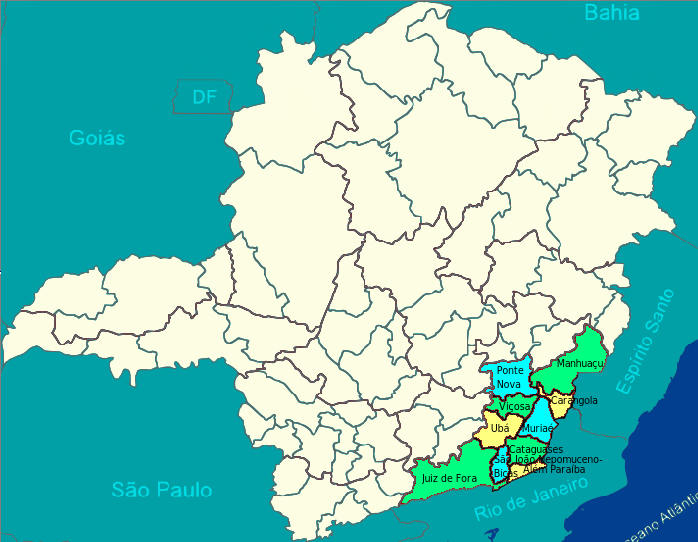
Intermediate Geographic Region of Juiz de Fora, in the state of Minas Gerais, Brazil.

The Intermediate Geographic Region of Juiz de Fora (code 3106) is one of the 13 intermediate geographic regions in the Brazilian state of Minas Gerais and one of the 134 of Brazil, created by the National Institute of Geography and Statistics (IBGE) in 2017.

It comprises 146 municipalities, distributed in 10 immediate geographic regions:

- Immediate Geographic Region of Juiz de Fora.
- Immediate Geographic Region of Manhuaçu.
- Immediate Geographic Region of Ubá.
- Immediate Geographic Region of Muriaé.
- Immediate Geographic Region of Cataguases.
- Immediate Geographic Region of Ponte Nova.
- Immediate Geographic Region of Viçosa.
- Immediate Geographic Region of Carangola.
- Immediate Geographic Region of São João Nepomuceno-Bicas.
- Immediate Geographic Region of Além Paraíba.

== See also ==
- List of Intermediate and Immediate Geographic Regions of Minas Gerais
