= Ilicínea =

Coordinates: 20°56′S 45°50′W

- Municipality
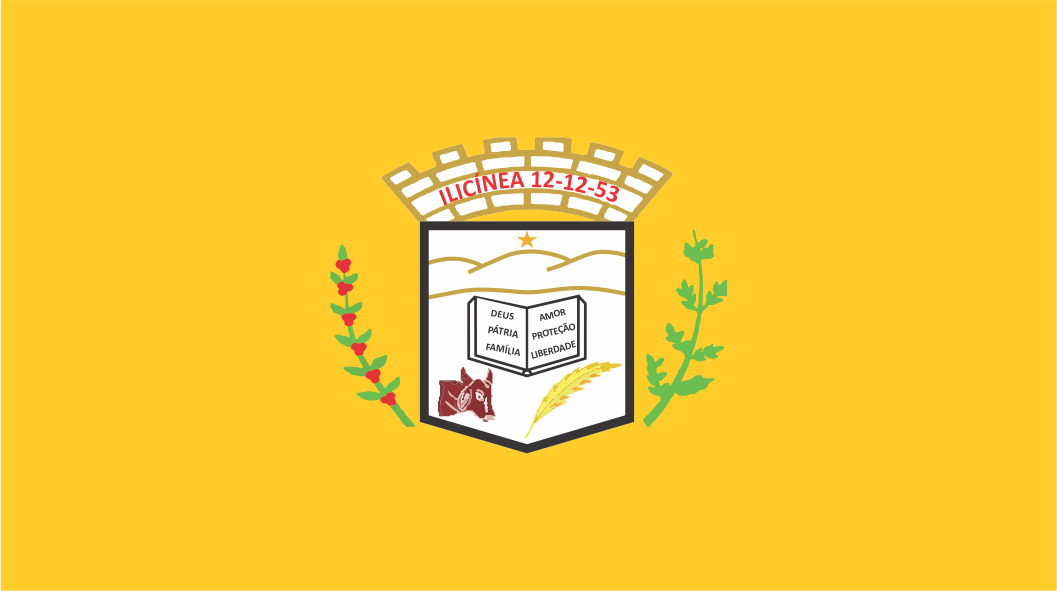
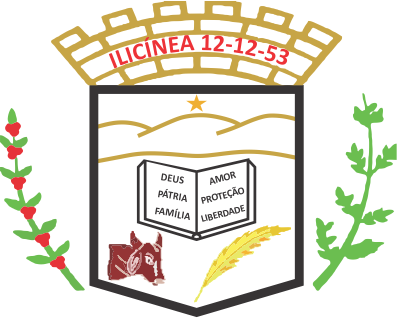
- Flag Coat of arms
- Interactive map of Ilicínea
- Country: Brazil
- Region: Southeast
- State: Minas Gerais
- Mesoregion: Sul/Sudoeste de Minas

Population (2020)
  - Total: 12,444
- Time zone: UTC−3 (BRT)

Ilicínea is a municipality in the state of Minas Gerais in the Southeast region of Brazil.

== See also ==
- List of municipalities in Minas Gerais
