= Intermediate Geographic Region of Divinópolis =

Interurban administrative region in Minas Gerais, Brazil

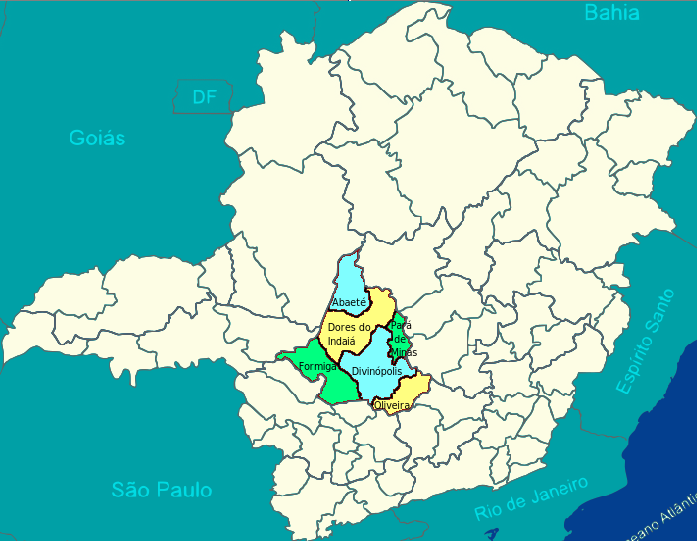
The Intermediate Geographic Region of Divinópolis, in the state of Minas Gerais, Brazil.

The Intermediate Geographic Region of Divinópolis (code 3113) is one of the 13 intermediate geographic regions in the Brazilian state of Minas Gerais and one of the 134 of Brazil, created by the National Institute of Geography and Statistics (IBGE) in 2017.

It comprises 61 municipalities, distributed in 6 immediate geographic regions:

- Immediate Geographic Region of Divinópolis.
- Immediate Geographic Region of Formiga.
- Immediate Geographic Region of Dores do Indaiá.
- Immediate Geographic Region of Pará de Minas.
- Immediate Geographic Region of Oliveira.
- Immediate Geographic Region of Abaeté.

== See also ==
- List of Intermediate and Immediate Geographic Regions of Minas Gerais
