= Immediate Geographic Region of João Monlevade =

Urban administrative region in Minas Gerais, Brazil

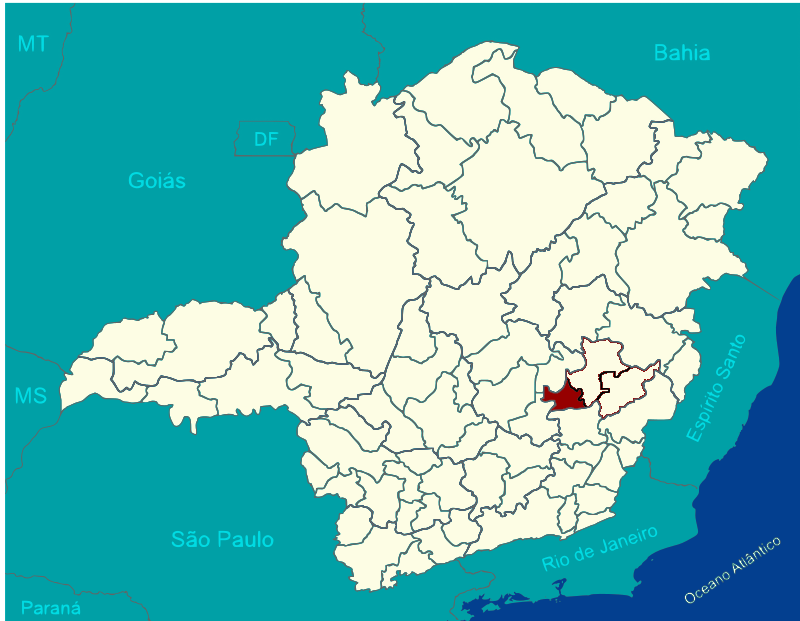
Immediate Geographic Region of João Monlevade, in the state of Minas Gerais, Brazil.

The Immediate Geographic Region of João Monlevade is one of the 3 immediate geographic regions in the Intermediate Geographic Region of Ipatinga, one of the 70 immediate geographic regions in the Brazilian state of Minas Gerais and one of the 509 of Brazil, created by the National Institute of Geography and Statistics (IBGE) in 2017.

== Municipalities ==
It comprises 6 municipalities:

- Bela Vista de Minas
- João Monlevade
- Nova Era
- Rio Piracicaba
- São Domingos do Prata
- São Gonçalo do Rio Abaixo
