= Immediate Geographic Region of Janaúba =

Urban administrative region in Minas Gerais, Brazil

Immediate Geographic Region of Janaúba, in the state of Minas Gerais, Brazil.

The Immediate Geographic Region of Janaúba is one of the 7 immediate geographic regions in the Intermediate Geographic Region of Montes Claros, one of the 70 immediate geographic regions in the Brazilian state of Minas Gerais and one of the 509 of Brazil, created by the National Institute of Geography and Statistics (IBGE) in 2017.

== Municipalities ==
It comprises 11 municipalities.

- Jaíba
- Janaúba
- Manga
- Matias Cardoso
- Miravânia
- Nova Porteirinha
- Pai Pedro
- Porteirinha
- Riacho dos Machados
- Serranópolis de Minas
- Verdelândia
