= Immediate Geographic Region of São João Nepomuceno-Bicas =

Urban administrative region in Minas Gerais, Brazil

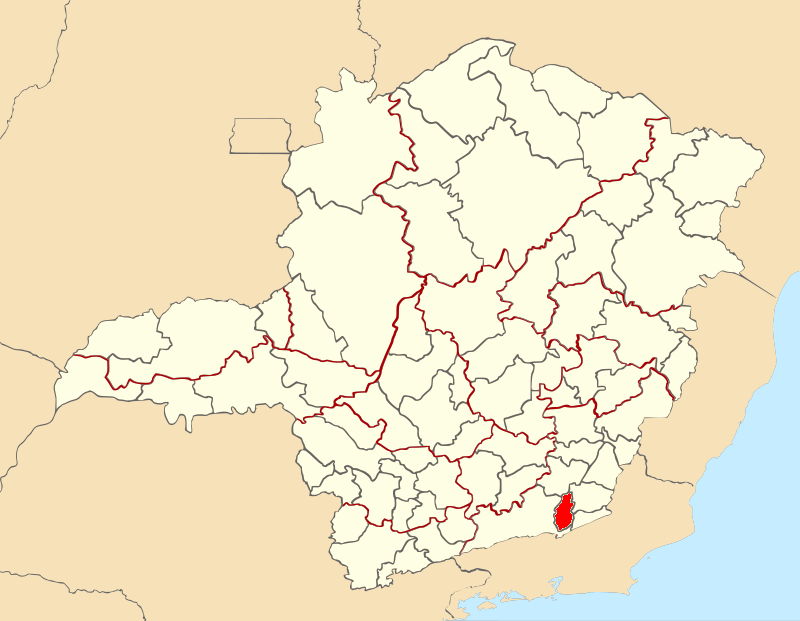
Immediate Geographic Region of São João Nepomuceno-Bicas, in the state of Minas Gerais, Brazil.

The Immediate Geographic Region of São João Nepomuceno-Bicas is one of the 10 immediate geographic regions in the Intermediate Geographic Region of Juiz de Fora, one of the 70 immediate geographic regions in the Brazilian state of Minas Gerais and one of the 509 of Brazil, created by the National Institute of Geography and Statistics (IBGE) in 2017.

== Municipalities ==
It comprises 9 municipalities.

- Bicas
- Descoberto
- Guarará
- Mar de Espanha
- Maripá de Minas
- Pequeri
- Rochedo de Minas
- São João Nepomuceno
- Senador Cortes
