= Immediate Geographic Region of Januária =

Urban administrative region in Minas Gerais, Brazil

Immediate Geographic Region of Januária, in the state of Minas Gerais, Brazil.

The Immediate Geographic Region of Januária is one of the 7 immediate geographic regions in the Intermediate Geographic Region of Montes Claros, one of the 70 immediate geographic regions in the Brazilian state of Minas Gerais and one of the 509 of Brazil, created by the National Institute of Geography and Statistics (IBGE) in 2017.

== Municipalities ==
It comprises 8 municipalities.

- Bonito de Minas
- Cônego Marinho
- Itacarambi
- Januária
- Juvenília
- Montalvânia
- Pedras de Maria da Cruz
- São João das Missões
