= Immediate Geographic Region of Salinas =

Urban administrative region in Minas Gerais, Brazil

Immediate Geographic Region of Salinas, in the state of Minas Gerais, Brazil.

The Immediate Geographic Region of Salinas is one of the 7 immediate geographic regions in the Intermediate Geographic Region of Montes Claros, one of the 70 immediate geographic regions in the Brazilian state of Minas Gerais and one of the 509 of Brazil, created by the National Institute of Geography and Statistics (IBGE) in 2017.

== Municipalities ==
It comprises 14 municipalities.

- Berizal
- Curral de Dentro
- Fruta de Leite
- Indaiabira
- Ninheira
- Novorizonte
- Padre Carvalho
- Rio Pardo de Minas
- Rubelita
- Salinas
- Santa Cruz de Salinas
- São João do Paraíso
- Taiobeiras
- Vargem Grande do Rio Pardo
