= Immediate Geographic Region of Ponte Nova =

Urban administrative region in Minas Gerais, Brazil

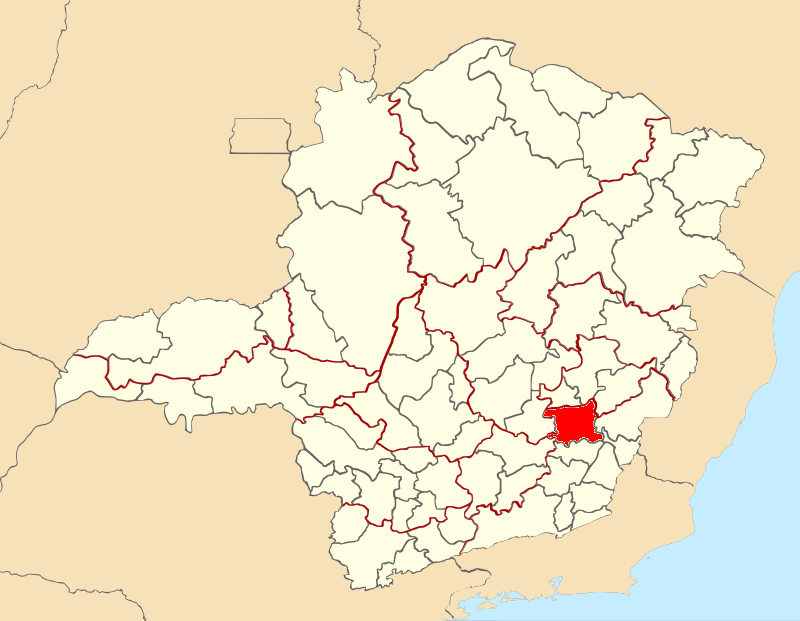
Immediate Geographic Region of Ponte Nova, in the state of Minas Gerais, Brazil.

The Immediate Geographic Region of Ponte Nova is one of the 10 immediate geographic regions in the Intermediate Geographic Region of Juiz de Fora, one of the 70 immediate geographic regions in the Brazilian state of Minas Gerais and one of the 509 of Brazil, created by the National Institute of Geography and Statistics (IBGE) in 2017.

== Municipalities ==
It comprises 19 municipalities.

- Acaiaca
- Alvinópolis
- Amparo da Serra
- Barra Longa
- Diogo de Vasconcelos
- Dom Silvério
- Guaraciaba
- Jequeri
- Oratórios
- Piedade de Ponte Nova
- Ponte Nova
- Rio Casca
- Rio Doce
- Santa Cruz do Escalvado
- Santo Antônio do Grama
- São Pedro dos Ferros
- Sem-Peixe
- Sericita
- Urucânia
