= Immediate Geographic Region of Espinosa =

Urban administrative region in Minas Gerais, Brazil

Immediate Geographic Region of Espinosa, in the state of Minas Gerais, Brazil.

The Immediate Geographic Region of Espinosa is one of the 7 immediate geographic regions in the Intermediate Geographic Region of Montes Claros, one of the 70 immediate geographic regions in the Brazilian state of Minas Gerais and one of the 509 of Brazil, created by the National Institute of Geography and Statistics (IBGE) in 2017.

== Municipalities ==
It comprises 8 municipalities.

- Catuti
- Espinosa
- Gameleiras
- Mamonas
- Mato Verde
- Monte Azul
- Montezuma
- Santo Antônio do Retiro
