= Matipó =

Brazilian municipality located in the state of Minas Gerais

Coordinates: 20°17′2″S 42°20′27″W

- Municipality
- Interactive map of Matipó
- Country: Brazil
- State: Minas Gerais
- Region: Southeast
- Time zone: UTC−3 (BRT)

Location of Matipó within Minas Gerais

Matipó is a Brazilian municipality located in the state of Minas Gerais. The city belongs to the mesoregion of Zona da Mata and to the microregion of Manhuaçu. As of 2020, the estimated population was 19,005.

== See also ==
- List of municipalities in Minas Gerais
