= Immediate Geographic Region of Cataguases =

Urban administrative region in Minas Gerais, Brazil

Immediate Geographic Region of Cataguases, in the state of Minas Gerais, Brazil.

The Immediate Geographic Region of Cataguases is one of the 10 immediate geographic regions in the Intermediate Geographic Region of Juiz de Fora, one of the 70 immediate geographic regions in the Brazilian state of Minas Gerais and one of the 509 of Brazil, created by the National Institute of Geography and Statistics (IBGE) in 2017.

== Municipalities ==
It comprises 10 municipalities.

- Argirita
- Astolfo Dutra
- Cataguases
- Dona Eusébia
- Itamarati de Minas
- Laranjal (Minas Gerais)
- Leopoldina (Minas Gerais)
- Palma (Minas Gerais)
- Recreio (Minas Gerais)
- Santana de Cataguases
