= Immediate Geographic Region of Além Paraíba =

Urban administrative region in Minas Gerais, Brazil

Immediate Geographic Region of Além Paraíba, in the state of Minas Gerais, Brazil.

The Immediate Geographic Region of Além Paraíba is one of the 10 immediate geographic regions in the Intermediate Geographic Region of Juiz de Fora, one of the 70 immediate geographic regions in the Brazilian state of Minas Gerais and one of the 509 of Brazil, created by the National Institute of Geography and Statistics (IBGE) in 2017.

== Municipalities ==
It comprises 5 municipalities.

- Além Paraíba
- Estrela Dalva
- Pirapetinga
- Santo Antônio do Aventureiro
- Volta Grande
