= Immediate Geographic Region of Caratinga =

Urban administrative region in Minas Gerais, Brazil

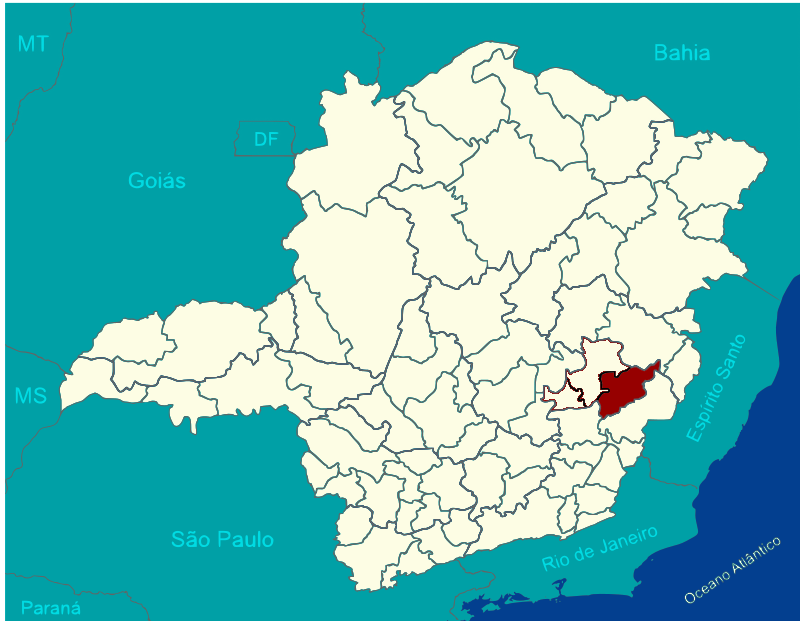
Immediate Geographic Region of Caratinga, in the state of Minas Gerais, Brazil.

The Immediate Geographic Region of Caratinga is one of the 3 immediate geographic regions in the Intermediate Geographic Region of Ipatinga, one of the 70 immediate geographic regions in the Brazilian state of Minas Gerais and one of the 509 of Brazil, created by the National Institute of Geography and Statistics (IBGE) in 2017.

== Municipalities ==
It comprises 16 municipalities:

- Alvarenga
- Bom Jesus do Galho
- Caratinga
- Córrego Novo
- Entre Folhas
- Imbé de Minas
- Inhapim
- Piedade de Caratinga
- Raul Soares
- Santa Bárbara do Leste
- Santa Rita de Minas
- São Domingos das Dores
- São Sebastião do Anta
- Ubaporanga
- Vargem Alegre
- Vermelho Novo
