= Immediate Geographic Region of Manhuaçu =

Urban administrative region in Minas Gerais, Brazil

Immediate Geographic Region of Manhuaçu, in the state of Minas Gerais, Brazil.

The Immediate Geographic Region of Manhuaçu is one of the 10 immediate geographic regions in the Intermediate Geographic Region of Juiz de Fora, one of the 70 immediate geographic regions in the Brazilian state of Minas Gerais and one of the 509 of Brazil, created by the National Institute of Geography and Statistics (IBGE) in 2017.

== Municipalities ==
It comprises 24 municipalities.

- Abre Campo
- Alto Caparaó
- Alto Jequitibá
- Caparaó
- Caputira
- Chalé (Minas Gerais)
- Conceição de Ipanema
- Durandé
- Ipanema (Minas Gerais)
- Lajinha
- Luisburgo
- Manhuaçu
- Manhumirim
- Martins Soares
- Matipó
- Mutum (Minas Gerais)
- Pocrane
- Reduto
- Santa Margarida (Minas Gerais)
- Santana do Manhuaçu
- São João do Manhuaçu
- São José do Mantimento
- Simonésia
- Taparuba
