= Intermediate and Immediate Geographic Regions =

Regional classifications used by Brazilian government since 2017

The Intermediate and Immediate geographic regions (Portuguese: Regiões geográficas Intermediárias e Imediatas) in Brazil constitute the country's regional geographic division, according to the composition prepared by the Brazilian Institute of Geography and Statistics (IBGE).

The immediate geographic regions are groupings of municipalities whose main reference is the urban network and have a local urban center as a base, through the IBGE analysis. For its elaboration, the connection of nearby cities through dependency relationships and displacement of the population in search of goods, provision of services and work were taken into consideration. Intermediate regions for their part, are groupings of immediate regions that are articulated through the influence of a metropolis, regional capital or representative urban center.

They were instituted in 2017 for updating the Brazilian regional division and correspond to an overview of old Meso and Microregions, respectively, which were in force from 1989.

== List of regions ==
As of 2017, there were 5,570 municipalities, divided among 133 Intermediate regions and 510 Immediate regions:

State	Intermediate	Immediate	Municipalities
Central-West Brazil	14	52	466
Goiás	6	22	246
Mato Grosso	5	18	141
Mato Grosso do Sul	3	12	79
Northeast Brazil	42	154	1794
Alagoas	2	11	102
Bahia	10	34	417
Ceará	6	18	184
Maranhão	5	22	217
Paraíba	4	15	223
Pernambuco	4	18	185
Piauí	6	19	224
Rio Grande do Norte	3	11	167
Sergipe	2	6	75
North Brazil	22	62	450
Acre	2	5	22
Amapá	2	4	16
Amazonas	4	11	62
Pará	7	21	144
Rondônia	2	6	52
Roraima	2	4	15
Tocantins	3	11	139
Southeast Brazil	33	145	1668
Espírito Santo	4	8	78
Minas Gerais	13	70	853
Rio de Janeiro	5	14	92
São Paulo	11	53	645
South Brazil	21	96	1191
Paraná	6	29	399
Rio Grande do Sul	8	43	497
Santa Catarina	7	24	295
Federal District	1	1	1
Total	133	510	5570
