= Campanário, Minas Gerais =

Brazilian municipality located in the northeast of the state of Minas Gerais

Coordinates: 18°14′20″S 41°44′52″W

Campanário
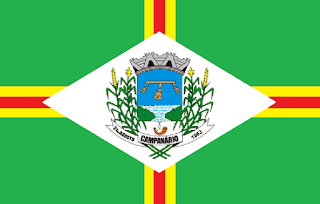
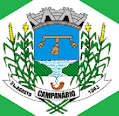
- Flag Coat of arms

- Country: Brazil
- Region: Southeast
- State: Minas Gerais
- Intermediate Geographic Region: Teófilo Otoni
- Immediate Geographic Region: Teófilo Otoni

Area
  - Total: 442,398 km^{2} (170,811 sq mi)
- Elevation: 268 m (879 ft)

Population (2020)
  - Total: 2,923
  - Density: 6.61/km^{2} (17.1/sq mi)
- Time zone: UTC−3 (BRT)
- Website: campanario.mg.gov.br

Campanário is a Brazilian municipality located in the northeast of the state of Minas Gerais. Its population as of 2020 was 3,730 people living in a total area of 441 km^{2} (170 sq mi). The city is part of the Immediate Geographic Region of Teófilo Otoni. It became a municipality in 1943.

== Geography ==
The city center of Campanário is located at an elevation of 268 meters on the important federal highway BR-116 between Governador Valadares and Teófilo Otoni. Neighboring municipalities are: Itambacuri (W and N), Frei Gaspar (NE), Pescador (E), Jampruca (S).

Distances

- Belo Horizonte: 420 km (south on BR-116 to Governador Valadares, then southwest on BR-341)
- Governador Valadares: 73 km south on BR-116
- Teófilo Otoni: 55 km north on BR-116
- Itambacuri: 30 km north on BR-116
- Pescador: 21 southeast on MG-311

== Economic activities ==
Services and agriculture are the main economic activities. The GDP in 2005 was approximately R$15 million (US$6.16 million), with 9 million reais from services, 1 million reais from industry, and 4 million reais from agriculture. There were 190 rural producers on 19,000 hectares of land (2006). Approximately 450 persons were occupied in agriculture. The main crops are sugarcane, beans, and corn. There were 23,000 head of cattle, of which 3,700 were milk cows (2006). Only 25 of the rural properties had tractors in 2006.

There were no banks (2007) In the vehicle fleet there were 161 automobiles, 10 trucks, 12 pickup trucks, 4 buses, and 70 motorcycles (2007).

== Health and education ==
In the health sector there were 2 health clinics (2005). Educational needs of 1,100 students were met by 3 primary schools, 1 middle school, and 1 pre-primary school.

- Municipal Human Development Index: 0.668 (2000)
- State ranking: 682 out of 853 municipalities as of 2000
- National ranking: 3,500 out of 5,138 municipalities as of 2000
- Literacy rate: 76%
- Life expectancy: 63 (average of males and females)
- Percentage of children under 5 years old in the population: 10.59 (all data below are from 2000)
- Percentage of adolescents in the population (10 to 19 years old): 22.32
- Percentage of old people in the population (60 years or more): 10.42
- Degree of urbanization: 70.96
- Percentage of urban homes connected to sewage system: 66.90

In 2000 the per capita monthly income of R$133 (US$72.7) was well below the state average of R$276 (US$150.87). Poços de Caldas had the highest per capita monthly income in 2000 with R$435 (US$237.78). The lowest was Setubinha with R$73 (US$39.9).

In terms of HDI, the highest ranking municipality in Minas Gerais in 2000 was Poços de Caldas with 0.841, while the lowest was Setubinha with 0.568. Nationally the highest was São Caetano do Sul in São Paulo with 0.919, while the lowest was Setubinha. In more recent statistics (considering 5,507 municipalities) Manari in the state of Pernambuco has the lowest rating in the country—0,467—putting it in last place.

== See also ==
- List of municipalities in Minas Gerais
