= Frei Gaspar =

- Municipality
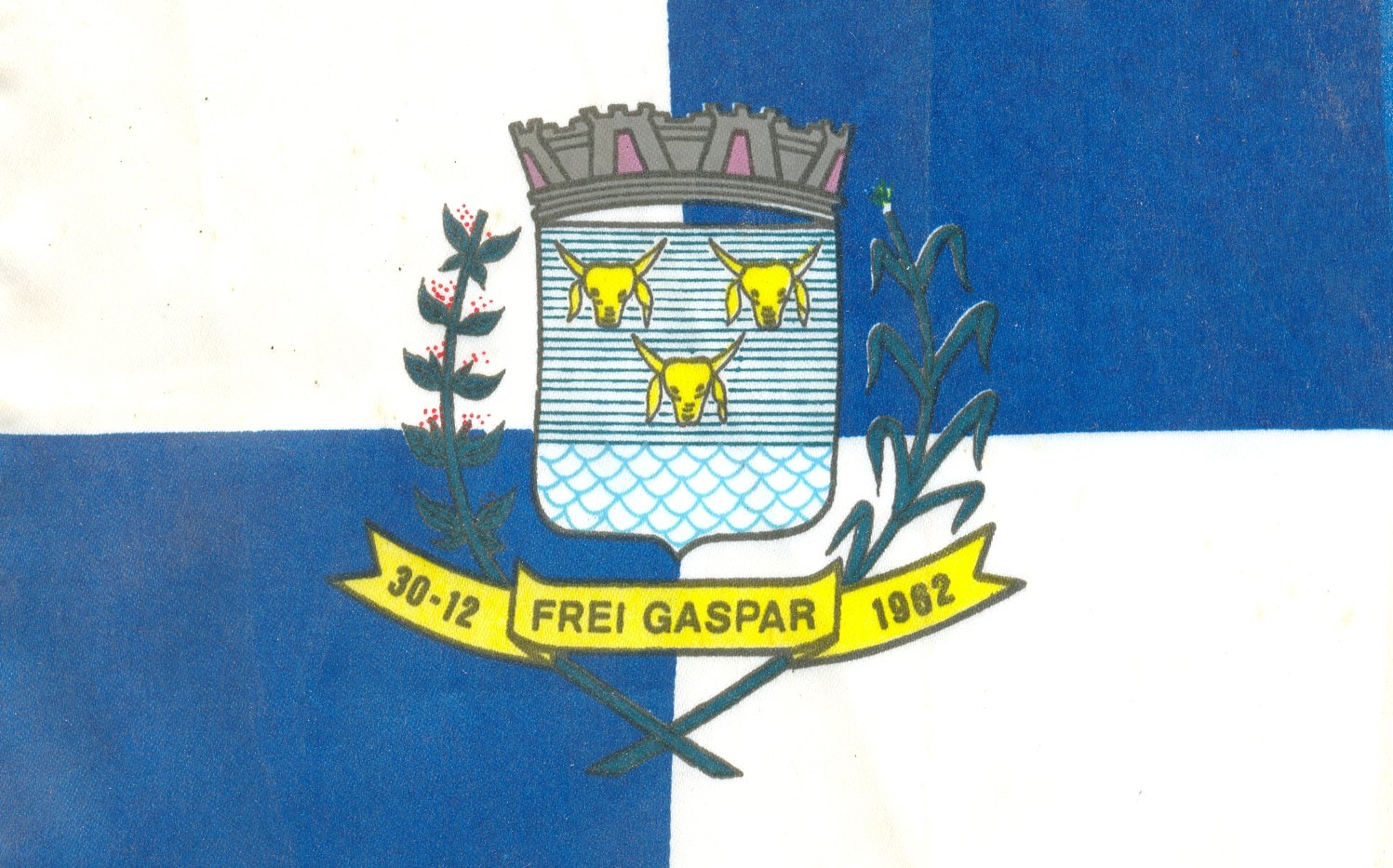
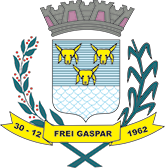
- Flag Coat of arms
- Nickname: Frei
- Location in Minas Gerais

- Location in Brazil
- Coordinates: 18°03′57″S 41°25′44″W
- Country: Brazil
- Region: Southeast
- State: Minas Gerais
- Intermediate Geographic Region: Teófilo Otoni
- Immediate Geographic Region: Teófilo Otoni

Government
  - Mayor: Lauro Franco

Area
  - Total: 628.303 km^{2} (242.589 sq mi)

Population (2020)
  - Total: 5,869
- Demonym: frei-gasparense
- Time zone: UTC−3 (BRT)
- Area code: (+55) 33
- Website: freigaspar.mg.gov.br

Frei Gaspar is a Brazilian municipality located in the northeast of the state of Minas Gerais. Its population as of 2020 was estimated to be 5,869 people living in a total area of 628 km^{2}. The city is part of the Immediate Geographic Region of Teófilo Otoni. It became a municipality in 1962.

== Geography ==
Frei Gaspar is located on at an elevation of 440 meters, 28 km southeast of Teófilo Otoni. The distance to the state capital, Belo Horizonte, is 546 km. Neighboring municipalities are: Teófilo Otoni, Ouro Verde de Minas, Ataléia, São José do Divino, Pescador, Campanário and Itambacuri.

== Economy ==
The main economic activities are services, small industries, and agriculture. The GDP in 2005 was R$20 million (US$8.22 million), with 11 million from services, 1 million from industry, and 7 million from agriculture. There were 368 rural producers on 30,000 hectares of land. Only 32 farms had tractors (2006). Approximately 900 persons were dependent on agriculture. The main crops were coffee, sugarcane, beans and corn. There were 37,000 head of cattle (2006). There were no banks (2007) and 112 automobiles (177 motorcycles), giving a ratio of 56 inhabitants per automobile.

== Health and education ==
There are 3 health clinics. Patients with more serious health conditions are transported to Teófilo Otoni. Educational needs were met by 7 primary schools, 1 middle school, and 1 pre-primary school.

== Municipal social indicators ==
- Municipal Human Development Index: 0.621 (2000)
- State ranking: 804 out of 853 municipalities as of 2000
- National ranking: 4,283 out of 5,138 municipalities as of 2000
- Literacy rate: 65%
- Life expectancy: 65 (average of males and females)

In 2000 the per capita monthly income of R$84 (US$45.92) was well below the state and national average of R$276.00 and R$297.00 respectively.

In terms of HDI, the highest ranking municipality in Minas Gerais in 2000 was Poços de Caldas with 0.841, while the lowest was Setubinha with 0.568. Nationally the highest was São Caetano do Sul in São Paulo with 0.919, while the lowest was Setubinha. In more recent statistics (considering 5,507 municipalities) Manari in the state of Pernambuco has the lowest rating in the country—0,467—putting it in last place.

== See also ==
- List of municipalities in Minas Gerais
