= Carlos Chagas, Minas Gerais =

Brazilian municipality located in the northeast of the state of Minas Gerais

Coordinates: 17°42′20″S 40°45′47″W

Carlos Chagas
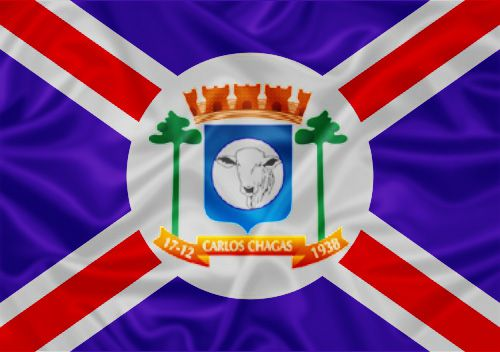
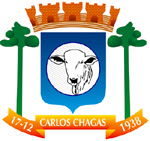
- Flag Coat of arms

- Country: Brazil
- Region: Southeast
- State: Minas Gerais
- Intermediate Geographic Region: Teófilo Otoni
- Immediate Geographic Region: Teófilo Otoni

Area
  - Total: 3,202.984 km^{2} (1,236.679 sq mi)
- Elevation: 157 m (515 ft)

Population (2020)
  - Total: 18,615
  - Density: 5.81/km^{2} (15.0/sq mi)
- Time zone: UTC−3 (BRT)
- Website: carloschagas.mg.gov.br

Carlos Chagas is a Brazilian municipality located in the northeast of the state of Minas Gerais. Its population as of 2020 was 18,674 living in a total area of 3,199 km^{2}. The city is part of the Immediate Geographic Region of Teófilo Otoni. It became a municipality in 1938, and is named for Carlos Chagas, a Brazilian natural scientist.

== Geography ==
Carlos Chagas is located at an elevation of 157 meters in the Rio Mucuri valley. It is just north of highway BR-418. The nearest major population center is Teófilo Otoni.

The distance to Teófilo Otoni is 107 km; and the distance to the state capital, Belo Horizonte, is 409 km. Neighboring municipalities are: Crisólita and Umburatiba (N); Nanuque and the state of Bahia (E); Ataleia, Nanuque and Ouro Verde de Minas (S); and Teófilo Otoni and Pavão, (W).

== Economy ==
The main economic activities are services, and agriculture. The GDP in 2005 was R$111 million (US$45.6 million), with 57 million from services, 14 million from industry, and 33 million from agriculture. There were 1021 rural producers on 201,000 hectares of land. Only 74 farms had tractors (2006). 3,200 persons were dependent on agriculture. The main crops were sugarcane, beans, and corn. There were 268,000 head of cattle (2006). There were 3 banks (2007) and 8691 automobiles (753 motorcycles), giving a ratio of 24 inhabitants per automobile.

== Social indicators ==
The social indicators rank it in the bottom tier of municipalities in the state.

- Municipal Human Development Index: 0.681 (2000)
- State ranking: 629 out of 853 municipalities as of 2000
- National ranking: 3,280 out of 5,138 municipalities as of 2000
- Literacy rate: 71%
- Life expectancy: 67 (average of males and females)

In terms of HDI, the highest ranking municipality in Minas Gerais in 2000 was Poços de Caldas with 0.841, while the lowest was Setubinha with 0.568. Nationally the highest was São Caetano do Sul in São Paulo with 0.919, while the lowest was Setubinha. In more recent statistics (considering 5,507 municipalities) Manari in the state of Pernambuco has the lowest rating in the country—0,467—putting it in last place.

== Health and education ==
There were 20 health clinics and one hospital with 59 beds in 2005. Patients with more serious health conditions are transported to Teófilo Otoni. Educational needs were met by 17 primary schools, 4 middle schools, and 5 pre-primary schools. In higher education there were two campuses: UNEC and UNOPAR

== See also ==
- List of municipalities in Minas Gerais
