= Pavão, Minas Gerais =

Brazilian municipality located in the northeast of the state of Minas Gerais

Coordinates: 17°25′41″S 41°00′01″W

Pavão
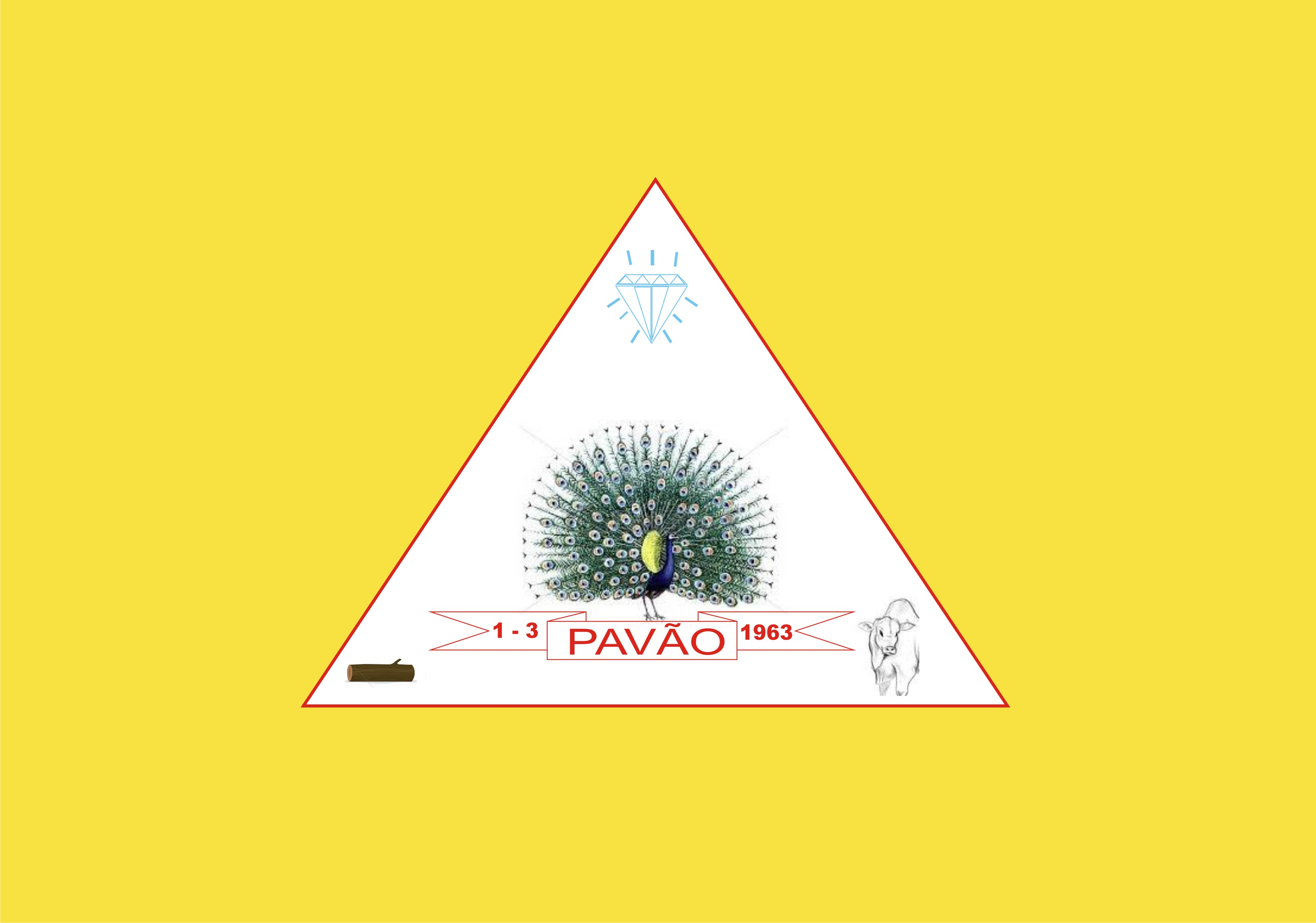
- Flag

- Location of Pavão in Minas Gerais
- Country: Brazil
- Region: Southeast
- State: Minas Gerais
- Intermediate Geographic Region: Teófilo Otoni
- Immediate Geographic Region: Teófilo Otoni

Area
  - Total: 601.190 km^{2} (232.121 sq mi)
- Elevation: 228 m (748 ft)

Population (2022)
  - Total: 8,047
  - Density: 13.39/km^{2} (34.7/sq mi)
- Time zone: UTC−3 (BRT)
- Website: pavao.mg.gov.br

Pavão is a Brazilian municipality located in the northeast of the state of Minas Gerais. Its population as of 2020 was estimated to be 8,419 people living in a total area of 599 km^{2}. The city belongs to the mesoregion of Vale do Mucuri and to the micro-region of Teófilo Otoni. It became a municipality in 1962.

== Geography ==
Pavão is located at an elevation of 228 meters, 108 km. northeast of Teófilo Otoni. The distance to the state capital, Belo Horizonte, is 545 km. Neighboring municipalities are: Novo Oriente de Minas, Crisólita, Carlos Chagas, and Teófilo Otoni.

== Economy ==
The main economic activities are services, small industries, and agriculture. A large percentage of the population lives in the rural area and is engaged in subsistence farming. The GDP in 2005 was approximately R$25 million (US$10.27 million), with 14 million Reais from services, 1 million Reais from industry, and 8 million Reais from agriculture. There were 651 rural producers on 79,000 hectares of land. Only 29 farms had tractors (2006). Approximately 2,000 persons were dependent on agriculture. Sugarcane, beans and corn were grown on a small scale. There were 45,000 head of cattle (2006). There was one bank (2007) and 295 automobiles (181 motorcycles), giving a ratio of 29 inhabitants per automobile.

== Health and education ==
There were 5 health clinics and 1 hospital with 44 beds. Patients with more serious health conditions are transported to Teófilo Otoni, although highway connections are poor. Educational needs were met by 6 primary schools, 2 middle schools, and 3 pre-primary schools.

== Social indicators ==
- Municipal Human Development Index: 0.667 (2000)
- State ranking: 683 out of 853 municipalities as of 2000
- National ranking: 3,503 out of 5,138 municipalities as of 2000
- Literacy rate: 67%
- Life expectancy: 70 (average of males and females)

In 2000 the per capita monthly income of R$103 (US$56.3) was well below the state and national average of R$276.00 and R$297.00 respectively.

In terms of HDI, the highest ranking municipality in Minas Gerais in 2000 was Poços de Caldas with 0.841, while the lowest was Setubinha with 0.568. Nationally the highest was São Caetano do Sul in São Paulo with 0.919, while the lowest was Setubinha. In more recent statistics (considering 5,507 municipalities) Manari in the state of Pernambuco has the lowest rating in the country—0,467—putting it in last place.

- Percentage of population aged less than 5 years old: 9.42 (2000)
- Percentage of population aged 10 to 19: 24.11
- Percentage of population aged 60 or more: 11.65
- Percentage of urbanization: 58.09
- Percentage of urban residences connected to sewage system: 91.40
- Infant mortality rate: 32.68 (in 1,000 live births)

== See also ==
- List of municipalities in Minas Gerais
