= Malacacheta =

Brazilian municipality located in the northeast of the state of Minas Gerais

Coordinates: 17°50′31″S 42°04′37″W

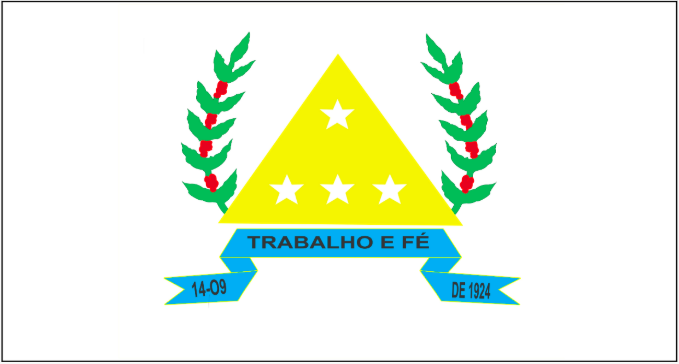
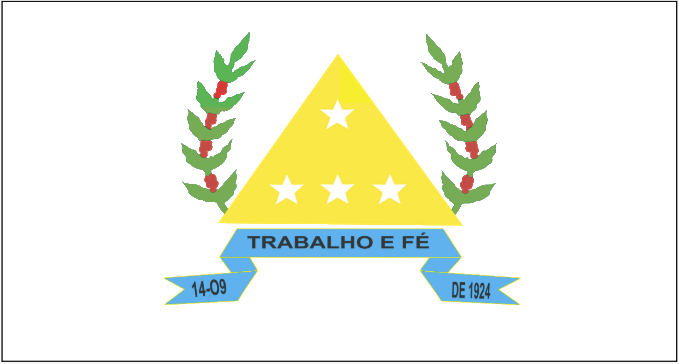
- Flag Coat of arms

- Location of Malacacheta in Minas Gerais
- Country: Brazil
- Region: Southeast
- State: Minas Gerais
- Intermediate Geographic Region: Teófilo Otoni
- Immediate Geographic Region: Teófilo Otoni

Area
  - Total: 727.886 km^{2} (281.038 sq mi)
- Elevation: 432 m (1,417 ft)

Population (2022)
  - Total: 17,516
  - Density: 24.06/km^{2} (62.3/sq mi)
- Time zone: UTC−3 (BRT)
- Website: malacacheta.mg.gov.br

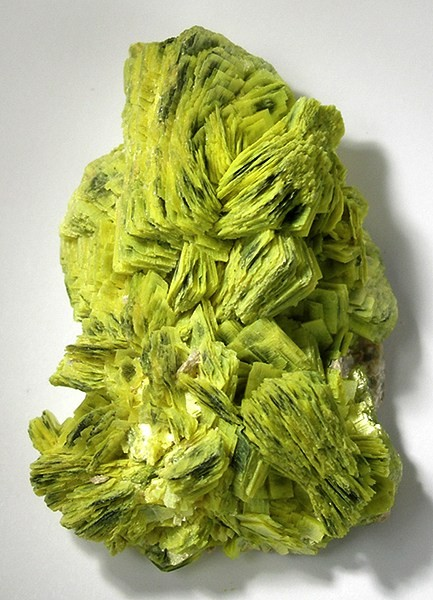
Meta-autunite, a uranium mineral, from São Pedro claim, Malacacheta. Size 4.5 x 3.0 1.7 cm.

Malacacheta is a Brazilian municipality located in the northeast of the state of Minas Gerais. Its population as of 2020 was estimated to be 18,602 people living in a total area of 719 km^{2}. The city is part of the Immediate Geographic Region of Teófilo Otoni. It became a municipality in 1924.

== Geography ==
Malacacheta is located at an elevation of 432 meters, 90 km. west of Teófilo Otoni. The distance to the state capital, Belo Horizonte, is 515 km. Neighboring municipalities are: Setubinha, Novo Cruzeiro, Ladainha, Poté, Franciscópolis and Água Boa.

== Economy ==
The main economic activities are services, small industries, and agriculture. A large percentage of the population is in the rural area and engaged in subsistence farming. The GDP in 2005 was R$54 million (US$22.18 million), with 37 million from services, 4 million from industry, and 10 million from agriculture. There were 960 rural producers on 35,000 hectares of land. Only 25 farms had tractors (2006). Approximately 2,700 persons were dependent on agriculture. The main cash crop was coffee while sugarcane, beans and corn were grown on a small scale. There were 33,000 heads of cattle (2006). There was one bank (2007) and 686 automobiles (629 motorcycles), giving a ratio of 26 inhabitants per automobile.

== Health and education ==
There were seven health clinics and two hospitals with 75 beds. Patients with more serious health conditions are transported to Teófilo Otoni. Educational needs were met by 23 primary schools, five middle schools, and three pre-primary schools.

== Municipal social indicators ==
- Municipal Human Development Index: 0.653 (2000)
- State ranking: 738 out of 853 municipalities as of 2000
- National ranking: 3,732 out of 5,138 municipalities as of 2000
- Literacy rate: 68%
- Life expectancy: 66 (average of males and females)

In 2000 the per capita monthly income of R$119 (US$65.05) was well below the state and national average of R$276.00 and R$297.00 respectively.

In terms of HDI, the highest ranking municipality in Minas Gerais in 2000 was Poços de Caldas with 0.841, while the lowest was Setubinha with 0.568. Nationally the highest was São Caetano do Sul in São Paulo with 0.919, while the lowest was Setubinha. In more recent statistics (considering 5,507 municipalities) Manari in the state of Pernambuco has the lowest rating in the country—0,467—putting it in last place.

- Percentage of population aged less than 5 years old: 11.15 (2000)
- Percentage of population aged 10 to 19: 23.95
- Percentage of population aged 60 or more: 9.87
- Percentage of urbanization: 69.10
- Percentage of urban residences connected to sewage system: 33.10
- Infant mortality rate: 19.75 (in 1,000 live births)

== Murder of four pre-schoolers in 1955 ==
In April 1955, a great tragedy took place on Good Friday. On the farm of São João da Mata in the hamlet, Catulé, which is a part of the municipality of Malacacheta, four pre-schoolers were hanged at their feet by members of a religious sect, the Adventist Church of the Promise, and killed with a cane. Seven other children were flogged. Some parents participated diligently; they considered it a magical ritual.

== See also ==
- List of municipalities in Minas Gerais
