= Franciscópolis =

Brazilian municipality located in the northeast of the state of Minas Gerais

Coordinates: 17°57′36″S 42°00′32″W

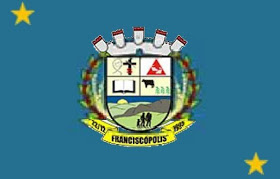
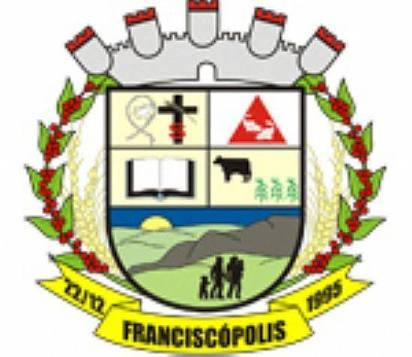
- Flag Coat of arms

- Country: Brazil
- Region: Southeast
- State: Minas Gerais
- Intermediate Geographic Region: Teófilo Otoni
- Immediate Geographic Region: Teófilo Otoni

Area
  - Total: 717.087 km^{2} (276.869 sq mi)
- Elevation: 380 m (1,250 ft)

Population (2022)
  - Total: 5,034
  - Density: 7.02/km^{2} (18.2/sq mi)
- Time zone: UTC−3 (BRT)
- Website: franciscopolis.mg.gov.br

Franciscópolis is a Brazilian municipality located in the northeast of the state of Minas Gerais. Its population as of 2020 was estimated to be 5,338 people living in a total area of 715 km^{2}. The city is part of the Immediate Geographic Region of Teófilo Otoni. It became a municipality in 1997.

== Geography ==
Franciscopolis is located on at an elevation of 380 meters, 70 km east of Teófilo Otoni. The distance to the state capital, Belo Horizonte, is 546 km. Neighboring municipalities are: Malacacheta, Poté, Água Boa, Itambacuri and Teófilo Otoni.

== Economy ==
The main economic activities are services, small industries, and agriculture. The GDP in 2005 was R$18 million (US$7.39 million), with 9 million from services, 1 million from industry, and 7 million from agriculture. There were 612 rural producers on 50,000 hectares of land. Only 22 farms had tractors (2006). Approximately 1,500 persons were dependent on agriculture. The main crops were coffee, sugarcane, beans and corn. There were 33,000 head of cattle (2006). There were no banks (2007) and 85 automobiles (122 motorcycles), giving a ratio of 66 inhabitants per automobile.

== Health and education ==
There was 1 health clinic. Patients with more serious health conditions are transported to Teófilo Otoni. Educational needs were met by 3 primary schools, 1 middle school, and 1 pre-primary school.

== Social indicators ==
- Municipal Human Development Index: 0.605 (2000)
- State ranking: 824 out of 853 municipalities as of 2000
- National ranking: 4,580 out of 5,138 municipalities as of 2000
- Literacy rate: 63%
- Life expectancy: 65 (average of males and females)

In 2000 the per capita monthly income of R$71 (US$38.81) was well below the state and national average of R$276.00 and R$297.00 respectively.

In terms of HDI, the highest ranking municipality in Minas Gerais in 2000 was Poços de Caldas with 0.841, while the lowest was Setubinha with 0.568. Nationally the highest was São Caetano do Sul in São Paulo with 0.919, while the lowest was Setubinha. In more recent statistics (considering 5,507 municipalities) Manari in the state of Pernambuco has the lowest rating in the country—0,467—putting it in last place.

- Percentage of population aged less than 5 years old: 11.54 (2000)
- Percentage of population aged 10 to 19: 24.74
- Percentage of population aged 60 or more: 10.08
- Percentage of urbanization: 31.89
- Percentage of urban residences connected to sewage system: 25.30
- Infant mortality rate: N/A (in 1,000 live births)

== See also ==
- List of municipalities in Minas Gerais
