= Catuji =

Brazilian municipality

Coordinates: 17°18′43″S 41°31′01″W

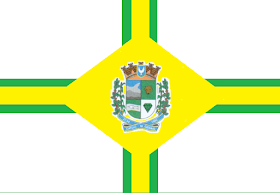
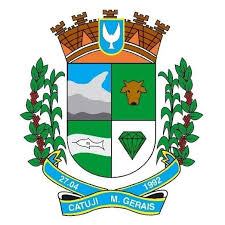
- Flag Coat of arms

- Country: Brazil
- Region: Southeast
- State: Minas Gerais
- Intermediate Geographic Region: Teófilo Otoni
- Immediate Geographic Region: Teófilo Otoni

Area
  - Total: 3,202.984 km^{2} (1,236.679 sq mi)
- Elevation: 625 m (2,051 ft)

Population (2020)
  - Total: 7,030
  - Density: 16.76/km^{2} (43.4/sq mi)
- Time zone: UTC−3 (BRT)
- Website: catuji.mg.gov.br

Catuji is a Brazilian municipality located in the northeast of the state of Minas Gerais. Its population as of 2020 was estimated to be 6,257 people living in a total area of 421 km^{2}. The city is part of the Immediate Geographic Region of Teófilo Otoni. It became a municipality in 1993. Its name comes from the Tupi language, catú-g-y, meaning "good river" or "good water".

The region is famous for its unique rock formations of which Pedra do Chifre and Pedra de Santa Rosa are the most interesting.

== Geography ==
Catuji is located on highway BR-116 at an elevation of 625 meters, 72 km north of Teófilo Otoni. The distance to the state capital, Belo Horizonte, is 513 km. Neighboring municipalities are: Teófilo Otoni, Itaipé, Novo Oriente de Minas and Padre Paraíso.

== Economy ==
The main economic activities are services, small industries, and agriculture. The GDP in 2005 was R$18 million (US$7.39 million), with 12 million from services, 2 million from industry, and 3 million from agriculture. There were 600 rural producers on 13,000 hectares of land. Only 7 farms had tractors (2006). Approximately 1,700 persons were dependent on agriculture. The main crops were bananas, coffee, sugarcane, beans and corn. There were 7,000 head of cattle (2006). There were no banks (2007) and 166 automobiles (145 motorcycles), giving a ratio of 40 inhabitants per automobile.

== Health and education ==
There were 4 health clinics. Patients with more serious health conditions are transported to Teófilo Otoni. Educational needs were met by 17 primary schools, 1 middle school, and 1 pre-primary school.

== Municipal social indicators ==
- Municipal Human Development Index: 0.621 (2000)
- State ranking: 803 out of 853 municipalities as of 2000
- National ranking: 4,280 out of 5,138 municipalities as of 2000
- Literacy rate: 64%
- Life expectancy: 65 (average of males and females)

In 2000 the per capita income of R$82 (US$44.82) was well below the state and national average of R$276.00 and R$297.00 respectively.

In terms of HDI, the highest ranking municipality in Minas Gerais in 2000 was Poços de Caldas with 0.841, while the lowest was Setubinha with 0.568. Nationally the highest was São Caetano do Sul in São Paulo with 0.919, while the lowest was Setubinha. In more recent statistics (considering 5,507 municipalities) Manari in the state of Pernambuco has the lowest rating in the country—0,467—putting it in last place.

- Percentage of population aged less than 5 years old: 11.18 (2000)
- Percentage of population aged 10 to 19: 27.01
- Percentage of population aged 60 or more: 8.83
- Percentage of urbanization: 21.47
- Percentage of urban residences connected to sewage system: 83.40
- Infant mortality rate: 20.69 (in 1,000 live births)

== See also ==
- List of municipalities in Minas Gerais
