= Caraí =

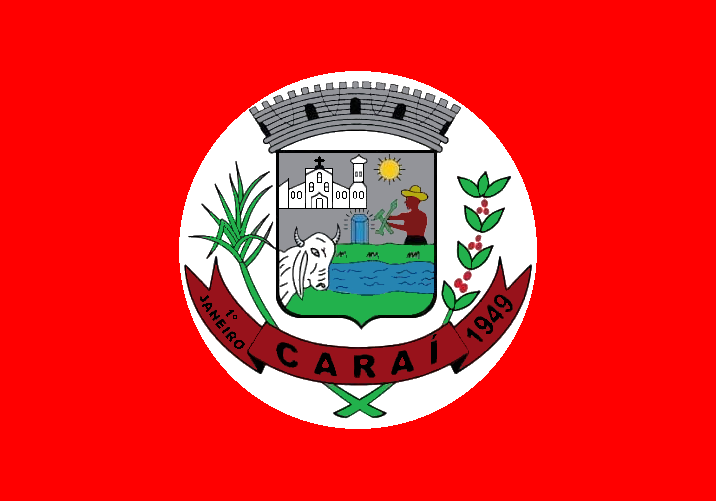
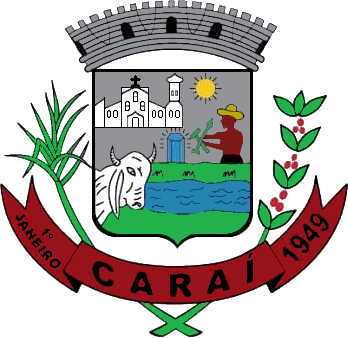
- Flag Coat of arms

- Location in the state of Minas Gerais

- Location in Brazil
- Coordinates: 17°11′20″S 41°41′42″W
- Country: Brazil
- State: Minas Gerais
- Intermediate Geographic Region: Teófilo Otoni
- Immediate Geographic Region: Teófilo Otoni
- Incorporated (municipality): 27 December 1948

Government
  - Mayor: Heber Gomes Neiva

Area
  - Total: 1,242.345 km^{2} (479.672 sq mi)
- Elevation: 750 m (2,460 ft)

Population (2020)
  - Total: 23,780
  - Density: 19.14/km^{2} (49.58/sq mi)
- Demonym: caraiense
- Time zone: UTC−3 (BRT)
- CEP postal code: 39810-000
- Area code: 33
- Website: carai.mg.gov.br

Caraí is a Brazilian municipality located in the northeast of the state of Minas Gerais. Its population as of 2020 was estimated to be 23,780 people living in a total area of 1,240 km^{2}. The city is part of the Immediate Geographic Region of Teófilo Otoni. The elevation of the municipal seat is 750 meters. It became a municipality in 1948.

The economy is based on cattle raising, services, and subsistence agriculture, with the main crops being coffee (2,600 ha.), rice, beans, sugarcane, and corn. The cattle herd had 17,000 head in 2006. In 2005 there were 2633 rural producers but only 20 tractors. 8,700 people were dependent on agriculture. As of 2005 there were 8 public health clinics, with none carrying out diagnosis and complete therapy. There was one hospital with 35 beds. Educational needs were met by 29 primary schools, 3 middle schools and 7 nursery schools. There were 231 automobiles in 2006, giving a ratio of 90 inhabitants per automobile (there were 525 motorcycles). There was 1 bank in 2007.

Neighboring municipalities are: Padre Paraíso - Catuji - Itaipé - Novo Cruzeiro - Araçuaí. The distance to Belo Horizonte, the state capital, is 536 km. The distance to the nearest major population center, Teófilo Otoni, is 80 km.

== Social Indicators ==
Caraí is ranked low on the MHDI and was one of the poorest municipalities in the state and in the country in 2000.

- MHDI: .636 (2000)
- State ranking: 775 out of 853 municipalities
- National ranking: 4,001 out of 5,138 municipalities in 2000
- Life expectancy: 67
- Literacy rate: 65
- Combined primary, secondary and tertiary gross enrolment ratio: .787
- Per capita income (monthly): R$84.00
- Degree of urbanization: 31.94
- Percentage of urban residences connected to sewage system: 73.30
- Infant mortality rate: 35.44

The above figures can be compared with those of Poços de Caldas, which had an MHDI of .841, the highest in the state of Minas Gerais. The highest in the country was São Caetano do Sul in the state of São Paulo with an MHDI of .919. The lowest was Manari in the state of Pernambuco with an MHDI of .467 out of a total of 5504 municipalities in the country as of 2004.

== See also ==
- List of municipalities in Minas Gerais
