= Novo Cruzeiro =

Human settlement in Brazil

Coordinates: 17°28′04″S 41°52′30″W

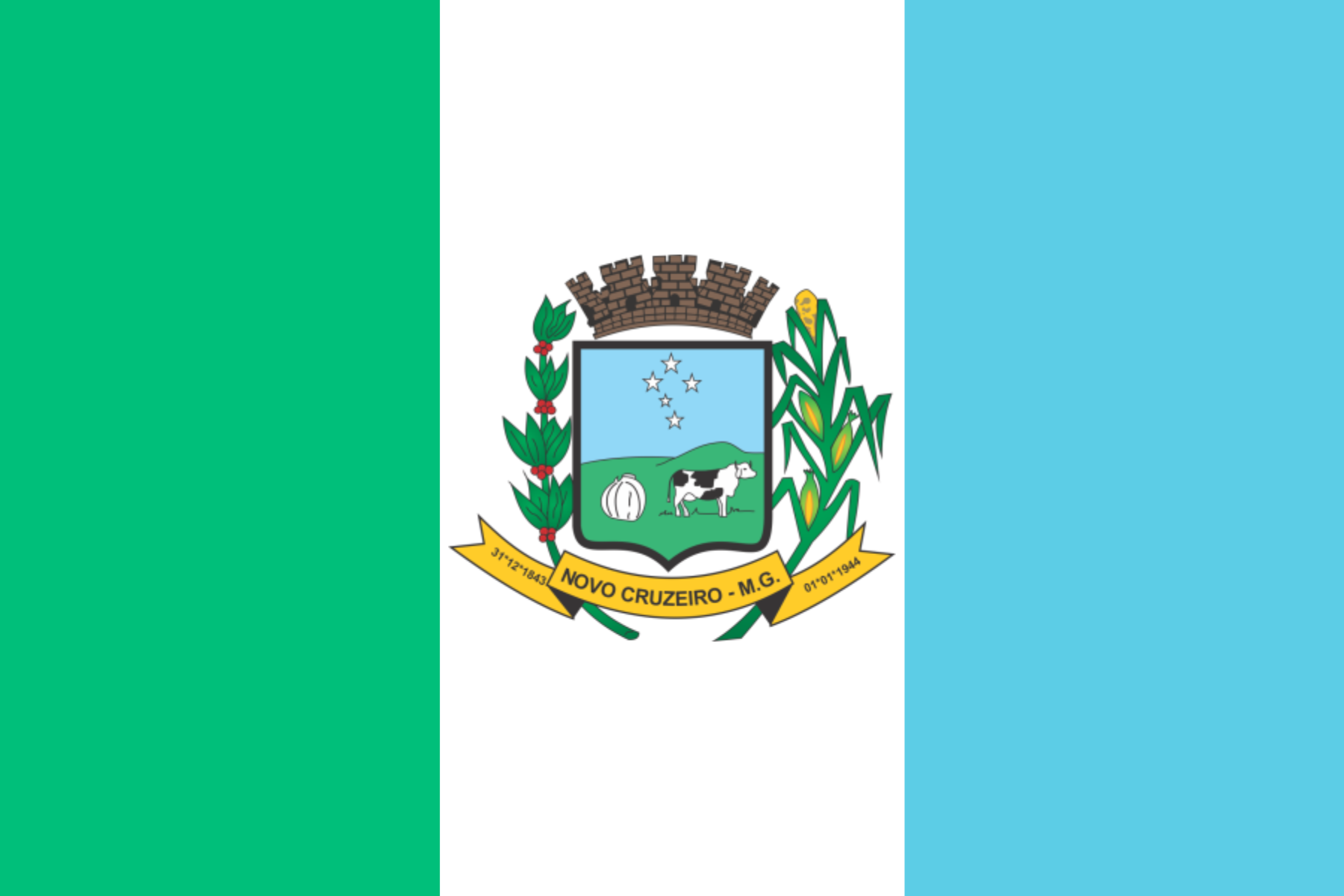
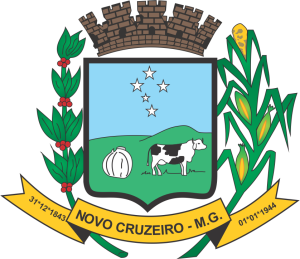
- Flag Coat of arms

- Location of Novo Cruzeiro in Minas Gerais
- Country: Brazil
- Region: Southeast
- State: Minas Gerais
- Intermediate Geographic Region: Teófilo Otoni
- Immediate Geographic Region: Teófilo Otoni

Area
  - Total: 1,702.981 km^{2} (657.525 sq mi)
- Elevation: 980 m (3,220 ft)

Population (2022)
  - Total: 26,975
  - Density: 15.84/km^{2} (41.0/sq mi)
- Time zone: UTC−3 (BRT)
- Website: www.novocruzeiro.mg.gov.br

Novo Cruzeiro is a Brazilian municipality located in the northeast of the state of Minas Gerais. Its population as of 2020 was estimated to be 31,335 people living in a total area of 1,701 km^{2}. The city belongs to the mesoregion of Jequitinhonha and to the microregion of Araçuaí. The elevation of the municipal seat is 980 meters. It became a municipality in 1943.

Most of the population lives in the rural area, with over 10,000 people still engaged in agriculture, which is mainly subsistence.

== History ==
Novo Cruzeiro was founded by Anastácio Roque Esteves, who settled here in 1917 along the banks of the Ribeirão São Bento, a tributary of the Rio Gravatá. The first name was Fazenda Santa Maria do Ribeirão da Pedra, then Vila Gravatá, São Bento, and finally Novo Cruzeiro, the name coming from the change of the currency of the country from mil réis to the Cruzeiro.

The town was once connected with the south by a railroad line, Estrada de Ferro Bahia e Minas, which was extinguished in 1965. Several of the old stations have been restored and are now used as public buildings.

== Economy ==
The economy is based on cattle raising, services, and subsistence agriculture, with the main crops being coffee (5,500 ha.), rice, beans, sugarcane, and corn. The cattle herd had 18,000 head in 2006. In 2005 there were 3318 rural producers but only 47 tractors. 10,300 people were dependent on agriculture. As of 2005 there were 10 public health clinics, with 2 carrying out diagnosis and complete therapy. There was one hospital with 42 beds. Educational needs were met by 37 primary schools, 6 middle schools and 6 nursery schools. There were 569 automobiles in 2006, giving a ratio of 60 inhabitants per automobile (there were 1650 motorcycles). There was 1 bank in 2007.

== Geography ==
Neighboring municipalities are: Araçuaí - Caraí - Itaipé - Ladainha - Setubinha - Minas Novas - Chapada do Norte - and Jenipapo de Minas. The distance to Belo Horizonte is 557 km. The distance to the nearest major population center, Teófilo Otoni is 111 km. As of 2002 most of the access roads were still not paved.

== Social indicators ==
Novo Cruzeiro is ranked low on the MHDI and was one of the poorest municipalities in the state and in the country in 2000.

- MHDI: .629 (2000)
- State ranking: 791 out of 853 municipalities
- National ranking: 4,147 out of 5,138 municipalities in 2000
- Life expectancy: 64
- Literacy rate: 61
- Combined primary, secondary and tertiary gross enrolment ratio: .745
- Per capita income (monthly): R$125.00

The above figures can be compared with those of Poços de Caldas, which had an MHDI of .841, the highest in the state of Minas Gerais. The highest in the country was São Caetano do Sul in the state of São Paulo with an MHDI of .919. The lowest was Manari in the state of Pernambuco with an MHDI of .467 out of a total of 5504 municipalities in the country as of 2004.

== See also ==
- List of municipalities in Minas Gerais
