= Poté =

Municipality in Minas Gerais, Brazil

Coordinates: 17°48′27″S 41°47′09″W

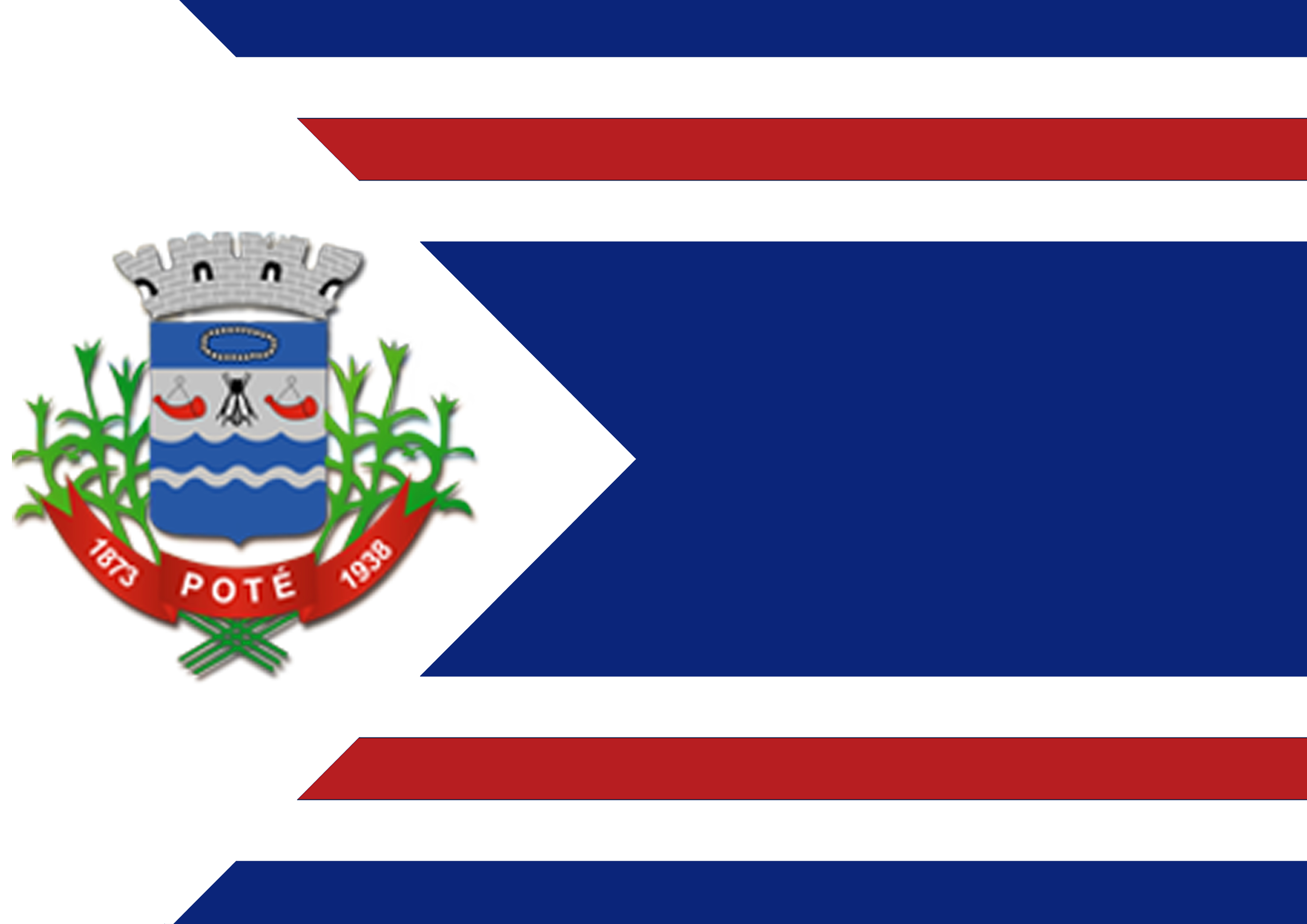
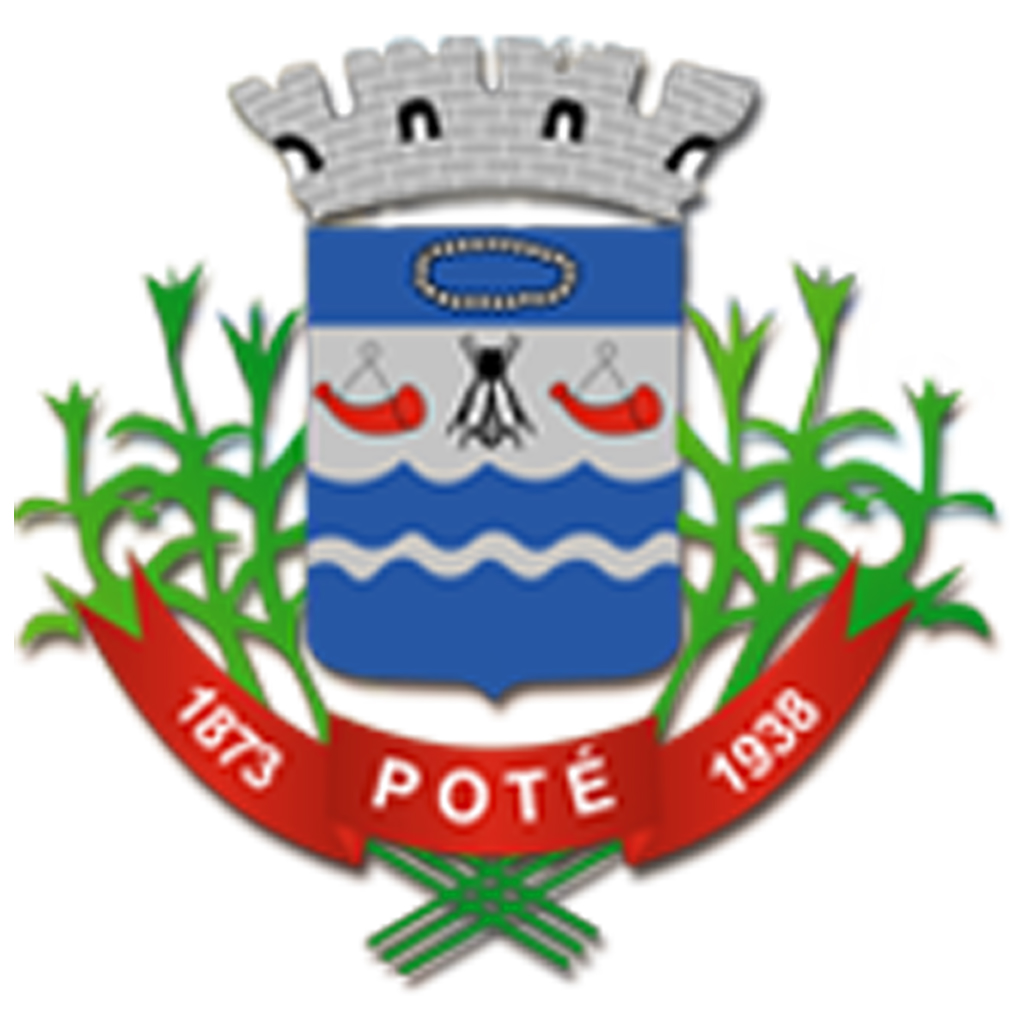
- Flag Coat of arms

- Country: Brazil
- State: Minas Gerais
- Intermediate Geographic Region: Teófilo Otoni
- Immediate Geographic Region: Teófilo Otoni
- Elevation: 549 m (1,801 ft)

Population (2020)
  - Total: 16,616
- Time zone: UTC−3 (BRT)

Poté is a Brazilian municipality located in the northeast of the state of Minas Gerais. Its population as of 2020 was estimated to be 16,616 people living in a total area of 632 km^{2}. The city is part of the Immediate Geographic Region of Teófilo Otoni. It became a municipality in 1938.

== Name ==
The name is derived from a semi-legendary figure called Poté, who was an indigenous leader of the Botocudo, the first inhabitants of the region.

== Geography ==
Poté is located at an elevation of 549 meters, 40 km. west of Teófilo Otoni. The distance to the state capital, Belo Horizonte, is 486 km. Neighboring municipalities are: Ladainha, Teófilo Otoni, Itambacuri, Franciscópolis, and Malacacheta.

== Economy ==
The main economic activities of Poté are services, small industries, and agriculture. A large percentage of the population lives in the rural area and is engaged in subsistence farming. The GDP in 2005 was approximately R$42 million (US$17.25 million), with R$30 million from services, R$3 million from industry, and R$6 million from agriculture. There were 513 rural producers on 24,000 hectares of land. Only 24 farms had tractors (2006). Approximately 1,500 persons were dependent on agriculture. The main cash crop was coffee while sugarcane, beans, and corn were grown on a small scale. There were 27,000 head of cattle (2006). There was one bank (2007) and 562 automobiles (687 motorcycles), giving a ratio of 26 inhabitants per automobile.

== Health and education ==
There were 7 health clinics and 1 hospital with 34 beds. Patients with more serious health conditions are transported to Teófilo Otoni. Educational needs were met by 22 primary schools, 1 middle school, and 6 pre-primary schools.

- Municipal Human Development Index: 0.642 (2000)
- State ranking: 767 out of 853 municipalities as of 2000
- National ranking: 3,886 out of 5,138 municipalities as of 2000
- Literacy rate: 67%
- Life expectancy: 65 (average of males and females)

In 2000, the per-capita monthly income of R$99 (US$54.12) was well below the state and national average of R$276.00 and R$297.00 respectively.

The highest ranking municipality in Minas Gerais in 2000 was Poços de Caldas, with 0.841, while the lowest was Setubinha, with 0.568. Nationally, the highest was São Caetano do Sul in São Paulo, with 0.919, while the lowest was Setubinha. In more recent statistics (considering 5,507 municipalities), Manari in the state of Pernambuco has the lowest rating in the country—0,467—putting it in last place.

- Percentage of population aged less than 5 years old: 10.17% (2000)
- Percentage of population aged 10–19: 24.11%
- Percentage of population aged 60 or more: 12.18%
- Percentage of urbanization: 55.49%
- Percentage of urban residences connected to sewage system: 37.90%
- Infant mortality rate: 3.97% (in 1,000 live births)

== See also ==
- List of municipalities in Minas Gerais
