= Ladainha, Minas Gerais =

Municipality in Minas Gerais, Brazil

Ladainha
- Municipality
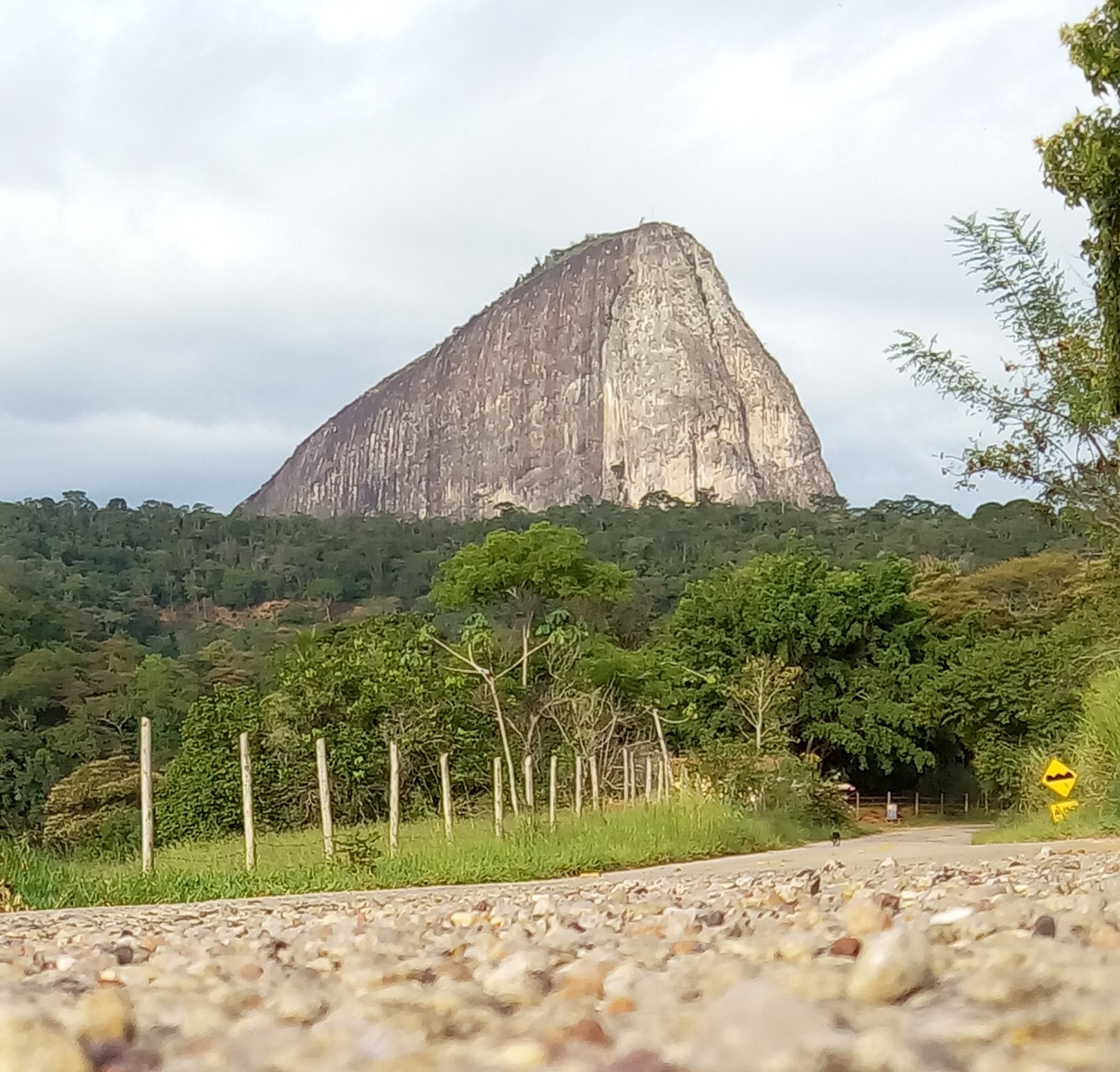
- Pedra da Marta Rocha

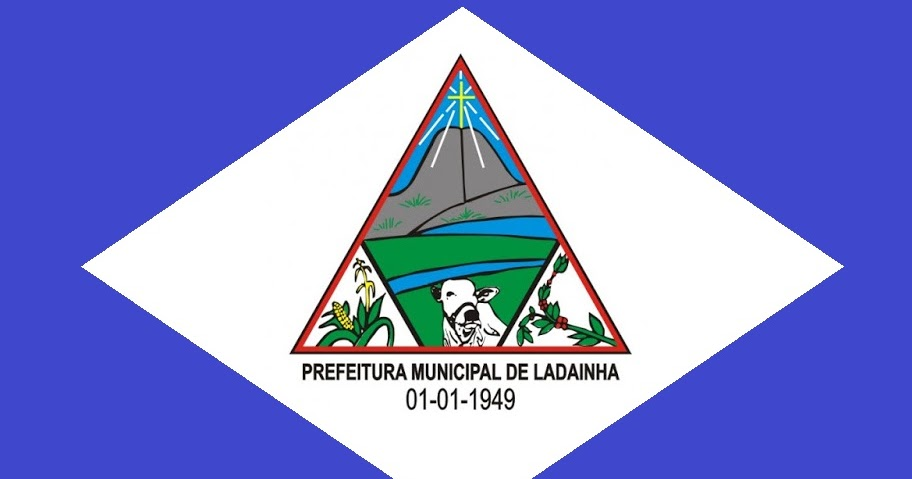
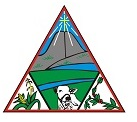
- Flag Coat of arms

- Location in Minas Gerais

- Location in Brazil
- Coordinates: 17°37′55″S 41°44′16″W
- Country: Brazil
- Region: Southeast
- State: Minas Gerais
- Intermediate region: Teófilo Otoni
- Immediate region: Teófilo Otoni
- Municipality created: 27 December 1948
- Installed: 1 January 1949
- Districts: Ladainha, Concórdia do Mucuri

Government
  - Mayor: Ronan Jardim Cesar (2025–2028) (Avante)

Area
  - Total: 866.290 km^{2} (334.476 sq mi)

Population (2022)
  - Total: 14,383
  - Estimate (2025): 14,263
  - Density: 16.603/km^{2} (43.002/sq mi)
- Demonym: ladainhense

Socioeconomic indicators
  - HDI (2010): 0.541
  - GDP per capita (2023): R$11,687
- Time zone: UTC−3 (BRT)
- Postal code: 39825-000
- Area code: 33
- Website: www.ladainha.mg.gov.br

Ladainha is a municipality in the Mucuri Valley of northeastern Minas Gerais, Brazil. It belongs to the Immediate Geographic Region of Teófilo Otoni and the Intermediate Geographic Region of Teófilo Otoni. The municipality covers 866.290 km^{2} (334.476 sq mi). Its population was 14,383 in the 2022 census and was estimated at 14,263 in 2025.

The railway reached Ladainha in 1918. Its workshops assembled and maintained locomotives for the Bahia and Minas Railway. The municipality was created in 1948 and installed in 1949. It consists of the districts of Ladainha and Concórdia do Mucuri.

== History ==
The district of Sete Posses was created under Teófilo Otoni on 12 May 1894. It took the name Concórdia in 1902 and Ladainha in 1929. In 1938, the district passed to the newly created municipality of Poté.

The Bahia and Minas Railway reached Ladainha in 1918. Construction of its central workshops and employee housing was authorized in 1922. Workers and merchants settled near the station and workshops, where locomotives were assembled and repaired.

State Law No. 336 separated Ladainha from Poté and created the municipality on 27 December 1948. It was installed on 1 January 1949. State Law No. 1,039 created the district of Concórdia do Mucuri in 1953.

The railway tracks through Ladainha were removed in 1966.

== Geography ==
Ladainha covers 866.290 km^{2} (334.476 sq mi) in northeastern Minas Gerais. It borders Novo Cruzeiro, Itaipé, Teófilo Otoni, Poté, Malacacheta, and Setubinha. The municipality consists of the districts of Ladainha and Concórdia do Mucuri.

The municipality lies in the Mucuri River basin. The North Mucuri River crosses its territory, and the Bom Sucesso stream joins it near the municipal seat.

The terrain is strongly rolling, with elevations from 378 to 1,131 m (1,240 to 3,711 ft). Ladainha lies entirely inside the Alto do Mucuri Environmental Protection Area and within the Atlantic Forest biome.

== Economy ==
Services made up about 75% of Ladainha's GDP in 2021. Of the 839 formal jobs counted that year, 609 were in public administration. The municipality's GDP per capita was R$11,687 in 2023.

Eucalyptus plantations and cattle raising account for much of the land used for agriculture and forestry. These activities occupied a little over 35% of the municipal territory. Small industrial operations extract ornamental stone and construction sand.

== See also ==
- List of municipalities in Minas Gerais
