= Padre Paraíso =

Coordinates: 17°04′S 41°29′W

- Municipality
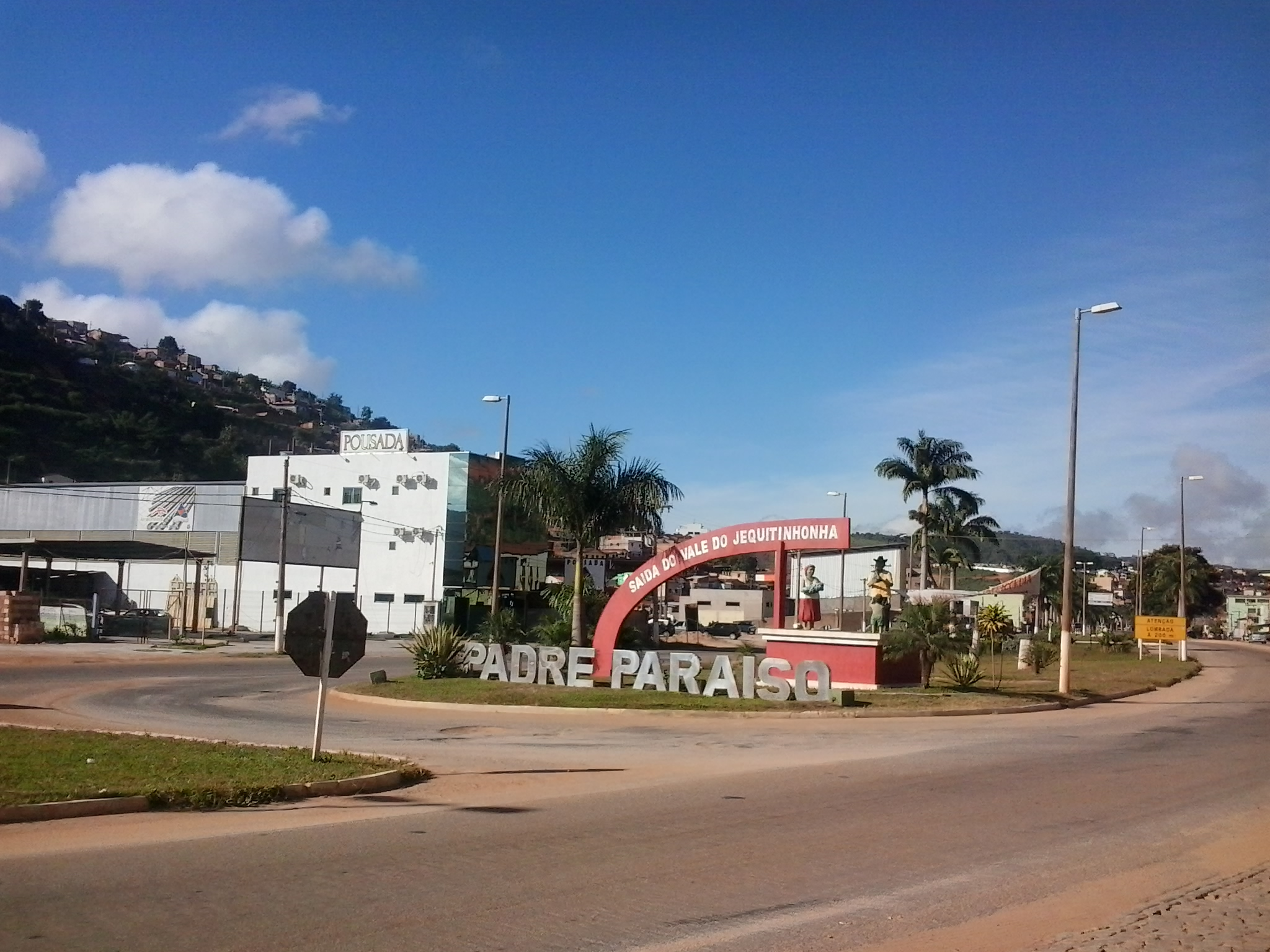
- BR-116 in the city

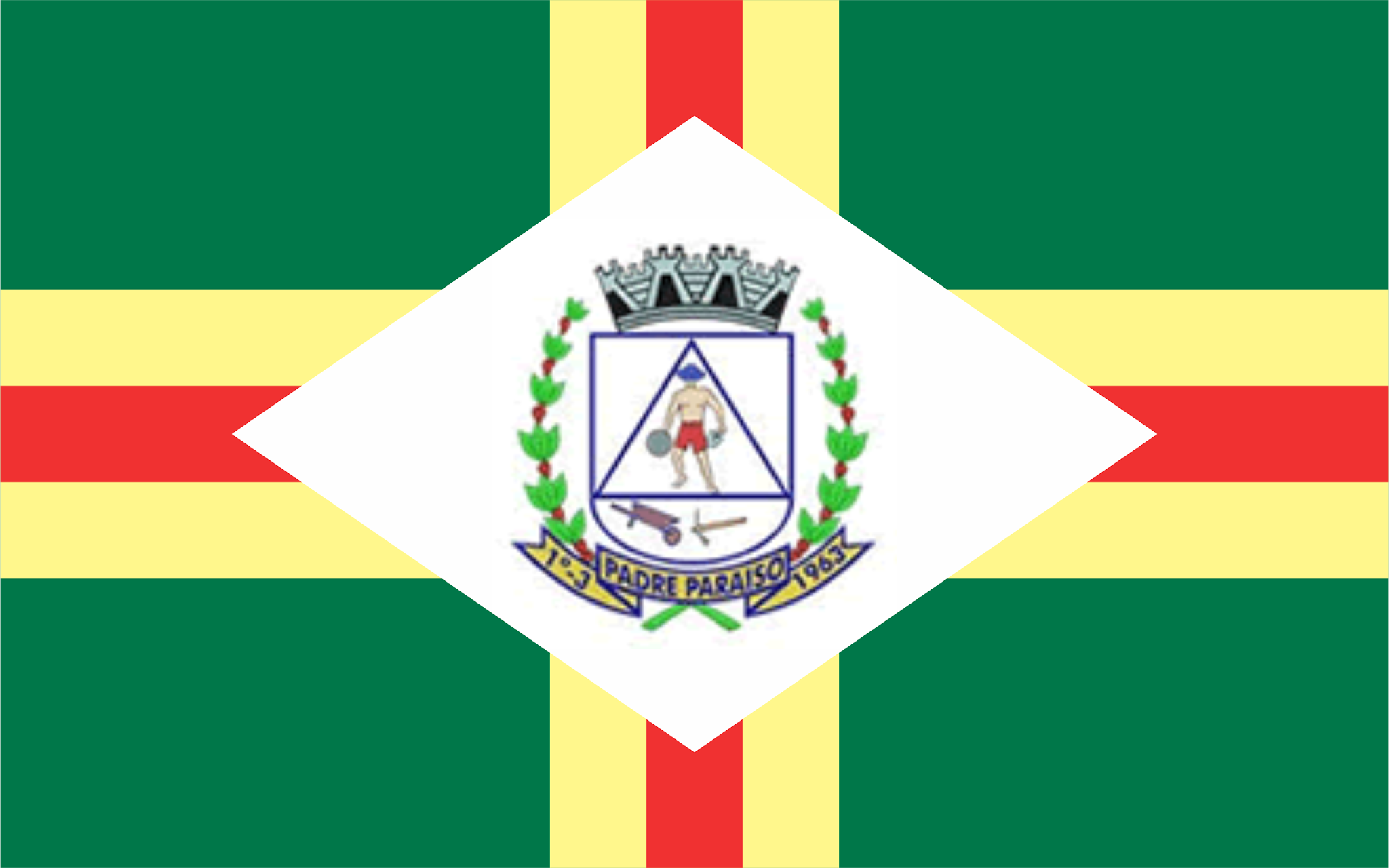
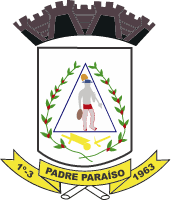
- Flag Coat of arms

- Country: Brazil
- State: Minas Gerais
- Intermediate Geographic Region: Teófilo Otoni
- Immediate Geographic Region: Teófilo Otoni
- Incorporated: 30 December 1962

Government
  - Mayor: Diego Ferdinando Mendes Oliveira (Solidariedade)

Area
  - Total: 543,942 km^{2} (210,017 sq mi)

Population (2020)
  - Total: 20,252
  - Density: 36.3/km^{2} (94/sq mi)
- Demonym: Padre-paraisense
- Time zone: UTC−3 (BRT)
- Postal Code: 39818-000
- Area code(s): +55 33
- Website: padreparaiso.mg.gov

Padre Paraíso is a Brazilian municipality located in the northeast of the state of Minas Gerais. Its population as of 2020 was estimated to be 20,252 people living in a total area of 543 km^{2}. The city belongs to the mesoregion of Jequitinhonha and to the microregion of Araçuaí. It became a municipality in 1962.

== Geography ==
Padre Paraíso is located on the Rio-Bahia highway (BR-116) at an elevation of 664 meters (center of the town). The climate is semi-arid and the region is mountainous. Neighboring municipalities are: Ponto dos Volantes - Caraí - Araçuaí. The distance to Belo Horizonte is 542 km. The distance to the nearest major population center, Teófilo Otoni is 94 km.

== Economy ==
The economy is based on cattle raising, services, and subsistence agriculture, with the main crops being coffee, beans, manioc, sugarcane, and corn. The cattle herd had 8,000 head in 2006. In 2005 there were 639 rural producers but only 7 tractors. 2,100 persons were dependent on agriculture. As of 2005 there were 17 health clinics and 1 private hospital with 42 beds. Educational needs were met by 23 primary schools, 3 middle schools and 4 nursery schools. There were 959 automobiles in 2006, giving a ratio of 17 inhabitants per automobile (there were 790 motorcycles). There was 1 bank in 2007.

== Social indicators ==
Padre Paraíso is ranked low on the MHDI and was one of the poorest municipalities in the state and in the country in 2000.

- MHDI: .656 (2000)
- State ranking: 726 out of 853 municipalities
- National ranking: 3,673 out of 5,138 municipalities in 2000
- Life expectancy: 67
- Literacy rate: 70
- Combined primary, secondary and tertiary gross enrolment ratio: .774
- Per capita income (monthly): R$94.00

The above figures can be compared with those of Poços de Caldas, which had an MHDI of .841, the highest in the state of Minas Gerais. The highest in the country was São Caetano do Sul in the state of São Paulo with an MHDI of .919. The lowest was Manari in the state of Pernambuco with an MHDI of .467 out of a total of 5504 municipalities in the country as of 2004.

== See also ==
- List of municipalities in Minas Gerais
