= Itaipé =

Brazilian municipality located in the northeast of the state of Minas Gerais

Coordinates: 17°24′07″S 41°40′08″W

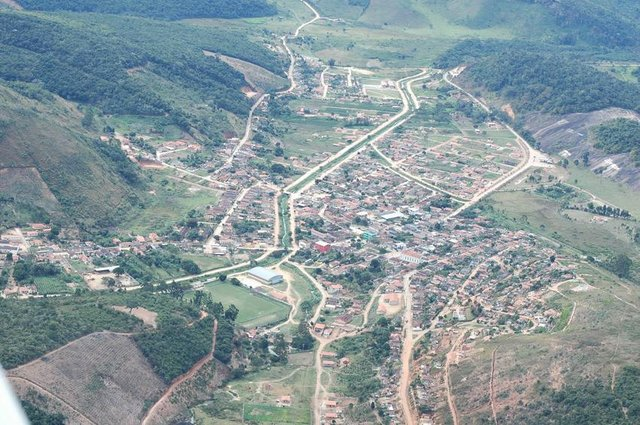
- View of Itaipé in the state of Minas Gerais

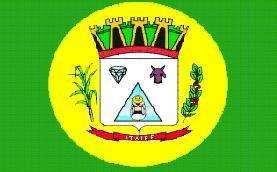
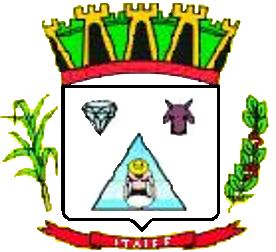
- Flag Coat of arms

- Location of Itaipé in Minas Gerais
- Country: Brazil
- Region: Southeast
- State: Minas Gerais
- Intermediate Geographic Region: Teófilo Otoni
- Immediate Geographic Region: Teófilo Otoni

Area
  - Total: 480,829 km^{2} (185,649 sq mi)
- Elevation: 847 m (2,779 ft)

Population (2022)
  - Total: 10,463
  - Density: 21.76/km^{2} (56.4/sq mi)
- Time zone: UTC−3 (BRT)
- Website: itaipe.mg.gov.br

Itaipé is a Brazilian municipality located in the northeast of the state of Minas Gerais. Its population as of 2020 was estimated to be 12,836 people living in a total area of 483 km^{2}. The city is part of the Immediate Geographic Region of Teófilo Otoni. It became a municipality in 1962.

== Geography ==
Itaipé is located on at an elevation of 847 meters, 66 km. northwest of Teófilo Otoni. The distance to the state capital, Belo Horizonte, is 530 km. Neighboring municipalities are: Novo Cruzeiro, Caraí, Catuji, and Ladainha.

The city's name is of Tupi origin and means "Path of Stones", due to the presence in the region of many interesting rock formations. The most spectacular is Pedra do Chifre, with an elevation of 1,100 meters, and located on the municipal boundary of Itaipé and Teófilo Otoni. There are also many waterfalls in the region including Cachoeira das Bicas, 3 km. from the city center.

The town began as a district of Araçuai and later Novo Cruzeiro, becoming a municipality in 1962.

== Economy ==
The main economic activities are services, small industries, and agriculture. The GDP in 2005 was R$37 million (US$15.2 million), with 20 million from services, 3 million from industry, and 12 million from agriculture. There were 1,232 rural producers on 38,000 hectares of land. Only 16 farms had tractors (2006). Approximately 4,100 persons were dependent on agriculture. The main crops were coffee, sugarcane, beans and corn. There were 6,000 head of cattle (2006). There was one bank (2007) and 347 automobiles (556 motorcycles), giving a ratio of 33 inhabitants per automobile.

== Health and education ==
There were 2 health clinic and 1 hospital with 26 beds (2005). Patients with more serious health conditions are transported to Teófilo Otoni. Educational needs were met by 22 primary schools, 1 middle school, and 1 pre-primary school.

== Social indicators ==
- Municipal Human Development Index: 0.633 (2000)
- State ranking: 786 out of 853 municipalities as of 2000
- National ranking: 4,071 out of 5,138 municipalities as of 2000
- Literacy rate: 63%
- Life expectancy: 67 (average of males and females)

In 2000 the per capita monthly income of R$100 (US$54.66) was well below the state and national average of R$276.00 and R$297.00 respectively.

In terms of HDI, the highest ranking municipality in Minas Gerais in 2000 was Poços de Caldas with 0.841, while the lowest was Setubinha with 0.568. Nationally the highest was São Caetano do Sul in São Paulo with 0.919, while the lowest was Setubinha. In more recent statistics (considering 5,507 municipalities) Manari in the state of Pernambuco has the lowest rating in the country—0,467—putting it in last place.

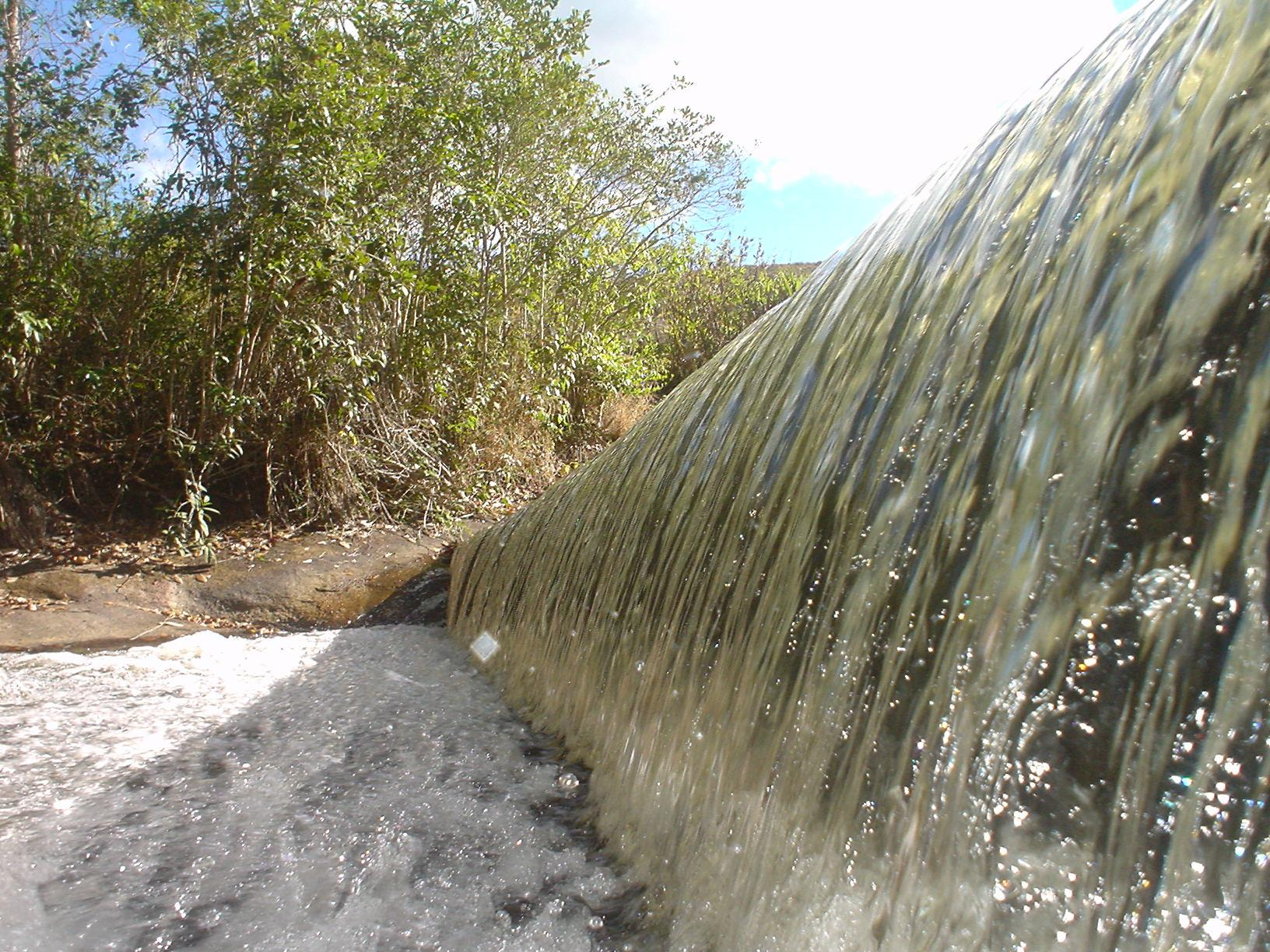
Photo of Bicas Waterfall

- Percentage of population aged less than five years old: 13.02 (2000)
- Percentage of population aged 10 to 19: 25.92
- Percentage of population aged 60 or more: 8.36
- Percentage of urbanization: 37.94
- Percentage of urban residences connected to sewage system: 83.40
- Infant mortality rate: 21.46 (in 1,000 live births)

== See also ==
- List of municipalities in Minas Gerais
