= Ataléia =

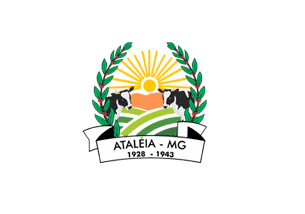
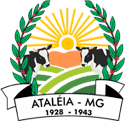
- Flag Coat of arms

- Coordinates: 18°02′38″S 41°06′36″W
- Country: Brazil
- Region: Southeast
- State: Minas Gerais
- Intermediate Geographic Region: Teófilo Otoni
- Immediate Geographic Region: Teófilo Otoni

Area
  - Total: 1,838.384 km^{2} (709.804 sq mi)
- Elevation: 240 m (790 ft)

Population (2020)
  - Total: 12,678
  - Density: 8.2/km^{2} (21/sq mi)
- Time zone: UTC−3 (BRT)
- Website: ataleia.mg.gov.br

Ataléia is a municipality located in the northeast of Minas Gerais in Brazil. Its population as of 2020 was estimated to be 12,678 people living in a total area of 1,838.384 km^{2}. The city is part of the Immediate Geographic Region of Teófilo Otoni. It became a municipality in 1943.

== Geography ==
Ataléia is located at an elevation of 240 meters, 70 km. east of Teófilo Otoni and a short distance from the boundary with the state of Espírito Santo. The distance to the state capital, Belo Horizonte, is 516 km. Neighboring municipalities are: Teófilo Otoni, Carlos Chagas, the state of Espírito Santo, Frei Gaspar and Ouro Verde de Minas.

== Economy ==
The main economic activities are services, small industries, and agriculture. The GDP in 2005 was R$53 million (US$21.77 million), with 34 million reais from services, 7 million reais from industry, and 3 million reais from agriculture. There were 1,211 rural producers on 102,000 hectares of land. Only 52 farms had tractors in 2006. Approximately 3,200 persons were dependent on agriculture. The main crops were bananas, coffee, sugarcane, beans and corn. There were 111,000 head of cattle in 2006. There were 2 banks: Bradesco and Sicoob in 2007 and 438 automobiles (361 motorcycles), giving a ratio of 3,400 inhabitants per automobile.

== Health and education ==
There were 5 health clinics and 1 hospital with 12 beds. Patients with more serious health conditions are transported to Teófilo Otoni. Educational needs were met by 16 primary schools, 2 middle schools, and 7 pre-primary schools.

== Social indicators ==
- Municipal Human Development Index: 0.653 (2000)
- State ranking: 736 out of 853 municipalities as of 2000
- National ranking: 3,727 out of 5,138 municipalities as of 2000
- Literacy rate: 67%
- Life expectancy: 65 (average of males and females)

In 2000 the per capita income of R$111 (US$60.67) was well below the state average of R$276 (US$150.87).

The highest ranking municipality in Minas Gerais in terms of Human Development Index in 2000 was Poços de Caldas with 0.841, while the lowest was Setubinha with 0.568. Nationally the highest was São Caetano do Sul in São Paulo with 0.919, while the lowest was Manari in Pernambuco with 0.467.

- Percentage of population aged less than 5 years old: 9.83 (2000)
- Percentage of population aged 10 to 19: 25.06.
- Percentage of population aged 60 or more: 25.80
- Percentage of urbanization: 45.15
- Percentage of urban residences connected to sewage system: 57.40
- Infant mortality rate: 17.70 (in 1,000 live births)

== See also ==
- List of municipalities in Minas Gerais
