= Ouro Verde de Minas =

Brazilian municipality located in the northeast of the state of Minas Gerais

Coordinates: 18°04′15″S 41°16′12″W

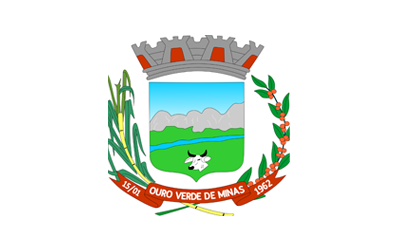
- Flag

- Location of Ouro Verde in Minas Gerais
- Country: Brazil
- Region: Southeast
- State: Minas Gerais
- Intermediate Geographic Region: Teófilo Otoni
- Immediate Geographic Region: Teófilo Otoni

Area
  - Total: 175.482 km^{2} (67.754 sq mi)
- Elevation: 549 m (1,801 ft)

Population (2022)
  - Total: 5,757
  - Density: 32.81/km^{2} (85.0/sq mi)
- Time zone: UTC−3 (BRT)
- Website: ouroverdedeminas.mg.gov.br

Ouro Verde de Minas is a Brazilian municipality located in the northeast of the state of Minas Gerais. Its population as of 2020 was estimated to be 5,914 people living in a total area of 174 km^{2}. The city belongs to the mesoregion of Vale do Mucuri and to the micro-region of Teófilo Otoni. It became a municipality in 1962.

== Geography ==
Ouro Verde de Minas is located at an elevation of 549 meters, 49 km. southeast of Teófilo Otoni. The distance to the state capital, Belo Horizonte, is 494 km. Neighboring municipalities are: Teófilo Otoni, Ataléia, and Frei Gaspar.

== Economy ==
The main economic activities are services, small industries, and agriculture. A large percentage of the population lives in the rural area and is engaged in subsistence farming. The GDP in 2005 was approximately R$17 million (US$6.98 million), with 10 million from services, 1 million from industry, and 5 million from agriculture. There were 605 rural producers on 12,000 hectares of land. Only five farms had tractors (2006). Approximately 1,700 persons were dependent on agriculture. The main cash crop was coffee while sugarcane, beans and corn were grown on a small scale. There were 16,000 head of cattle (2006). There was one bank (2007) and 192 automobiles (254 motorcycles), giving a ratio of 34 inhabitants per automobile.

== Health and education ==
There were three health clinics. Patients with more serious health conditions are transported to Teófilo Otoni. Educational needs were met by 20 primary schools, 1 middle school, and 1 pre-primary school.

- Municipal Human Development Index: 0.615 (2000)
- State ranking: 814 out of 853 municipalities as of 2000
- National ranking: 4,400 out of 5,138 municipalities as of 2000
- Literacy rate: 67%
- Life expectancy: 60 (average of males and females)

In 2000 the per capita monthly income of R$98 (US$53.57) was well below the state and national average of R$276.00 and R$297.00 respectively.

In terms of HDI, the highest ranking municipality in Minas Gerais in 2000 was Poços de Caldas with 0.841, while the lowest was Setubinha with 0.568. Nationally the highest was São Caetano do Sul in São Paulo with 0.919, while the lowest was Setubinha. In more recent statistics (considering 5,507 municipalities) Manari in the state of Pernambuco has the lowest rating in the country—0,467—putting it in last place.

- Percentage of population aged less than five years old: 10.61 (2000)
- Percentage of population aged 10 to 19: 25.05
- Percentage of population aged 60 or more: 11.96
- Percentage of urbanization: 55.84
- Percentage of urban residences connected to sewage system: 62.70
- Infant mortality rate: 8.47 (in 1,000 live births)

== See also ==
- List of municipalities in Minas Gerais
