= Itaobim =

Coordinates: 16°33′43″S 41°30′10″W

- Municipality
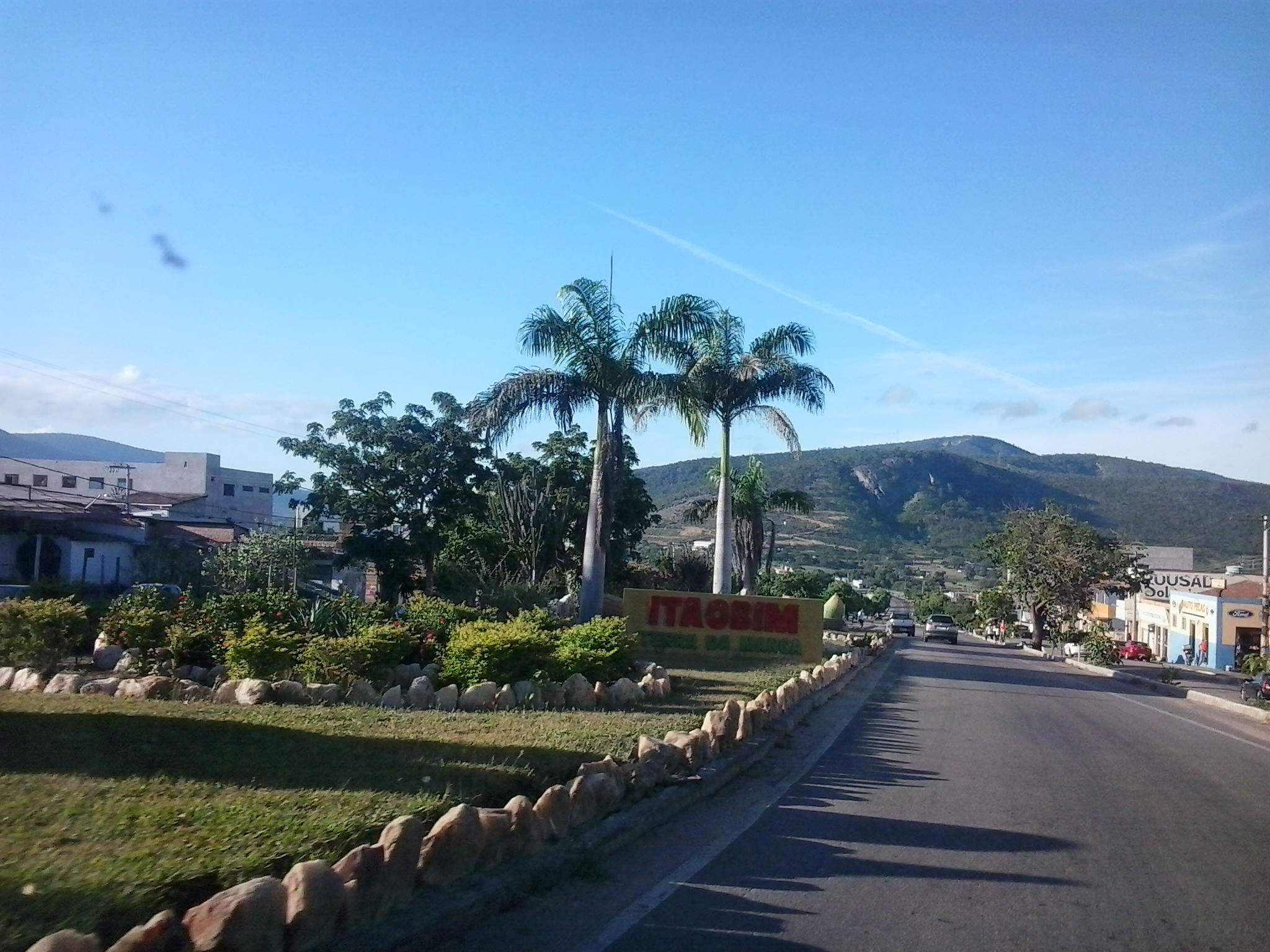
- BR-116 in the city

- Flag Coat of arms

- Country: Brazil
- State: Minas Gerais
- Intermediate Geographic Region: Teófilo Otoni
- Immediate Geographic Region: Teófilo Otoni
- Incorporated: 30 December 1962

Government
  - Mayor: Fabiano Fernandes Silva Ribeiro (DEM)

Area
  - Total: 679,024 km^{2} (262,173 sq mi)

Population (2020)
  - Total: 21,029
  - Density: 31.1/km^{2} (81/sq mi)
- Demonym: Itaobinhense
- Time zone: UTC−3 (BRT)
- Postal code: 39625-000
- Area code(s): +55 33
- Website: Itaobim, Minas Gerais

Itaobim is a municipality in the northeast of the Brazilian state of Minas Gerais. Its population in 2020 was 21,029 inhabitants in a total area of 680 km^{2} (260 sq mi). The city is part of the Immediate Geographic Region of Teófilo Otoni. The elevation of the municipal seat is 180 meters. It became a municipality in 1962. Neighboring municipalities are Medina, Jequitinhonha, Ponto dos Volantes and Itinga. The distance to the state capital, Belo Horizonte, is 604 kilometers.

== Etymology ==
The word Itaobim comes from the Tupi language and means Itá (rock) and oby (green). This toponym was chosen by the inhabitants because there is a mountain range made up of green-toned rocks near the city.

== History ==
In the 1910s, the town of São Roque existed, located between the Jequitinhonha River and the São Roque stream. The town was formed by people from the Brazilian northeast, mostly from Bahia, who were fleeing the drought. According to reports, the location was chosen because it had fertile and flat land, suitable for agriculture and livestock farming. After a flood that occurred in January 1928, when the Jequitinhonha River overflowed and destroyed the town, the inhabitants sought refuge on a nearby plateau, forming the city of Itaobim.

The municipality was officially formed on December 30, 1962.

== Geography ==
According to the regional division in force since 2017, instituted by the IBGE, the municipality belongs to the Intermediate and Immediate Geographic Region of Teófilo Otoni. Until then, with the divisions into microregions and mesoregions in force, it was part of the microregion of Pedra Azul, which in turn was included in the mesoregion of Jequitinhonha. Located 620 km from Belo Horizonte, the city, an old route of the bandeirantes, is at a strategic junction of the BR-116 (Rio-Bahia), BR-367 (North of Minas) and BR-327 (South of Bahia) highways.

== Economy ==
The city's GDP is around R$308.7 million reais, with 54.8% of the added value coming from services, followed by public administration (36.5%), industry (5.6%) and agriculture (3.1%). The GDP per capita of Itaobim is R$14.7 thousand.

== Culture ==
In the city, the Itaobim Art and Culture Museum has old objects and stuffed animals by Brasiliano Pereira Reis, better known as Mestre Canjira, a taxidermist who stuffed animals and birds killed in accidents donated by drivers and Forest Police officers. Every year, Itaobim holds the Festa da Manga, a festival that brings together many people from the region and where nationally famous artists perform.

== See also ==
- List of municipalities in Minas Gerais
