= Nova Módica =

- Municipality
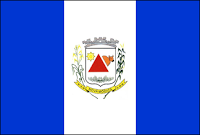
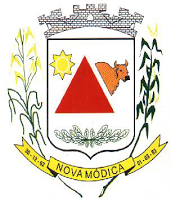
- Flag Coat of arms

- Location in Brazil Nova Módica (Brazil)
- Country: Brazil
- Region: Southeast
- State: Minas Gerais
- Intermediate Geographic Region: Teófilo Otoni
- Immediate Geographic Region: Teófilo Otoni

Population (2020)
  - Total: 3,573
- Time zone: UTC−3 (BRT)

Nova Módica is a municipality in the state of Minas Gerais in the Southeast region of Brazil.

== See also ==
- List of municipalities in Minas Gerais
