= Immediate Geographic Region of Teófilo Otoni =

Urban administrative region in Minas Gerais, Brazil

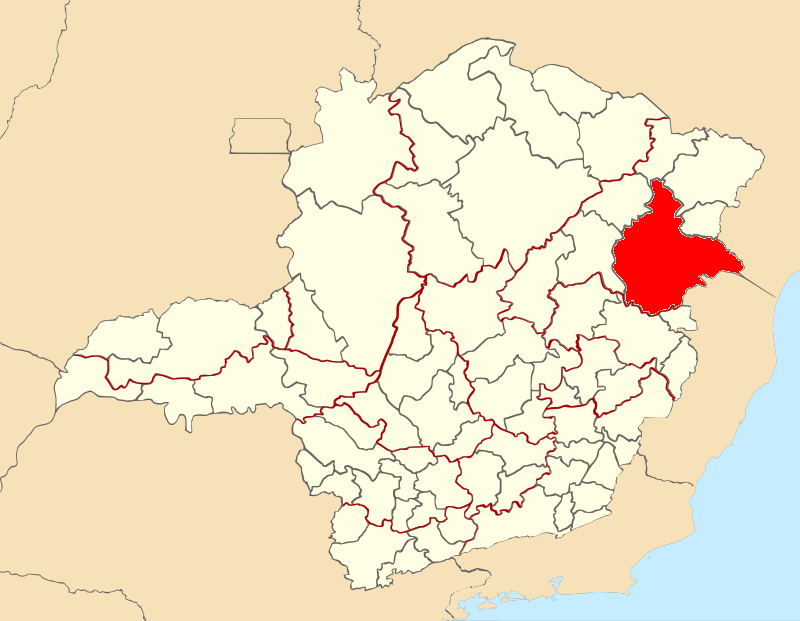
Immediate Geographic Region of Teófilo Otoni, in the state of Minas Gerais, Brazil.

The Immediate Geographic Region of Teófilo Otoni is one of the 7 immediate geographic regions in the Intermediate Geographic Region of Teófilo Otoni, one of the 70 immediate geographic regions in the Brazilian state of Minas Gerais and one of the 509 of Brazil, created by the National Institute of Geography and Statistics (IBGE) in 2017.

== Municipalities ==
It comprises 27 municipalities.

- Ataléia
- Campanário
- Caraí
- Carlos Chagas
- Catuji
- Franciscópolis
- Frei Gaspar
- Itaipé
- Itambacuri
- Itaobim
- Ladainha
- Malacacheta
- Monte Formoso
- Nanuque
- Nova Módica
- Novo Cruzeiro
- Novo Oriente de Minas
- Ouro Verde de Minas
- Padre Paraíso
- Pavão
- Pescador
- Ponto dos Volantes
- Poté
- São José do Divino
- Serra dos Aimorés
- Setubinha
- Teófilo Otoni

== See also ==
- List of Intermediate and Immediate Geographic Regions of Minas Gerais
