= São José do Divino, Minas Gerais =

Coordinates: 18°28′44″S 41°23′20″W

- Municipality
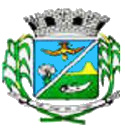
- Coat of arms
- Interactive map of São José do Divino, Minas Gerais
- Country: Brazil
- Region: Southeast
- State: Minas Gerais
- Intermediate Geographic Region: Teófilo Otoni
- Immediate Geographic Region: Teófilo Otoni

Population (2020)
  - Total: 3,856
- Time zone: UTC−3 (BRT)

São José do Divino, Minas Gerais is a municipality in the state of Minas Gerais in the Southeast region of Brazil.

== See also ==
- List of municipalities in Minas Gerais
