= Teófilo Otoni Airport =

Kemil Kumaira Airport Aeroporto Kemil Kumaira
- IATA: TFL; ICAO: SNTO; LID: MG0048

Summary
- Airport type: Public
- Serves: Teófilo Otoni
- Time zone: BRT (UTC−03:00)
- Elevation AMSL: 480 m (1,570 ft)
- Coordinates: 17°53′27″S 041°30′54″W

Map
- Location in Brazil TFL (Brazil)

Runways
Direction	Length		Surface
Direction	m	ft	Surface
11/29	1,190	3,904	Asphalt
- Sources: ANAC, DECEA

Kemil Kumaira Airport (IATA: TFL, ICAO: SNTO) is the airport serving Teófilo Otoni, Brazil. It is named after Kemil Said Kumaira (1940 - 2012), a lawyer and politician. Formerly the facility was named after Juscelino Kubitschek.

== History ==
The airport was opened in 1987.

== Airlines and destinations ==
Airlines	Destinations
Azul Conecta	Belo Horizonte

== Access ==
The airport is located 6 km (4 mi) from downtown Teófilo Otoni.

== See also ==
- List of airports in Brazil
