= Ponto dos Volantes =

Coordinates: 16°44′43″S 41°30′05″W

- Municipality
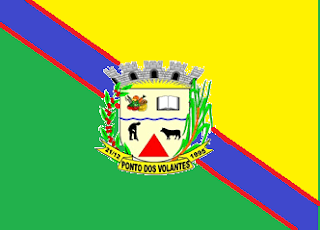
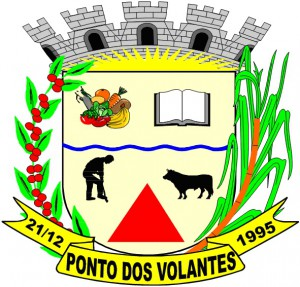
- Flag Coat of arms

- Country: Brazil
- State: Minas Gerais
- Intermediate Geographic Region: Teófilo Otoni
- Immediate Geographic Region: Teófilo Otoni
- Incorporated: 21 December 1995

Government
  - Mayor: Cândido Ferraz Alves (PSDB)

Area
  - Total: 1,212 km^{2} (468 sq mi)

Population (2022)
  - Total: 10,883
  - Density: 8.98/km^{2} (23.3/sq mi)
- Demonym: ponto-volantense
- Time zone: UTC−3 (BRT)
- Postal Code: 39615-000
- Area code(s): +55 33
- Website: Ponto dos Volantes, Minas Gerais

Ponto dos Volantes (Brazilian Portuguese pronunciation: [ˈpõtu duz voˈlɐ̃t͡ʃis]) is a Brazilian municipality located in the northeast of the state of Minas Gerais. The city is part of the Immediate Geographic Region of Teófilo Otoni. The population according to the 2022 census was 10,883 inhabitants in an area of 1,212.413 km² (approx. 468 sq mi). It became a municipality in 1995.

== History ==
In the early 20th century, the site of what is now Ponto dos Volantes was a small rural settlement known as Barra dos Pilões, named for its location at the confluence of several streams. The modern town, however, only began to form with the construction of the BR-116 highway in the 1940s. A small bar was opened at the construction site, which soon became a popular meeting point for workers, local farmers, and prostitutes. Once the highway was completed, some of the workers decided to settle there permanently, founding the town and giving it the new name "Ponto dos Volantes"—which literally translates to "Drivers' Stop" or "Point of the Drivers."

Ponto dos Volantes was established as a settlement of Itinga in 1943. It was later elevated to a district in 1985, and finally became an independent municipality in December 21, 1995.

== Geography ==
Ponto dos Volantes is located in the Jequitinhonha Valley. According to the 2017 regional division by the Brazilian Institute of Geography and Statistics (IBGE), the municipality is part of the Intermediate and Immediate Geographic Regions of Teófilo Otoni. Prior to this, under the previous microregion and mesoregion system, it belonged to the microregion of Araçuaí, which was itself part of the mesoregion of Jequitinhonha.

== Economy ==
The GDP of Ponto dos Volantes is approximately R$ 122.6 million, with public administration accounting for the largest share of value added at 52.4%. This is followed by the services sector (35%), agriculture and livestock (8.6%), and industry (4.1%). The GDP per capita in Ponto dos Volantes is R$ 10,000.

== Culture ==
Ponto dos Volantes is the municipality where Isabel Mendes da Cunha lived, a celebrated artisan renowned for her clay sculptures depicting women. Recognized as one of the most famous craftswomen in Minas Gerais, she became known as the "Dollmaker of the Jequitinhonha Valley." Each year, the district of Santana do Araçuaí hosts the Santana do Araçuaí Crafts Fair, considered the largest of its kind in the Jequitinhonha Valley. The fair serves as a vital platform, showcasing the work of local artisans and featuring performances by artists with national reputations.

== See also ==
- List of municipalities in Minas Gerais
