= Novo Oriente de Minas =

Municipality in the northeast of the Brazilian state of Minas Gerais

Coordinates: 17°24′57″S 41°12′55″W

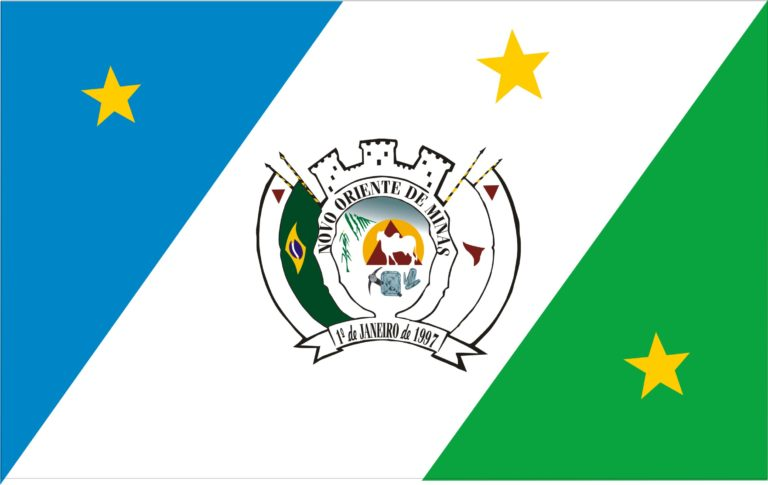
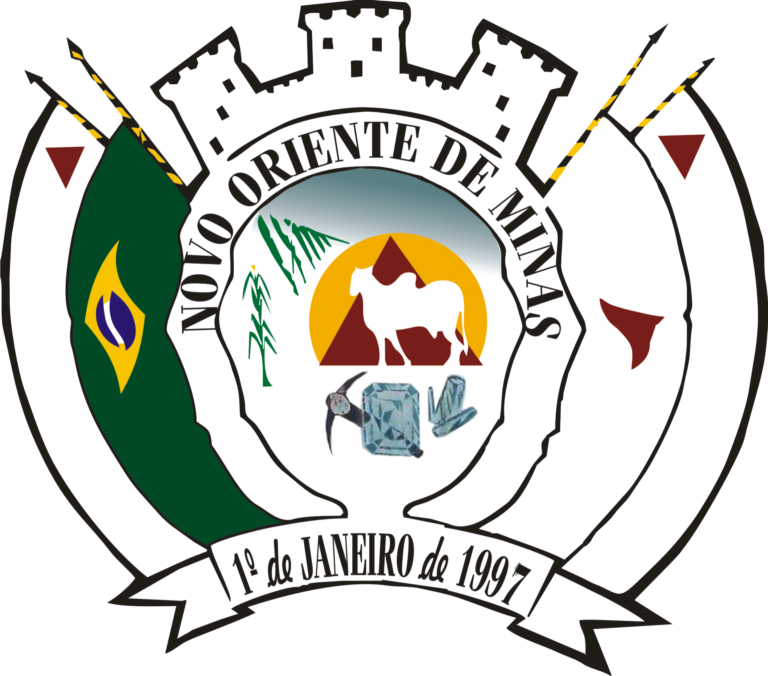
- Flag Coat of arms

- Location of Novo Oriente in Minas Gerais
- Country: Brazil
- Region: Southeast
- State: Minas Gerais
- Intermediate Geographic Region: Teófilo Otoni
- Immediate Geographic Region: Teófilo Otoni

Area
  - Total: 755.161 km^{2} (291.569 sq mi)
- Elevation: 400 m (1,300 ft)

Population (2022)
  - Total: 10,275
  - Density: 13.61/km^{2} (35.2/sq mi)
- Time zone: UTC−3 (BRT)
- Area code: 39817-000
- Website: novoorientedeminas.mg.gov.br

Novo Oriente de Minas is a municipality in the northeast of the Brazilian state of Minas Gerais. As of 2020 the population was 10,778 in a total area of 754 km^{2} (291 sq mi). The elevation is 400 metres (1,300 ft). It became a municipality in 1997.

== Geography ==
Novo Oriente de Minas is part of the statistical microregion of Teófilo Otoni. It is connected by poor roads to the regional center of Teófilo Otoni to the southwest 62 kilometres (39 mi) away.

== Economy ==
The city is one of the poorest municipalities in the state and in the country. The main economic activities are cattle raising (13,000 head in 2006) and farming with modest production of coffee, sugarcane, and bananas. In 2006 there were 300 rural producers with a total area of 32,413 hectares (80,090 acres). Cropland made up 1,000 hectares (2,500 acres). There were only five tractors. In the urban area there were no financial institutions as of 2006. There were 125 automobiles, giving a ratio of about one automobile for every 80 inhabitants. Health care was provided by four public health clinics. There were no hospitals.

== Municipal Human Development Index ==
- MHDI: .582 (2000)
- State ranking: 847 out of 853 municipalities
- National ranking: 4,942 out of 5,138 municipalities
- Life expectancy: 62
- Literacy rate: 57
- Combined primary, secondary and tertiary gross enrolment ratio: .696
- Per capita income (monthly): R$80.07

== See also ==
- List of municipalities in Minas Gerais
