= Crisólita =

Municipality in the northeast of the Brazilian state of Minas Gerais

Coordinates: 17°14′32″S 40°54′49″W

- Municipality
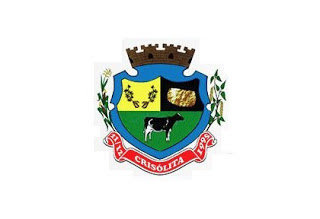
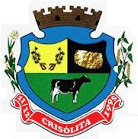
- Flag Coat of arms
- Interactive map of Crisólita
- Country: Brazil
- State: Minas Gerais
- Region: Southeast
- Time zone: UTC−3 (BRT)

Location of Crisólita in the state of Minas Gerais

Crisólita is a municipality in the northeast of the Brazilian state of Minas Gerais. As of 2020 the population was 6,760 in a total area of 970 km^{2} (370 sq mi). The elevation is 282 meters. It is part of the IBGE statistical microregion of Nanuque. The postal code (CEP) is 39885-000.

== Geography ==
Crisólita is on the Rio Pampa, a tributary of the Mucuri. The nearest regional center is Nanuque, which is more than 100 kilometers to the southeast on poor roads.

== Economy ==
The economy is based on cattle raising (62,889 head in 2006) and agriculture, with the main crops being sugarcane, beans, manioc, and corn. As of 2005 there were no hospitals and 4 public health clinics. In 2006 there were 10 primary schools and 1 middle schools. There were 73 automobiles in 2006, giving a ratio of 80 inhabitants per automobile.

== Municipal Human Development Index ==
Crisólita ranked very low on the MHDI and was one of the poorest municipalities in the state and in the country as of 2000.

- MHDI: .586 (2000)
- State ranking: 844 out of 853 municipalities
- National ranking: 4,894 out of 5,138 municipalities in 2000
- Life expectancy: 62
- Literacy rate: 58
- Combined primary, secondary and tertiary gross enrolment ratio: .674
- Per capita income (monthly): R$90.50 For the complete list see Frigoletto

The above figures can be compared with those of Poços de Caldas, which had an MHDI of .841, the highest in the state of Minas Gerais. The highest in the country was São Caetano do Sul in the state of São Paulo with an MHDI of .919. The lowest was Manari in the state of Pernambuco with an MHDI of .467 out of a total of 5504 municipalities in the country as of 2004. See Frigoletto

== See also ==
- List of municipalities in Minas Gerais
