= Pescador =

Coordinates: 18°22′S 41°36′W

- Municipality
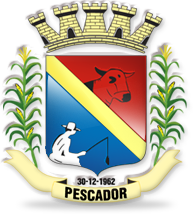
- Coat of arms
- Interactive map of Pescador
- Country: Brazil
- Region: Southeast
- State: Minas Gerais
- Intermediate Geographic Region: Teófilo Otoni
- Immediate Geographic Region: Teófilo Otoni

Population (2020)
  - Total: 4,256
- Time zone: UTC−3 (BRT)

Pescador is a municipality in the state of Minas Gerais in the Southeast region of Brazil.

== See also ==
- List of municipalities in Minas Gerais
