= Félix Guisard =

Brazilian businessman

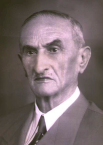
Felix Guisard picture

Félix Guisard (1862–1942) was a Brazilian businessman.
