= Jampruca =

Coordinates: 18°27′S 41°48′W

- Municipality
- Interactive map of Jampruca
- Country: Brazil
- Region: Southeast
- State: Minas Gerais
- Mesoregion: Vale do Rio Doce

Population (2022 Census)
  - Total: 4,296
  - Estimate (2025): 4,266
- Time zone: UTC−3 (BRT)

Jampruca is a municipality in the state of Minas Gerais in the Southeast region of Brazil.

== See also ==
- List of municipalities in Minas Gerais
