= Teófilo Otoni =

Municipality in Minas Gerais, Brazil

- Municipality
- Municipality of Teófilo Otoni
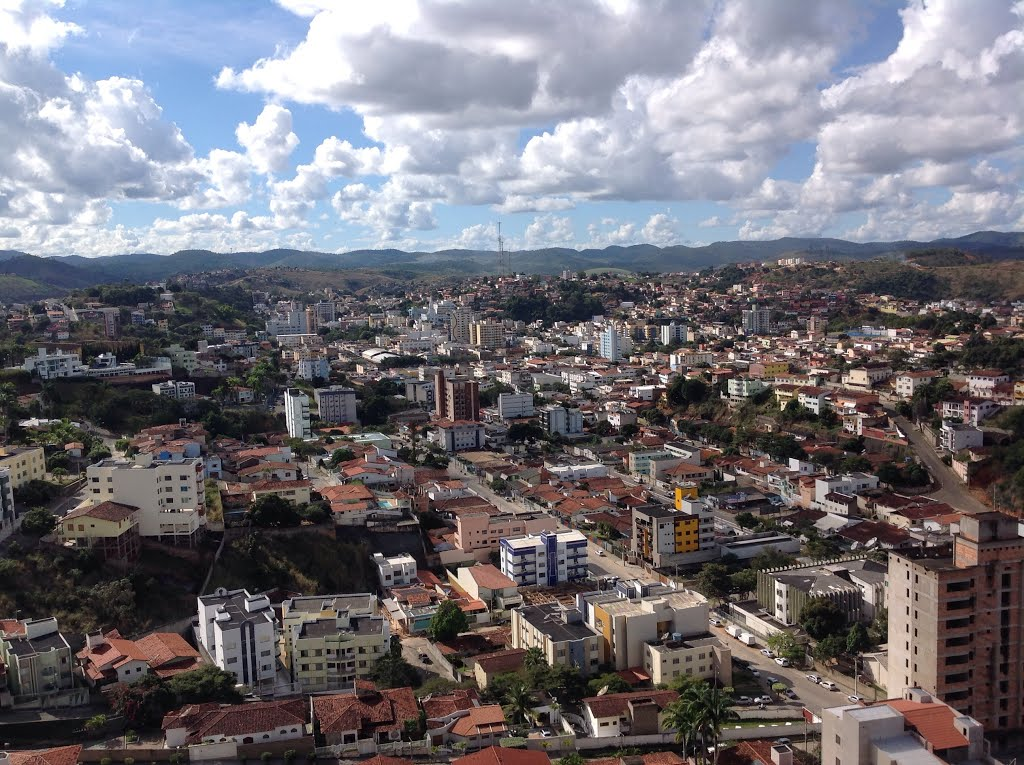
- Panoramic view of Teófilo Otoni

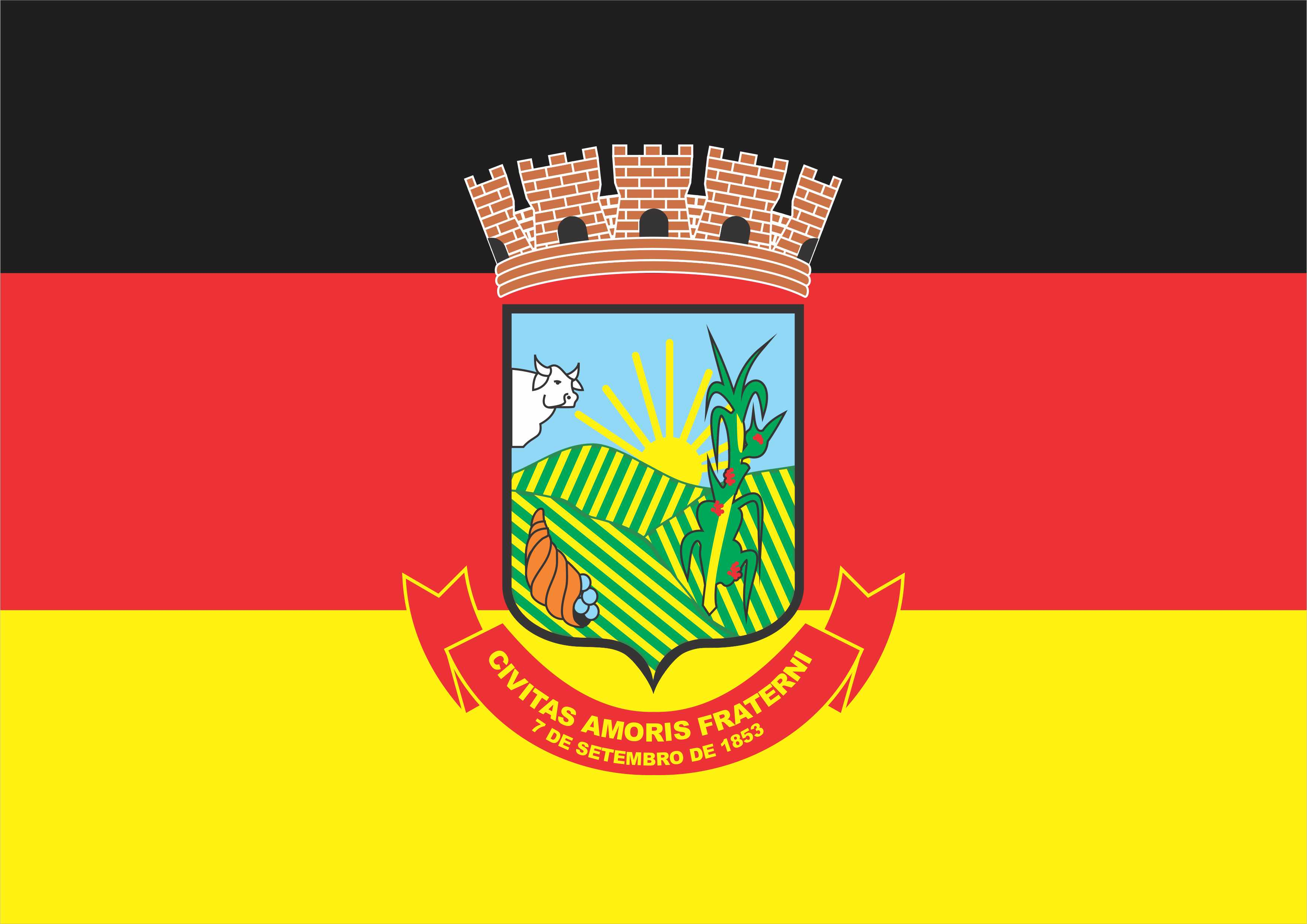
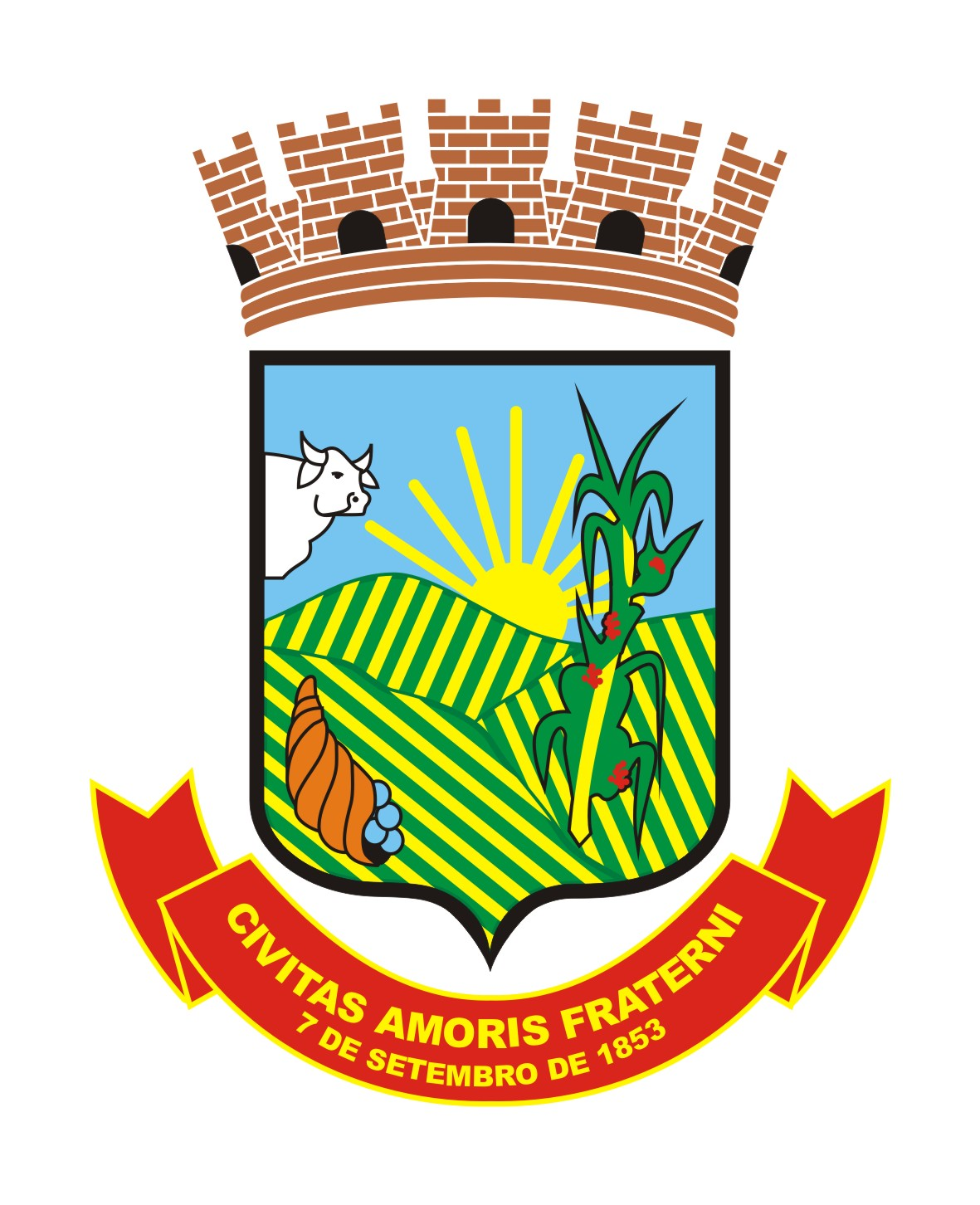
- Flag Coat of arms

- Location in Minas Gerais

- Location in Minas Gerais Location in Brazil
- Coordinates: 17°51′28″S 41°30′18″W
- Country: Brazil
- Region: Southeast
- State: Minas Gerais
- Intermediate region: Teófilo Otoni
- Immediate region: Teófilo Otoni
- Founded: September 7, 1853
- Municipality created: November 9, 1878
- Municipality installed: March 25, 1881
- Districts: Teófilo Otoni (seat), Crispim Jaques, Mucuri, Pedro Versiani, Rio Pretinho, and Topázio

Government
  - Mayor: Fábio Marinho dos Santos (PL)
  - Term: 2025–2028

Area
  - Total: 3,242.270 km^{2} (1,251.847 sq mi)
- Elevation: 334 m (1,096 ft)

Population (2022 census)
  - Total: 137,418
  - Estimate (2025): 142,851
  - Density: 42.3833/km^{2} (109.772/sq mi)
- Demonym: teófilo-otonense
- Time zone: UTC−3 (BRT)
- Postal code: 39800-000
- Area code: 33
- HDI (2010): 0.701 (high)
- GDP per capita (2023): R$25,762.62
- Website: teofilootoni.mg.gov.br

Teófilo Otoni is a municipality in northeastern Minas Gerais, Brazil, in the Mucuri River valley. It had a population of 137,418 in the 2022 census, with an estimated population of 142,851 in 2025, in an area of 3,242.270 km^{2} (1,251.847 sq mi). It is the seat of the Immediate Geographic Region of Teófilo Otoni and the Intermediate Geographic Region of Teófilo Otoni.

The settlement was founded as Filadélfia by Teófilo Ottoni on September 7, 1853. It became a municipality under the name Teófilo Otoni in 1878 and was formally installed in 1881.

== Origin of the name ==
The city is named after Teófilo Benedito Ottoni (Vila do Príncipe, 27 January 1807 - Rio de Janeiro, 17 October 1869), who was a provincial deputy representing Minas Gerais; a national deputy and a senator in the Empire of Brazil from 1864 to 1869; and founder of the city of the same name.

== Geography ==
It lies at an elevation of 319 meters on the Todos os Santos River, a tributary of the Mucuri. It is part of the Valley of the Mucuri, a region which includes 27 municipalities. Situated on the Rio-Bahia Interstate Highway BR 116, it is 130 km. north of the regional center, Governador Valadares, on the Doce River, and 478 km north of the state capital, Belo Horizonte. It was founded in 1853 by German colonists and given city status in 1878.

Municipal boundaries are with:

- North: Novo Oriente de Minas and Itaipé
- South: Ouro Verde de Minas, Ataléia, Frei Gaspar and Itambacuri
- East: Pavão and Carlos Chagas
- West: Poté and Ladainha

Distances to important cities:

- Belo Horizonte: 450 km
- Brasília: 1,162 km
- Rio de Janeiro: 730 km
- Salvador: 900 km
- São Paulo: 1,050 km
- Vitória: 550 km

=== Statistical region ===
According to the modern (2017) geographic classification by Brazil's National Institute of Geography and Statistics (IBGE1), the city is the main municipality in the Intermediate Geographic Region of Teófilo Otoni.

Until 2017, Teófilo Otoni used to be a statistical microregion including the following municipalities: Ataléia, Catuji, Franciscópolis, Frei Gaspar, Itaipé, Ladainha, Malacacheta, Novo Oriente de Minas, Ouro Verde de Minas, Pavão, Poté, Setubinha, and Teófilo Otoni. The population of this region was 253,679 in 2000 and the area was 11,296.80 km^{2} (roughly the size of The Gambia and a little larger than Jamaica. The population density was 22.46 inhabitants/km^{2}.

=== Economy ===
Teófilo Otoni is a trade centre for an agricultural hinterland in which livestock raising is of some importance. The city has small-scale manufacturing and food-processing plants. Poor soils for agriculture and lack of industry have made Teófilo Otoni a major source of immigration to other regions of Brazil. In 2005 the GDP was R$723 million, of which 515 million was from services, 101 was from industry, and 37 million was from agriculture. Industry employed about 2,000 workers, services employed 8,800 workers, and public administration employed 2,300 workers.

Téofilo Otoni's strongest economic sector is a diverse and bustling service industry. The city has several commercial areas and a shopping mall, City Mall. Prominent businesses in Teófilo Otoni include Pharmacy Indiana, Stationery Graffite, the store Magda Magazin, and Ramos Transport. The trade in precious stones is also quite important as the city is considered an International Capital of Precious Stones, which comprises a good portion of its economy.

In October 1994, government of Brazil created an Export Processing Zone of 14.31 hectares in Teófilo Otoni, attracting several industries since then.

The city was granted the FIPP (International Fair of Precious Stones) recognized worldwide.

The city is served by Kemil Kumaira Airport.

=== Agricultural Data ===
- Cattle herd: 177,000 (2006)
- Rural producers: 2,422
- Agricultural area: 337,062 hectares
- Planted area: 13,200 ha.
- Natural pasture land: 125,506 ha.
- Persons working in agriculture: 7,000
- Tractors: 149
- Main crops: bananas, coffee, oranges, tangerines, and sugarcane

=== Mining ===
Extensive mining and gem trading for aquamarines, topaz, brazilianite, and various forms of quartz take place there. A Gem and Mineral Show (Feira Internacional de Pedras Preciosas (FIPP), is held here every year, attracting international buyers. The fair provides the opportunity to buy both rough and cut stones directly from local producers, miners and cutters.

=== Climate ===
Climate data for Teófilo Otoni (1981–2010)
Month	Jan	Feb	Mar	Apr	May	Jun	Jul	Aug	Sep	Oct	Nov	Dec	Year
Mean daily maximum °C (°F)	32.5 (90.5)	33.3 (91.9)	32.2 (90.0)	30.9 (87.6)	29.1 (84.4)	27.9 (82.2)	27.6 (81.7)	28.6 (83.5)	29.5 (85.1)	31.2 (88.2)	30.4 (86.7)	31.4 (88.5)	30.4 (86.7)
Daily mean °C (°F)	26.0 (78.8)	26.4 (79.5)	25.7 (78.3)	24.5 (76.1)	22.4 (72.3)	20.8 (69.4)	20.4 (68.7)	21.4 (70.5)	22.9 (73.2)	24.6 (76.3)	24.7 (76.5)	25.4 (77.7)	23.8 (74.8)
Mean daily minimum °C (°F)	21.3 (70.3)	21.4 (70.5)	21.2 (70.2)	20.1 (68.2)	17.8 (64.0)	16.1 (61.0)	15.6 (60.1)	16.3 (61.3)	18.1 (64.6)	19.6 (67.3)	20.4 (68.7)	21.1 (70.0)	19.1 (66.4)
Average precipitation mm (inches)	127.8 (5.03)	99.5 (3.92)	153.3 (6.04)	78.8 (3.10)	30.4 (1.20)	18.6 (0.73)	25.9 (1.02)	20.3 (0.80)	34.6 (1.36)	72.9 (2.87)	188.7 (7.43)	213.7 (8.41)	1,064.5 (41.91)
Average precipitation days (≥ 1.0 mm)	10	8	12	7	5	4	5	4	5	7	12	14	93
Average relative humidity (%)	71.9	70.2	73.6	75.0	76.6	75.6	74.4	70.2	68.5	67.8	74.0	74.4	72.7
Mean monthly sunshine hours	197.7	199.0	189.2	176.8	167.6	161.3	168.0	180.3	152.6	170.3	138.9	159.8	2,061.5
Source: Instituto Nacional de Meteorologia

== Health and education ==
The population was served by 61 health clinics and 4 hospitals (417 beds in 2005). There were several institutes of higher education: Faculdade de Tecnologia Egídio José da Silva (private), Instituto de Ensino Superior Integrado (private), Instituto de Educação Superior São Francisco de Assis de Teófilo Otoni (private philanthropic), Faculdades Unificadas Doctum de Teófilo Ottoni (private), a campus of the Federal University of Vales do Jequitinhonha and Mucuri - UFVJM (public) and a campus of the Federal Institute of Northern Minas Gerais - IFNMG (public).

Municipal Human Development Index

- MHDI: .742 (2000)
- State ranking: 343 out of 853 municipalities
- National ranking: 2,097 out of 5,138 municipalities
- Life expectancy: 69
- Literacy rate: 81

== Notable people ==
- Fred, footballer
- Félix Guisard, businessman
- Laso Schaller, extreme athlete in high diving
- Bruno Barros di Pietro, footballer
- Fahel, footballer
- Lobão, footballer
- Tristão Ferreira da Cunha, politician

== See also ==
- List of municipalities in Minas Gerais
- Roman Catholic Diocese of Teófilo Otoni
- 1985 hailstorm in eastern Minas Gerais
- Minas Gerais road crash
