= Itambacuri =

- Municipality
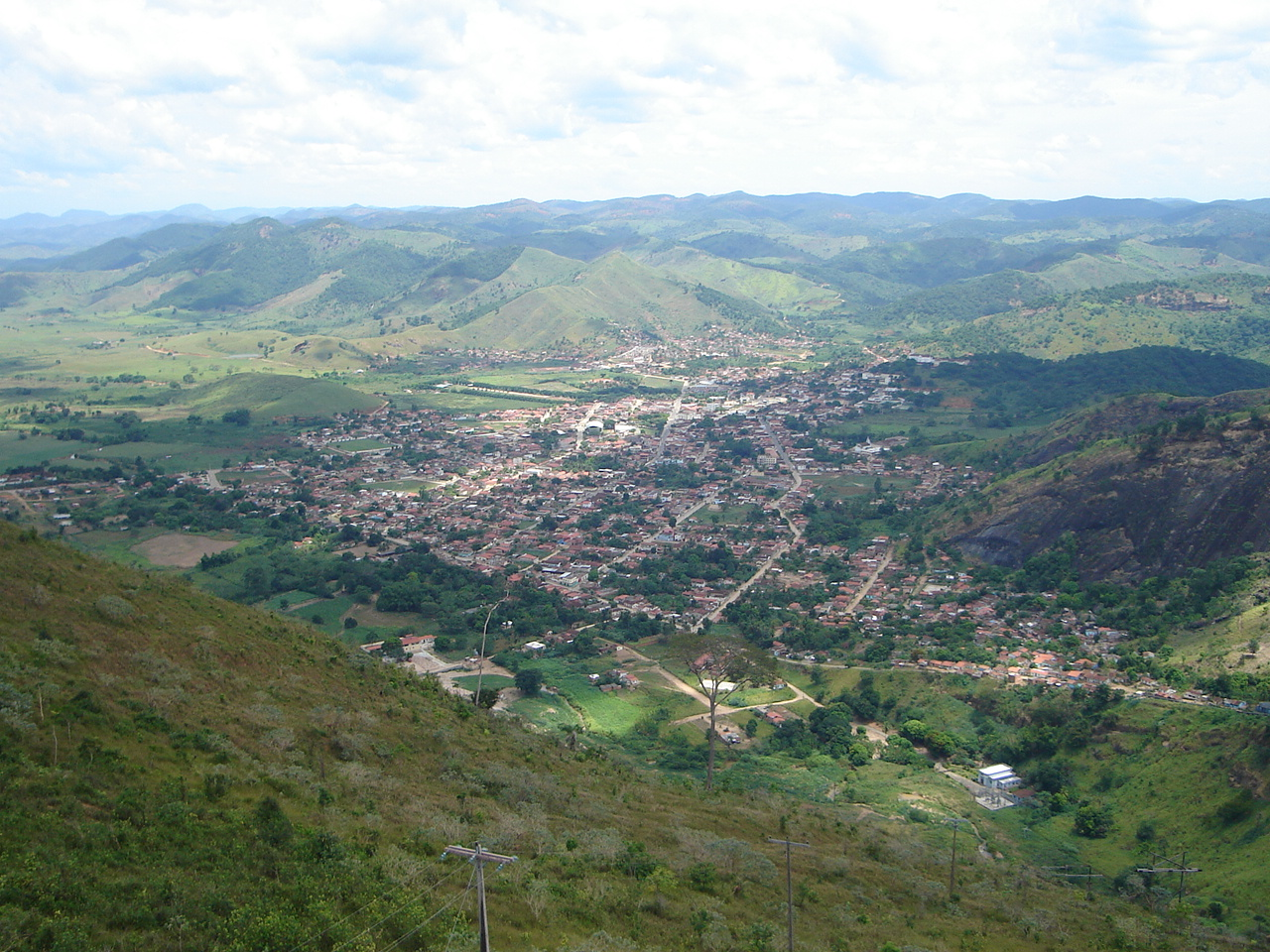

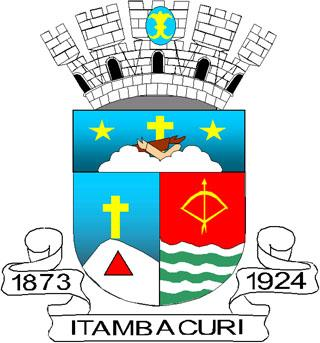
- Coat of arms

- Location in Minas Gerais state

- Location in Brazil
- Coordinates: 18°01′S 41°42′W
- Country: Brazil
- Region: Southeast
- State: Minas Gerais
- Intermediate Geographic Region: Teófilo Otoni
- Immediate Geographic Region: Teófilo Otoni

Population (2020)
  - Total: 23,209
- Time zone: UTC−3 (BRT)

Itambacuri (Brazilian Portuguese pronunciation: [itɐ̃bakuˈɾi]) is a Brazilian municipality located in the state of Minas Gerais. As of 2020 its population is estimated to be 23,209. Itambacuri contains its own airport.

== Notable people ==
- Camila Alves (born 1983), model, designer, and wife of actor Matthew McConaughey
- Paulão (born 1968), football player, Copa do Brasil winner

== See also ==
- List of municipalities in Minas Gerais
