= Setubinha =

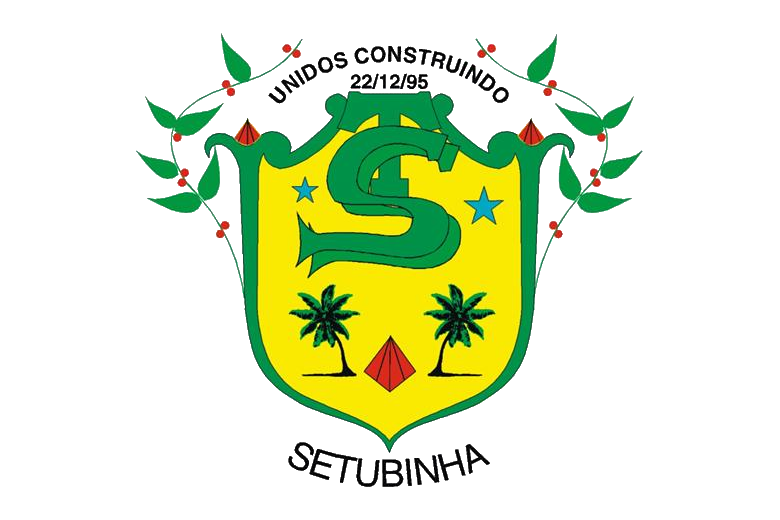
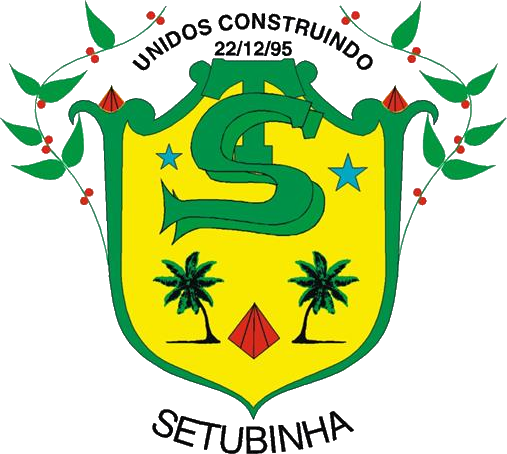
- Flag Coat of arms

- Location in Minas Gerais

- Location in Brazil
- Coordinates: 17°36′00″S 42°09′32″W
- Country: Brazil
- Region: Southeast
- State: Minas Gerais
- Intermediate Geographic Region: Teófilo Otoni
- Immediate Geographic Region: Teófilo Otoni
- Incorporated (municipality): December 22, 1995

Government
  - Mayor: Warlem Antônio José Barbosa

Area
  - Total: 534.655 km^{2} (206.431 sq mi)
- Elevation: 750 m (2,460 ft)

Population (2020)
  - Total: 12,378
- Time zone: UTC−3 (BRT)
- HDI (2010): 0.542
- Website: setubinha.mg.gov.br

Setubinha is a municipality in the northeast of the Brazilian state of Minas Gerais. As of 2020 the population was 12,378 in a total area of 536 km^{2} (207 sq mi). The elevation is 729 metres. It is part of the Immediate Geographic Region of Teófilo Otoni.

The economy is based on cattle raising and agriculture, with the main crops being coffee, bananas, sugarcane, and corn. As of 2005 there were no hospitals and 3 public health clinics. In 2006 there were 14 primary schools and 2 middle schools.

== See also ==
- List of municipalities in Minas Gerais
