= Manari, Pernambuco =

Municipality of Pernambuco, Brazil

Manari
- City
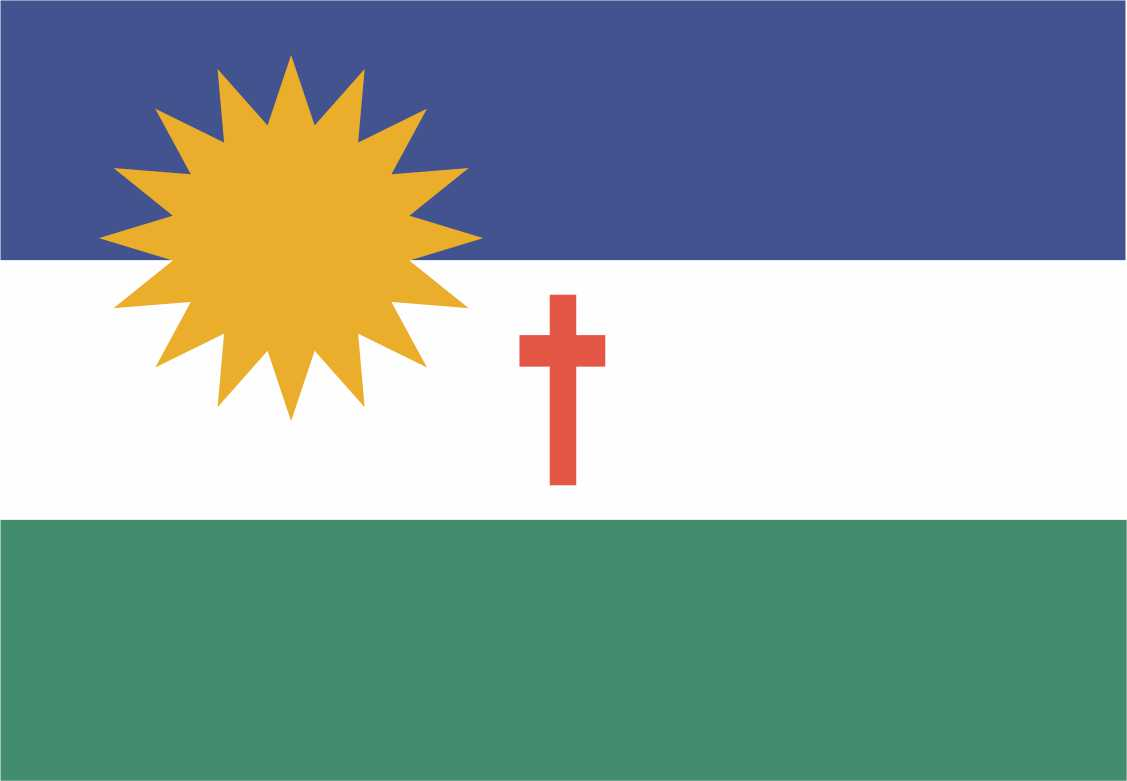
- Flag

- Manari located in Brazil map
- Coordinates: 8°57′50″S 37°37′40″W
- Country: Brazil
- State: Pernambuco
- Region: Sertão
- City: 1997

Area
  - Total: 406.64 km^{2} (157.00 sq mi)
- Elevation: 570 m (1,870 ft)

Population (2022 Census)
  - Total: 23,763
  - Estimate (2025): 27,046
- Time zone: UTC−3 (BRT)
- Average Temperature: 23.5 °C (74.3 °F)

Manari (Central northeastern portuguese pronunciation: [mɐ̃nɐˈɾi]) is a city established in 1997 in the state of Pernambuco, Brazil. The estimate population in 2025, according to the Brazilian Institute of Geography and Statistics, was 27,046 and the area is 386.57 km^{2} (149.26 sq mi). In 2000, Manari had the lowest HDI of any municipality in the state.

== Geography ==
- State - Pernambuco
- Region - Sertão Pernambucano
- Boundaries - Ibimirim (N); Alagoas state (S); Itaíba (E); Inajá (W)
- Area - 406.64 km^{2} (157.00 sq mi)
- Elevation - 570 m
- Hydrography - Moxotó River and Ipanema River
- Vegetation - Caatinga Hiperxerófila
- Climate - semi-arid, hot and dry
- Annual average temperature - 23.5 c
- Distance to Recife - 376 km

== Economy ==
The main economic activities in Manari are based in agribusiness, especially the raising of sheep, goats, cattle, and plantations of corn, beans and manioc.

=== Economic indicators ===
Population	GDP x(1000 R$).	GDP pc (R$)	PE
18.093	42.017	2.540	0.06%

Economy by sector (2006)

Primary sector	Secondary sector	Service sector
20.09%	6.64%	73.27%

=== Health indicators ===
HDI (2000)	Hospitals (2007)	Hospitals beds (2007)	Children's mortality every 1000 (2005)
0.467	1	13	58.8

== See also ==
- List of municipalities in Pernambuco
