= Intermediate Geographic Region of Teófilo Otoni =

Interurban administrative region in Minas Gerais, Brazil

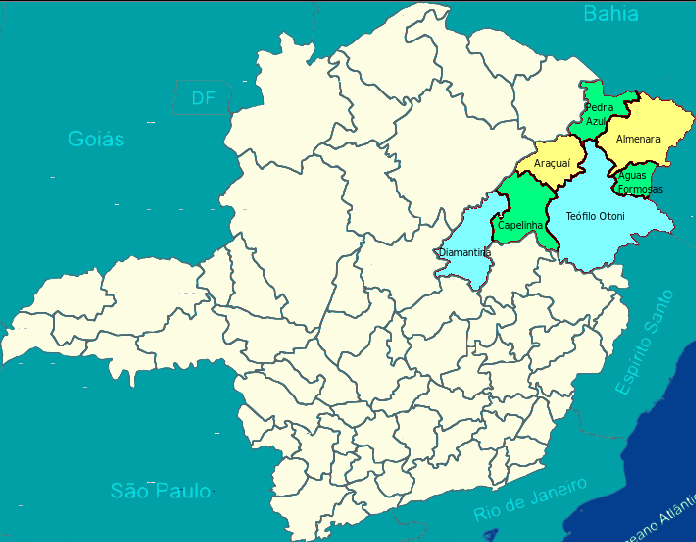
The Intermediate Geographic Region of Teófilo Otoni, in the state of Minas Gerais, Brazil.

The Intermediate Geographic Region of Teófilo Otoni (code 3103) is one of the 13 intermediate geographic regions in the Brazilian state of Minas Gerais and one of the 134 of Brazil, created by the National Institute of Geography and Statistics (IBGE) in 2017.

It comprises 86 municipalities, distributed in 7 immediate geographic regions:

- Immediate Geographic Region of Teófilo Otoni.
- Immediate Geographic Region of Capelinha.
- Immediate Geographic Region of Almenara.
- Immediate Geographic Region of Diamantina.
- Immediate Geographic Region of Araçuaí.
- Immediate Geographic Region of Pedra Azul.
- Immediate Geographic Region of Águas Formosas.

== See also ==
- List of Intermediate and Immediate Geographic Regions of Minas Gerais
