= José Gonçalves de Minas =

Municipality of Brazil

Coordinates: 16°54′25″S 42°36′13″W

- Municipality
- Interactive map of José Gonçalves de Minas
- Country: Brazil
- State: Minas Gerais
- Region: Southeast
- Time zone: UTC−3 (BRT)

Location of José Gonçalves de Minas in the state of Minas Gerais

José Gonçalves de Minas (Portuguese pronunciation: [ʒoˈzɛ ɡõˈsawviz dʒi ˈminɐs]) is a municipality in the northeast of the Brazilian state of Minas Gerais. As of 2020 the population was 4,487 in a total area of 382 km^{2} (147 sq mi). The elevation of the town center is 546 meters. It is part of the IBGE statistical meso-region of Jequitinhonha and the micro-region of Capelinha. It became a municipality in 1997.

The economy is based on charcoal production, cattle raising and subsistence agriculture, with the main crops being beans, manioc, sugarcane, and corn. There are extensive plantations of eucalyptus trees for charcoal production. In 2005 there were 254 rural producers but only 8 tractors. As of 2005 there were 3 public health clinics, none of which were equipped for diagnosis or general treatment. Educational needs were met by 6 primary schools and 1 middle school. There were 92 automobiles in 2006, giving a ratio of 50 inhabitants per automobile (there were 366 motorcycles). There were no banks in 2007.

Neighboring municipalities are: Cristália, Grão Mogol, Virgem da Lapa, Berilo, Francisco Badaró, Chapada do Norte, Leme do Prado, and Botumirim. The distance to Belo Horizonte is 529 km.

== Social indicators ==
José Gonçalves de Minas is ranked low on the MHDI and was one of the poorest municipalities in the state and in the country in 2000.

- MHDI: .646 (2000)
- State ranking: 758 out of 853 municipalities
- National ranking: 3,835 out of 5,138 municipalities in 2000
- Life expectancy: 66
- Literacy rate: 70
- Combined primary, secondary and tertiary gross enrolment ratio: .728
- Per capita income (monthly): R$95.00

The above figures can be compared with those of Poços de Caldas, which had an MHDI of .841, the highest in the state of Minas Gerais. The highest in the country was São Caetano do Sul in the state of São Paulo with an MHDI of .919. The lowest was Manari in the state of Pernambuco with an MHDI of .467 out of a total of 5504 municipalities in the country as of 2004. At last count Brazil had 5,561 municipalities so this might have changed at the time of this writing.

== See also ==
- List of municipalities in Minas Gerais
