= Turmalina, Minas Gerais =

Turmalina (Minas Gerais)
- Municipality
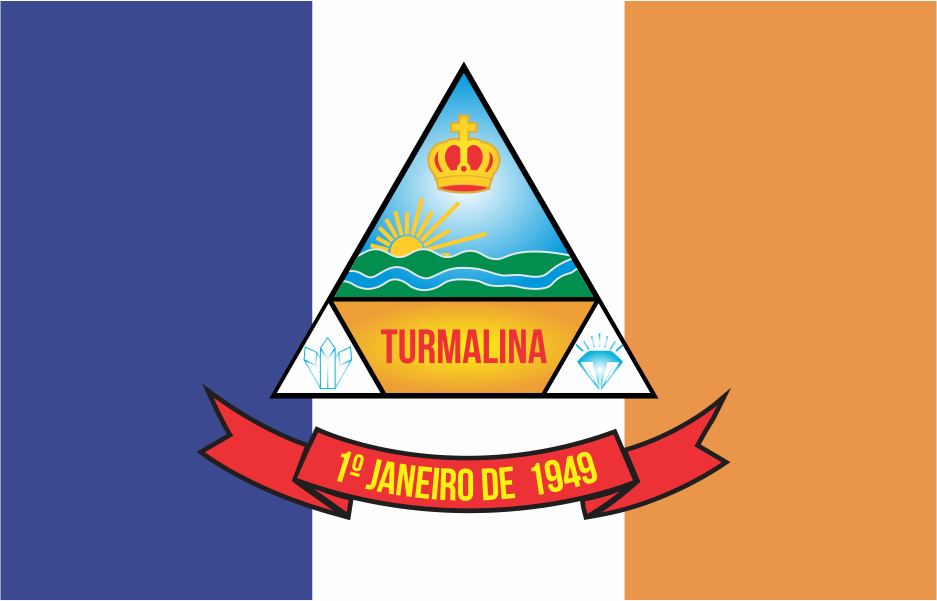
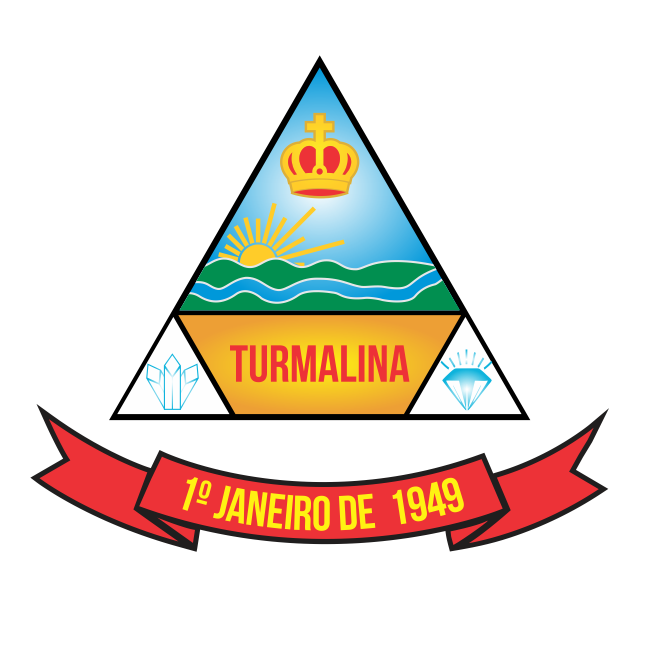
- Flag Coat of arms

- Location of Turmalina in the state of Minas Gerais

- Location within Brazil
- Coordinates: 17.285833°S 42.73°W
- Country: Brazil
- State: Minas Gerais
- Intermediate Geographic Region: Teófilo Otoni
- Immediate Geographic Region: Capelinha

Area
  - Total: 1,153.086 km^{2} (445.209 sq mi)
- Elevation: 467 m (1,532 ft)

Population (2020)
  - Total: 20,125
  - Density: 17.453/km^{2} (45.203/sq mi)
- Time zone: UTC−3 (BRT)

Turmalina is a municipality in the northeast of the Brazilian state of Minas Gerais. As of 2020, the population was 20,125 in a total area of 1,153 km^{2} (445 sq mi). The elevation of the urban area is 718 meters. It is part of the IBGE statistical meso-region of Jequitinhonha and the micro-region of Capelinha. It became a municipality in 1949.

The economy is based on cattle raising, services, and subsistence agriculture, with the main crops being coffee, rice, beans, sugarcane, and corn. There were plantations of eucalyptus trees for charcoal production. In 2005, there were 1,053 rural producers but only 18 tractors. 3,900 persons were dependent on agriculture. As of 2005, there were 13 public health clinics, with 1 of them carrying out diagnosis and complete therapy. There was one hospital with 72 beds. Educational needs were met by 17 primary schools, 3 middle schools and 2 nursery schools. There were 1,101 automobiles in 2006, giving a ratio of 17 inhabitants per automobile (there were 1,988 motorcycles). In 2007, one branch of a bank serviced the area.

Neighboring municipalities are: Bocaiúva, Botumirim, Capelinha, Carbonita, Leme do Prado, Minas Novas and Veredinha. The distance to Belo Horizonte is 500 km.

== Social indicators ==
Turmalina is ranked average on the MHDI and was in the middle tier of the municipalities in the state and in the country in 2000.

- MHDI: .705 (2000)
- State ranking: 524 out of 853 municipalities
- National ranking: 2,913 out of 5,138 municipalities in 2000
- Life expectancy: 71
- Literacy rate: 77
- Combined primary, secondary and tertiary gross enrolment ratio: .758
- Per capita income (monthly): R$125.00
- Infant mortality rate: 3.15

The figures above can be compared with those of Poços de Caldas, which had an MHDI of .841, the highest in the state of Minas Gerais. The highest in the country was São Caetano do Sul in the state of São Paulo with an MHDI of .919. The lowest was Manari in the state of Pernambuco with an MHDI of .467 out of a total of 5504 municipalities in the country as of 2004. At last count, Brazil had 5,561 municipalities.

== See also ==
- List of municipalities in Minas Gerais
