= Araçuaí River =

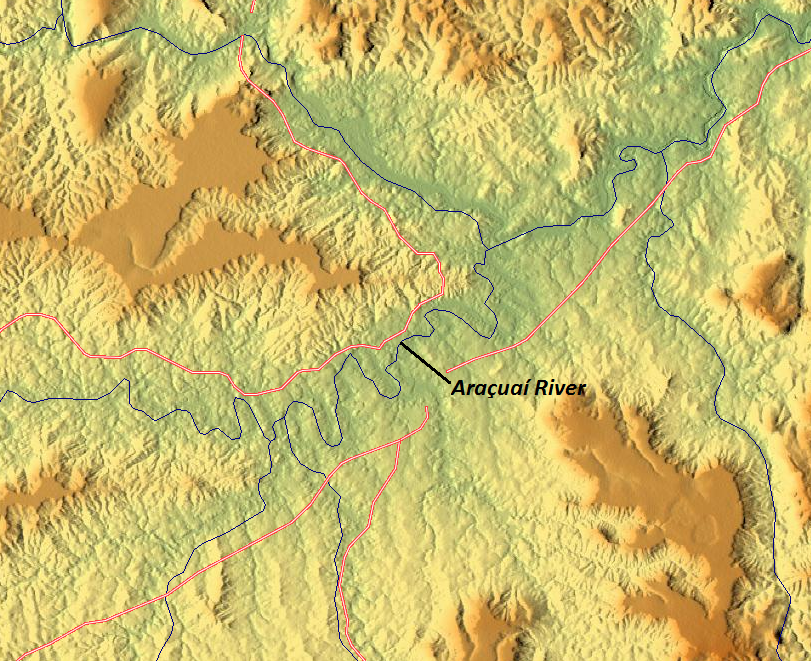

Location
- Country: Brazil

Physical characteristics
- Source
  - location: Minas Gerais state
- Length: 319 km (198 mi)

Basin features
- Tributaries
  - left: Capivara, Fanado, Itamarandiba, Preto
  - right: Gravatá, Setúbal, Itacarambi

The Araçuaí River (Portuguese: Rio Araçuaí) is a river of Minas Gerais state in southeastern Brazil. The Araçuaí River flows through the Jequitinhonha Valley in the northeast of Minas Gerais, through the town of Araçuaí, which the river takes its name from. It is a tributary of the Jequitinhonha River, flowing south from its right bank. The confluence of the river is located at 16°45′45″S 42°0′32″W. Tributaries include the Gravatá River, Setúbal River, Capivara River, Fanado River and the Itamarandiba River.

== River valley ==
According to the Fundação João Pinheiro (FJP) (João Pinheiro Foundation), an agency of the government of the state of Minas Gerais, which has the responsibility to provide technical support services to the State Secretariat for Planning and Management and other state operational systems, the Araçuaí River raises in the Senador Modestino Gonçalves district and joins the Jequitinhonha River in the Araçuai district near the Araçuai town, after traversing a distance of 319.2 kilometres (198.3 mi) from its source. The river basin includes the 498 hectares (1,230 acres) Mata dos Ausentes Ecological Station, a fully protected conservation unit.

The Araçuaí River valley is famous for the settlements that got established during the gold rush period in the early 18th century, in the region of Minas Novas when Sebastião Leme do Prado located gold veins. The Berilo town, known then as Água Suja, got established at the confluence of the Araçuaí River and the Água Suja stream. As gold mines were fully exploited and exhausted in the valleys' by the 1730s, agricultural produce got a boost with cultivation of corn and cotton. Cattle breeding in ranches also evolved as a basic sustenance need of the people. However, in the 19th century Araçuaí became one of the important cotton producing regions in northern region of Minas and was one of major supply bases for a number of cotton mills that got established by 1868 with the initiative of the Mascernhas brothers, not only in the Municipal district of Sete Lagoas but also in several other municipal districts close to the cotton producing regions.

The Araçuaí River valley is part of one of the four districts in the northeast of Minas Gerais (considered as cradle of mineral resources, as it has the largest pegmatite source in Brazil) where major deposits of aquamarine, one of the precious gemstone repository in Brazil, has been found. The area has been identified along the Araçuaí River course on the north and its southern tributaries on the south. Consequently, in the southern part of the river valley, the cities of Minas Novas, Turmalina, Capelinha, Malacacheta, Novo Cruzeiro and Lufa have been established. The primary and secondary deposits have been fully exploited in some of the well known mines that surround the small town of Araçuaí (in the middle of Minas Gerais province), such as the Coronel Murta (for aquamarine), the Rubelita (for tourmaline), Itinga and Taquaral. However, in spite of so many rich mines, the rural town of Araçuaí, in the upper Jequitinhonha Valley, has not developed and is considered the poorest part with "its social and economic similarities to the semi-arid northeast of Brazil".

The Araçuaí River caused severe floods in 1928, which resulted in damages to most buildings and mansions along its river bank. However, the monuments that have survived the flood devastation are the Nossa Senhora do Rosário Church and the old mansions of Domingos de Abreu Vieira in Araçuaí town.

Geology

The geological formation of the Araçuaí River valley has been categorized as the Araçuaí Belt or the Araçuaí Orogen, a confined orogen. Its African counterpart is known as the West Congo Belt, with the southern limit extending to the São Francisco Craton. Its formation is attributed to the Mesozoic age, as an Araçuaí-West Congo Orogen, a single belt of the Araçuaí-West Congo Orogen, also known as the Brasiliano-Pan-African orogen. The world's largest pegmatite deposits, with gemstones such as emeralds, topaz, aquamarine and tourmaline are found in these geological formations. The Pegmaties also have lithium-bearing strata in the Aricuai-Itinga region of the Jequithinhona valley in the province; 2500 tonnes of petalite was exported in the past, in addition to domestic consumption of 1600 tonnes. Other by-products produced included lepidolite, amblygonite (used for conversion to lithium chemicals) and spodumene.

== Water resources ==
A water management system is under implementation, which envisages to provide water supply and sanitation services to the Araçuaí and Carbonita cities. Under this plan, funded by the World Bank, with a loan of US$198 million with 20% matching funds shared by the concerned two city municipalities, reservoirs and distribution network have been proposed to benefit a population of 47,000 in the two cities with sanitation facilities. IGAM, the Minas Gerais state water management body facilitated this project on the river, from November 2002.

Power development

In 1990, $50 million was reported to have been spent on two sets of generators for the Santa Rita Dam on the Araçuaí River, with the purpose of generating 75 megawatts.

== Aqua fauna ==
One of the rear fish species found in 1874 in the Araçuaí River is the Steindachnerina elegans (or curimatus elegans) (Steindachneridion is a genus of South American Pimelodid catfish). During a field study of fish species in the Jequitinhonha basin of which Araçuaí River valley is a sub basin, 19 species were identified including "Astyanax lacustris; Astyanax rivularis; Characidium sp 1; Hyphessobrycon sp.; Hemigrammus sp.; Hoplias malabaricus; Parotocinclus sp.; Otothyris travassosi; Hypostomus sp.; Hypostominae; Pimelodella sp.; Rhamdia jequitinhonha; Trichomycterus jequitinhonha; Trichomycterus itacambiruçu; Trichomycterus sp.n. 2; Poecilia reticulata; Geophagus brasiliensis; Oreochromis niloticus; and Synbranchus marmoratus.
