= Irapé Dam =

- Location within Brazil
- Official name: Usina Presidente Juscelino Kubitschek
- Country: Brazil
- Location: Berilo/Grão Mogol districts
- Coordinates: 16°44′15″S 42°34′30″W
- Purpose: Power
- Status: Operational
- Construction began: 2002
- Opening date: 2006
- Construction cost: R$1 billion (~US$480 million)

Dam and spillways
- Type of dam: Embankment, rock-fill
- Impounds: Jequitinhonha River
- Height: 208 m (682 ft)
- Length: 500 m (1,600 ft)
- Elevation at crest: 515.5 m (1,691 ft)
- Dam volume: 10,300,000 m^{3} (360,000,000 cu ft)
- Spillway capacity: 6,000 m^{3}/s (210,000 cu ft/s)

Reservoir
- Surface area: 137 km^{2} (53 sq mi)
- Normal elevation: 510 m (1,670 ft)

Power Station
- Commission date: 20 July 2006
- Turbines: 3 × 120 MW (160,000 hp) Francis-type
- Installed capacity: 360 MW (480,000 hp); 390 MW (520,000 hp)* (*=max. planned)

Irapé Dam, the tallest dam in Brazil, is an embankment dam on the Jequitinhonha River in the state of Minas Gerais. It is on the border of Berilo and Grão Mogol districts, about 26 kilometres (16 mi) west of Virgem da Lapa. The dam was constructed between 2002 and 2006 for the purpose of hydroelectric power generation.

== History ==
In 1963, the Jequitinhonha River was studied for its hydroelectric potential and the studies were reviewed in 1984. Brazilian power company CEMIG won the bid to build the Irapé Dam in 1998. Construction on the dam began in September 2002 and in September of that year, the power plant was officially renamed Juscelino Kubitschek Power Plant, after the former President of Brazil. The river diversion was complete by April 2003 with two 14-metre (46 ft) diameter tunnels; one 1,227 metres (4,026 ft) in length and the other 1,067 metres (3,501 ft). The dam's reservoir began to fill in December 2005 and the first of the power plant's generators was commissioned on 20 July 2006. The second generator was commissioned in August and the third in October 2006. At the time of its completion it was the tallest dam in Brazil.

== Design ==
The dam is a rock-fill-type with a height of 208 metres (682 ft) and length of 500 metres (1,600 ft). It is built within a steep canyon just upstream of a bend in the river. Total structural volume amounts to about 10,300,000 cubic metres (360,000,000 cu ft). The reservoir created by the dam has a surface area of 137 square kilometres (53 sq mi). Controlling overflow are three 634-metre-long (2,080 ft) spillway tunnels. Each diverts water from the reservoir to the eastern side of a bend in the river. Two of the tunnels are located high above the valley while one is at an intermediate height. Each tunnel has a maximum discharge capacity of 2,000 cubic metres per second (71,000 cu ft/s), making the total maximum discharge capacity of the spillway 6,000 cubic metres per second (210,000 cu ft/s).

== Juscelino Kubitschek Power Plant ==
Juscelino Kubitschek Power Plant is located at the dam's base and houses three 120 megawatts (160,000 hp) Francis turbine-generators for an installed capacity of 360 megawatts (480,000 hp). The generators are rated to operate at 130 megawatts (170,000 hp) though, providing a maximum capacity of 390 megawatts (520,000 hp).

== See also ==
- List of tallest dams in the world
- List of power stations in Brazil
