= Carbonita =

- Municipality
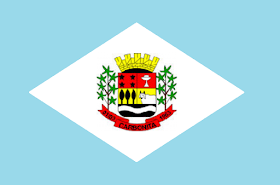
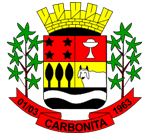
- Flag Coat of arms

- Location of Carbonita in the State of Minas Gerais
- Coordinates: 17.526944°S 43.015833°W
- Country: Brazil
- Region: Southeast
- State: Minas Gerais
- Intermediate Geographic Region: Teófilo Otoni
- Immediate Geographic Region: Diamantina

Area
  - Total: 1,454 km^{2} (561 sq mi)
- Elevation: 751 m (2,464 ft)

Population (2021)
  - Total: 9,423
  - Density: 6.28/km^{2} (16.3/sq mi)
- Time zone: UTC−3 (BRT)

Carbonita is a municipality in the northeast of the Brazilian state of Minas Gerais. As of 2020 the population was 9,414 in a total area of 1,454 km^{2}. The elevation of the town center is 751 meters. The city belongs to the Immediate Geographic Region of Diamantina. It became a municipality in 1963. Neighboring municipalities are: Turmalina, Veredinha, Itamarandiba, Diamantina, Senador Modestino Gonçalves and Bocaiúva. The distance to Belo Horizonte is 421 km. The nearest major population center, Itamarandiba, is 46 km on secondary roads. Highway access from the capital is made by Curvelo and Diamantina, via BR-040, BR-135, BR-259, and BR-367; from João Monlevade, Guanhães, São João Evangelista, Coluna and Itamarandiba, via BR-381, MG-129, BR-120, and BR-451.

== Economy ==
The economy is based on cattle raising and agriculture, with the main crops being coffee, sugarcane, and corn. There are extensive plantations of eucalyptus trees for charcoal production. In 2005 there were 629 rural producers but only 13 tractors. As of 2005 there was one hospital with 22 beds and 6 public health clinics. Educational needs were met by 7 primary schools and 1 middle school. There were 779 automobiles in 2006, giving a ratio of 12 inhabitants per automobile (there were 902 motorcycles). There was one bank in 2007.

== Social indicators ==
Carbonita is ranked low on the MHDI and was one of the poorest municipalities in the state and in the country in 2000.

- MHDI: .679 (2000)
- State ranking: 639 out of 853 municipalities
- National ranking: 3,313 out of 5,138 municipalities in 2000
- Life expectancy: 67
- Literacy rate: 74
- Combined primary, secondary and tertiary gross enrolment ratio: .827
- Per capita income (monthly): R$112.00
- Urbanization rate: 62.03 (national rate was 81.25)
- Percentage of urban residences connected to sewage system: 72.20 (national rate was 69.52)
- Infant mortality rate: 15.38 (the national average was 18.91).

The above figures can be compared with those of Poços de Caldas, which had an MHDI of .841, the highest in the state of Minas Gerais. The highest in the country was São Caetano do Sul in the state of São Paulo with an MHDI of .919. The lowest was Manari in the state of Pernambuco with an MHDI of .467 out of a total of 5504 municipalities in the country as of 2004.

== Climate ==
Climate data for Carbonita (1991–2020)
Month	Jan	Feb	Mar	Apr	May	Jun	Jul	Aug	Sep	Oct	Nov	Dec	Year
Mean daily maximum °C (°F)	30.1 (86.2)	30.5 (86.9)	29.7 (85.5)	28.7 (83.7)	27.0 (80.6)	26.1 (79.0)	26.1 (79.0)	27.6 (81.7)	29.4 (84.9)	30.3 (86.5)	28.9 (84.0)	29.4 (84.9)	28.7 (83.7)
Daily mean °C (°F)	23.6 (74.5)	23.7 (74.7)	23.3 (73.9)	22.2 (72.0)	19.9 (67.8)	18.4 (65.1)	18.0 (64.4)	19.3 (66.7)	21.5 (70.7)	23.0 (73.4)	22.8 (73.0)	23.2 (73.8)	21.6 (70.9)
Mean daily minimum °C (°F)	18.5 (65.3)	18.4 (65.1)	18.4 (65.1)	17.1 (62.8)	14.2 (57.6)	12.3 (54.1)	11.5 (52.7)	12.0 (53.6)	14.6 (58.3)	17.1 (62.8)	18.3 (64.9)	18.6 (65.5)	15.9 (60.6)
Average precipitation mm (inches)	150.5 (5.93)	108.1 (4.26)	120.0 (4.72)	44.5 (1.75)	18.2 (0.72)	3.1 (0.12)	3.2 (0.13)	3.6 (0.14)	19.3 (0.76)	81.8 (3.22)	195.6 (7.70)	236.7 (9.32)	984.6 (38.76)
Average precipitation days (≥ 1.0 mm)	10	8	9	4	2	1	1	1	2	6	13	14	71
Average relative humidity (%)	71.1	69.7	72.6	72.7	73.2	71.7	67.4	60.7	57.2	61.2	71.6	74.2	68.6
Source: Instituto Nacional de Meteorologia

== See also ==
- List of municipalities in Minas Gerais
