= Chapada do Norte =

Municipality in Minas Gerais, Brazil

Coordinates: 17°31′37″S 43°00′57″W

- Municipality
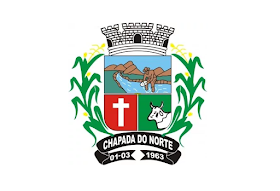
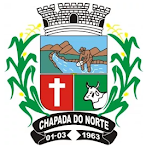
- Flag Coat of arms

- Location in Minas Gerais

- Location in Brazil
- Country: Brazil
- Region: Southeast
- State: Minas Gerais
- Intermediate Geographic Region: Teófilo Otoni
- Immediate Geographic Region: Capelinha

Area
  - Total: 830.833 km^{2} (320.786 sq mi)

Population (2022)
  - Total: 10,337
  - Density: 12.44/km^{2} (32.2/sq mi)
- Demonym: chapadense
- Time zone: UTC−3 (BRT)
- Website: www.chapadadonorte.mg.gov.br

Chapada do Norte is a Brazilian municipality in the northeast of the Brazilian state of Minas Gerais. As of 2020, the population was 15,345 in a total area of 828 km^{2} (320 sq mi). The elevation of the town center is 751 meters. It is part of the IBGE statistical meso-region of Jequitinhonha and the micro-region of Capelinha. It became a municipality in 1963.

The economy is based on charcoal production, cattle raising and subsistence agriculture, with the main crops being beans, manioc, sugarcane, and corn. There are extensive plantations of eucalyptus trees for charcoal production. In 2005 there were 2150 rural producers but only 4 tractors. As of 2005 there were 7 public health clinics. Educational needs were met by 33 primary schools and 4 middle schools. There were 185 automobiles in 2006, giving a ratio of 83 inhabitants per automobile (there were 461 motorcycles). There was one bank in 2007.

Neighboring municipalities are: Turmalina, Veredinha, Itamarandiba, Diamantina, Senador Modestino Gonçalves, and Bocaiúva. The distance to Belo Horizonte is 421 km. The nearest major population center, Itamarandiba, is 46 km on secondary roads. Highway access from the capital is made by Curvelo and Diamantina, via BR-040, BR-135, BR-259 and BR-367; from João Monlevade, Guanhães, São João Evangelista, Coluna, and Itamarandiba, via BR-381, MG-129, BR-120 and BR-451.

== Social indicators ==
Chapada do Norte is ranked low on the MHDI and was one of the poorest municipalities in the state and in the country in 2000.

- MHDI: .679 (2000)
- State ranking: 639 out of 853 municipalities
- National ranking: 3,313 out of 5,138 municipalities in 2000
- Life expectancy: 67
- Literacy rate: 74
- Combined primary, secondary and tertiary gross enrolment ratio: .827
- Per capita income (monthly): R$112.00
- Urbanization rate: 62.03 (national rate was 81.25)
- Percentage of urban residences connected to sewage system: 72.20 (national rate was 69.52)
- Infant mortality rate: 15.38 (the national average was 18.91).

The above figures can be compared with those of Poços de Caldas, which had an MHDI of .841, the highest in the state of Minas Gerais. The highest in the country was São Caetano do Sul in the state of São Paulo with an MHDI of .919. The lowest was Manari in the state of Pernambuco with an MHDI of .467 out of a total of 5504 municipalities in the country as of 2004.

== See also ==
- List of municipalities in Minas Gerais
