= Itamarandiba =

Coordinates: 17°51′25″S 42°51′32″W

- Municipality
- Município de Itamarandiba; Municipality of Itamarandiba
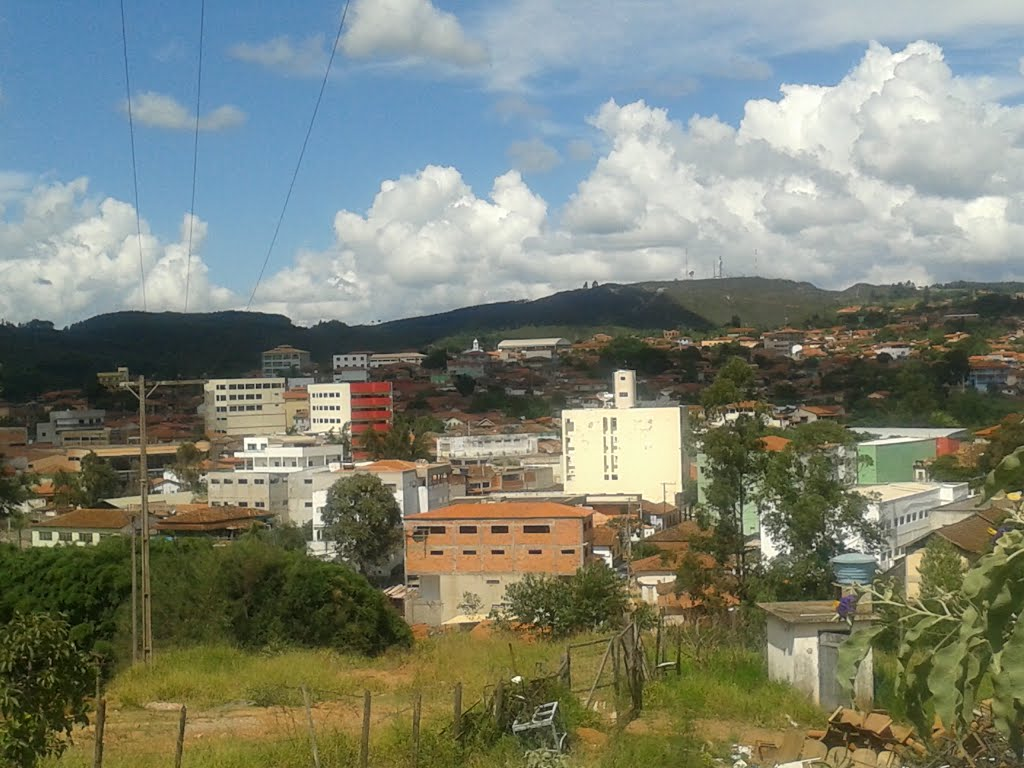
- Partial view of Itamarandiba

- Flag
- Nicknames: Brazilian Capital of Eucalyptus; Minas' Capital of Honey; Ita; ItaCity (Portuguese pronunciation: [itɐˈsitʃi])
- Location in Minas Gerais

- Location in Brazil
- Country: Brazil
- Region: Southeast
- State: Minas Gerais
- Intermediate Geographic Region: Teófilo Otoni
- Immediate Geographic Region: Capelinha
- Founded: June 24, 1675
- Incorporated (as city): June 24, 1675

Government
  - Mayor: Luís Fernando Alves (PTdoB)

Area
  - Total: 2,736 km^{2} (1,056 sq mi)
- Elevation: 910 m (2,990 ft)

Population (2020)
  - Total: 34,936
- Demonym: Itamarandibano (Portuguese pronunciation: [itamaɾɐ̃dʒiˈbɐnu])
- Time zone: UTC−3 (BRT)
- Postal Code: 39.670-000
- Area code: (+55) 38
- Website: Town Hall of Itamarandiba

Itamarandiba (Portuguese pronunciation: [itamaɾɐ̃ˈdʒibɐ]) is a Brazilian municipality located in the north-center of the state of Minas Gerais. Its population as of 2020 was 34,936 living in a total area of 2,736 km^{2}.

== Location ==
The city belongs to the statistical mesoregion of Jequitinhonha and to the statistical microregion of Capelinha. It became a municipality in 1862.

Itamarandiba is located at an elevation of 910 meters near the headwaters of the Rio Araçuai, which flows north into the Jequitinhonha River. It is northeast of Diamantina, Highway access is made by BR-451 and MG-214. This is one principal city of region.

The distance to Belo Horizonte is 380 km. Neighboring municipalities are: Diamantina, Aricanduva, Carbonita, Turmalina, Capelinha, Senador Modestino Gonçalves, Veredinha, Rio Vermelho, São Sebastião do Maranhão, Água Boa, and Coluna.

The municipality contains the 13,654-hectare (33,740-acre) Serra Negra State Park, created in 1998.

== Economy ==
The main economic activities are services, agriculture, and small industries. The planting of eucalyptus for charcoal production is important and coffee cultivation has been increasing in recent years. The GDP in 2005 was R$94 million (US$38.61 million), with 60 million from services, 7 million from industry, and 20 million from agriculture. There were 1,981 rural producers on 84,000 hectares of land. Only 93 farms had tractors (2006). The main crops (2007) were eucalyptus trees, sugarcane, coffee (800 hectares), beans, and corn (2,600 hectares). There were 30,000 head of cattle (2006). In 2007 there was 1 bank.

== Social indicators ==
Itamarandiba is ranked in the bottom tier of municipalities in the state in human development.

- Municipal Human Development Index: 0.663 (2000)
- State ranking: 699 out of 853 municipalities as of 2000
- National ranking: 3565 out of 5,138 municipalities as of 2000
- Literacy rate: 72%
- Life expectancy: 67 (average of males and females)

In terms of HDI, the highest ranking municipality in Minas Gerais in 2000 was Poços de Caldas with 0.841, while the lowest was Setubinha with 0.568. Nationally the highest was São Caetano do Sul in São Paulo with 0.919, while the lowest was Setubinha. In more recent statistics (considering 5,507 municipalities) Manari in the state of Pernambuco has the lowest rating in the country—0,467—putting it in last place.

There were 17 health clinics and 2 hospitals with 90 beds in 2005. Educational needs were met by 44 primary schools and 1 middle school. There were campuses of a private college and a public college.

== Climate ==
Climate data for Itamarandiba (1981–2010)
Month	Jan	Feb	Mar	Apr	May	Jun	Jul	Aug	Sep	Oct	Nov	Dec	Year
Mean daily maximum °C (°F)	27.9 (82.2)	28.6 (83.5)	27.8 (82.0)	26.4 (79.5)	25.0 (77.0)	24.0 (75.2)	23.7 (74.7)	25.1 (77.2)	26.6 (79.9)	27.4 (81.3)	27.1 (80.8)	27.4 (81.3)	26.4 (79.5)
Daily mean °C (°F)	22.1 (71.8)	22.3 (72.1)	22.0 (71.6)	20.6 (69.1)	18.7 (65.7)	17.1 (62.8)	16.8 (62.2)	17.7 (63.9)	19.6 (67.3)	21.1 (70.0)	21.4 (70.5)	21.9 (71.4)	20.1 (68.2)
Mean daily minimum °C (°F)	17.9 (64.2)	17.7 (63.9)	17.8 (64.0)	16.4 (61.5)	14.0 (57.2)	11.9 (53.4)	11.7 (53.1)	11.9 (53.4)	14.0 (57.2)	16.1 (61.0)	17.2 (63.0)	17.9 (64.2)	15.4 (59.7)
Average precipitation mm (inches)	185.9 (7.32)	104.3 (4.11)	135.7 (5.34)	46.9 (1.85)	12.9 (0.51)	4.1 (0.16)	5.8 (0.23)	8.0 (0.31)	24.3 (0.96)	98.7 (3.89)	222.5 (8.76)	227.0 (8.94)	1,076.1 (42.37)
Average precipitation days (≥ 1.0 mm)	13	8	10	5	2	1	2	2	3	6	14	16	82
Average relative humidity (%)	80.6	78.7	81.5	81.4	81.1	79.8	78.2	72.2	70.8	72.0	79.1	81.4	78.1
Mean monthly sunshine hours	162.8	184.8	168.2	181.8	185.1	194.0	177.2	202.4	164.8	168.2	143.3	145.5	2,078.1
Source: Instituto Nacional de Meteorologia

== See also ==
- List of municipalities in Minas Gerais
