= Leme do Prado =

- Municipality
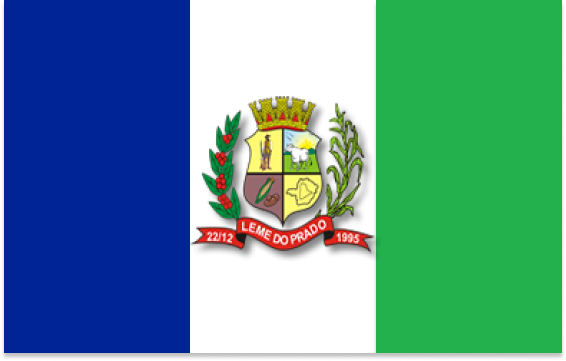
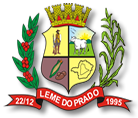
- Flag Coat of arms

- Location of Leme do Prado in the state of Minas Gerais

- Location within Brazil
- Coordinates: 17.081°S 42.694°W
- Country: Brazil
- State: Minas Gerais
- Municipality: Leme do Prado
- Intermediate Geographic Region: Teófilo Otoni
- Immediate Geographic Region: Capelinha

Area
  - Total: 281 km^{2} (108 sq mi)
- Elevation: 431 m (1,414 ft)

Population (2020)
  - Total: 4,920
  - Density: 17.5/km^{2} (45.3/sq mi)
- Time zone: UTC−3 (BRT)

Leme do Prado is a municipality in the northeast of the Brazilian state of Minas Gerais. As of 2020 the population was 4,920 in a total area of 281 square kilometres (108 sq mi).

== Geography ==
The elevation is 431 meters. It is part of the IBGE statistical meso-region of Jequitinhonha and the micro-region of Capelinha. It became a municipality in 1995.

The municipality contains part of the 5,192 hectares (12,830 acres) Acauã Ecological Station, a fully protected conservation unit created in 1974.

== Economy ==
The economy is based on cattle raising, services, and agriculture, with the main crops being coffee, rice, beans, sugarcane, and corn. There were plantations of eucalyptus trees for charcoal production. In 2005 there were 404 rural producers but only 5 tractors. 1,200 people were dependent on agriculture. As of 2005 there were 6 public health clinics, with 2 of them carrying out diagnosis and complete therapy. Educational needs were met by 8 primary schools and 1 middle school. There were 113 automobiles in 2006, giving a ratio of 49 inhabitants per automobile (there were 299 motorcycles). There were no banks in 2007.

Neighboring municipalities are: Botumirim, José Gonçalves de Minas, Chapada do Norte, and Turmalina. The distance to Belo Horizonte is 492 km.

== Social indicators ==
Leme do Prado is ranked low on the MHDI and was one of the poorest municipalities in the state and in the country in 2000.

- MHDI: .683 (2000)
- State ranking: 619 out of 853 municipalities
- National ranking: 3,257 out of 5,138 municipalities in 2000
- Life expectancy: 66
- Literacy rate: 78
- Combined primary, secondary and tertiary gross enrolment ratio: .797
- Per capita income (monthly): R$118.00

The figures above can be compared with those of Poços de Caldas, which had an MHDI of .841, the highest in the state of Minas Gerais. The highest in the country was São Caetano do Sul in the state of São Paulo with an MHDI of .919. The lowest was Manari in the state of Pernambuco with an MHDI of .467 out of a total of 5504 municipalities in the country as of 2004.

== See also ==
- List of municipalities in Minas Gerais
