= Jenipapo de Minas =

Human settlement in Brazil

Coordinates: 17°04′58″S 42°15′28″W

- Municipality
- Interactive map of Jenipapo de Minas
- Country: Brazil
- State: Minas Gerais
- Region: Southeast
- Time zone: UTC−3 (BRT)

Location of Jenipapo de Minas in the state of Minas Gerais

Jenipapo de Minas is a municipality in the northeast of the Brazilian state of Minas Gerais. As of 2020 the population was 7,738 in a total area of 284 km^{2} (110 sq mi). The elevation of the town center is 521 meters. It is part of the IBGE statistical meso-region of Jequitinhonha and the micro-region of Capelinha. It became a municipality in 1997.

The economy is based on charcoal production, cattle raising and subsistence agriculture, with the main crops being beans, manioc, sugarcane, and corn. There are extensive plantations of eucalyptus trees for charcoal production. In 2005 there were 642 rural producers but only 5 tractors. As of 2005 there were 3 public health clinics. Educational needs were met by 15 primary schools and 1 middle school. There were 64 automobiles in 2006, giving a ratio of 107 inhabitants per automobile (there were 293 motorcycles). There were no banks in 2007.

Neighboring municipalities are: Araçuaí and Francisco Badaró. The distance to Belo Horizonte is 734 km.

== Social indicators ==
Jenipapo de Minas is ranked low on the MHDI and was one of the poorest municipalities in the state and in the country in 2000.

- MHDI: .618 (2000)
- State ranking: 809 out of 853 municipalities
- National ranking: 4,349 out of 5,138 municipalities in 2000
- Life expectancy: 64
- Literacy rate: 64
- Combined primary, secondary and tertiary gross enrolment ratio: .763
- Per capita income (monthly): R$84.00

The above figures can be compared with those of Poços de Caldas, which had an MHDI of .841, the highest in the state of Minas Gerais. The highest in the country was São Caetano do Sul in the state of São Paulo with an MHDI of .919. The lowest was Manari in the state of Pernambuco with an MHDI of .467 out of a total of 5504 municipalities in the country as of 2004. At last count Brazil had 5,561 municipalities so this might have changed at the time of this writing.

== See also ==
- List of municipalities in Minas Gerais
