= Botumirim =

Human settlement in Brazil

Coordinates: 16°51′55″S 43°00′19″W

- Municipality
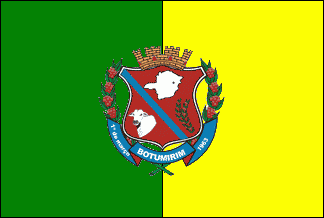
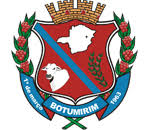
- Flag Coat of arms
- Interactive map of Botumirim
- Country: Brazil
- State: Minas Gerais
- Region: Southeast
- Time zone: UTC−3 (BRT)

Location of Botumirim within the state of Minas Gerais

Botumirim is a Brazilian municipality located in the north of the state of Minas Gerais. In 2020 the population was 6,288 in a total area of 1,572 km^{2}. The elevation is 948 meters. It became a municipality in 1962.

== Geography ==
Botumirim is located in the Serra do Espinhaço mountains east of Montes Claros. It is 60 km south of the BR-251 highway and is connected to Grão Mogol, which is 42 km. to the northeast, by dirt roads. The distance to Belo Horizonte is 512 km (318 mi).

Botumirim is part of the statistical microregion of Grão Mogol. Neighboring municipalities are: Grão Mogol, Itacambira, Bocaiúva, Turmalina, Leme do Prado, José Gonçalves de Minas, and Cristália.

The climate is semi-arid, meaning it has slightly more rain than an arid climate. The average annual temperature is 22.4 C. The average annual maximum temperature is 29.3 C and the average annual minimum temperature is 16.7 C. More than half of the area is considered mountainous with elevations between 1,625 meters and 640 meters. The main rivers are the Rio do Peixe and the Ribeirão da Onça.

== Economic activities ==
The most important economic activities are cattle raising (8,000 head in 2006) and agriculture. The GDP in 2005 was R$ 18,247,000. The most important agricultural crops are bananas, coffee, tropical and citrus fruits, peanuts, sugarcane, and corn. There was also production of charcoal from eucalyptus plantations. In the rural area there were 699 producers. The total area of agricultural land was 36,346 hectares in 2006. In the urban area there were no banking agencies in 2006.

== Health and education ==
This municipality is isolated from major population centers and suffers from drought and poor soils.

- Municipal Human Development Index: .665 (2000)
- State ranking: 695 out of 853 municipalities as of 2000
- National ranking: 3,542 out of 5,138 municipalities as of 2000

- Degree of urbanization: 48.38% (2000)
- Infant mortality rate: 21.01 (2000) The rate for Minas Gerais was 17.40; the rate for Brazil was 18.91.
- Illiteracy rate: 22.89% (15 years old or older)(Data from 2000) The rate for Minas Gerais was 11.96; the rate for Brazil was 13.63
- Urban area covered by sewage system: 0.90%--the rate for Minas Gerais was 81.39%
- Health clinics, health centers, and hospitals: 2, 3

== See also ==
- List of municipalities in Minas Gerais
