= Berilo =

Coordinates: 16°57′07″S 42°27′57″W

- Municipality
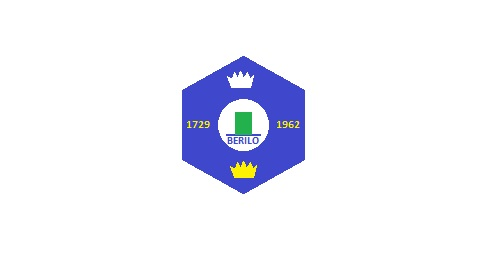
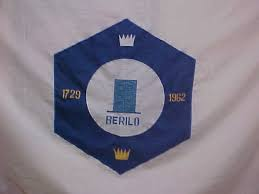
- Flag Coat of arms

- Country: Brazil
- State: Minas Gerais
- Time zone: UTC−3 (BRT)

Berilo (Portuguese pronunciation: [beˈɾilu]) is a municipality in the northeast of the Brazilian state of Minas Gerais. As of 2020 the population was 11,872 in a total area of 586 km^{2}. The elevation is 401 meters. It is part of the IBGE statistical meso-region of Jequitinhonha and the micro-region of Capelinha. It became a municipality in 1963.

The economy is based on cattle raising and agriculture, with the main crops being coffee, pineapple, sugarcane, and corn. There were plantations of eucalyptus trees for charcoal production. In 2005 there were 1830 rural producers but only 1 tractor. As of 2005 there was one hospital and five public health clinics. Educational needs were met by 19 primary schools and 2 middle schools. There were 304 automobiles in 2006, giving a ratio of 40 inhabitants per automobile (there were 813 motorcycles). There was one bank in 2007.

Neighboring municipalities are Francisco Badaró, Chapada do Norte, Virgem da Lapa, and José Gonçalves de Minas. The distance to Belo Horizonte is 545 km. The nearest major population center, Minas Novas (pop. 30,578 in 2007), is 42 km. on secondary roads.

== Social indicators ==
Berilo is ranked low on the MHDI and was one of the poorest municipalities in the state and in the country in 2000.

- MHDI: .680 (2000)
- State ranking: 636 out of 853 municipalities
- National ranking: 3,298 out of 5,138 municipalities in 2000
- Life expectancy: 70
- Literacy rate: 73
- Combined primary, secondary and tertiary gross enrollment ratio: .787
- Per capita income (monthly): R$92.00
- Urbanization rate: 23.35 (national rate was 81.25)
- Percentage of urban residences connected to sewage system: 49.50 (national rate was 69.52)
- Infant mortality rate: 10.20 (the national average was 18.91).

The above figures can be compared with those of Poços de Caldas, which had an MHDI of 0.841, the highest in the state of Minas Gerais. The highest in the country was São Caetano do Sul in the state of São Paulo with an MHDI of 0.919. The lowest was Manari in the state of Pernambuco with an MHDI of 0.467 out of a total of 5504 municipalities in the country as of 2004. At last count Brazil had 5,561 municipalities so this might have changed at the time of this writing.

== See also ==
- List of municipalities in Minas Gerais
