= Francisco Badaró =

- Municipality
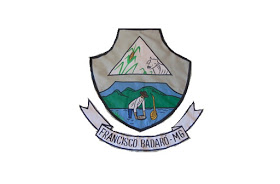
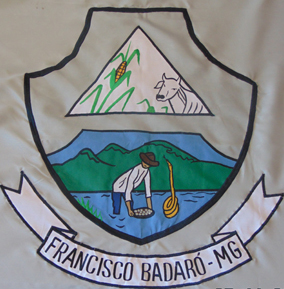
- Flag Coat of arms

- Map of Francisco Badaró in the state of Minas Gerais

- Location within Brazil
- Coordinates: 16°59′41″S 42°20′58″W
- Country: Brazil
- State: Minas Gerais
- Mesoregion: Jequitinhonha
- Founded: 30 December 1962

Area
  - Total: 463 km^{2} (179 sq mi)
- Elevation: 377 m (1,237 ft)

Population (2020)
  - Total: 10,321
  - Density: 22.3/km^{2} (57.7/sq mi)
- Time zone: UTC−3 (BRT)
- Neighbouring municipalities: Berilo; Jenipapo de Minas; Virgem da Lapa; Chapada do Norte; Araçuaí

Francisco Badaró is a municipality in the northeast of the Brazilian state of Minas Gerais. As of 2020 the population was 10,321 in a total area of 463 km^{2}. The elevation of the town center is 377 meters. It is part of the IBGE statistical mesoregion of Jequitinhonha and the micro-region of Capelinha. It became a municipality in 1962.

The economy is based on cattle raising and subsistence agriculture, with the main crops being beans, manioc, sugarcane, and corn.

Neighboring municipalities are Berilo, Jenipapo de Minas, Virgem da Lapa, Chapada do Norte, and Araçuaí. The distance to Belo Horizonte is 723 km.

== Social Indicators ==
Francisco Badaró is ranked low on the MHDI and was one of the poorest municipalities in the state and in the country in 2000.

- MHDI: .646 (2000)
- State ranking: 755 out of 853 municipalities
- National ranking: 3,831 out of 5,138 municipalities in 2000
- Life expectancy: 67
- Literacy rate: 68
- Combined primary, secondary and tertiary gross enrolment ratio: .705
- Per capita income (monthly): R$87.00

The above figures can be compared with those of Poços de Caldas, which had an MHDI of .841, the highest in the state of Minas Gerais. The highest in the country was São Caetano do Sul in the state of São Paulo with an MHDI of .919. The lowest was Manari in the state of Pernambuco with an MHDI of .467 out of a total of 5504 municipalities in the country as of 2004. At last count, Brazil had 5,561 municipalities.

== See also ==
- List of municipalities in Minas Gerais
