= Virgem da Lapa =

Municipality of Brazil

Coordinates: 16°49′S 42°21′W

- Municipality
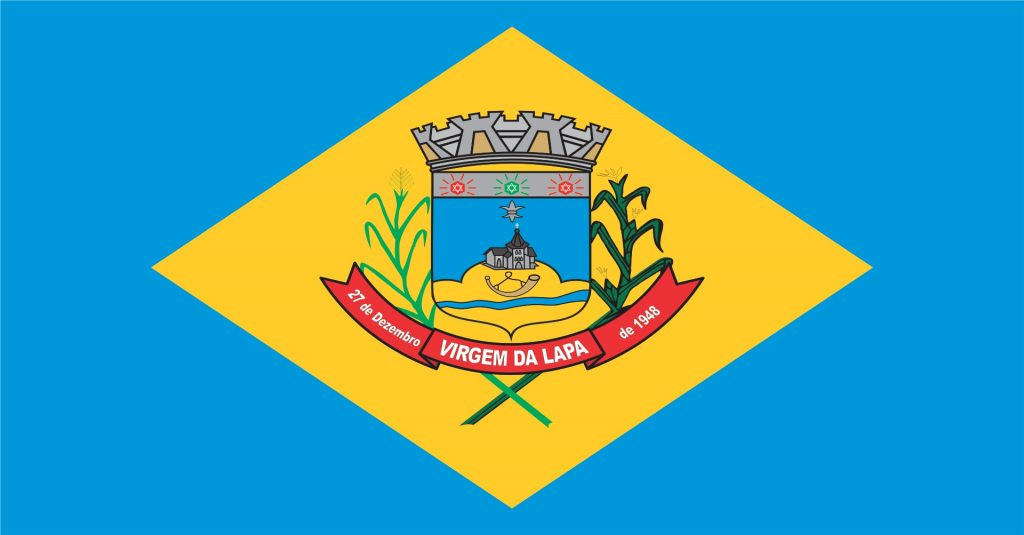
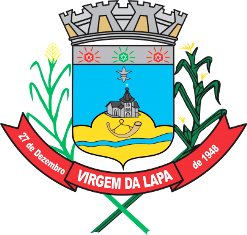
- Flag Coat of arms

- Country: Brazil
- State: Minas Gerais
- Incorporated: 27 December 1948

Government
  - Mayor: Averaldo Moreira Martins (PT)

Area
  - Total: 868,914 km^{2} (335,490 sq mi)

Population (2022)
  - Total: 11,804
  - Density: 13.58/km^{2} (35.2/sq mi)
- Demonym: virgolapense
- Time zone: UTC−3 (BRT)
- Postal Code: 39630-000
- Area code(s): +55 33
- Website: Virgem da Lapa, Minas Gerais

Virgem da Lapa (Portuguese pronunciation: [viʁˈʒẽj da ˈlapɐ]) is a Brazilian municipality located in the northeast of the state of Minas Gerais. Its population as of 2020 was estimated to be 13,740 people living in a total area of 871 km^{2} (336 sq mi). The city belongs to the mesoregion of Jequitinhonha and to the microregion of Araçuaí. It became a municipality in 1948. Neighboring municipalities are Rubelita, Josenópolis, Grão Mogol, Berilo, Francisco Badaró, Araçuaí, and Coronel Murta.

== Etymology ==
Virgem da Lapa ("Virgin of Lapa") honors Our Lady of Lapa (Nossa Senhora da Lapa), whose image was discovered near the city in a cave where there is now a sanctuary. Our Lady of Lapa is the patron saint of the Diocese of Araçuaí.

== History ==
The region that currently corresponds to the municipality of Virgem da Lapa was originally inhabited by the Aranã indigenous people. With the colonization process, the area began to be explored by garimpeiros (prospectors) in search of precious stones. In 1729, the Portuguese landowner Antônio Pereira dos Santos, who held numerous enslaved people, obtained a sesmaria (land grant) encompassing the left bank of the Araçuaí River and the right bank of the Jequitinhonha River, then part of the territory of Minas Novas. The intensification of prospecting activities and the discovery of an image of Our Lady of Lapa (Nossa Senhora da Lapa) led to the establishment of the settlement of São Domingos do Araçuaí. This community was annexed to the municipality of Araçuaí in 1891 and later emancipated on December 27, 1948, officially becoming the municipality of Virgem da Lapa.

== Geography ==
According to the regional division in force since 2017, established by the IBGE, the municipality belongs to the Intermediate Geographic Region of Teófilo Otoni and Immediate Geographic Region of Araçuaí. Until then, with the divisions into microregions and mesoregions in force, it was part of the microregion of Araçuaí, which in turn was included in the mesoregion of Jequitinhonha.

The Jequitinhonha River flows through the municipality, while the Araçuaí River marks the border with Francisco Badaró. The main access route to the city is via BR-367, which connects to MG-114, which in turn links to LMG-677.

== Economy ==
The GDP of Virgem da Lapa is approximately R$ 162.6 million, with 52.3% of the value added coming from public administration, followed by services (36.1%), agriculture and livestock (7.3%), and industry (4.3%). The per capita GDP of Virgem da Lapa is R$ 13,800.

== Culture ==
The main annual festival in Virgem da Lapa is the Festa de Agosto, a celebration in honor of Our Lady of Lapa that attracts many pilgrims and devotees from the region. Avenida Castelo Branco, in the city center, is lined with street vendors, and in the evening, performances by nationally famous artists take place.

== See also ==
- List of municipalities in Minas Gerais
