= Aricanduva, Minas Gerais =

Municipality of Brazil

Coordinates: 17°52′01″S 42°33′25″W

Aricanduva
- Municipality
- Municipality of Aricanduva
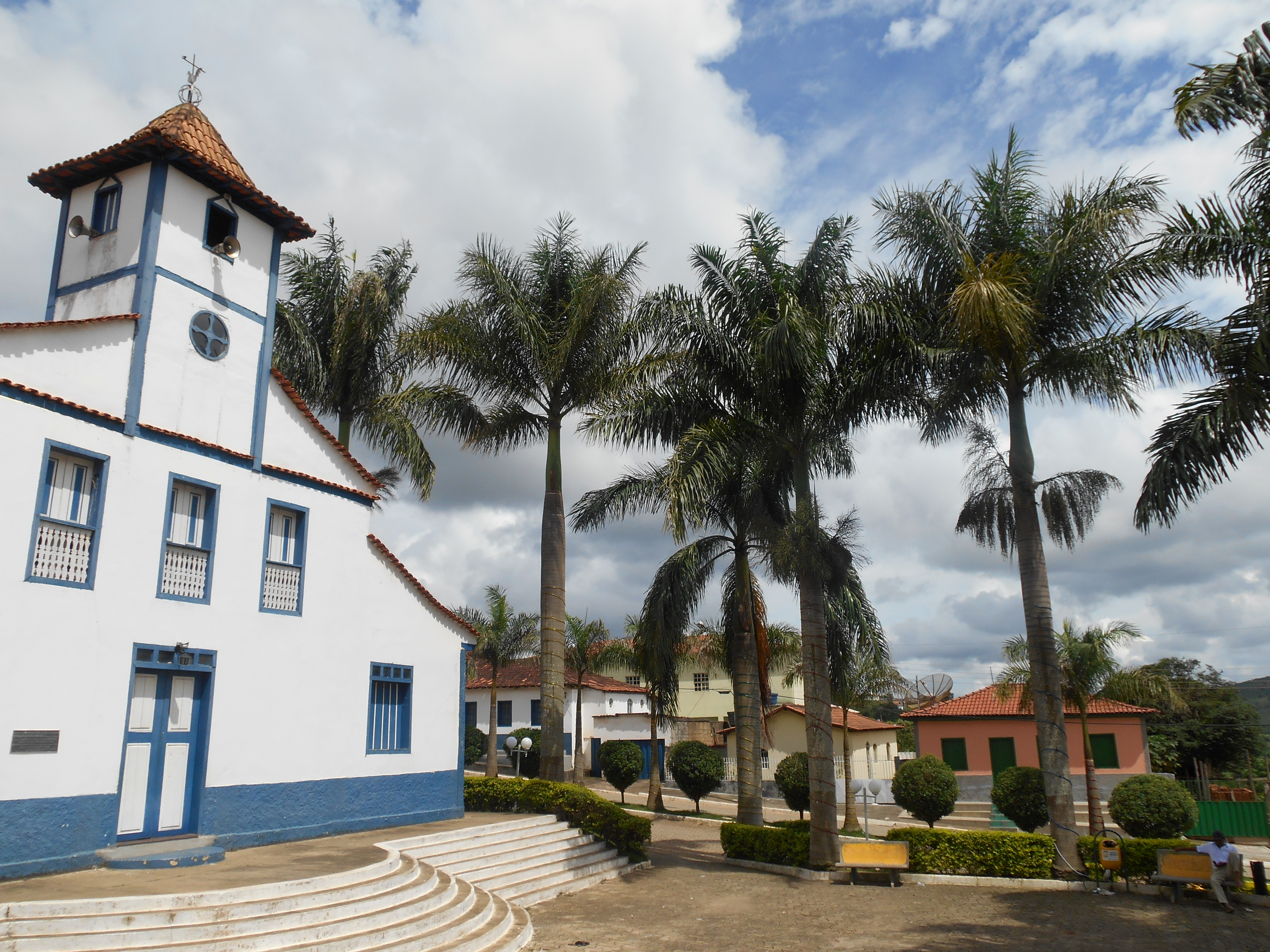
- Main Church of Aricanduva

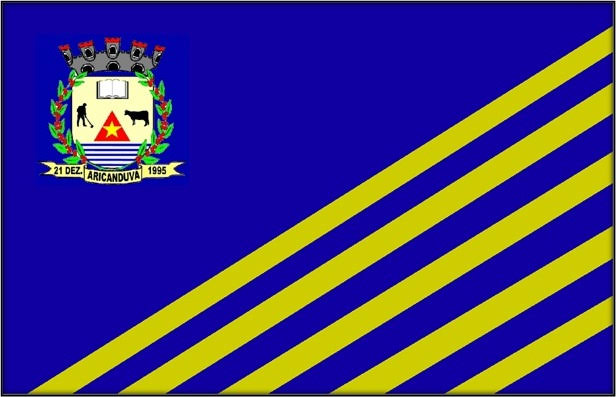
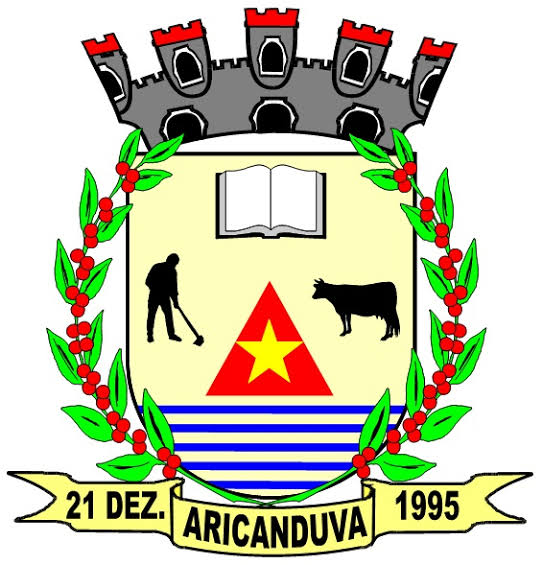
- Flag Coat of arms

- Location in Minas Gerais
- Country: Brazil
- State: Minas Gerais
- Region: Southeast
- Intermediate Region: Teófilo Otoni
- Immediate Region: Capelinha
- Founded: 21 December 1995

Government
  - Mayor: Valdeir Santos Coimbra (Republicanos)

Area
  - Total: 243.329 km^{2} (93.950 sq mi)
- Elevation: 781 m (2,562 ft)

Population (2021)
  - Total: 5,305
  - Density: 21.80/km^{2} (56.47/sq mi)
- Demonym: aricanduvense
- Time zone: UTC−3 (BRT)
- Postal Code: 39678-000 to 39679-999
- HDI (2010): 0.582 – medium
- Website: aricanduva.mg.gov.br

Aricanduva is a municipality in the northeast of the Brazilian state of Minas Gerais. As of 2020 the population was 5,269 in a total area of 243 km^{2} (94 sq mi). The elevation is 682 meters. It is part of the IBGE statistical meso-region of Jequitinhonha and the micro-region of Capelinha. It became a municipality in 1995.

== Economy ==
The economy is based on cattle raising and agriculture, with the main crops being coffee, sugarcane, and corn. There were plantations of eucalyptus trees for charcoal production. In 2005 there were 622 rural producers but only 7 tractors. As of 2005 there were no hospitals and 3 public health clinics. Educational needs were met by 11 primary schools and 1 middle school. There were 114 automobiles in 2006, giving a ratio of 45 inhabitants per automobile. There were no banks in 2007.

== Geography ==
Neighboring municipalities are: Capelinha, Itamarandiba and São Sebastião do Maranhão. The distance to Belo Horizonte is 419 km. The nearest major population center, Capelinha, is 15 km. on secondary roads.

== Municipal Human Development Index ==
Aricanduva is ranked very low on the MHDI and was one of the poorest municipalities in the state and in the country in 2000.

- MHDI: .636 (2000)
- State ranking: 773 out of 853 municipalities
- National ranking: 3,996 out of 5,138 municipalities in 2000
- Life expectancy: 70
- Literacy rate: 67 (For the complete list see Frigoletto)
- Combined primary, secondary and tertiary gross enrolment ratio: .728
- Per capita income (monthly): R$80.00
- Urbanization rate: 24.91
- Percentage of urban residences connected to sewage system: 65.70
- Infant mortality rate: 65.93 (the national average was 18.91).

The above figures can be compared with those of Poços de Caldas, which had an MHDI of .841, the highest in the state of Minas Gerais. The highest in the country was São Caetano do Sul in the state of São Paulo with an MHDI of .919. The lowest was Manari in the state of Pernambuco with an MHDI of .467 out of a total of 5504 municipalities in the country as of 2004. At last count Brazil had 5,561 municipalities so this might have changed at the time of this writing.

== See also ==
- List of municipalities in Minas Gerais
