= Capivara River (Araçuaí River tributary) =

Location
- Country: Brazil

Physical characteristics
- Source
  - location: Minas Gerais state
- Mouth: Araçuaí River
  - coordinates: 16°59′S 42°31′W

The Capivara River is a river of Minas Gerais state in southeastern Brazil. It is a tributary of the Araçuaí River.

== See also ==
- List of rivers of Minas Gerais
