= Angelândia =

- Municipality
- Municipality of Angelândia
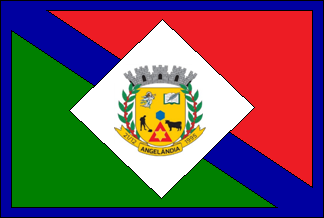
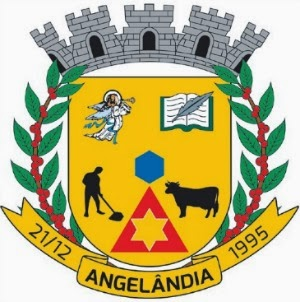
- Flag Coat of arms

- Location of Angelândia

- Location in Brazil
- Coordinates: 17°43′48″S 42°15′7″W
- Country: Brazil
- Region: Southeast
- State: Minas Gerais
- Intermediate Geographic Region: Teófilo Otoni
- Immediate Geographic Region: Capelinha

Angelândia is a municipality in the northeast of the Brazilian state of Minas Gerais. As of 2020 the population was 8,557 in a total area of 185 km^{2} (71 sq mi). Its elevation is 891 meters. The city is part of the Immediate Geographic Region of Capelinha. It became a municipality in 1995.

== Geography ==
Neighboring municipalities are: Minas Novas, Novo Cruzeiro, and Setubinha. The distance to Belo Horizonte is 449 km.

== Economy ==
The economy is based on cattle raising and agriculture, with the main crops being coffee, sugarcane, and corn. There were plantations of eucalyptus trees for charcoal production. In 2005 there were 690 rural producers but only 39 tractors. As of 2005 there were no hospitals and 1 public health clinic. Educational needs were met by 9 primary schools and 1 middle school. There were 198 automobiles in 2006, giving a ratio of 40 inhabitants per automobile. There were no banks in 2007.

== Municipal Human Development Index ==
Angelândia is ranked very low on the MHDI and was one of the poorest municipalities in the state and in the country in 2000.

- MHDI: .635 (2000)
- State ranking: 779 out of 853 municipalities
- National ranking: 4,026 out of 5,138 municipalities in 2000
- Life expectancy: 64
- Literacy rate: 66 (For the complete list see Frigoletto)
- Combined primary, secondary and tertiary gross enrolment ratio: .775
- Per capita income (monthly): R$127.00

The above figures can be compared with those of Poços de Caldas, which had an MHDI of .841, the highest in the state of Minas Gerais. The highest in the country was São Caetano do Sul in the state of São Paulo with an MHDI of .919. The lowest was Manari in the state of Pernambuco with an MHDI of .467 out of a total of 5504 municipalities in the country as of 2004. At last count Brazil had 5,561 municipalities so this might have changed at the time of this writing.

== See also ==
- List of municipalities in Minas Gerais
