= Veredinha =

Brazilian municipality

Coordinates: 17°23′56″S 42°44′09″W

- Municipality
- Coat of arms

- Location in Minas Gerais

- Location in Brazil
- Country: Brazil
- Region: Southeast
- State: Minas Gerais
- Intermediate Geographic Region: Teófilo Otoni
- Immediate Geographic Region: Capelinha

Area
  - Total: 631.691 km^{2} (243.897 sq mi)

Population (2022)
  - Total: 5,181
  - Density: 8.2/km^{2} (21/sq mi)
- Demonym: veredinhense
- Time zone: UTC−3 (BRT)
- Website: veredinha.mg.gov.br

Veredinha is a municipality in the northeast of the Brazilian state of Minas Gerais. As of 2020 the population was 5,727 in a total area of 635 km^{2} (245 sq mi). The elevation of the urban area is 635 meters. It is part of the IBGE statistical meso-region of Jequitinhonha and the micro-region of Capelinha. It became a municipality in 1995.

== Geography ==
Neighboring municipalities are: Turmalina, Itamarandiba, Carbonita, Minas Novas and Capelinha. The distance to Belo Horizonte is 496 km.

== Economy and infrastructure ==
The economy is based on cattle raising, services, and subsistence agriculture, with the main crops being coffee, rice, beans, sugarcane, and corn. There were plantations of eucalyptus trees for charcoal production. In 2005 there were 667 rural producers but only 10 tractors. 1,900 persons were dependent on agriculture. As of 2005 there were 4 public health clinics, with none of them carrying out diagnosis and complete therapy. There were no hospitals. Educational needs were met by 7 primary schools, 2 middle schools and 2 nursery schools. There were 192 automobiles in 2006, giving a ratio of 28 inhabitants per automobile (there were 428 motorcycles). There were no banks in 2007.

Veredinha is ranked low on the MHDI and was one of the poorest municipalities in the state and in the country in 2000.

== See also ==
- List of municipalities in Minas Gerais
