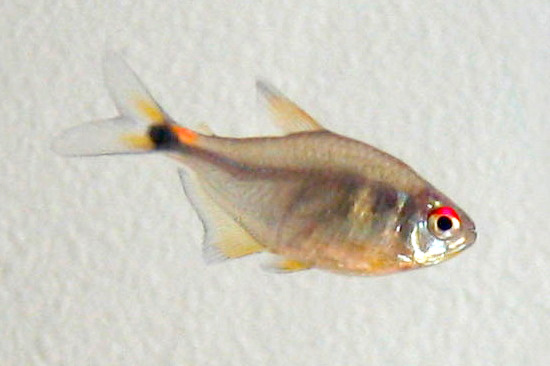
- Head-and-taillight tetra (Holopristis ocellifera)

Scientific classification
- Kingdom: Animalia
- Phylum: Chordata
- Class: Actinopterygii
- Order: Characiformes
- Family: Acestrorhamphidae
- Subfamily: Thayeriinae
- Genus: Holopristis; C. H. Eigenmann, 1903

Type species
- Tetragonopterus ocellifer Steindachner, 1882

= Holopristis =

Genus of fish

Holopristis is a genus of freshwater ray-finned fishes belonging to the family Acestrorhamphidae, the American characins. The fishes in this genus are found in South America.

Holopristis was first erected as a genus by Carl H. Eigenmann in 1903, where it was noted to be related to Hemigrammus and distinguished by its dentition. The chosen name was created from ὅλος (hólos) "entire" and πρίστης (prístēs) meaning "sawyer", the profession (one who saws, not a surname), and alludes to the teeth of the new type being present all along the jaw.

The name was then relegated to a synonym of Hemigrammus and was only revalidated in 2024, though this new system has yet to find wide acceptance.

== Species ==
Holopristis contains the following valid species:

- Holopristis aguaruna (F. C. T. Lima, Correa & Ota, 2016)
- Holopristis falsa (Meinken, 1958)
- Holopristis guyanensis (Géry, 1959)
- Holopristis haraldi (Géry, 1961)
- Holopristis luelingi (Géry, 1964)
- Holopristis neptunus (Zarske & Géry, 2002)
- Holopristis ocellifera (Steindachner, 1882) (head-and-taillight tetra)
- Holopristis pulchra (Ladiges, 1938) (garnet tetra)
- Holopristis yinyang (F. C. T. Lima & Sousa, 2009)
