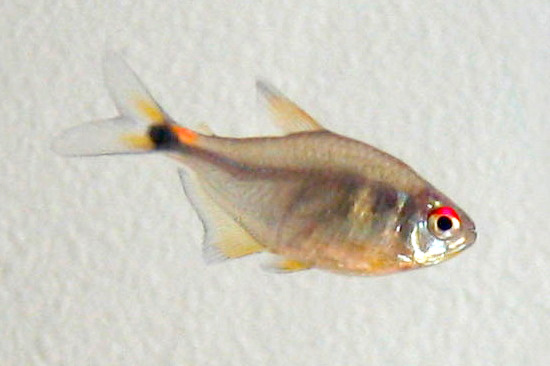

Conservation status
- Least Concern (IUCN 3.1)

Scientific classification
- Kingdom: Animalia
- Phylum: Chordata
- Class: Actinopterygii
- Order: Characiformes
- Family: Acestrorhamphidae
- Genus: Holopristis
- Species: H. ocellifera

Binomial name
- Holopristis ocellifera (Steindachner, 1882)

Synonyms
- Tetragonopterus ocellifer Steindachner, 1882; Hemigrammus ocellifer (Steindachner, 1882)

= Head-and-taillight tetra =

Species of fish

The head-and-tail light tetra (Holopristis ocellifer), also called the beacon fish or beacon tetra, is a species of freshwater ray-finned fish belonging to the family Acestrorhamphidae, the American characins. This species is found in South America. It is a popular species in the aquarium hobby.

== Taxonomy ==
The head-and-taillight tetra was first formally described as Tetragonopterus ocellifer in 1882 by the Austrian ichthyologist Franz Steindachner, with its type locality given as Villa Bella and Cudajas in Brazil. In 1903 Carl H. Eigenmann proposed the new monospecific genus Holopristis with Tetragonopterus ocellifer as its only species, as well as being designated as its type species. This genus is classified in the subfamily Thayeriinae of the American characin family Acestrorhamphidae. This family is classified within the suborder Characoidei of the order Characiformes.

== Etymology ==
The head-and-taillight tetra is the type species of the genus Holopristis. This name combines holo, which means "all" or "whole", with pristis, meaning "sawyer"; this probably alluudes to this species having teeth along the whole margin of the maxilla. The specific name, ocellifera, means "bearing an eye-spot or ocellus"; this may be an allusion to eye-like spot on the base of the caudal fin.

== Description ==
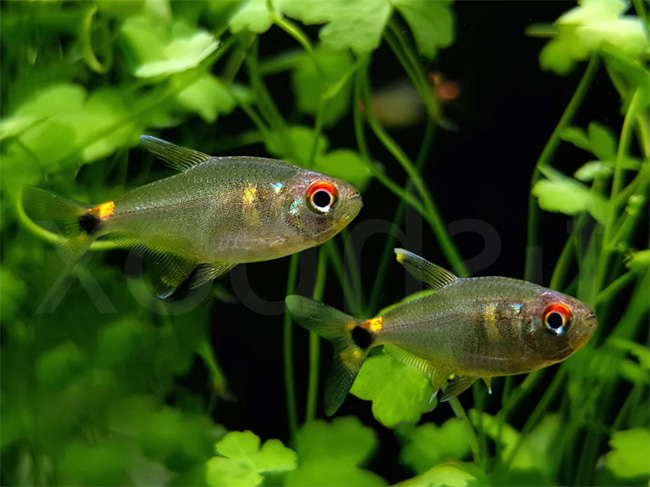
A pair of head-and-taillight tetras

The head-and-taillight tetra has a maximum total length of 4.9 cm (1.9 in). The overall colour of this species is a translucent silver. There is a dark line that extends over half the body. There are two iridescent copper coloured spots, one behind the eye and the other at the base of the caudal fin.

== Distribution and habitat ==
The head-and-taillight tetra is found in South America, where it has a wide distribution across the Amazon basin in Brazil, Colombia, Ecuador and Peru, as well as in the river systems of French Guiana, Guyana and Suriname. This species is found in large clear water tributaries, occasionally in blackwater streams.

== Utilisation ==
The head-and-taillight tetra is relatively easy to care for, peaceful, easy to breed and hardy, making it a popular species in the aquarium hobby. Most of the fish available in the aquarium trade in Europe are captive bred, typically in Eastern Europe.
