= Grão Mogol State Park =

State park in Minas Gerais, Brazil

- Parque Estadual de Grão Mogol
- IUCN category II (national park)
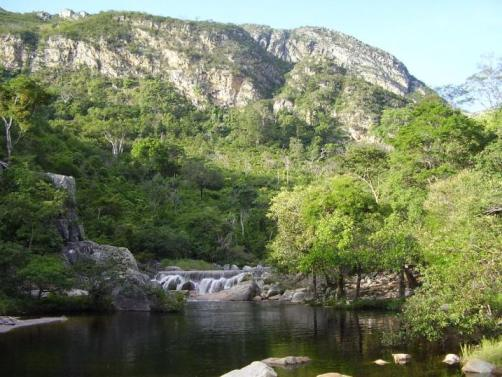
- River in the park

- Location within Brazil
- Nearest city: Grão Mogol, Minas Gerais
- Coordinates: 16°24′27″S 42°50′10″W
- Area: 28,404 ha (109.67 sq mi)
- Designation: State park
- Created: 1998
- Administrator: Instituto Estadual de Florestas

The Grão Mogol State Park (Portuguese: Parque Estadual de Grão Mogol) is a state park in the state of Minas Gerais, Brazil. It protects an area of high, mountainous terrain with cerrado vegetation, important as a source of water in a region with a dry climate.

== Location ==
The Grão Mogol State Park is in the municipality of Grão Mogol, Minas Gerais. It has an area of 28,404 hectares (70,190 acres). The park is mostly within the Serra Geral, in the region known as the Serra da Bocaína. It contains the valley of the Bosque River and other smaller streams within the Jequitinhonha River basin. The rivers are perennial, although the climate is very dry. The terrain is mostly mountainous, with large plateaus such as the 5,000-metre (16,000 ft) Chapada do Bosque, the Chapada do Bosquinho and the Chapada do Cardoso.

== History ==
The Grão Mogol State Park was created by decree 39.906 of 22 September 1998. Its area was redefined by decree 45.243 of 2009. It is classed as IUCN protected area category II (national park). The purpose is to protect regional fauna, flora and sources of rivers and streams in the region, to support research and scientific studies, and to provide alternatives for rational use of natural resources, such as ecological tourism. As of 2015 it was open only for scheduled educational and research visits, but was expected to soon open to the general public.

== Environment ==
Trees are mostly small and low, typical of high altitude fields. Forms of cerrado dominate the plateaus, particularly low cerrado with trees such as Caryocar brasiliense, Curatella americana and Qualea parviflora, and shrubby caatinga with Bromeliaceae and cactus. The valleys contain distinctive vegetation such as Vellozia squamata and isolated patches of Mauritia flexuosa. Fauna includes endangered species such as the maned wolf (Chrysocyon brachyurus), cougar (Puma concolor), ocelot (Leopardus pardalis), giant anteater (Myrmecophaga tridactyla), southern tamandua (Tamandua tetradactyla), giant armadillo (Priodontes maximus), macaco sauá (a titi) and lontra.

== Attractions ==
The park contains a trail built by slaves in colonial times with stone paving. It links the Fazenda do Cafezal, owned by the Baron of Grão Mogol, to the town of Grão Mogol. Several sections are well preserved. Another attraction is the Curral de Pedras (Stone Corral).

== Sources ==
- Freitas, Juliana (11 February 2015), "Você conhece o Parque Estadual de Grão Mogol", Parque Estadual do Pau Furado (in Portuguese)
- Parque Estadual de Grão Mogol (in Portuguese), IEF: Instituto Estadual de Florestas, archived from the original on 2017-04-01
- Unidade de Conservação: Parque Estadual Grão Mogol (in Portuguese), MMA: Ministério do Meio Ambiente
