= Preto River (Araçuaí River tributary) =

River in Minas Gerais, Brazil

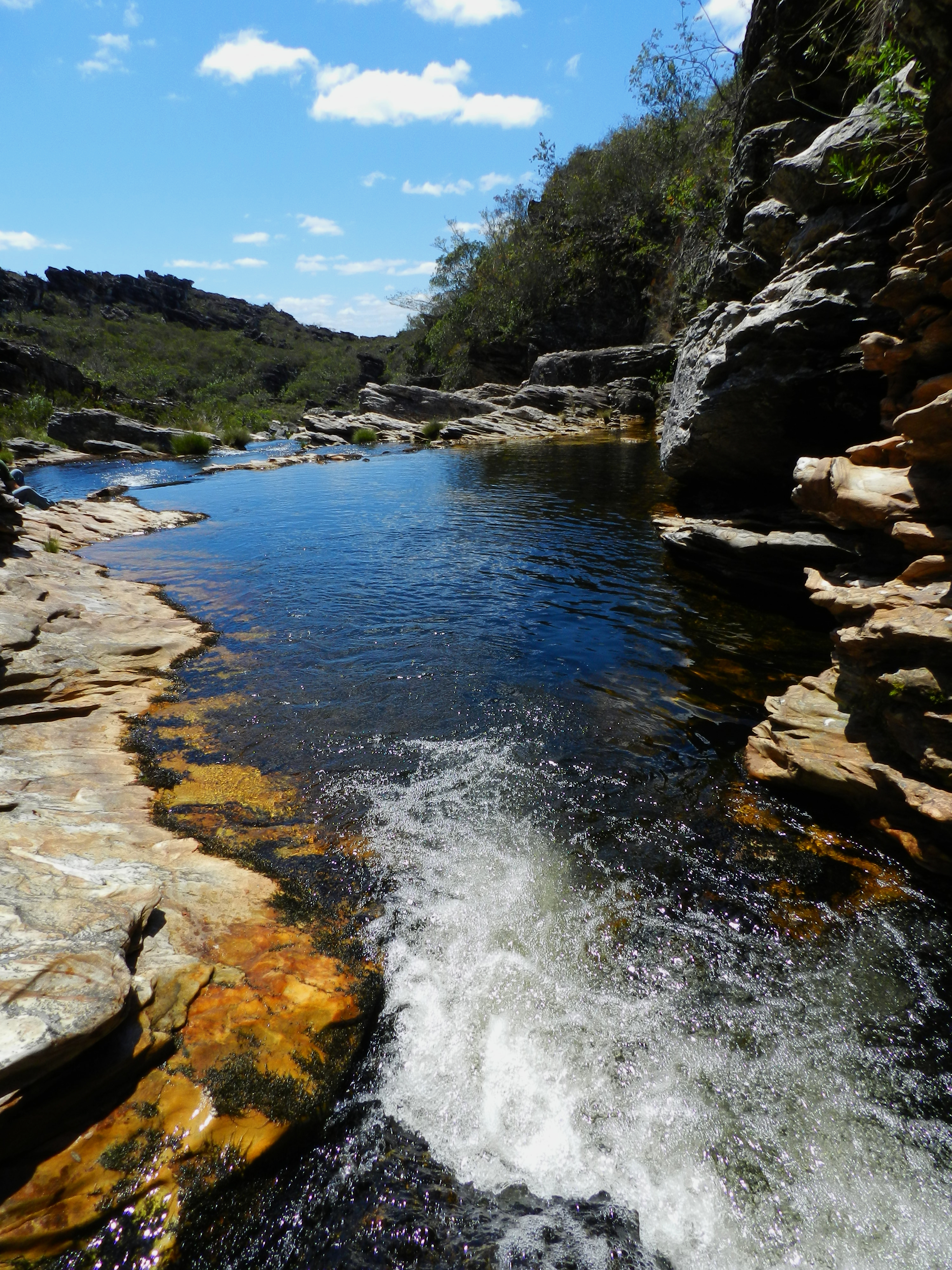
- Stretch of the upper river

- Mouth location in Brazil
- Native name: Rio Preto (Portuguese)

Location
- Country: Brazil

Physical characteristics
- Source
  - location: Rio Preto State Park
- Mouth
  - coordinates: 17°51′10″S 43°14′05″W

Basin features
- River system: Araçuaí River

The Preto River (Portuguese: Rio Preto: Black River) is a river in the state of Minas Gerais, Brazil. It is a tributary of the Araçuaí River.

The Rio Preto was declared a "permanently protected river" in 1991 in response to demand from the local community. The Rio Preto State Park, which protects the river's sources, was created by decree 35.611 of 1 June 1994, with an area of 10,755 hectares (26,580 acres).

== See also ==
- List of rivers of Minas Gerais
