= Minas Novas =

Brazilian city

Coordinates: 17°13′08″S 42°35′24″W

- Municipality
- Municipality of Minas Novas
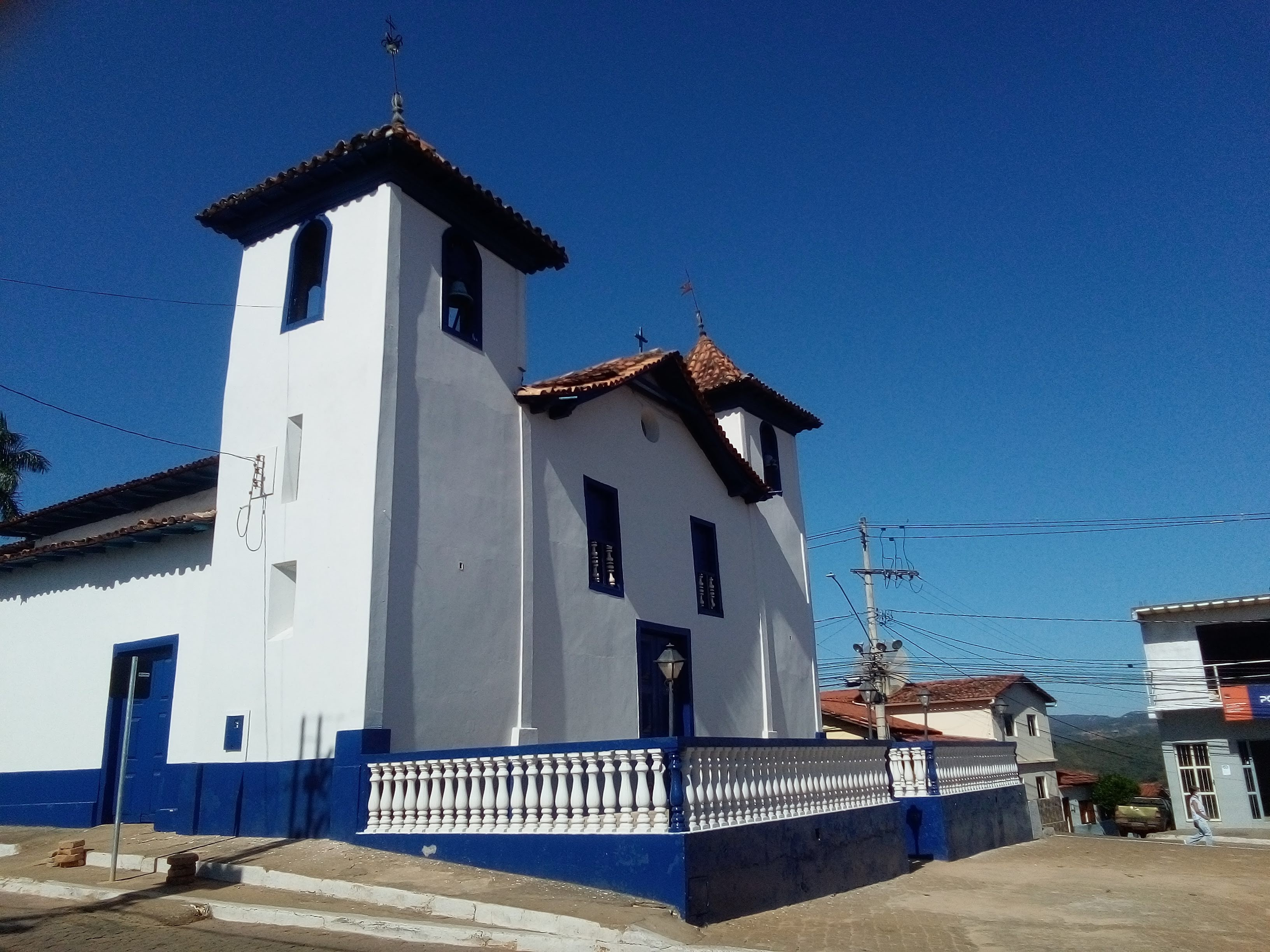
- Church of Our Lady of the Rosary

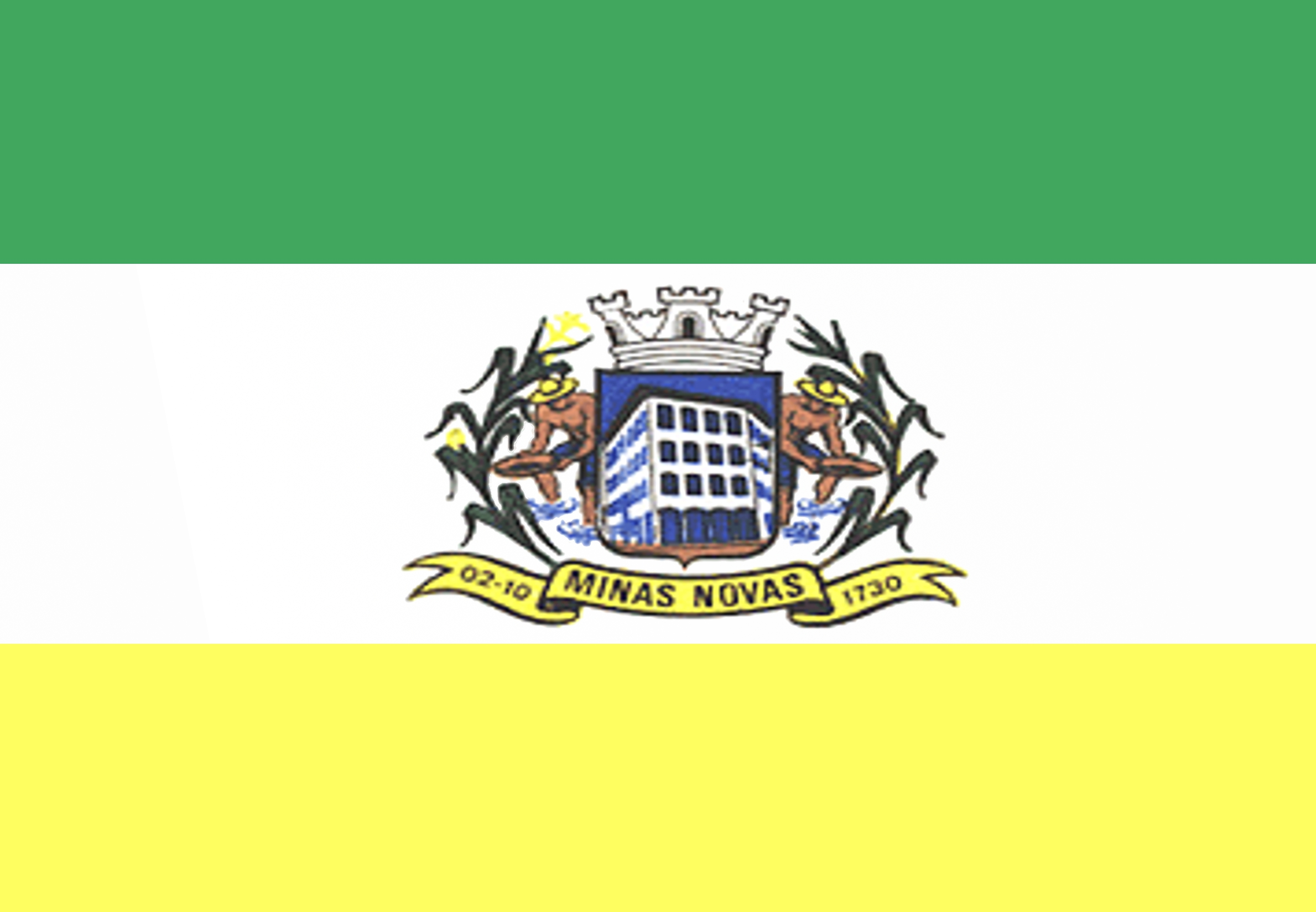
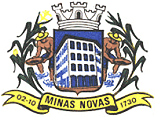
- Flag Coat of arms

- Country: Brazil
- State: Minas Gerais
- Region: Southeast
- Intermediate Region: Teófilo Otoni
- Immediate Region: Capelinha
- Incorporated: 2 October 1730

Government
  - Mayor: Aécio Guedes Soares (Republicanos)

Area
  - Total: 1,810.772 km^{2} (699.143 sq mi)

Population (2020)
  - Total: 31,497
  - Density: 17.394/km^{2} (45.051/sq mi)
- Demonym: minas-novense
- Time zone: UTC−3 (BRT)
- Postal Code: 39650-000
- Area code(s): +55 33
- HDI (2010): 0.633 – medium
- Website: minasnovas.mg.gov.br

Minas Novas is a municipality in the northeast of the Brazilian state of Minas Gerais. In 2020, the population was 31,497 in a total area of 1,810 km^{2} (700 sq mi). The elevation of the urban area is 635 meters. It is part of the IBGE statistical meso-region of Jequitinhonha and the micro-region of Capelinha. It became a municipality in 1730.

Neighboring municipalities are Capelinha, Chapada do Norte, Leme do Prado, Novo Cruzeiro, Setubinha, Turmalina and Virgem da Lapa. The distance to Belo Horizonte is 500 km.

== History ==
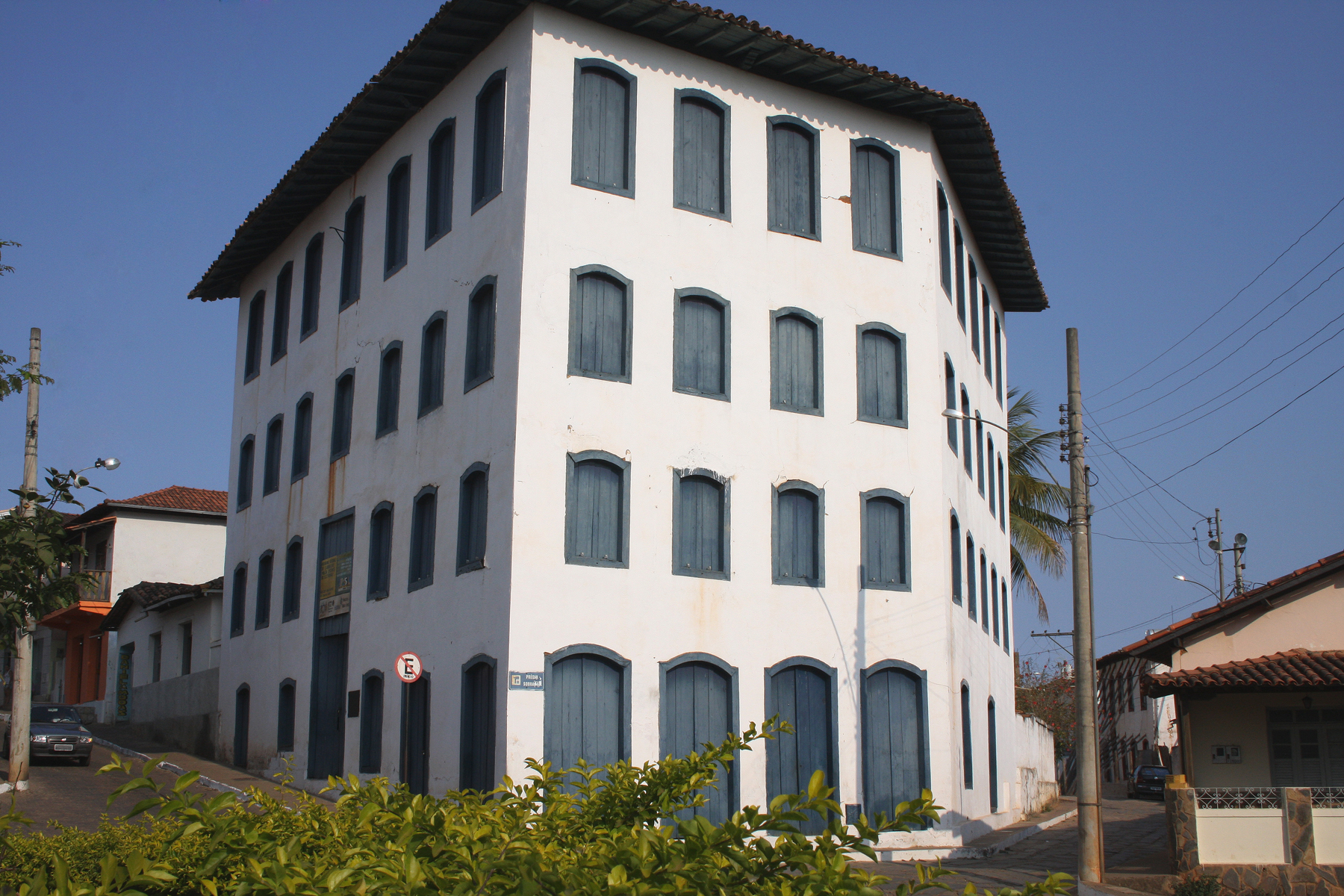
The Sobradão of Minas Novas, an example of a Brazilian sobrado, was built in 1821.

The municipality of Minas Novas, which at the beginning of its history was called Arraial das Lavras Novas dos Campos de São Pedro do Fanado, was discovered and founded by the bandeirante Sebastião Leme do Prado. He came in search of gold, which was found in abundance in the village. Leaving the region of Rio Manso near Diamantina due to an epidemic and also looking for the Araçuaí River and the Itamarandiba River, Sebastião Leme do Prado, along with other paulistas, came across the Fanado River due to a route error and later the Bom Sucesso stream.

The news of the gold spread throughout the hinterland and in a short time a settlement had formed in the region. The settlement was elevated to the status of a town on October 2, 1730, receiving the name Vila de Nossa Senhora do Bom Sucesso das Minas Novas da Contagem.

Created as a village in Vila do Príncipe (today the municipality of Serro), Minas Novas belonged to the territory of Bahia until September 28, 1760. It once again became part of the captaincy of Minas Gerais, under the jurisdiction of the Ouvidor of Serro Frio Comarca but remained ecclesiastically linked to the Diocese of Jacobina, in Bahia. By the provincial decree of March 9, 1840, it was elevated to the category of municipality with the name of Minas Novas.

It was the largest municipality, in terms of area, in the state of Minas Gerais. From the former municipality, 65 of the 853 municipalities in Minas Gerais today were created.

== Geography ==
The municipality is located in the Immediate Geographic Region of Capelinha, which is part of the Intermediate Geographic Region of Teófilo Otoni. It belongs to the Microregion of Capelinha and the Mesoregion of Jequitinhonha. Its population censused in 2022 was 24,405 inhabitants.

=== Hydrography ===
The main rivers in Minas Novas are the Fanado River, which flows through the city and is responsible for its water supply; the Araçuaí River, which flows through the municipality to the west and receives water from the Fanado River; the Capivari River, a river that originates within the municipality; and the Setubal River, a river that cuts through the municipality to the east and flows into the Araçuaí River.

== Culture ==
An important religious festival takes place in June, celebrating the Virgin of the Rosary, organized by the Black Folk Brotherhood of Our Lady of the Rosary. There is a strong African influence in the dances and costumes since this was a place that was mainly settled by slaves and later ex-slaves. The city's architectural heritage is extensive and consists of old buildings, among which the Sobradão stands out, a construction from 1821, made of wattle and daub, in the Baroque style and four floors. Other important buildings are the Chapels of Saint Joseph and Saint Gundisalvus and the Churches of Saint Francis and Rosary.

== See also ==
- List of municipalities in Minas Gerais
