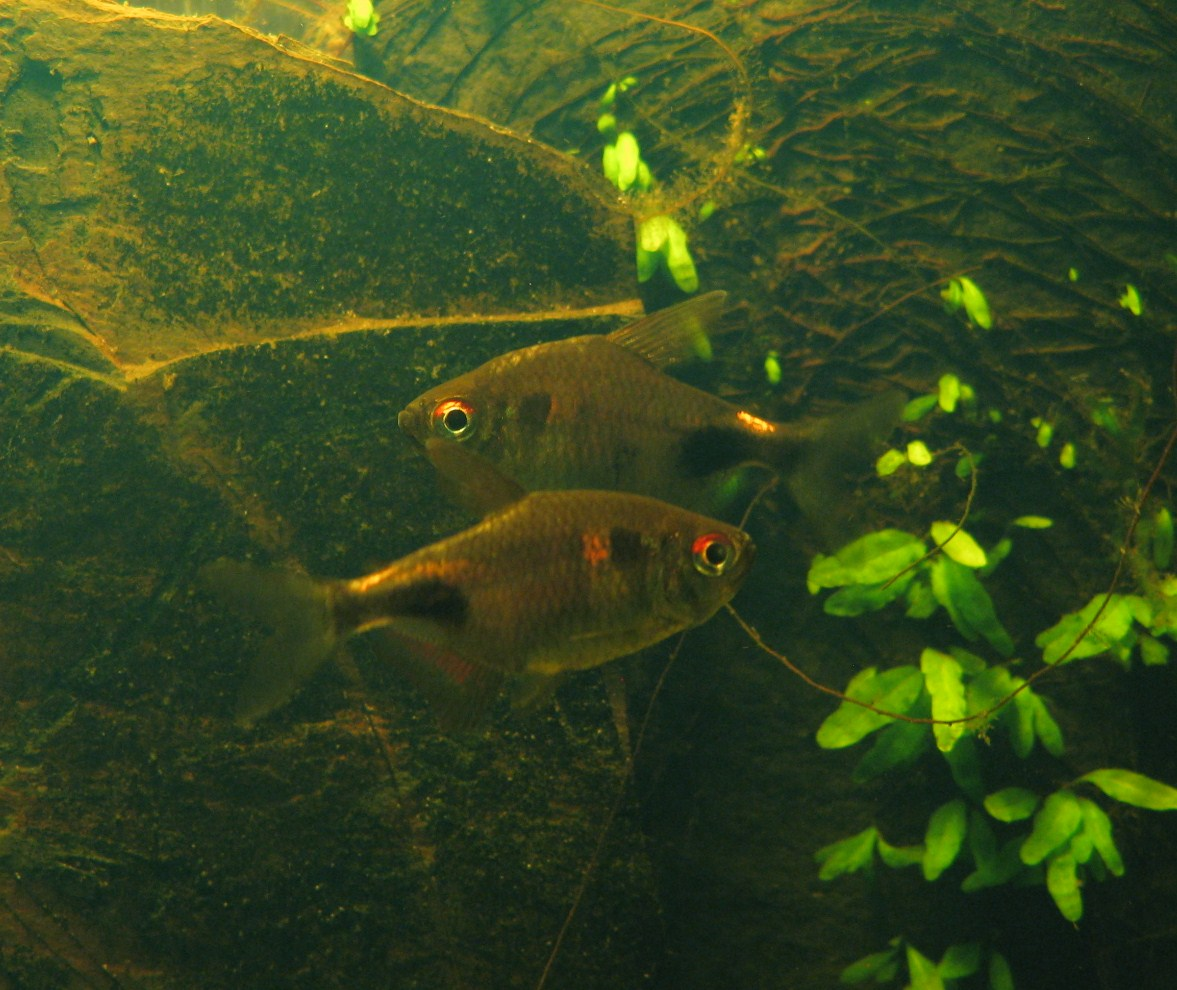

Conservation status
- Least Concern (IUCN 3.1)

Scientific classification
- Kingdom: Animalia
- Phylum: Chordata
- Class: Actinopterygii
- Order: Characiformes
- Family: Acestrorhamphidae
- Genus: Holopristis
- Species: H. pulcher

Binomial name
- Holopristis pulcher (Ladiges, 1938)

Synonyms
- Hemigrammus pulcher Ladiges, 1938

= Holopristis pulchra =

Species of fish

Holopristis pulcher, the pretty tetra, garnet tetra or black wedge tetra, is a species of freshwater ray-finned fish belonging to the family Acestrorhamphidae. In the wild, the species is found near Iquitos in the Peruvian Amazon, and probably also in Brazil and Colombia.

== Physical appearance ==
Holopristis pulcher has a pale-lemon background color with a black area on the flanks, up to the caudal peduncle. Under subdued lighting, H. pulcher's body appears iridescent. It grows up to 4 cm (1.6 in).

Males can be distinguished from females through the shape of the swim bladder, which can be seen through the fish's semi-transparent body. In males, the swim bladder is pointed, while in females, the swim bladder is rounded.

== In captivity ==
Aquarists keep this fish in water with temperatures ranging from 23 to 27 °C (73 to 81 °F) that is soft (50–100 mg/L) and acidic (pH 6.0). The fish is reported to be peaceful and social.

Aquarists recommend that it be fed prepared foods and small live foods.

Breeding is difficult, as parents must be prevented from eating their own eggs. Eggs usually hatch within 20–24 hours.

The H. pulcher does best in groups of six or more.
