= Guanhães =

Coordinates: 18°47′S 42°57′W

- Municipality
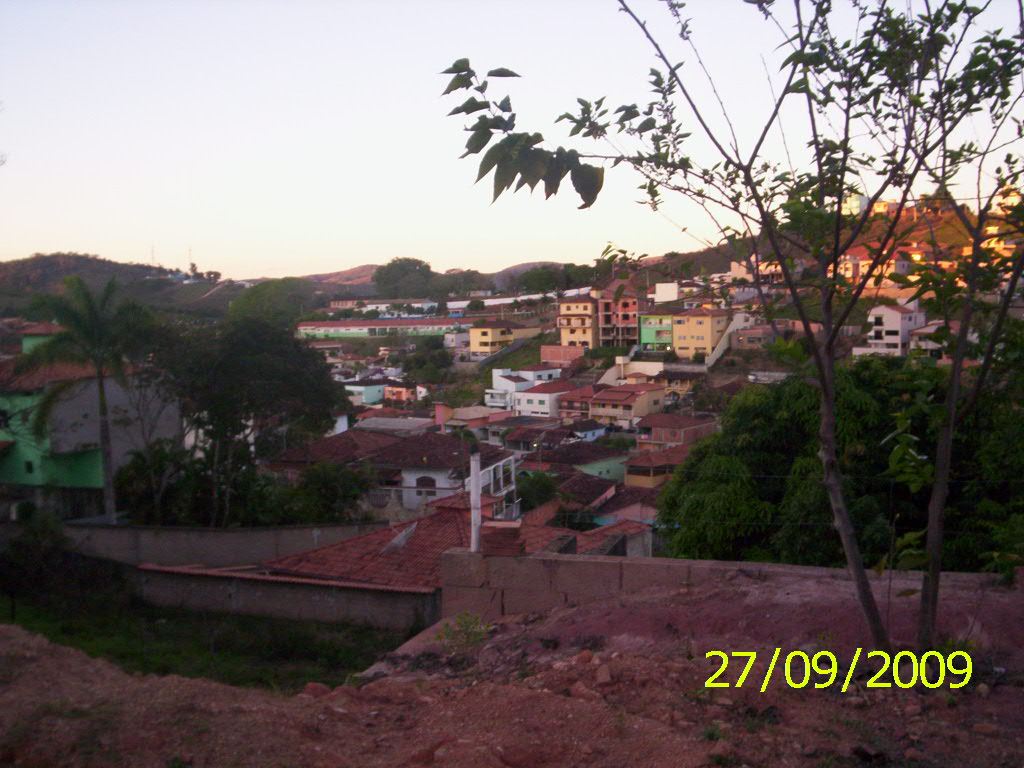

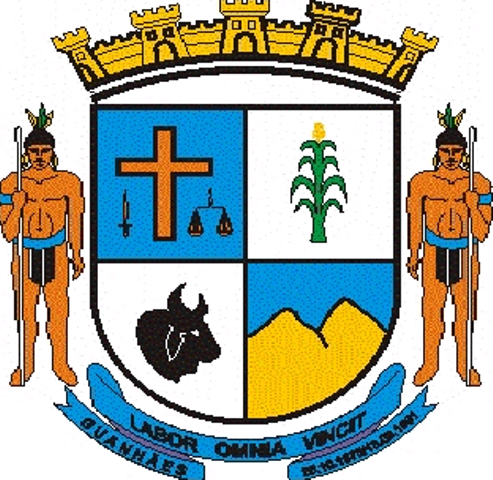
- Flag Coat of arms
- Interactive map of Guanhães
- Country: Brazil
- Region: Southeast
- State: Minas Gerais
- Mesoregion: Vale do Rio Doce

Population (2022 Census --------------->)
  - Total: 32,244
  - Estimate (2025): 33,517
- Time zone: UTC−3 (BRT)

Guanhães is a municipality in the state of Minas Gerais in the Southeast region of Brazil.

== See also ==
- List of municipalities in Minas Gerais
