= São Sebastião do Maranhão =

- Municipality
- Location in Brazil
- Coordinates: 18°5′2″S 42°34′15″W
- Country: Brazil
- Region: Southeast
- State: Minas Gerais
- Mesoregion: Vale do Rio Doce

Population (2022 Census)
  - Total: 10,079
  - Estimate (2025): 10,218
- Time zone: UTC−3 (BRT)

São Sebastião do Maranhão is a municipality in the state of Minas Gerais in the Southeast region of Brazil.

== See also ==
- List of municipalities in Minas Gerais
