= Água Boa, Minas Gerais =

City in the Brazilian state of Minas Gerais

Coordinates: 17°59′46″S 42°23′27″W

Água Boa
- Municipality
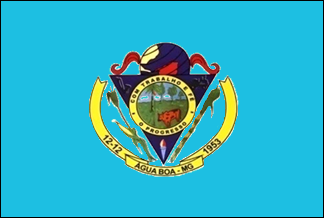
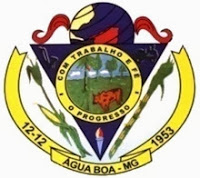
- Flag Coat of arms

- Location in Minas Gerais

- Location in Brazil
- Country: Brazil
- Region: Southeast
- State: Minas Gerais
- Intermediate Geographic Region: Teófilo Otoni
- Immediate Geographic Region: Capelinha

Area
  - Total: 1,320.344 km^{2} (509.788 sq mi)

Population (2022)
  - Total: 12,589
  - Density: 9.53/km^{2} (24.7/sq mi)
- Demonym: água-boense
- Time zone: UTC−3 (BRT)
- Website: www.aguaboa.mg.gov.br

Água Boa is a city in the Brazilian state of Minas Gerais. In 2020 its population was estimated to be 13,523.

The city of Água Boa is around 380 km from the state capital Belo Horizonte and the principal economic activity is the growing of cereal crops, the most important of which is corn, and livestock production, as the soil is favorable for free-range cattle.

== See also ==
- List of municipalities in Minas Gerais
