= São João Evangelista =

- Municipality

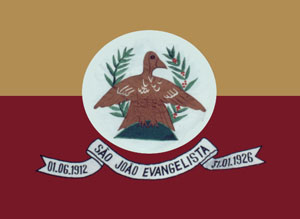
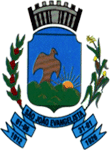
- Flag Coat of arms

- Location in Minas Gerais

- Location in Brazil
- Coordinates: 18°32′52″S 42°45′46″W
- Country: Brazil
- Region: Southeast
- State: Minas Gerais
- Mesoregion: Doce River valley
- Microregion: Guanhães
- Incorporated (municipality): June 1, 1926

Area
  - Total: 184.627 sq mi (478.183 km^{2})
- Elevation: 2,260 ft (689 m)

Population (2022 Census)
  - Total: 15,315
  - Estimate (2025): 15,613
  - Density: 84.3/sq mi (32.53/km^{2})
- Demonym: Evangelistano
- Time zone: UTC−3 (BRT)
- CEP postal code: 39705-000
- Area code: +55 33
- HDI (2010): 0,638
- Website: Municipality official website

São João Evangelista is a municipality in the state of Minas Gerais in the Southeast region of Brazil.

== See also ==
- List of municipalities in Minas Gerais
