= Grão Mogol =

Coordinates: 16°34′S 42°54′W

- Municipality
- Municipality of Grão Mogol
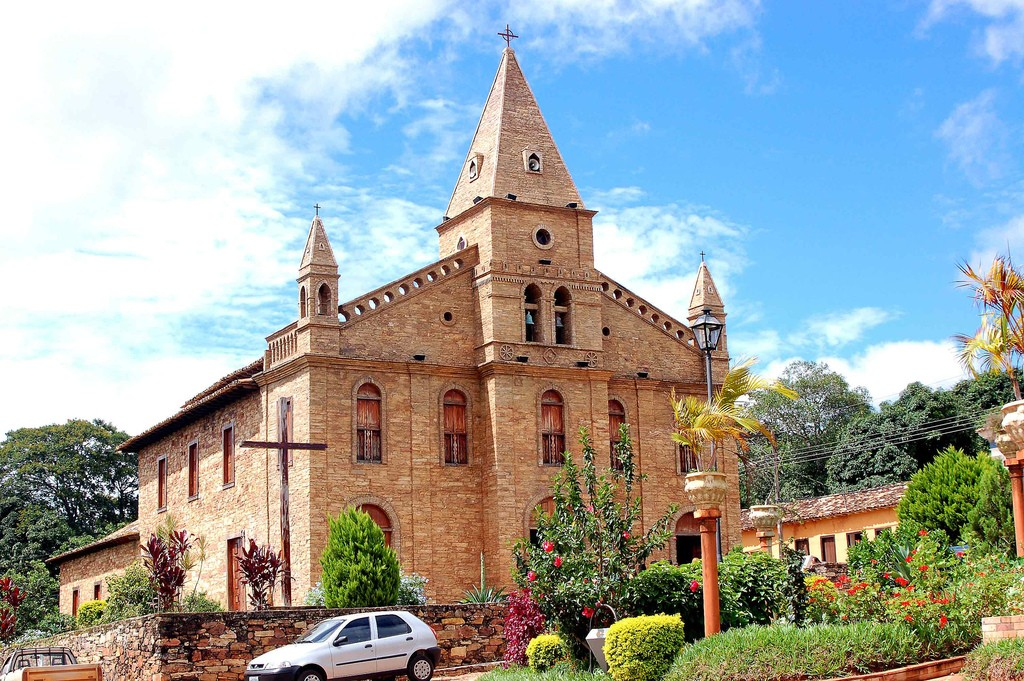

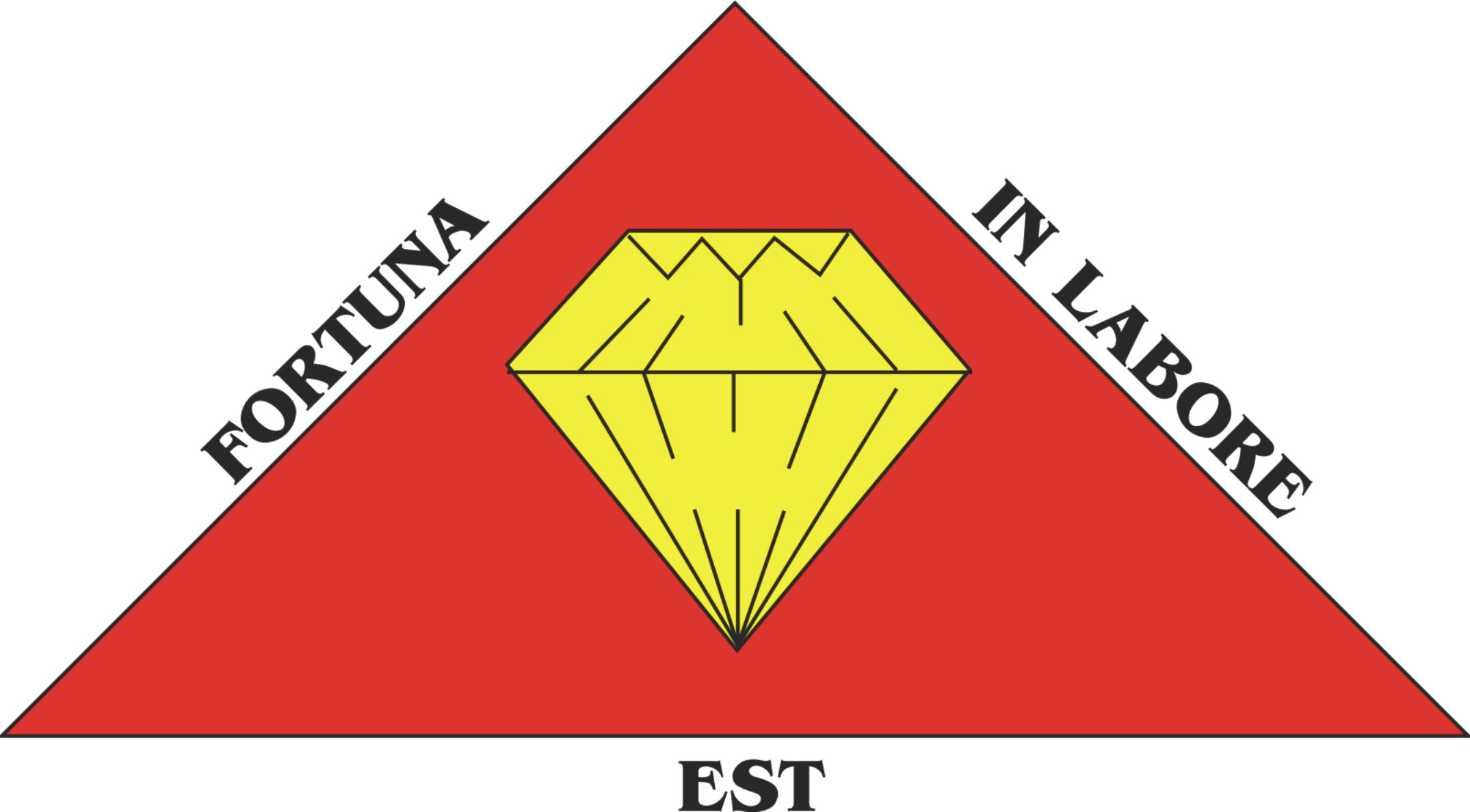
- Flag

- Location in Minas Gerais
- Country: Brazil
- State: Minas Gerais
- Region: Southeast
- Intermediate Region: Montes Claros
- Immediate Region: Montes Claros
- Founded: 1840

Government
  - Mayor: Diêgo Antônio Braga Fagundes (PTB)

Area
  - Total: 3,885.294 km^{2} (1,500.120 sq mi)
- Elevation: 829 m (2,720 ft)

Population (2021)
  - Total: 15,943
  - Density: 4.1034/km^{2} (10.628/sq mi)
- Demonym: grão-mogolense
- Time zone: UTC−3 (BRT)
- Postal Code: 39570-000 to 39572-999
- HDI (2010): 0.604 – medium
- Website: graomogol.mg.gov.br

Grão Mogol is a Brazilian municipality located in the north of the state of Minas Gerais. In 2020 the population was 15,890 in a total area of 3,890 km^{2}. The elevation is 829 meters. It became a municipality in 1840.

== Geography ==
Grão Mogol is located in an isolated area between Montes Claros and the Jequitinhonha River. The distance to the state capital, Belo Horizonte, is 551 km. Other distances are: Brasília, 930; Montes Claros, 157; Rio de Janeiro, 1,080; Salvador, 894; and São Paulo, 1,215.

Grão Mogol is also an IBGE statistical microregion including the following municipalities: Botumirim, Cristália, Grão Mogol, Itacambira, Josenópolis, and Padre Carvalho. The population of this region was 39,406 in 2000 and the area was 9,108.00 km^{2}.

== History ==
The settlement of Serra de Santo Antônio do Itacambiraçu, present-day Grão Mogol, had it origins in the discovery of diamonds at the end of the eighteenth century. In 1839 the place was called Arraial da Serra de Grão Mogol and soon began to attract people from all over the country including foreigners to search for diamonds.

The site began to be noticed by the Portuguese crown for its commerce of diamonds and soon the government took over the mining and the commercialization. In 1840 what was only a "arraial" was made a "Vila Provincial" and in the same year it became a district.

In 1858, Grão Mogol received the category of city. For decades, it was considered the most important city in the north of the state of Minas Gerais. When the diamonds ran out the city began to lose population, especially after 1960, coinciding with the loss of territory to form the municipalities of Itacambira, Cristália and Botumirim.

Today the colonial buildings and the popular traditions make Grão Mogol an important touristic attraction.

== Economic activities ==
The most important economic activities are cattle raising (19,000 head in 2006) and agriculture. The GDP in 2005 was R$50,489,000. The most important agricultural crops are bananas, coffee, tropical and citrus fruits, peanuts, rice, sugarcane, and corn. In the rural area there were 1,737 producers. The total area of agricultural land was 183,695 hectares in 2006. Pasture made up 56,000 ha. and 76,000 ha. were in woodland. In the urban area there was 1 banking agency in 2006.

== Health and education ==
This municipality is isolated from major population centers and suffers from drought and poor soils.

- Municipal Human Development Index: .672 (2000)
- State ranking: 666 out of 853 municipalities as of 2000
- National ranking: 3,419 out of 5,138 municipalities as of 2000

- Degree of urbanization: 33.96% (2000)
- Infant mortality rate: 21.01 (2000) The rate for Minas Gerais was 17.40; the rate for Brazil was 18.91.
- Illiteracy rate: 29.03% (15 years old or older)(Data from 2000) The rate for Minas Gerais was 11.96; the rate for Brazil was 13.63
- Urban area covered by sewage system: 66.00%--the rate for Minas Gerais was 81.39%
- Health clinics, health centers, and hospitals: 3, 4, 1 with 56 beds

== Tourism ==
Besides the old historical buildings of the town there is an interesting church, Igreja Matriz de Santo Antônio, built in the nineteenth century by slaves for the white population. In the rural area there are many natural attractions to please the visitor. The most important is the Canyon do Extrema, made up of deep pools of water and several waterfalls. The municipality contains the 28,404-hectare (70,190-acre) Grão Mogol State Park, created in 1998.

== See also ==
- List of municipalities in Minas Gerais
