= BR-120 (Brazil highway) =

Highway in Brazil

BR-120

Route information
- Length: 964.5 km (599.3 mi)

Major junctions
- North end: Araçuaí, Minas Gerais
- South end: Arraial do Cabo, Rio de Janeiro

Location
- Country: Brazil

Highway system
- Highways in Brazil; Federal

BR-120 is a federal highway of Brazil. The road connects the city of Araçuaí, in the state of Minas Gerais, to the city of Arraial do Cabo, in the state of Rio de Janeiro.
