= BR-367 (Brazil highway) =

Highway in Brazil

BR-367

Route information
- Length: 762.5 km (473.8 mi)

Major junctions
- northeast end: Santa Cruz Cabrália, Bahia
- southwest end: Gouveia, Minas Gerais

Location
- Country: Brazil

Highway system
- Highways in Brazil; Federal

BR-367 is a federal highway that begins in Santa Cruz Cabrália, Bahia and ends in Gouveia, Minas Gerais. The highway connects Porto Seguro in Bahia and Almenara and Araçuaí and Diamantina in Minas Gerais.
