= Capelinha =

- Municipality
- Município de Capelinha; Municipality of Capelinha
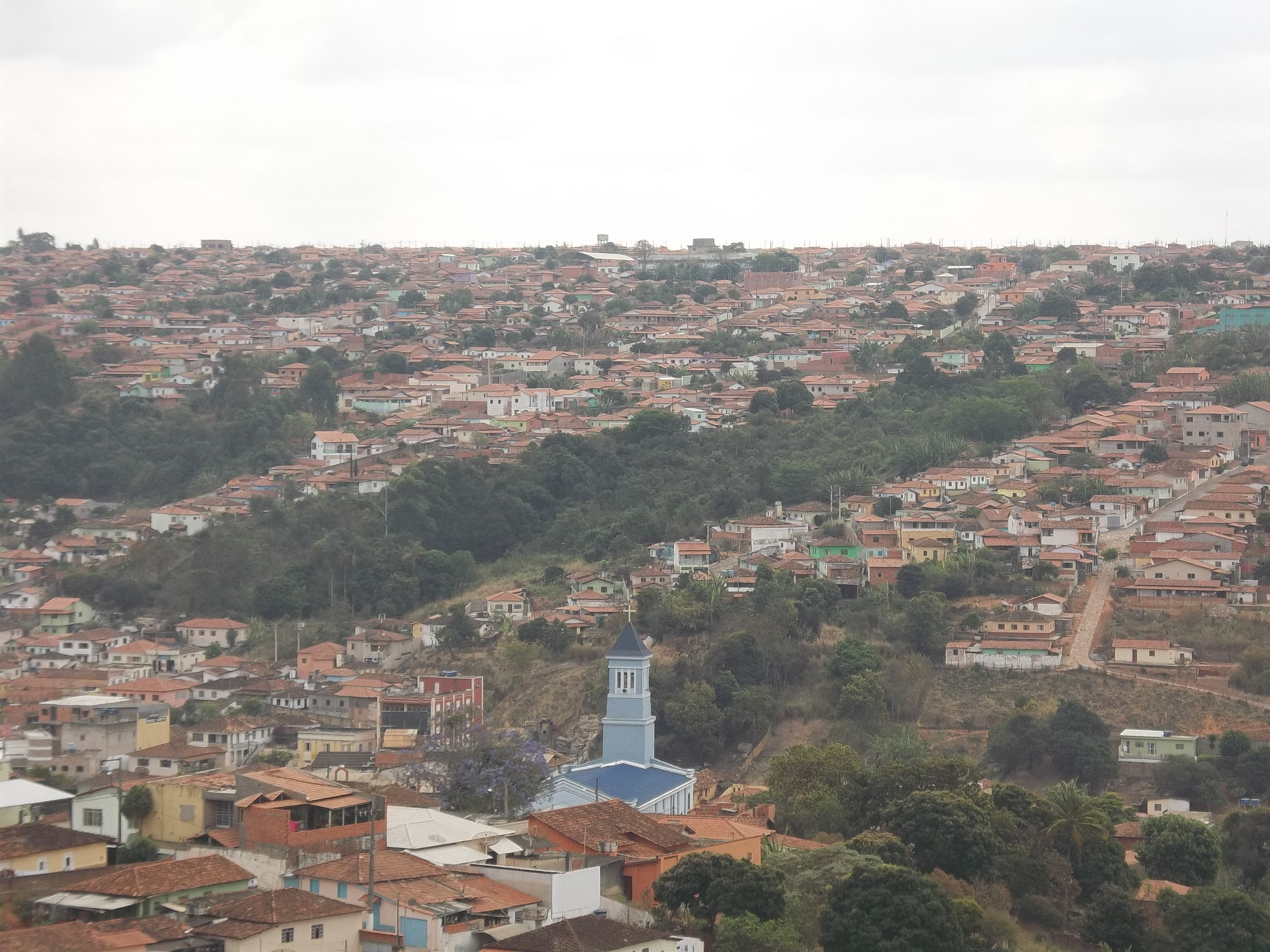
- Partial view of Capelinha

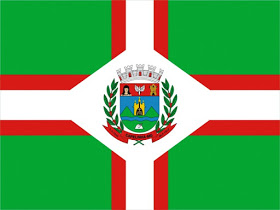
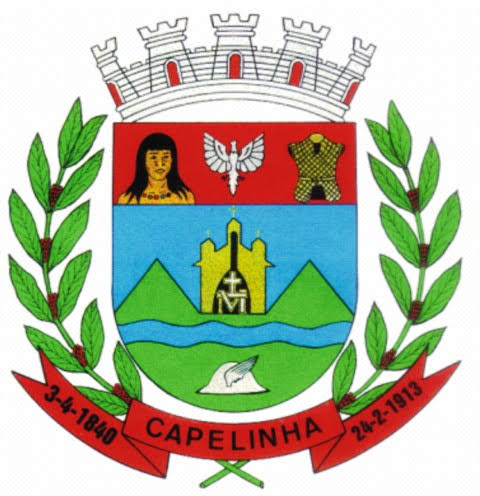
- Flag Coat of arms
- Nickname: Capela City

- Location in Brazil
- Coordinates: 17°41′27″S 42°30′57″W
- Country: Brazil
- Region: Southeast
- State: Minas Gerais
- Intermediate Geographic Region: Teófilo Otoni
- Immediate Geographic Region: Capelinha
- Founded: February 24, 1913

Government
  - Mayor: Zezinho da Vitalina (2013–2017)

Area
  - Total: 965.901 km^{2} (372.936 sq mi)
- Elevation: 900 m (3,000 ft)

Population (2020)
  - Total: 38,057(List of largest cities in Brazil)
- Demonym: Capelinhense
- Time zone: UTC−3 (BRT)
- Postal Code (CEP): 39680000
- Website: www.pmcapelinha.mg.gov.br

Capelinha is a Brazilian municipality located in the north-center of the state of Minas Gerais. Its population as of 2020 was 38,057 living in a total area of 966 km^{2} (373 sq mi). The city belongs to the statistical mesoregion of Jequitinhonha and to the statistical microregion of Capelinha. It became a municipality in 1913.

== Geography ==
Capelinha is located at an elevation of 1100 meters between the Itamarandiba and the Fanado Rivers, both of which flows north into the Jequitinhonha River. It is northeast of Diamantina and Itamarandiba. Highway access is made by the BR-381, MG-434, BR-120, and MG-129.

The distance to Diamantina is 176 km; Teófilo Otoni is 190 km; to Itamarandiba, 63; Km; and to Belo Horizonte, the state capital, 427 km. Neighboring municipalities are: Veredinha, Turmalina, Itamarandiba, Aricanduva, Minas Novas, Água Boa, Setubinha, and Angelândia.

== Economy ==
The main economic activities are services, agriculture, and small industries. The planting of eucalyptus for charcoal production is important and coffee cultivation has been increasing in recent years. The GDP in 2005 was R$141 million (US$57.92 million), with 83 million from services, 10 million from industry, and 40 million from agriculture. There were 1,344 rural producers on 40,000 hectares of land. Only 93 farms had tractors (2006). The main crops were eucalyptus, sugarcane, coffee (8,860 hectares), beans, and corn (1,900 hectares). There were 13,000 head of cattle (2006). In 2007 there were 3 banks.

== Social indicators ==
Capelinha is ranked in the bottom tier of municipalities in the state in human development.

- Municipal Human Development Index: 0.664 (2000)
- State ranking: 659 out of 853 municipalities as of 2000
- National ranking: 3400 out of 5,138 municipalities as of 2000
- Literacy rate: 73%
- Life expectancy: 66 (average of males and females)

In terms of HDI, the highest ranking municipality in Minas Gerais in 2000 was Poços de Caldas with 0.841, while the lowest was Setubinha with 0.568. Nationally the highest was São Caetano do Sul in São Paulo with 0.919, while the lowest was Setubinha. In more recent statistics (considering 5,507 municipalities) Manari in the state of Pernambuco has the lowest rating in the country—0,467—putting it in last place.

There were 17 health clinics and 1 hospital with 103 beds in 2005. Educational needs were met by 41 primary schools and 3 middle schools.

== See also ==
- List of municipalities in Minas Gerais
