= Turmalina =

- Municipality
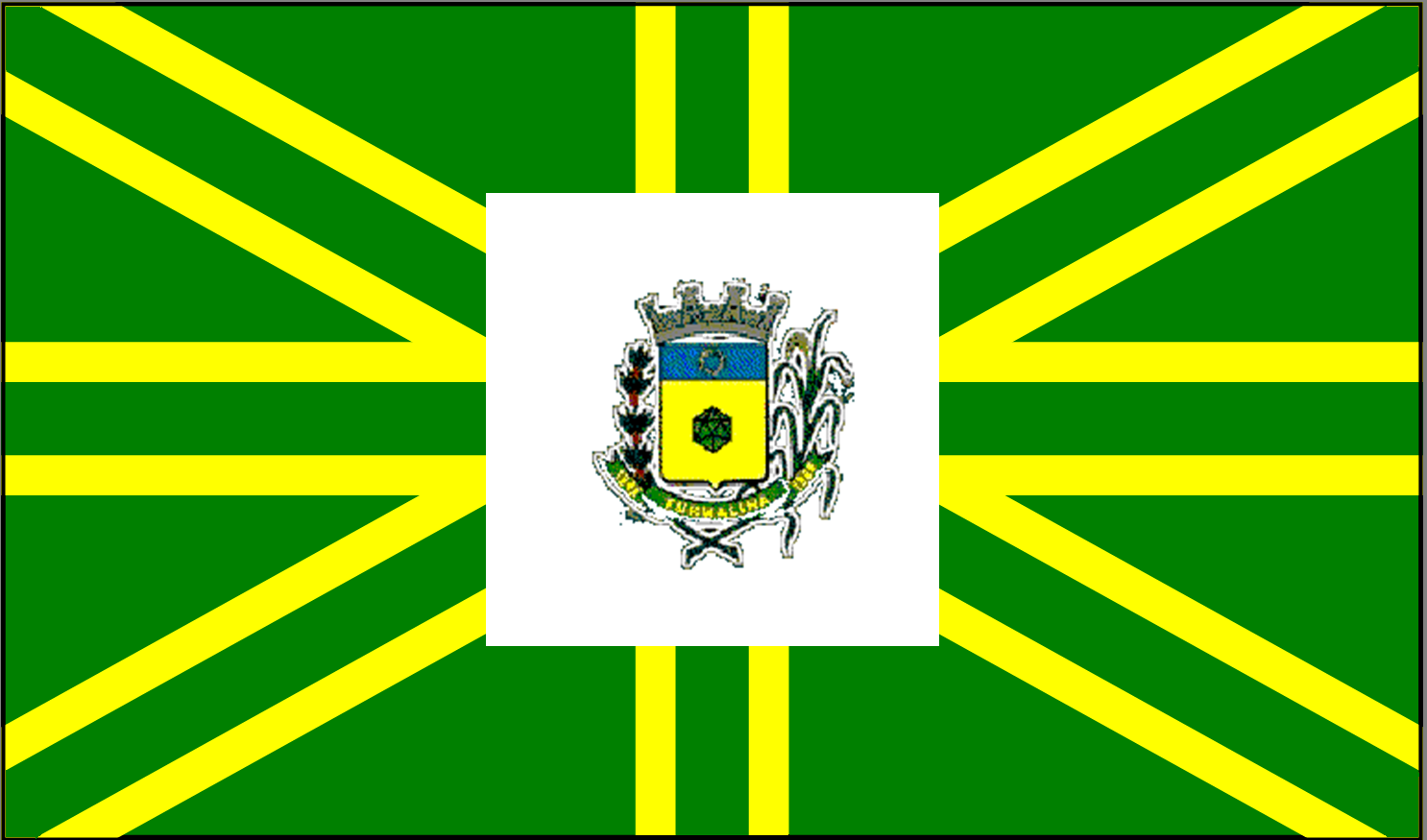
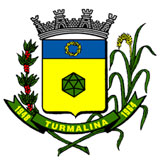
- Flag Coat of arms

- Location of Turmalina in the state of Sao Paulo

- Location within Brazil
- Coordinates: 20.051944°S 50.475833°W
- Country: Brazil
- State: São Paulo
- Municipality: Turmalina

Area
  - Total: 147.86 km^{2} (57.09 sq mi)
- Elevation: 467 m (1,532 ft)

Population (2020)
  - Total: 1,696
  - Density: 11.47/km^{2} (29.71/sq mi)
- Time zone: UTC−3 (BRT)

Turmalina is a municipality in the state of São Paulo in Brazil. The population in 2020 was 1,696 and the area is 147.86 square kilometres (57.09 sq mi). The elevation is 467 m.

The municipality contains part of the 5,192 hectares (12,830 acres) Acauã Ecological Station, a fully protected conservation unit created in 1974.

== Media ==
In telecommunications, the city was served by Companhia de Telecomunicações do Estado de São Paulo until 1973, when it began to be served by Telecomunicações de São Paulo. In July 1998, this company was acquired by Telefónica, which adopted the Vivo brand in 2012.

The company is currently an operator of cell phones, fixed lines, internet (fiber optics/4G) and television (satellite and cable).

== See also ==
- List of municipalities in São Paulo
- Interior of São Paulo
