= Itinga =

Municipality of MG, Brazil

Coordinates: 16°36′34″S 41°46′19″W

- Municipality
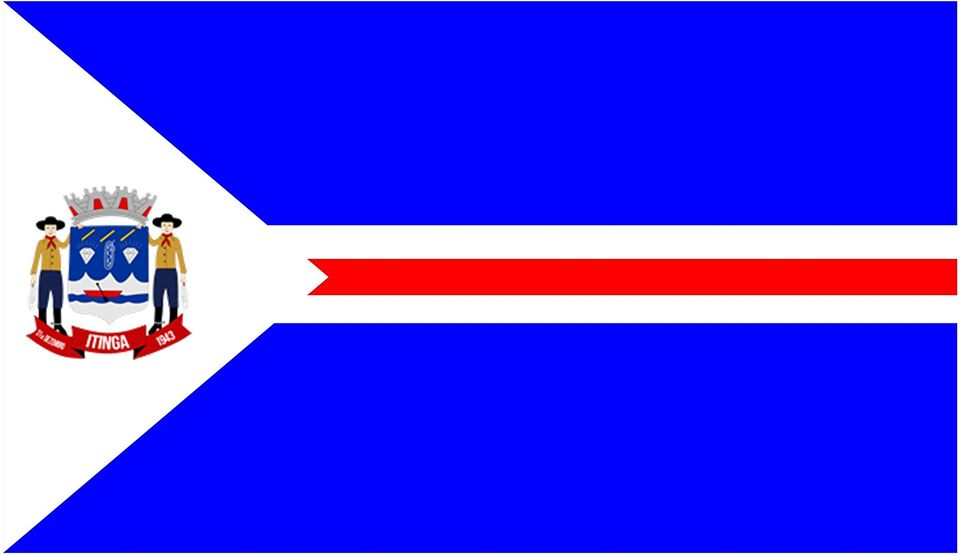
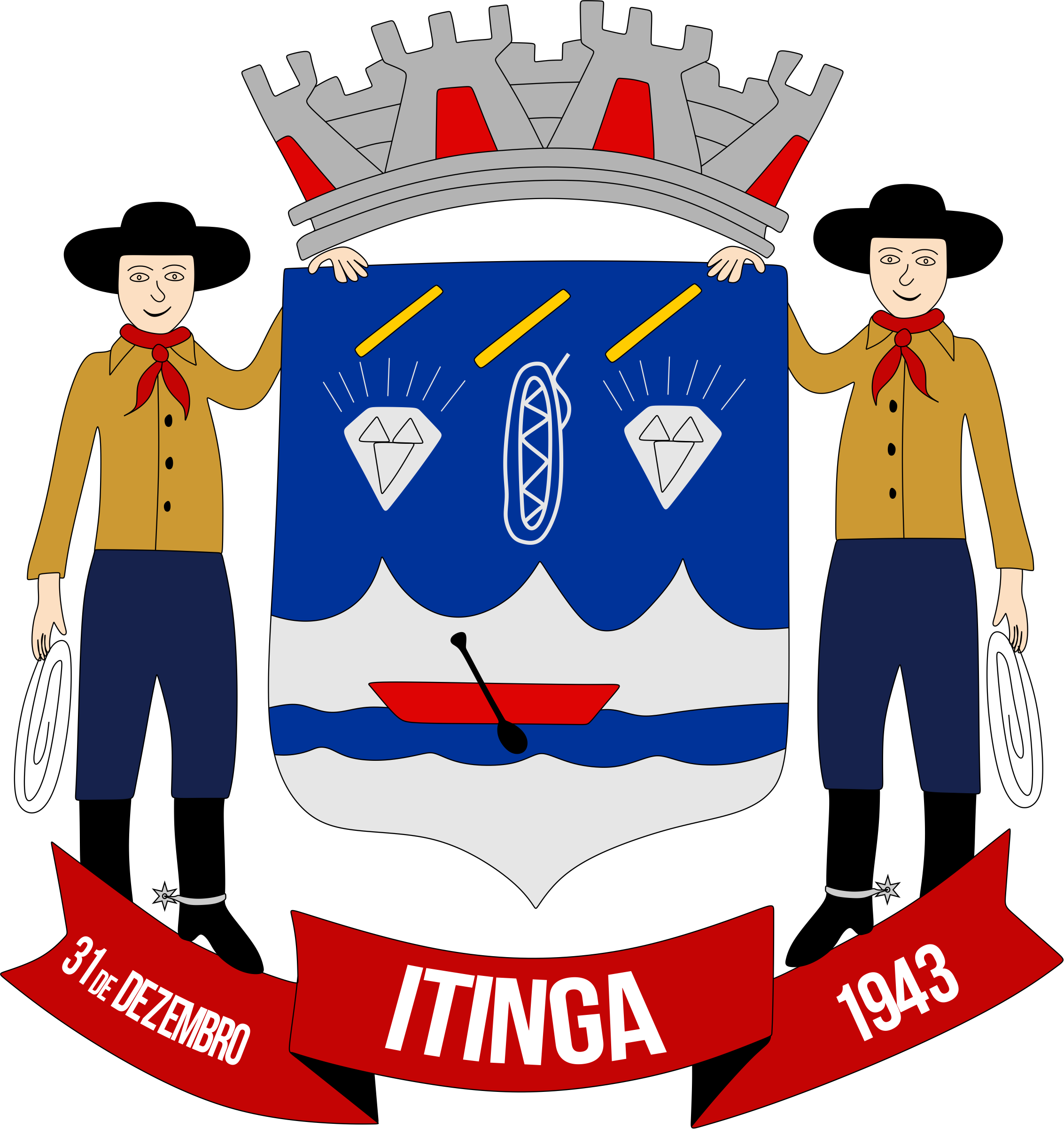
- Flag Coat of arms

- Country: Brazil
- State: Minas Gerais
- Incorporated: 31 December 1943

Government
  - Mayor: João Bosco Versiani Gusmão Cordeiro (PP)

Area
  - Total: 1,649 km^{2} (637 sq mi)

Population (2020)
  - Total: 15 022
  - Density: 9.1/km^{2} (24/sq mi)
- Demonym: Itinguense
- Time zone: UTC−3 (BRT)
- Postal Code: 39610-000
- Area code(s): +55 33
- Website: Itinga, Minas Gerais

Itinga (Brazilian Portuguese pronunciation: [iˈt͡ʃĩɡɐ]) is a Brazilian municipality located in the northeast of the state of Minas Gerais in the Jequitinhonha River valley. As of 2020 the population was 15,022 in a total area of 1,641 km^{2}. The city belongs to the mesoregion of Jequitinhonha and to the microregion of Araçuaí. The elevation of the municipal seat is 269 meters. It became a municipality in 1943. Between the municipalities of Araçuaí and Itinga is located the largest lithium mine in Brazil, explored and extracted by Sigma Lithium Resources.

== Etymology ==
The name "Itinga" is a term of Tupi origin that means "white water", through the combination of the terms 'y ("water") and ting ("white").

== History ==
The lands where the municipality of Itinga is located today were inhabited by the Botocudo tribes. Rock inscriptions by these groups are found in caves in the municipality.

Non-indigenous settlement in the area began in 1810, when alferes Julião Fernandes Leão set up barracks along the Jequitinhonha River. Later, landowners built a chapel dedicated to Saint Anthony of Padua, which gave rise to the city. Settlement in the area was encouraged due to its location on the banks of the Jequitinhonha River, as it was a meeting point for tropeiros and canoeists, and because it was home to a textile factory that operated between 1880 and 1928.

Itinga was part of Araçuaí until 1943, when it became a municipality.

== Geography ==
According to the regional division in force since 2017, established by the IBGE, the municipality belongs to the Intermediate Geographic Region of Teófilo Otoni and Immediate Geographic Region of Araçuaí. Until then, with the divisions into microregions and mesoregions in force, it was part of the microregion of Araçuaí, which in turn was included in the mesoregion of Jequitinhonha.

The city is crossed by the Jequitinhonha River and is accessed via the BR-367 highway.

== Economy ==
The city's GDP is around R$148.3 million reais, with 47.9% of the added value coming from public administration, followed by services (28.7%), industry (13.3%) and agriculture (10.2%). The GDP per capita of Itinga is R$9.8 thousand.

== Culture ==
Itinga is renowned for its clay crafts, especially in the village of Pasmadinho, which is a town made up of artisans who produce and sell clay pots and utensils. Ulisses Mendes, one of the main artisans of the Jequitinhonha Valley, lives in the town.

The city's anniversary on December 31 is the biggest New Year's Eve celebration in the region, with nationally famous artists performing. The city also celebrates Carnival and, in September, the Nossa Senhora da Ajuda festival transforms the streets into open-air markets during the day, along with musical performances at night.

== See also ==
- List of municipalities in Minas Gerais
