= Divisópolis =

Human settlement in Brazil

Coordinates: 15°44′S 41°00′W

- Municipality
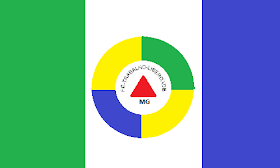
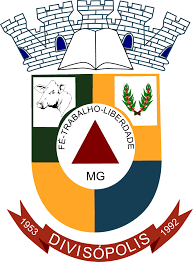
- Flag Coat of arms
- Interactive map of Divisópolis
- Country: Brazil
- State: Minas Gerais
- Region: Southeast
- Time zone: UTC−3 (BRT)

Location of Divisópolis within Minas Gerais

Divisópolis is a Brazilian municipality located in the northeast of the state of Minas Gerais.

The population as of 2020 was estimated to be 11,211 people living in a total area of 566 km^{2}. The city belongs to the mesoregion of Jequitinhonha and to the microregion of Almenara.

Divisópolis is located on the state boundary of Minas Gerais and Bahia. It is 26 km. south of the Bahian city of Encruzilhada. Highway connections are poor making the region isolated and impoverished. The distance to the state capital Belo Horizonte is 551 km.

Neighboring municipalities are: Pedra Azul, Divisa Alegre, Almenara, Bandeira, and Mata Verde.

The history of the municipality began with the arrival of the tax collectors Sérgio Chaves and João Antônio Dutra to these lands known as Gerais, in 1936. The region was known as Boca da Mata and, due to the belief that the town had no future, it was called Só se vendo (we have to see), later becoming Sósseveno in 1953. In the same year it became a district of Almenara, separating in 1992.

The location is in a mountainous area with an elevation of 910 meters. The main economic activities are cattle raising and the cultivation of coffee, sugarcane and corn. Coffee is the main crop with 2,650 hectares planted in 2006. The GDP in 2006 was R$24,039,000. There was 01 banking agency as of 2007. In the same year there were 79 automobiles.

This municipality is isolated from major population centers and suffers from drought and poor soils.

- Municipal Human Development Index: .605 (2000)
- State ranking: 825 out of 853 municipalities as of 2000
- National ranking: 4,581 out of 5,138 municipalities as of 2000

- Degree of urbanization: 11.37% (2000)--the rate for Minas Gerais was 82.0%
- Illiteracy rate: 37.57% (15 years old or older) The rate for Minas Gerais was 11.96%; the rate for Brazil was 13.63%
- Urban area covered by sewage system: 1.30%--the rate for Minas Gerais was 81.39%
- Health clinics, health centers, and hospitals: 0, 02, 01 with 18 beds

== See also ==
- List of municipalities in Minas Gerais
