= Rubim =

Municipality in Minas Gerais, Brazil

Coordinates: 16°22′30″S 40°32′16″W

- Municipality
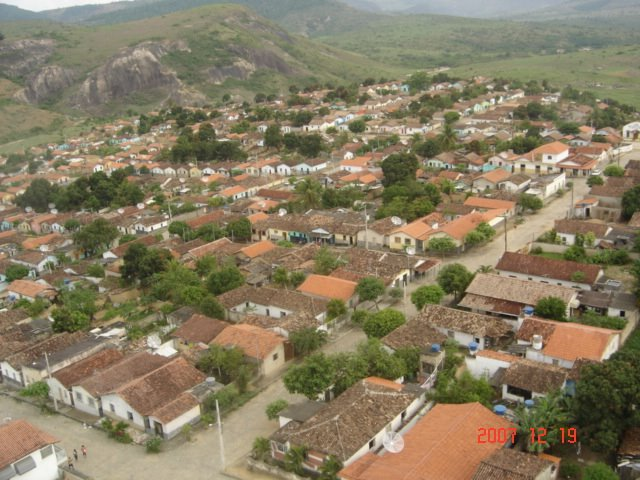
- View of the city from the air

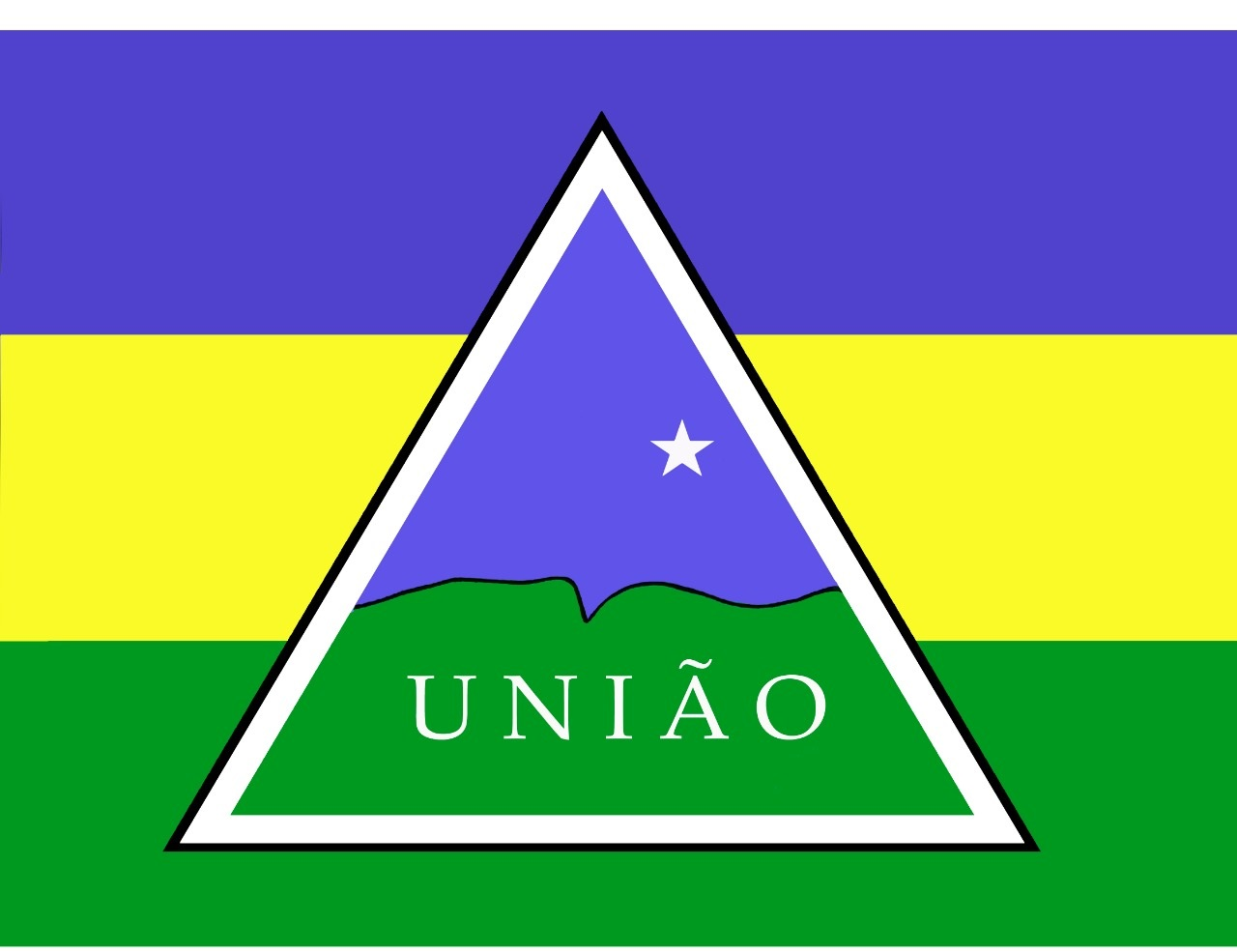
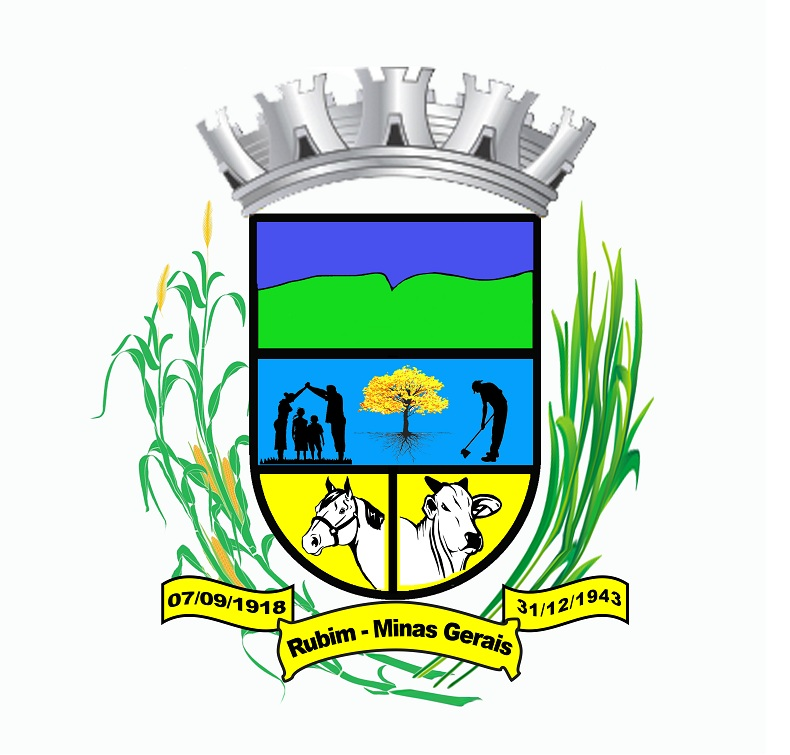
- Flag Coat of arms

- Location in Minas Gerais

- Location in Brazil
- Country: Brazil
- Region: Southeast
- State: Minas Gerais
- Intermediate Geographic Region: Teófilo Otoni
- Immediate Geographic Region: Almenara

Area
  - Total: 965.174 km^{2} (372.656 sq mi)
- Elevation: 254 m (833 ft)

Population (2022)
  - Total: 10,298
  - Density: 10.67/km^{2} (27.6/sq mi)
- Time zone: UTC−3 (BRT)
- Website: rubim.mg.gov.br

Rubim is a municipality in the northeast of the Brazilian state of Minas Gerais. Its population in 2020 was 10,256 inhabitants in a total area of 969 km^{2}. Neighboring municipalities are: Almenara, Jacinto, Santa Maria do Salto, Palmópolis, Rio do Prado, Jequitinhonha, and Felisburgo. The distance to Almenara, the regional center, is 36 km to the northwest. The elevation of the municipal seat is 254 meters. It became a municipality in 1943. This municipality is located in the valley of the Rubim do Sul River, a tributary of the Jequitinhonha River.

== Economics and social indicators ==
The main economic activities are cattle raising, and subsistence farming. The GDP was R$31.6 million (US$14.52 million) in 2005. There was 01 banking agency in 2006. There were 216 automobiles in 2007. The main cash crop was coffee. In the health sector there were 6 health clinics and 1 hospital with 58 beds. The score on the Municipal Human Development Index was 0.625 (medium). This ranked Rubim 797th out of 853 municipalities in the state, with Poços de Caldas in first place with 0.841 and Setubinha in last place with 0.568. See Frigoletto for the complete list. In 2006 there were 454 rural farms with 500 hectares of planted area. Most of the rural area was natural pasture or woodland. Only 05 of the farms had tractors.

- Illiteracy rate: 32.30%
- Infant mortality rate: 19.23
- Degree of urbanization: 77.94%
- Life expectancy: 61.3 (average of male and female)
- Percentage of urban residences connected to sewage system: 60.40 (All data are from 2000)

== See also ==
- List of municipalities in Minas Gerais
