= Santo Antônio do Jacinto =

- Municipality
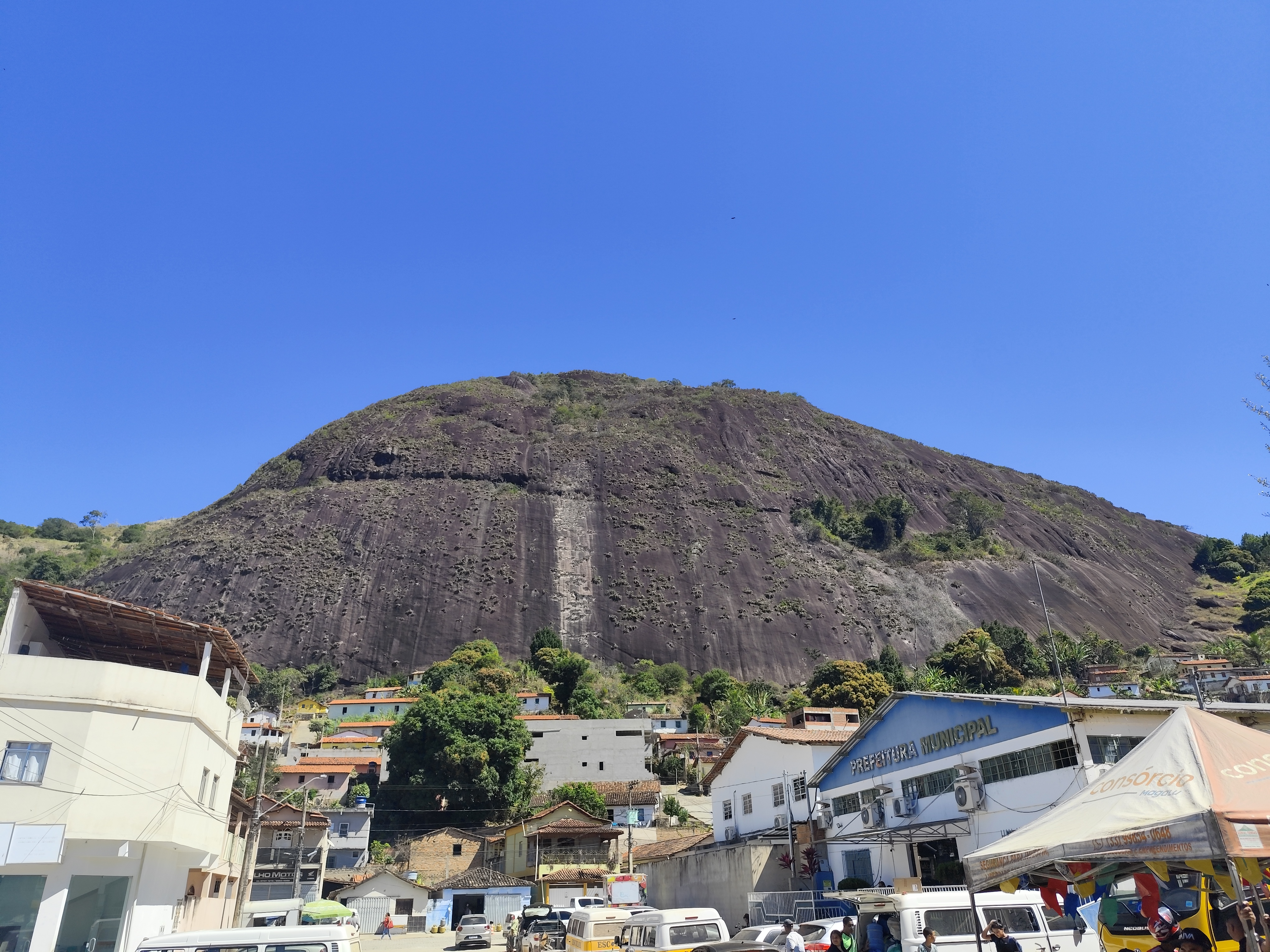

- Location in Minas Gerais state

- Location in Brazil
- Coordinates: 16°32′2″S 40°10′33″W
- Country: Brazil
- Region: Southeast
- State: Minas Gerais
- Intermediate Geographic Region: Teófilo Otoni
- Immediate Geographic Region: Almenara

Area
  - Total: 503.38 km^{2} (194.36 sq mi)

Population (2020)
  - Total: 11,604
  - Density: 23.052/km^{2} (59.705/sq mi)
- Time zone: UTC−3 (BRT)

Santo Antônio do Jacinto (first part, Portuguese meaning "Saint Anthony") is a municipality in the northeastern part of the state of Minas Gerais, Brazil. The population is 11,604 (2020 est.) in an area of 503.38 km^{2} (194.36 sq mi).

== Neighboring municipalities ==
- Jacinto
- Rubim

== Administrative Training ==
The district of Santo Antônio do Jacinto, formerly the village of Santo Antônio, was created by Law No. 336, of December 27, 1948, subordinate to the municipality of Jacinto. In 1950 and 1960, it continued to appear as a district of that municipality. Subsequently, it was elevated to the category of municipality by State Law No. 2,764, of December 30, 1962, being installed on March 1, 1963, with its seat in the former district of the same name and consisting of a single district. This configuration remained until 1982, when State Law No. 8,285, of October 8, 1982, created the district of Catajás, annexed to the municipality. Since then, according to the territorial division of 1983, Santo Antônio do Jacinto has been composed of two districts: the main district and Catajás, a structure that remained in effect at least until 2007.

== Cristianópolis Village ==
A village belonging to the city of Santo Antônio do Jacinto.

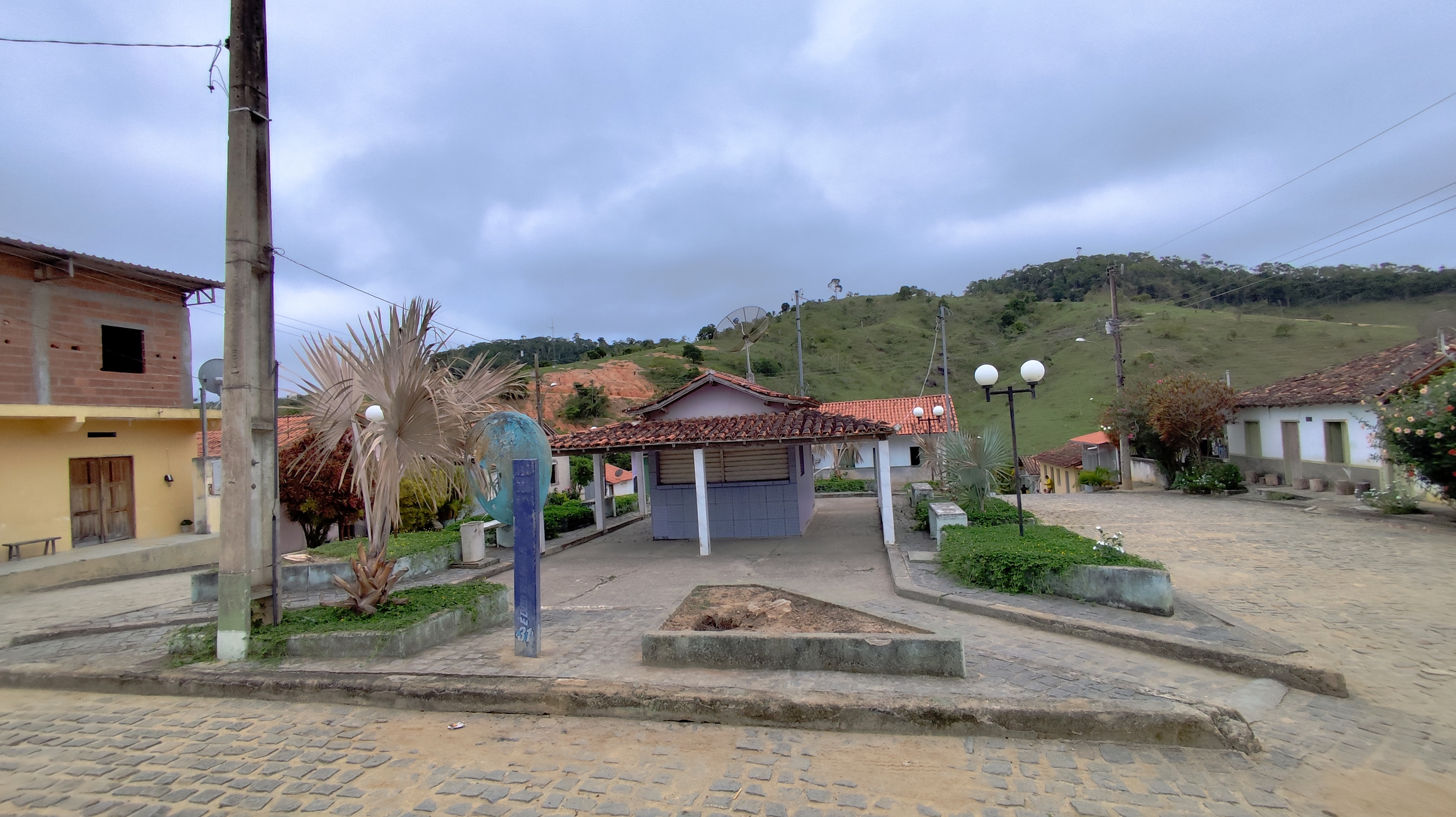
Cristianópolis - Santo Antônio do Jacinto

== Catajás Village ==
By State Law No. 8285, of 08-10-1982, the district of Catajás (formerly a village) was created and annexed to the municipality of Santo Antônio do Jacinto.

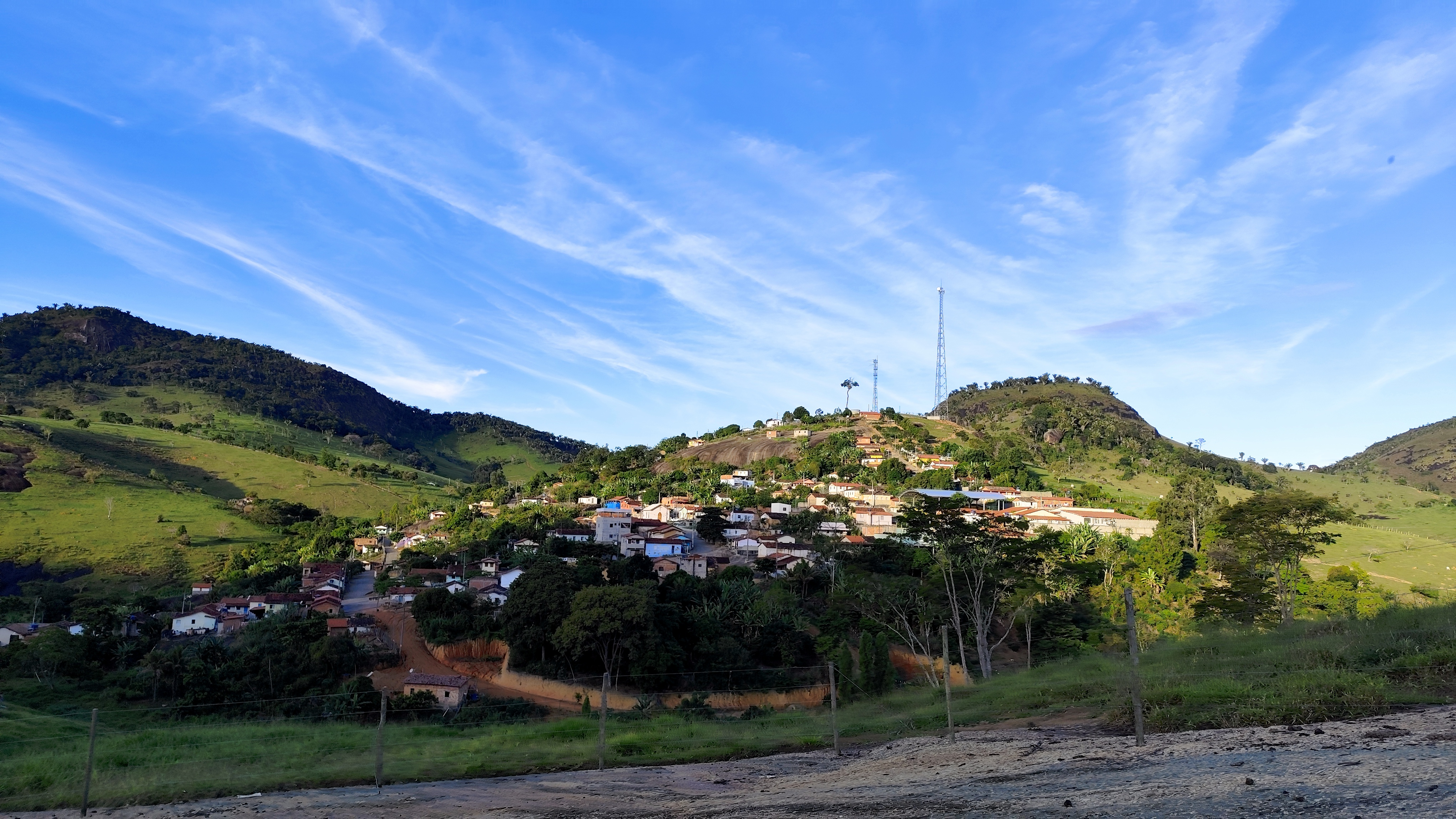
Catajás - Santo Antônio do Jacinto

== Population history ==
Year	Population
2004	12,170
2006	12,182
2015	12,008

== See also ==
- List of municipalities in Minas Gerais
