= Rio do Prado =

- Municipality
- Municipality of Rio do Prado
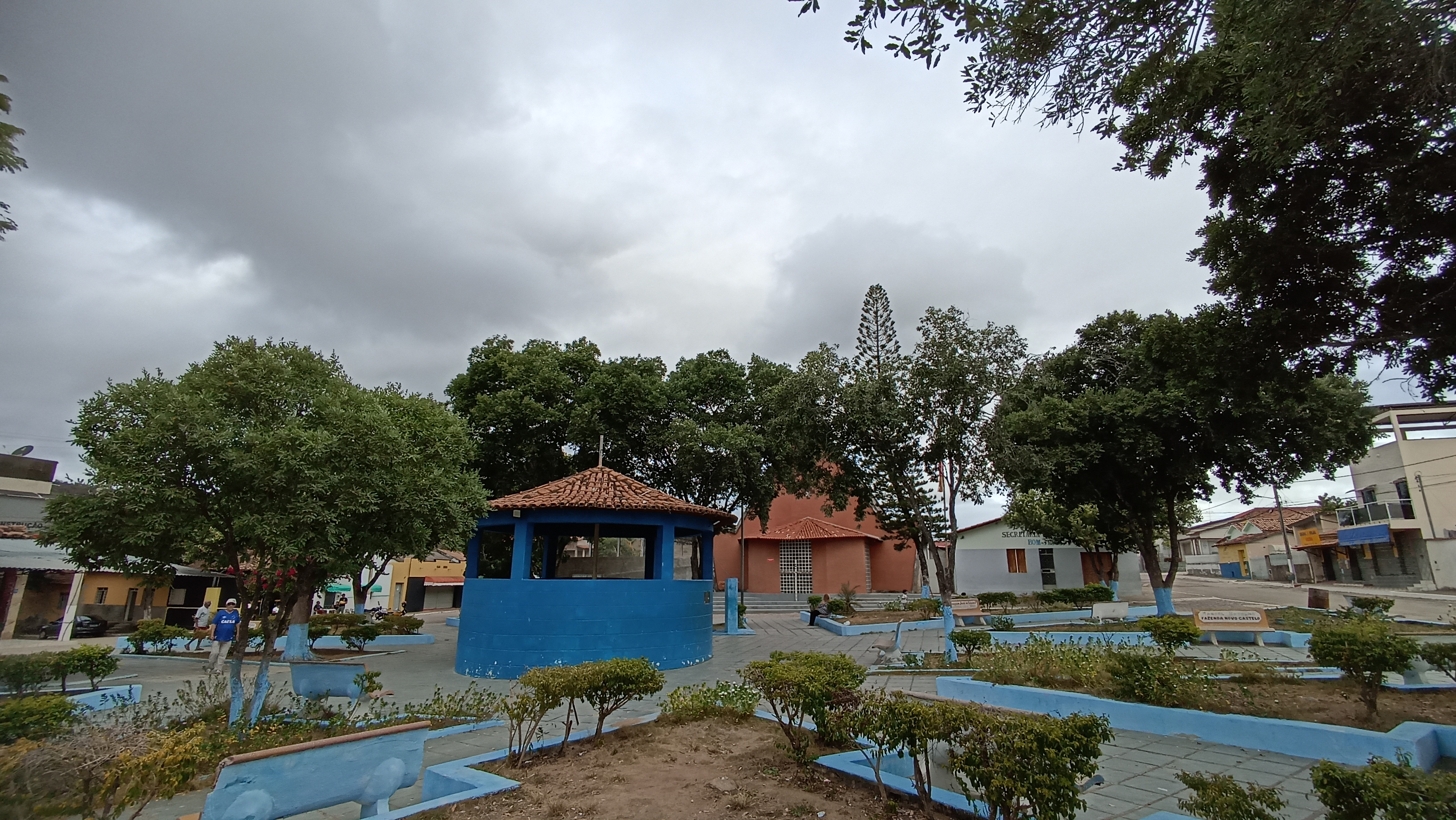
- Rio do Prado's main square

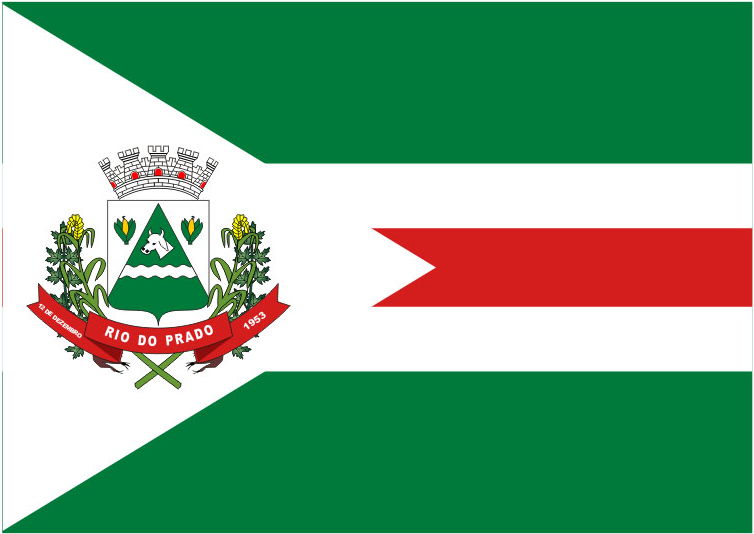
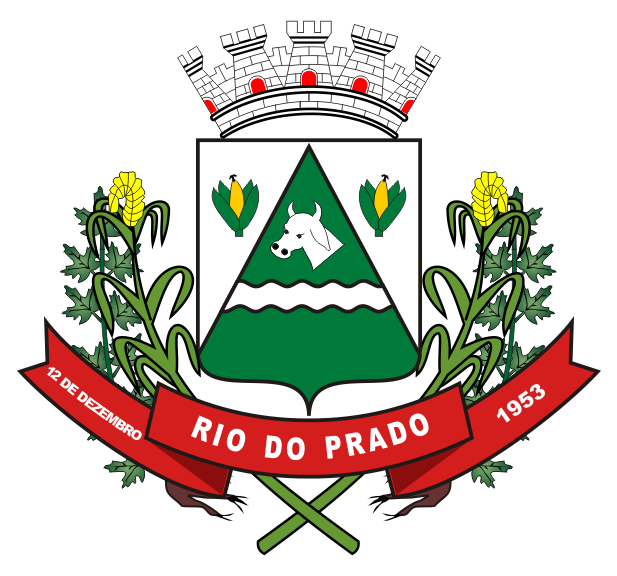
- Flag Coat of arms

- Location in Minas Gerais
- Country: Brazil
- State: Minas Gerais
- Region: Southeast
- Intermediate Region: Teófilo Otoni
- Immediate Region: Almenara
- Founded: 12 Dezember 1953

Government
  - Mayor: Adimilson Antunes de Almeida (PSB)

Area
  - Total: 479.815 km^{2} (185.258 sq mi)
- Elevation: 449 m (1,473 ft)

Population (2021)
  - Total: 5,117
  - Density: 10.66/km^{2} (27.62/sq mi)
- Demonym: rio-pradense
- Time zone: UTC−3 (BRT)
- Postal Code: 39940-000 to 39944-999
- HDI (2010): 0.605 – medium
- Website: riodoprado.mg.gov.br

Rio do Prado is a municipality in the northeast of the Brazilian state of Minas Gerais. Its population in 2020 was 5,133 inhabitants in a total area of 479 km^{2}. The city belongs to the Immediate Geographic Region of Almenara. The elevation of the municipal seat is 350 meters. It became a municipality in 1953, and is located in the valley of the Rubim do Sul River, a tributary of the Jequitinhonha River. Neighboring municipalities are: Palmópolis, Rubim, Bertópolis, and Felisburgo.

The main economic activities are cattle raising, and subsistence farming. The GDP was R$15,723,000 (2005). There were no banking agencies in 2006. There were 113 automobiles in 2007. The main cash crop was coffee. In the health sector there were 04 health clinics. The score on the Municipal Human Development Index was 0.626 (medium). This ranked Rio do Prado 793 out of 853 municipalities in the state, with Poços de Caldas in first place with 0.841 and Setubinha in last place with 0.568. See Frigoletto for the complete list.

== See also ==
- List of municipalities in Minas Gerais
