= Araçuaí =

Municipality in Minas Gerais, Brazil

- Municipality
- Municipality of Araçuaí
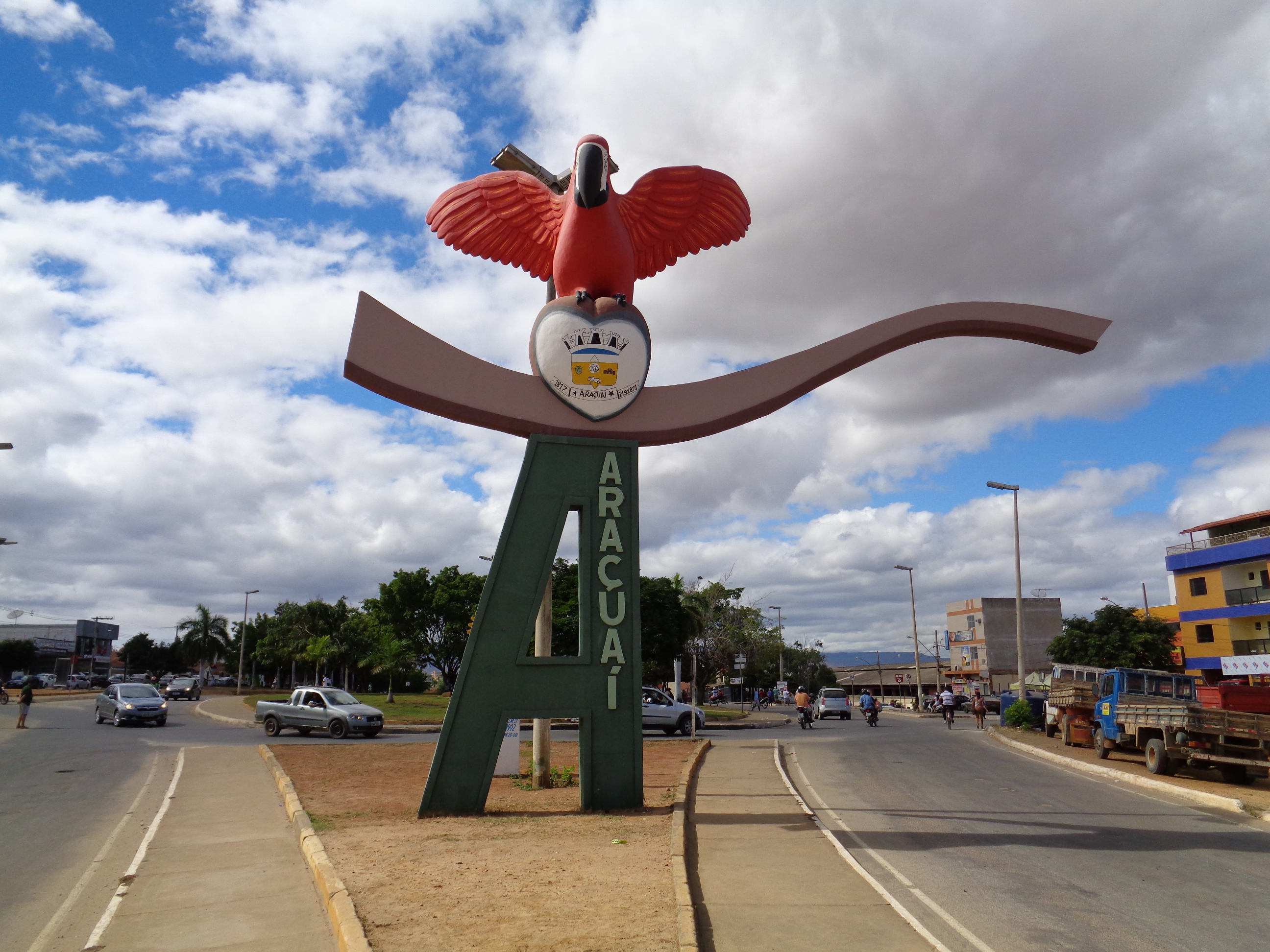
- Monument at the entrance to Araçuaí

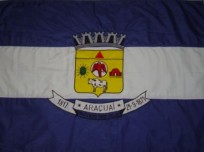
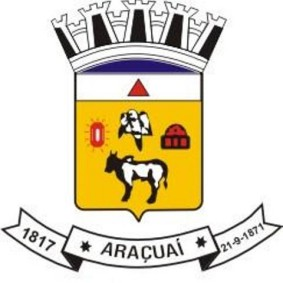
- Flag Coat of arms

- Location in Minas Gerais

- Location in Minas Gerais Location in Brazil
- Coordinates: 16°51′00″S 42°04′12″W
- Country: Brazil
- Region: Southeast
- State: Minas Gerais
- Intermediate region: Teófilo Otoni
- Immediate region: Araçuaí
- City status: 21 September 1871
- Districts: Araçuaí (seat), Engenheiro Schnoor, and Itira

Government
  - Mayor: Tadeu Barbosa de Oliveira (PSD)
  - Term: 2025–2028

Area
  - Total: 2,236.279 km^{2} (863.432 sq mi)
- Elevation: 307 m (1,007 ft)

Population (2022 census)
  - Total: 34,297
  - Estimate (2025): 35,185
  - Density: 15.337/km^{2} (39.722/sq mi)
- Demonym: araçuaiense
- Time zone: UTC−3 (BRT)
- Postal code: 39600-000
- Area code: 33
- HDI (2010): 0.663 (medium)
- GDP (2023): R$1.082 billion
- GDP per capita (2023): R$31,544.84
- Website: www.aracuai.mg.gov.br

Araçuaí (Portuguese pronunciation: [aɾɐswa'i]) is a municipality in northeastern Minas Gerais, Brazil, in the Jequitinhonha River valley. The Araçuaí River, a tributary of the Jequitinhonha, flows through the municipality. It had a population of 34,297 in the 2022 census, with an estimated population of 35,185 in 2025, in an area of 2,236.279 km^{2} (863.432 sq mi). It is part of the Immediate Geographic Region of Araçuaí, within the Intermediate Geographic Region of Teófilo Otoni. The city is the seat of the Roman Catholic Diocese of Araçuaí.

Between the municipalities of Araçuaí and Itinga is located the largest lithium mine in Brazil, explored and extracted by Sigma Lithium Resources.

== Etymology ==
The origin of the name "Araçuaí" has two versions: according to Auguste de Saint-Hilaire, the name was given by the paulistas to the river because they had found a large quantity of gold in it. They exclaimed: "ouro só ali" ("only gold there"), and from this phrase Araçuaí was created. According to philologist Eduardo de Almeida Navarro, Araçuaí comes from the Tupi language, through the composition of the words araso'iá (araçoia) and 'y (river), therefore meaning "river of the araçoias".

Until 1857, the place was called Calhau, due to the large quantity of pebbles (calhais) in the region.

== History ==
Before the arrival of the Europeans, the current municipality of Araçuaí was inhabited by the Tocoió and Botocudo indigenous.

The priest Carlos Pereira de Moura had founded the Aldeia do Pontal, currently Itira. The village was located next to the confluence of two large rivers: the Jequitinhonha and the Araçuaí. The village had a set of qualities to evolve into a city, such as easy access to canoes, used at the time for navigating rivers, but the priest was excessively demanding and authoritarian, prohibiting alcoholic beverages and prostitutes there. So, the prostitutes emigrated up the Araçuaí River, and the canoeists changed ports, attracted by them.

The prostitutes were sheltered by Luciana Teixeira, owner of the Fazenda da Boa Vista da Barra do Calhau, on her lands on the right bank of the Calhau and Araçuaí streams. This became the landing point for the canoes that went up the Jequitinhonha. Luciana started a village on her land in 1817.

Over time, the place gained importance. It was established under the name Vila de Arassuahy on July 1, 1871, and on September 21 of the same year it was elevated to the category of city, with the name Araçuaí.

Until 1911, the city was the capital of the entire northeast of Minas Gerais. In 1882, the Bahia and Minas Railway was built, connecting the Bahian city of Caravelas to Araçuaí, but it was deactivated and closed in 1966.

Today, Araçuaí is considered one of the commercial and educational centers of the Jequitinhonha valley.

== Geography ==
According to the regional division in force since 2017, established by the IBGE, the municipality belongs to the Intermediate Geographic Region of Teófilo Otoni and Immediate Geographic Region of Araçuaí. Until then, with the divisions into microregions and mesoregions in force, it was part of the microregion of Araçuaí, which in turn was included in the mesoregion of Jequitinhonha.

=== Climate ===
The maximum temperature of 44.8 °C (112.6 °F) recorded on November 19, 2023, in Araçuaí, is considered the highest ever maximum temperature recorded in Brazil.

Climate data for Araçuaí (1991–2020)
Month	Jan	Feb	Mar	Apr	May	Jun	Jul	Aug	Sep	Oct	Nov	Dec	Year
Mean daily maximum °C (°F)	33.7 (92.7)	34.7 (94.5)	33.7 (92.7)	32.6 (90.7)	30.9 (87.6)	29.8 (85.6)	29.6 (85.3)	31.0 (87.8)	32.8 (91.0)	34.0 (93.2)	32.3 (90.1)	32.8 (91.0)	32.3 (90.1)
Daily mean °C (°F)	26.7 (80.1)	27.2 (81.0)	26.7 (80.1)	25.7 (78.3)	23.8 (74.8)	22.5 (72.5)	22.2 (72.0)	23.5 (74.3)	25.5 (77.9)	26.9 (80.4)	26.1 (79.0)	26.2 (79.2)	25.3 (77.5)
Mean daily minimum °C (°F)	21.6 (70.9)	21.8 (71.2)	21.7 (71.1)	20.7 (69.3)	18.4 (65.1)	16.7 (62.1)	16.2 (61.2)	17.1 (62.8)	19.7 (67.5)	21.6 (70.9)	21.6 (70.9)	21.5 (70.7)	19.9 (67.8)
Average precipitation mm (inches)	109.7 (4.32)	79.3 (3.12)	95.8 (3.77)	27.9 (1.10)	16.8 (0.66)	3.5 (0.14)	4.0 (0.16)	4.7 (0.19)	11.3 (0.44)	51.8 (2.04)	149.3 (5.88)	153.1 (6.03)	707.2 (27.84)
Average precipitation days (≥ 1.0 mm)	8	6	8	4	2	1	1	1	1	4	10	11	57
Average relative humidity (%)	66.0	62.2	65.4	64.7	63.8	62.2	58.9	53.8	51.2	53.3	65.2	69.4	61.3
Source: Instituto Nacional de Meteorologia

== Economy ==
In 2023, Araçuaí had a gross domestic product of approximately R$1.082 billion, equivalent to R$31,544.84 per resident.

== Culture ==
In the city, the Araçuaí Museum was created to house the collection of objects and documents that record the religiosity, customs and activities that make up the history of Araçuaí and the region. The museum was created by the artist Lira Marques and Frei Chico, a Dutch Franciscan friar who worked as a researcher of Brazilian popular culture and religiosity. Every year, in September, the city holds the Micareta de Araçuaí, an off-season carnival that attracts many people from the region.

== See also ==
- List of municipalities in Minas Gerais
