= Mata Verde =

Human settlement in Brazil

Coordinates: 15°41′09″S 40°44′27″W

- Municipality
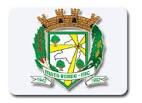
- Coat of arms

- Location in Minas Gerais

- Location in Brazil
- Country: Brazil
- Region: Southeast
- State: Minas Gerais
- Intermediate Geographic Region: Teófilo Otoni
- Immediate Geographic Region: Almenara

Area
  - Total: 227.539 km^{2} (87.853 sq mi)
- Elevation: 865 m (2,838 ft)

Population (2022)
  - Total: 9,112
  - Density: 40.05/km^{2} (103.7/sq mi)
- Time zone: UTC−3 (BRT)
- Website: mataverde.mg.gov.br

Mata Verde is a Brazilian municipality located in the state of Minas Gerais. As of 2020, the population was 8,644 and the area was 230 km^{2} (89 sq mi). The elevation is 865 m (2,838 ft). The city belongs to the Immediate Geographic Region of Almenara. It became a municipality in 1993. It is located on the boundary with the state of Bahia and is connected by dirt road to Divisópolis. To the north there are road connections with Encruzilhada in the state of Bahia. Neighboring municipalities are Divisópolis and Bandeira.

== Economics and social indicators ==
The main economic activities are cattle raising and subsistence farming. The GDP was R$19.45 million (US$7.99 million) in 2005. The main cash crop was coffee with 550 hectares (1,400 acres) planted in 2006. There were 73 automobiles in 2007. One banking agency was listed for the same year. In the rural zone there were 202 producers with a total planted area of 900 hectares (2,200 acres). Most of the land was in natural pasture or woodland. Only seven of the farms had tractors in 2006. There was one public health center.

- Municipal Human Development Index: .604 (2000)
- State ranking: 826 out of 853 municipalities as of 2000
- National ranking: 4,593 out of 5,138 municipalities as of 2000
- Degree of urbanization: 80.30
- Illiteracy rate: 38.22 (population older than 15)
- Percentage of urban homes connected to sewage system: 73.60%
- Infant mortality rate: 33.06

== See also ==
- List of municipalities in Minas Gerais
