= Salto da Divisa =

- Municipality
- The Municipality of Salto da Divisa
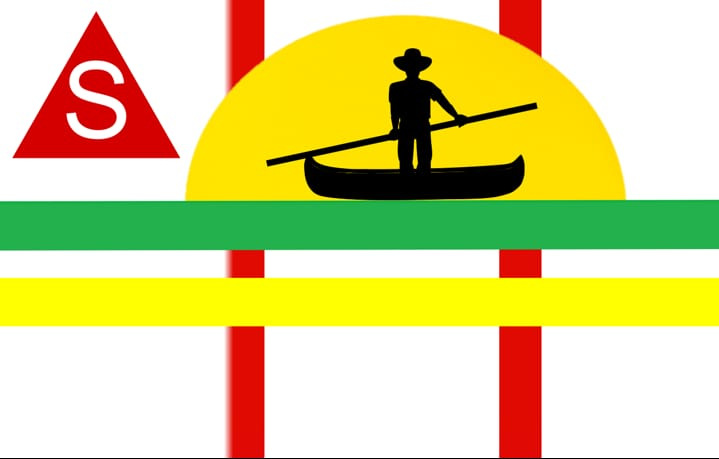
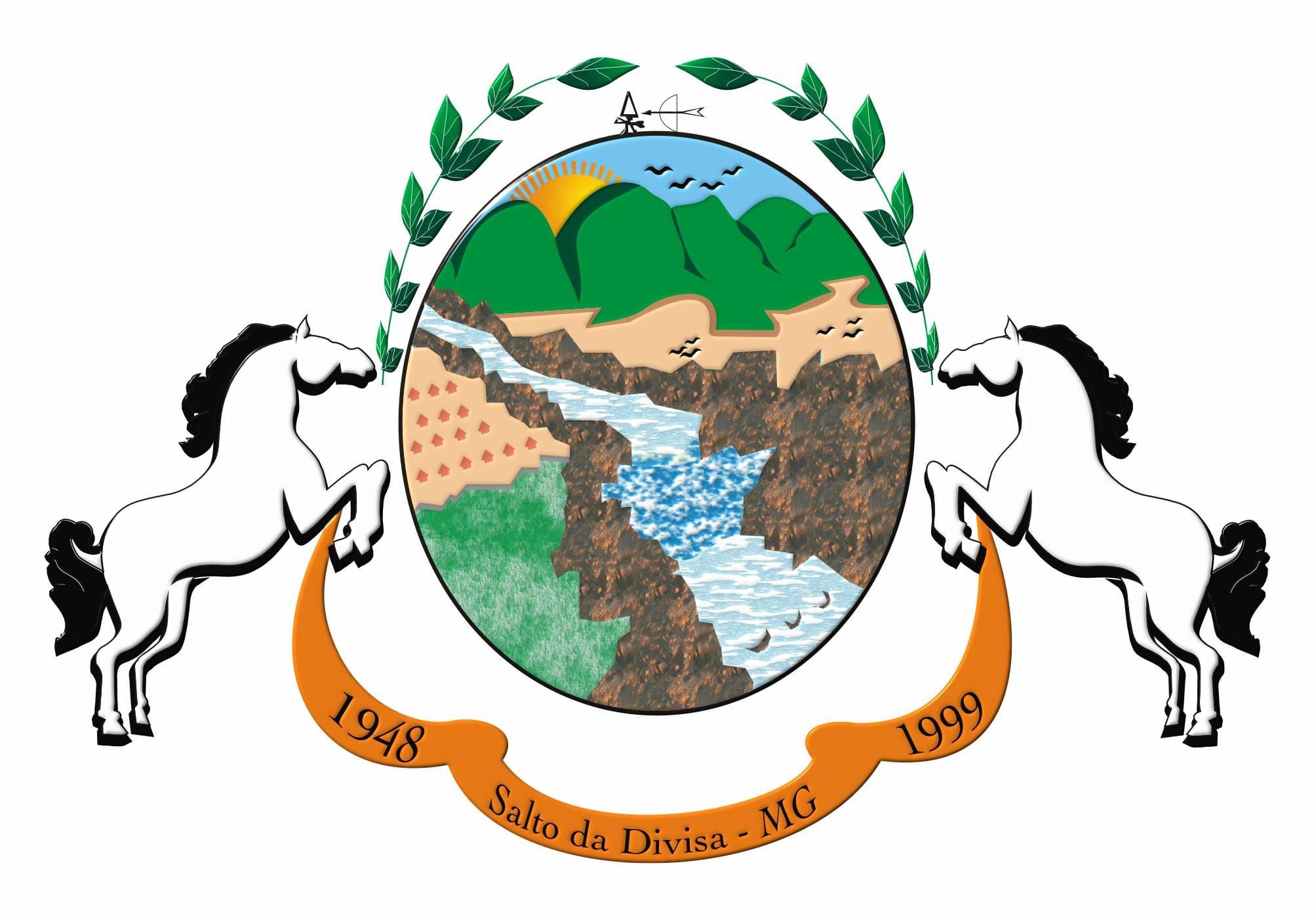
- Flag Coat of arms

- Location in Minas Gerais
- Coordinates: 16°00′10″S 39°56′49″W
- Country: Brazil
- Region: Southeast
- State: Minas Gerais
- Intermediate Geographic Region: Teófilo Otoni
- Immediate Geographic Region: Almenara
- Founded: December 27, 1948

Area
  - Total: 943.647 km^{2} (364.344 sq mi)

Population (2020)
  - Total: 7,012
  - Density: 6.4/km^{2} (17/sq mi)
- Time zone: UTC−3 (BRT)
- HDI (2000): 0.642 – medium

Salto da Divisa is a municipality in the northeast of the Brazilian state of Minas Gerais. Its population in 2020 was 7,012 inhabitants in a total area of 943.647 km^{2}. It is the easternmost municipality of Minas Gerais, and belongs to the Immediate Geographic Region of Almenara. The elevation of the municipal seat is 142 meters. It became a municipality in 1948, and is located on the Jequitinhonha River, which crosses the state boundary with Espírito Santo at this point.

Neighboring municipalities are: Jordânia, Santa Maria do Salto, and Jacinto. There are paved connections with the important BR-101, 48 km distant to the east.

== Economy ==
The main economic activities are cattle raising, and subsistence farming. The GDP was R$28.99 million (US$11.91 million) in 2005. There was 1 banking agency in 2006. There were 63 automobiles in 2007. The main cash crop was coffee. In the health sector there were 3 health clinics and 1 hospital with 58 beds. The score on the Municipal Human Development Index was 0.642 (medium). This ranked Salta da Divisa 768 out of 853 municipalities in the state, with Poços de Caldas in first place with 0.841 and Setubinha in last place with 0.568. See Frigoletto for the complete list.

In 2006 there were 181 rural farms with 220 hectares of planted area. Most of the rural area was natural pasture or woodland. Only 28 of the farms had tractors. There was a large cattle herd of 81,000 head, the cattle being raised for meat.

== See also ==
- List of municipalities in Minas Gerais
