= Monte Formoso =

Human settlement in Brazil

Coordinates: 16°51′45″S 41°14′50″W

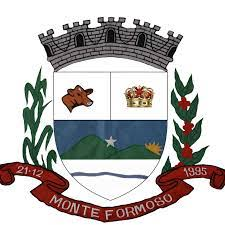
- Flag

- Country: Brazil
- Region: Southeast
- State: Minas Gerais
- Intermediate Geographic Region: Teófilo Otoni
- Immediate Geographic Region: Teófilo Otoni

Area
  - Total: 385.553 km^{2} (148.863 sq mi)
- Elevation: 380 m (1,250 ft)

Population (2022)
  - Total: 4,381
  - Density: 7.02/km^{2} (18.2/sq mi)
- Time zone: UTC−3 (BRT)
- Website: monteformoso.mg.gov.br

Monte Formoso is a Brazilian municipality located in the northeastern part of the state of Minas Gerais. The city belongs to the IBGE statistical mesoregion of Jequitinhonha and to the microregion of Almenara. As of 2020 the population was 4,923 in an area of 384 km^{2} and the elevation was 651 meters.

Due to its isolation and poor soils for agriculture, Monte Formoso is one of the poorest municipalities in the country. The main economic activities were cattle raising and modest production of coffee, sugarcane, beans, and rice. As of 2007 there were no financial institutions. In the same year there were 56 automobiles, 10 trucks, 13 pickup trucks and 81 motorcycles. In the rural area there were 384 producers on 17,000 hectares. Only 2 of the farms had tractors in 2006. There were 4 public health clinics and no hospital as of 2006.

== Social indicators ==
Municipal Human Development Index

- MHDI: 0.570 (2000)
- State ranking: 852 out of 853 municipalities
- National ranking: 5,115 out of 5,138 municipalities
- Life expectancy: 60
- Literacy rate: 61 For the complete list see Frigoletto
- Combined primary, secondary and tertiary gross enrolment ratio: .733
- Per capita income (monthly): R$63.02 For the complete list see Frigoletto

== See also ==
- List of municipalities in Minas Gerais
