= Bahia-Minas Railway =

Overview
- Native name: Estrada de Ferro Bahia e Minas
- Status: Deactivated

History
- Opened: January 25, 1881
- Closed: 1966

Technical
- Track gauge: 1,000 mm (3 ft 3+3/8 in) metre gauge

Bahia-Minas Railway (in portuguese: Estrada de Ferro Bahia e Minas, EFBM; popularly known as Bahiminas or Baiminas) was a Brazilian railway that connected the Jequitinhonha Valley, in northeastern Minas Gerais, to the southern coast of Bahia. Inaugurated on January 25, 1881, and deactivated in 1966, it spanned 578 kilometers and linked the Minas Gerais municipality of Araçuaí to the district of Ponta de Areia, in Caravelas, on the extreme southern coast of Bahia, where the tracks reached a port. The railway played a crucial role in the region's economy.

== History ==
The Bahia-Minas Railway was established under Minas Gerais State Law No. 2,775 (October 25, 1878) and Bahia State Law No. 1,946 (August 28, 1879), entering operation in 1881. By November 9 of that year, the railroad had nearly 143 km of active track. Engineer Miguel de Teive e Argollo received the concession in 1879 to build and operate the railway, which he had envisioned, and became director-general of the Bahia and Minas Railway Company. From 1880 to 1882, Argollo designed and oversaw the construction of 142 km of track, starting from Caravelas in southern Bahia, with the line officially inaugurated in November 1883.

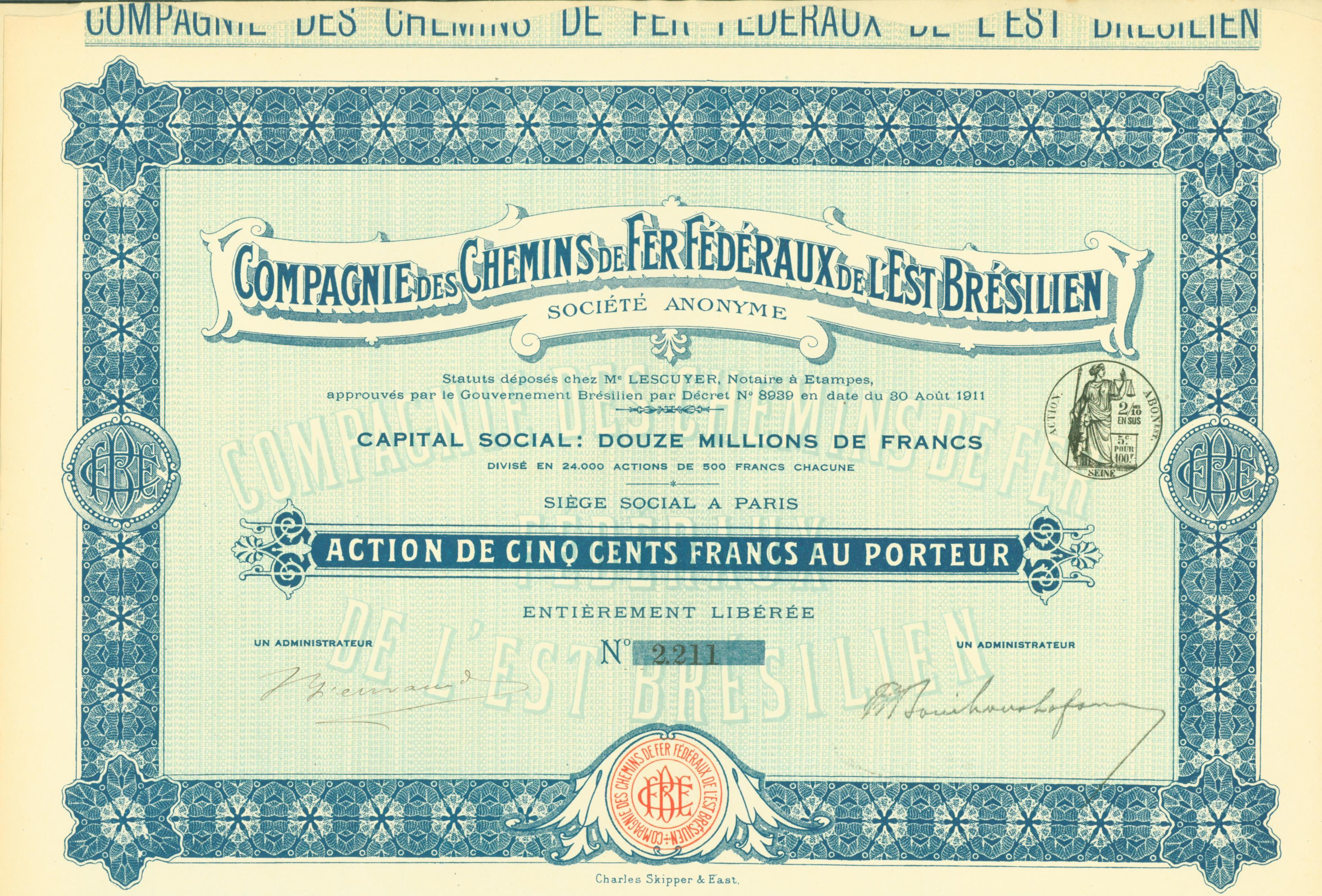
Share of the Compagnie des Chemins de Fer Fédéraux de l'Est Brésilien, issued 30 August 1911

The railway's primary route connected Ponta de Areia, near Caravelas on Bahia's southern coast, to Araçuaí in the Jequitinhonha Valley, spanning 578 km. Built around 1882 by the Bahia Railway Company in partnership with Minas Gerais' government, its main purpose was timber transport—particularly railroad ties for other lines, including the Bahia Railway itself—while also linking the valley to a planned export port in Caravelas. In 1910, the federal government took over the railway, transferring its concession in 1912 to the Franco-Belgian Compagnie des Chemins de Fer Fédéraux de l'Est Brésilien (CCFFEB), which operated it until 1937. However, with timber trade declining and the port never materializing, attempts to sustain the line through coffee exports failed due to economic crises. The railway was later absorbed by the Viação Férrea Federal Leste Brasileiro (VFFLB), the Departamento Nacional de Estradas de Ferro (DNEF), and the Viação Férrea Centro-Oeste (VFCO) before being decommissioned in 1966 under Rede Ferroviária Federal S.A.

The Bahia-Minas Railway was immortalized in Brazilian culture through Milton Nascimento and Fernando Brant's song "Ponta de Areia". In 2023, its history was revisited in Emerson Penha's documentary Estrada Natural, featuring interviews with former workers, passengers, and residents along the route, highlighting the lasting impact of its closure.
