= Joaíma =

Human settlement in Brazil

Coordinates: 16°39′S 41°02′W

- Municipality
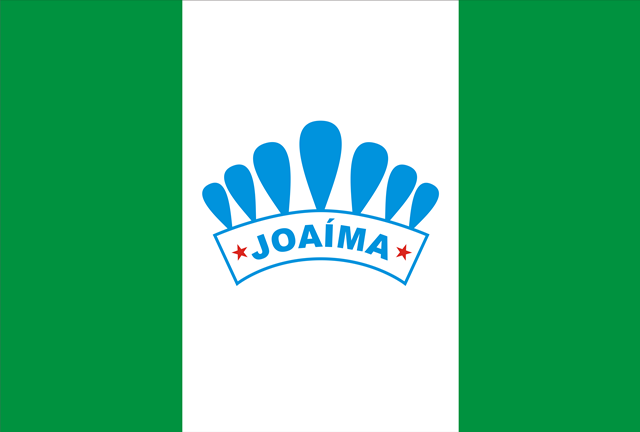
- Flag

- Location in Minas Gerais

- Location in Brazil
- Country: Brazil
- Region: Southeast
- State: Minas Gerais
- Intermediate Geographic Region: Teófilo Otoni
- Immediate Geographic Region: Almenara

Area
  - Total: 1,664.190 km^{2} (642.547 sq mi)
- Elevation: 292 m (958 ft)

Population (2022)
  - Total: 13,888
  - Density: 8.35/km^{2} (21.6/sq mi)
- Time zone: UTC−3 (BRT)
- Website: joaima.mg.gov.br

Joaíma is a Brazilian municipality located in the northeast of the state of Minas Gerais. Its population as of 2020 was estimated to be 15,455 people living in a total area of 1,668 km^{2} (644 sq mi). The city belongs to the Immediate Geographic Region of Almenara. Joaíma is located 27 km. south of the Jequitinhonha River. BR-116 is 58 km. to the west. The elevation is 294 meters. It became a municipality in 1948. Neighboring municipalities are: Jequitinhonha, Felisburgo, Monte Formoso, and Ponto dos Volantes.

== Economy ==
The main economic activities are cattle raising and the cultivation of coffee, sugarcane and corn. The GDP in 2006 was R$43.73 million (US$20.1 million). There were 02 banking agencies as of 2007. In the same year there were 392 automobiles, which was a ratio of one automobile for every 50 people. In the rural area there were 970 farms of which only 21 had tractors. Most of the farming practiced is on the subsistence level. There were 62,000 head of cattle in 2006. This municipality is isolated from major population centers and suffers from drought and poor soils.

== Social indicators ==
- Municipal Human Development Index: .646 (2000)
- State ranking: 756 out of 853 municipalities as of 2000
- National ranking: 3,832 out of 5,138 municipalities as of 2000
- Degree of urbanization: 70.48% (2000)--the rate for Minas Gerais was 82.0%
- Illiteracy rate: 35.51% (15 years old or older) The rate for Minas Gerais was 11.96%; the rate for Brazil was 13.63%
- Urban area covered by sewage system: 64.10%--the rate for Minas Gerais was 81.39%
- Health centers and hospitals: 07 health centers and 01 hospital with 59 beds

== See also ==
- List of municipalities in Minas Gerais
