= Mata Escura Biological Reserve =

Protected biological region

- Reserva Biológica da Mata Escura
- IUCN category Ia (strict nature reserve)
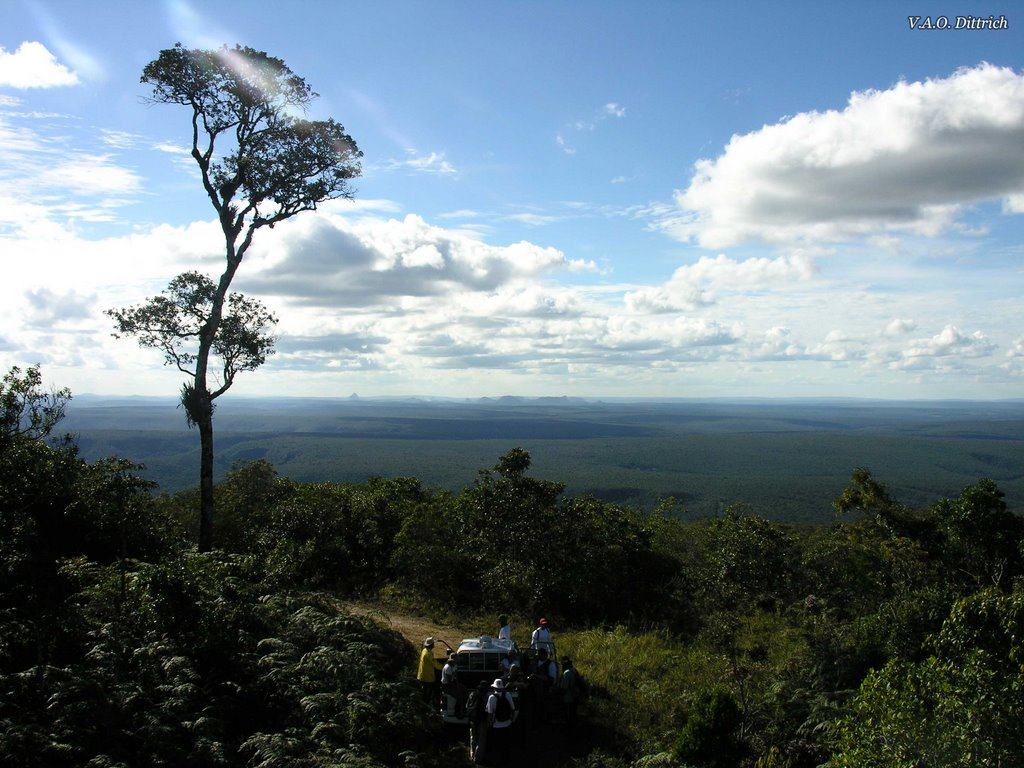
- View of the reserve

- Location within Brazil
- Nearest city: Jequitinhonha, Minas Gerais
- Coordinates: 16°18′51″S 41°02′41″W
- Area: 50,890 ha (196.5 sq mi)
- Designation: Biological reserve
- Created: 5 June 2003
- Administrator: Chico Mendes Institute for Biodiversity Conservation

The Mata Escura Biological Reserve (Portuguese: Reserva Biológica da Mata Escura) is a biological reserve in the state of Minas Gerais, Brazil. It protects a remnant of Atlantic Forest, and includes a unique mix of vegetation on sandy hilltops. The reserve overlaps with a traditional quilombo community, creating a conflict with the reserve's full-protected status.

== Location ==
The Mata Escura Biological Reserve is divided between the municipalities of Almenara (1.4%) and Jequitinhonha (98.58%) in the state of Minas Gerais. It has an area of 50,890 hectares (125,800 acres). (Note: According to the reserve's administrator, ICMBio, the area is 50,872.42 hectares (125,708.5 acres).) The terrain consists of flat upland areas cut by stream valleys. Altitudes range from 250 to 1,150 metres (820 to 3,770 ft). The watercourses, which rise above 850 metres (2,790 ft), are all left tributaries of the Jequitinhonha River. The Córrego Labirinto, a stream, supplies the city of Jequitinhonha.

The reserve overlaps the quilombo community of Mumbuca by 75%, with about 81 families.

== History ==
In 1999 a team from the Minas Gerais State Forestry Institute and the Federal University of Minas Gerais visited the region to identify the main remnants of Atlantic Forest in the northeast of the state, a priority for conservation since the fragments may harbor the last wild populations of golden-headed lion tamarin (Leontopithecus chrysomelas) and golden-bellied capuchin (Sapajus xanthosternos). A fully protected unit of 20,500 hectares (51,000 acres) was suggested, but without follow-up. In 2002 more detailed studies were made due to the environmental compensation needed for the Itapebi Hydroelectric Plant in Bahia.

The Mata Escura Biological Reserve was created by federal decree on 5 June 2003 to fully preserve the natural resources and biological diversity of the area. The area was more than twice that originally envisaged. The reserve is classed as IUCN protected area category Ia (strict nature reserve). It is administered by the Chico Mendes Institute for Biodiversity Conservation (ICMBio). On 6 December 2006 the Ministry of the Environment began a study on how to resolve the problem of communities living inside the reserve. A working group was appointed on 17 December 2008 for this purpose. The consultative council was created on 28 May 2014.

== Environment ==
Average annual rainfall is 1,000 metres (3,300 ft). Average temperature is 24 °C (75 °F). The reserve contains one of the last remnants of Atlantic Forest in the northeast of Minas Gerais. Vegetation includes seasonal semi-deciduous forest, seasonal deciduous forest, altitude forest and unique local meadow vegetation in sandy soils on the tops of some of the hills. This contains flora between a restinga and altitude field environment, including bromeliaceae groups interspersed with small trees, clumps of cyperaceae, orchidaceae and epiphytic bromeliads.

There is a high incidence of rare species of mammals, reptiles and amphibians. Threatened species include northern muriqui (Brachyteles hypoxanthus), Bahia tyrannulet (Phylloscartes beckeri) and cougar (Puma concolor). Bird species include the black hawk-eagle (Spizaetus tyrannus), ornate hawk-eagle (Spizaetus ornatus), mantled hawk (Pseudastur polionotus), solitary tinamou (Tinamus solitarius), cinnamon-vented piha (Lipaugus lanioides) and white-eared parakeet (Pyrrhura leucotis).

== Sources ==
- Melo, Fabiano R. (April 2005), "A Reserva Biológica Federal da Mata Escura e Sua Importânciavcomo Unidade de Conservação para os Primatas do Médio Rio Jequitinhonha, Minas Gerais", Neotropical Primates (in Portuguese), 13 (1), Conservation International: 26, doi:10.1896/1413-4705.13.1.26
- Rebio Mata Escura (in Portuguese), ICMBio: Chico Mendes Institute for Biodiversity Conservation
- REBIO da Mata Escura (in Portuguese), ISA: Instituto Socioambiental
- Reserva Biológica da Mata Escura (in Portuguese), Via Rural, archived from the original on 2018-01-14
- Unidade de Conservação: Reserva Biológica da Mata Escura (in Portuguese), MMA: Ministério do Meio Ambiente
