= Santa Maria do Salto =

Municipality in Minas Gerais, Brazil

Coordinates: 16°14′56″S 40°08′56″W

- Municipality
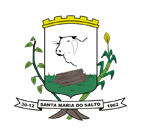
- Flag Coat of arms

- Location in Minas Gerais

- Location in Brazil
- Country: Brazil
- Region: Southeast
- State: Minas Gerais
- Intermediate Geographic Region: Teófilo Otoni
- Immediate Geographic Region: Almenara

Area
  - Total: 440.605 km^{2} (170.119 sq mi)
- Elevation: 220 m (720 ft)

Population (2022)
  - Total: 4,755
  - Density: 10.79/km^{2} (27.9/sq mi)
- Demonym: santa-mariense
- Time zone: UTC−3 (BRT)
- Website: santamariadosalto.mg.gov.br

Santa Maria do Salto is a municipality in the northeast of the Brazilian state of Minas Gerais. Its population in 2020 was 5,217 inhabitants in a total area of 442 km^{2}. Santa Maria do Salto city belongs to the Immediate Geographic Region of Almenara. The elevation of the municipal seat is 220 meters. It became a municipality in 1962. This municipality is located south of the Jequitinhonha River and is bordered by the state of Bahia on the east. Neighboring municipalities are: Eunápolis, Salto da Divisa, and Jacinto. There are poor highway connections with Salto da Divisa, 68 km to the northeast; Salto da Divisa then has paved connections to the important BR-101, 48 km to the east.

== Economics and social indicators ==
The main economic activities are cattle raising, and subsistence farming. The GDP in 2005 was R$16.53 million (US$6.79 million). There were no banking agencies listed in 2006. There were 88 automobiles in 2007. The main cash crop was coffee and there was production of bananas and sugarcane. In the health sector there were 02 health clinics and no hospitals. The score on the Municipal Human Development Index was 0.633 (medium). This ranked Santa Maria do Salto 784 out of 853 municipalities in the state, with Poços de Caldas in first place with 0.841 and Setubinha in last place with 0.568.

In 2006 there were 201 rural farms with 600 hectares of planted area. Most of the rural area was natural pasture or woodland. Only three of the farms had tractors. There was a cattle herd of 8,000 heads, the cattle being raised mainly for meat.

== See also ==
- List of municipalities in Minas Gerais
