= Immediate Geographic Region of Almenara =

Urban administrative region in Minas Gerais, Brazil

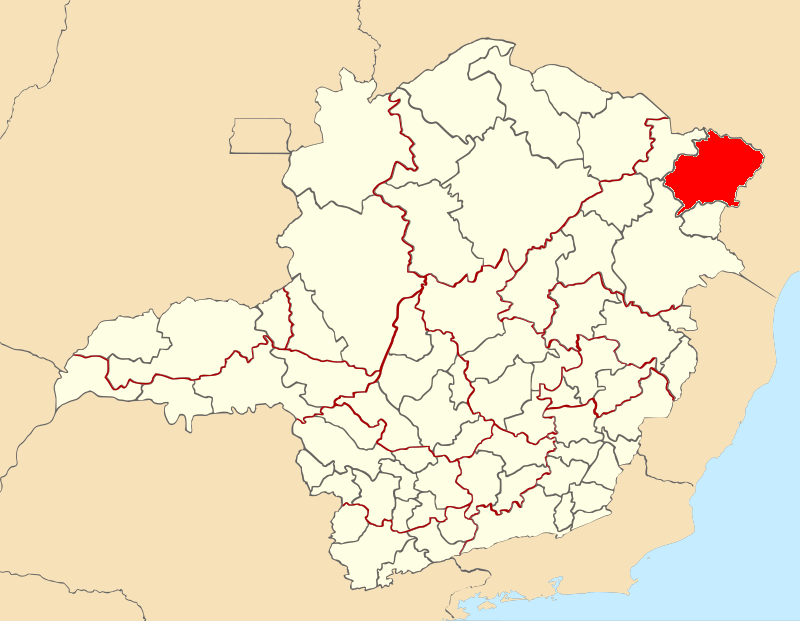
Immediate Geographic Region of Almenara, in the state of Minas Gerais, Brazil.

The Immediate Geographic Region of Almenara is one of the 7 immediate geographic regions in the Intermediate Geographic Region of Teófilo Otoni, one of the 70 immediate geographic regions in the Brazilian state of Minas Gerais and one of the 509 of Brazil, created by the National Institute of Geography and Statistics (IBGE) in 2017.

== Municipalities ==
It comprises 14 municipalities.

- Almenara
- Bandeira
- Felisburgo
- Jacinto
- Jequitinhonha
- Joaíma
- Jordânia
- Mata Verde
- Palmópolis
- Rio do Prado
- Rubim
- Salto da Divisa
- Santa Maria do Salto
- Santo Antônio do Jacinto

== See also ==
- List of Intermediate and Immediate Geographic Regions of Minas Gerais
