= Caravelas Airport =

Airport serving Caravelas, Brazil

Caravelas Airport Aeroporto de Caravelas
- IATA: CRQ; ICAO: SBCV

Summary
- Airport type: Public
- Operator: Brazilian Air Force (1945-2015); Bahia (2015-?); São Francisco (?–2025); Seinfra (2025–present)
- Serves: Caravelas
- Closed: 2022 (temporarily)
- Time zone: BRT (UTC−03:00)
- Elevation AMSL: 11 m (36 ft)
- Coordinates: 17°39′02″S 039°15′16″W

Map
- Location in Brazil

Runways
Direction	Length		Surface
Direction	m	ft	Surface
06/24	1,530	5,020	Asphalt
18/36	1,150	3,773	Asphalt
- Sources: ANAC

Caravelas Airport (IATA: CRQ, ICAO: SBCV) is the airport serving Caravelas, Brazil. It was closed in 2022.

== History ==
The airport was inaugurated in the 1940s as an American Air Force Base and it was renovated between 2010 and 2014 by the Brazilian Army.

On August 22, 2015 the administration of the facility was handed over to the State of Bahia.

On January 20, 2022 the operational license of the facility was revoked.

Previously operated by Concessionária São Francisco Administração Aeroportuário e Rodoviário, since August 16, 2025 it is administrated by the State of Bahia through its Infrastructure Secretariat Seinfra.

== Accidents and incidents ==
- 9 May 1996: a Brazilian Air Force Embraer C-95 Bandeirante registration FAB-2295 crashed during take-off. All crew of 4 died.

== Access ==
The airport is located 10 km (6 mi) from downtown Caravelas.

== See also ==
- List of airports in Brazil
