= Felisburgo =

Human settlement in Brazil

Coordinates: 16°39′S 40°46′W

Bandeira
- Municipality
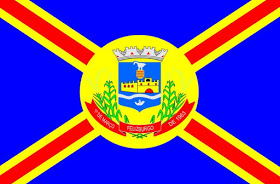
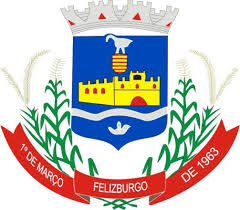
- Flag Coat of arms

- Location in Minas Gerais

- Location in Brazil
- Country: Brazil
- Region: Southeast
- State: Minas Gerais
- Intermediate Geographic Region: Teófilo Otoni
- Immediate Geographic Region: Almenara

Area
  - Total: 596.215 km^{2} (230.200 sq mi)
- Elevation: 638 m (2,093 ft)

Population (2022)
  - Total: 6,489
  - Density: 10.88/km^{2} (28.2/sq mi)
- Demonym: felisburguense
- Time zone: UTC−3 (BRT)
- Website: felisburgo.mg.gov.br

Felisburgo is a Brazilian municipality located in the northeast of the state of Minas Gerais.The population as of 2020 was estimated to be 7,504 people living in a total area of 594 km^{2}. The city belongs to the Immediate Geographic Region of Almenara. Its elevation is 638 meters. It became a municipality in 1962.

== Economics and geography ==
The main economic activities are cattle raising and the cultivation of coffee, sugarcane and corn. The GDP in 2006 was R$19.98 million (US$9.19 million). There was 01 banking agency as of 2007. In the same year there were 167 automobiles, which was a ratio of one automobile for every 400 people. In the rural area there were 273 producers of which only 33 had tractors. There were 27,000 head of cattle in 2006. Neighboring municipalities are: Rio do Prado, Rubim, Jequitinhonha, Joaíma and Fronteira dos Vales. This municipality is isolated from major population centers and suffers from drought and poor soils.

== Social indicators ==
- Municipal Human Development Index: .642 (2000)
- State ranking: 766 out of 853 municipalities as of 2000
- National ranking: 3,884 out of 5,138 municipalities as of 2000
- Degree of urbanization: 72.84% (2000)--the rate for Minas Gerais was 82.0%
- Illiteracy rate: 36.16% (15 years old or older) The rate for Minas Gerais was 11.96%; the rate for Brazil was 13.63%
- Urban area covered by sewage system: 70.30%--the rate for Minas Gerais was 81.39%
- Health clinics, health centers, and hospitals: 02, 02, 01, respectively, with 59 beds

== See also ==
- List of municipalities in Minas Gerais
