= Jacinto, Minas Gerais =

Jacinto
- Municipality
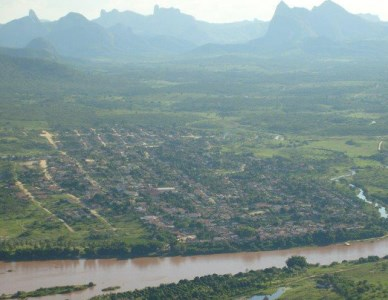
- Aerial View of Jacinto

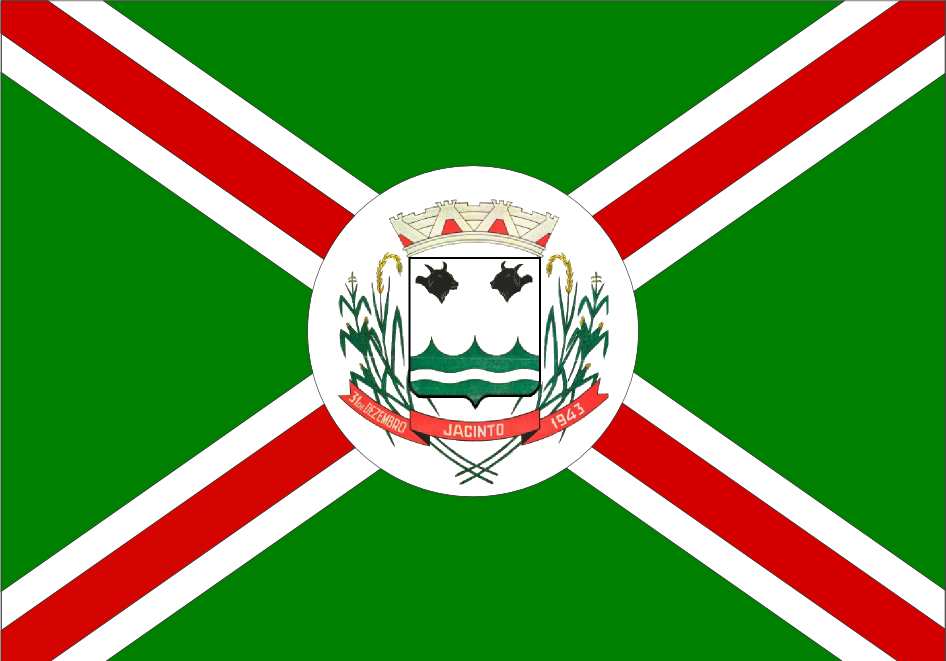
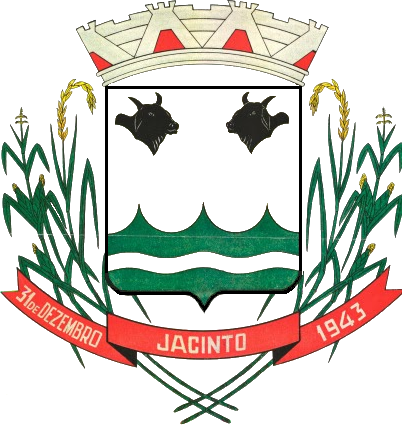
- Flag Coat of arms
- Nickname: Jaça
- Location in Minas Gerais

- Location in Brazil
- Coordinates: 16°08′38″S 40°17′34″W
- Country: Brazil
- Region: Southeast
- State: Minas Gerais
- Intermediate Geographic Region: Teófilo Otoni
- Immediate Geographic Region: Almenara
- Incorporated (municipality): December 31, 1943

Government
  - Mayor: Carlos Dantez Ferraz de Mello

Area
  - Total: 1,393.609 km^{2} (538.075 sq mi)
- Elevation: 180 m (590 ft)

Population (2020)
  - Total: 12,323
  - Density: 8.71/km^{2} (22.6/sq mi)
- Demonym: Jacintense
- Time zone: UTC−3 (BRT)
- CEP postal code: 39930-000
- Area code: 33
- HDI (2010): 0,620
- Website: Official website

Jacinto is a Brazilian municipality located in the northeast of the state of Minas Gerais. Jacinto is located on the right bank of the Jequitinhonha River. It is 44 kilometers east of Almenara.

Supposedly, the city name is a homage to an old settler named Jacinto who lived in the city around the 1910s.

== See also ==
- List of municipalities in Minas Gerais
