= Bandeira, Minas Gerais =

Municipality of Brazil in Minas Gerais

Coordinates: 15°53′08″S 40°33′33″W

Bandeira
- Municipality
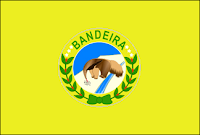
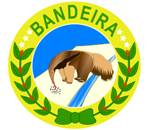
- Flag Coat of arms

- Location in Minas Gerais

- Location in Brazil
- Country: Brazil
- Region: Southeast
- State: Minas Gerais
- Intermediate Geographic Region: Teófilo Otoni
- Immediate Geographic Region: Almenara

Area
  - Total: 483.789 km^{2} (186.792 sq mi)
- Elevation: 292 m (958 ft)

Population (2022)
  - Total: 4,741
  - Density: 9.8/km^{2} (25/sq mi)
- Demonym: bandeirense
- Time zone: UTC−3 (BRT)
- Website: bandeira.mg.gov.br

Bandeira is a Brazilian municipality located in the state of Minas Gerais. Its population as of 2020 was estimated to be 4,766 people living in a total area of 484 km^{2}. The city belongs to the Immediate Geographic Region of Almenara. Bandeira became a municipality in 1962.

== Economy and geography ==
Bandeira is located 37 km northeast of Almenara, just south of the boundary with the state of Bahia. Highway connections are poor making the region isolated. The elevation was 292 meters. The main economic activities are cattle raising (22,000 head in 2006) and the cultivation of cacao, oranges, sugarcane and corn. The GDP in 2006 was R$15.05 million (US$6.92 million). There were no banking agencies as of 2007. In the same year there were 63 automobiles. This municipality is isolated from major population centers and suffers from drought and poor soils.

== Social indicators ==
- Municipal Human Development Index: 0.619 (2000)
- State ranking: 806 out of 853 municipalities as of 2000
- National ranking: 4,325 out of 5,138 municipalities as of 2000
- Degree of urbanization: 44.02% (2000)--the rate for Minas Gerais was 82.0%
- Illiteracy rate: 37.99% (15 years old or older)(Data from 2000) The rate for Minas Gerais was 11.96%; the rate for Brazil was 13.63%
- Urban area covered by sewage system: 80.00%--the rate for Minas Gerais was 81.39%
- Health clinics, health centers, and hospitals: 2, 1, 0, respectively.

== See also ==
- List of municipalities in Minas Gerais
