= Jequitinhonha (mesoregion) =

Mesoregion of Jequitinhonha
- Mesoregion
- Location of the Mesoregion of Jequitinhonha
- Coordinates: 16°51′00″S 42°04′12″W
- Country: Brazil
- Region: Southeast
- State: Minas Gerais

Area
  - Total: 50,143.249 km^{2} (19,360.417 sq mi)

Population (2010/IBGE)
  - Total: 981,121
  - Density: 23.8/km^{2} (62/sq mi)
- Time zone: UTC-3 (BRT)
  - Summer (DST): UTC-2 (BRST)
- Area code: +55 33, 38

Vale do Jequitinhonha (English: Jequitinhonha River valley), or simply Jequitinhonha, is one of the twelve mesoregions of the Brazilian state of Minas Gerais. It is composed of 51 municipalities spread across five microregions.
