= Palmópolis =

Municipality of Brazil

Coordinates: 16°45′S 40°25′W

- Municipality
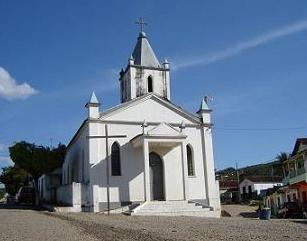
- Palmópolis' main church

- Location in Minas Gerais

- Location in Brazil
- Country: Brazil
- Region: Southeast
- State: Minas Gerais
- Intermediate Geographic Region: Teófilo Otoni
- Immediate Geographic Region: Almenara

Area
  - Total: 433.154 km^{2} (167.242 sq mi)
- Elevation: 600 m (2,000 ft)

Population (2022)
  - Total: 6,301
  - Density: 14.55/km^{2} (37.7/sq mi)
- Demonym: palmopolense
- Time zone: UTC−3 (BRT)
- Website: palmopolis.mg.gov.br

Palmópolis is a municipality in the northeast of the Brazilian state of Minas Gerais. Its population in 2020 was 5,349 inhabitants in a total area of 436 km^{2} (168 sq mi).

== Overview ==
Palmópolis belongs to the Almenara statistical microregion. The elevation of the municipal seat is 600 meters. It became a municipality in 1993. This municipality is located on the Braço River, 10 km. west of the state boundary with Espírito Santo.

The main economic activities are cattle raising, and subsistence farming. The GDP was R$20.13 million (US$8.27 million) in 2005. There was 01 banking agency in 2006. There were 95 automobiles in 2007. The main crop was coffee. In the health sector there were 03 health clinics. The score on the Municipal Human Development Index was 0.615 (medium). This ranked Palmópolis 811 out of 853 municipalities in the state, with Poços de Caldas in first place with 0.841 and Setubinha in last place with 0.568. See Frigoletto for the complete list.

- Degree of urbanization: 50.30% (2000-the national average was 81.75%)
- Illiteracy rate: 31.00% (2000—the national average was 13.63)
- Infant mortality rate: 33.33% (2000—the national average was 18.91)
- Life expectancy: 65.4 (average of male and female) (2000)
- Percentage of urban area with sewer connections: 20.70% (2000—the national average was 69.52%)

== See also ==
- List of municipalities in Minas Gerais
