= Caravelas =

Municipality of Bahia, Brazil

- Municipality
- Flag Coat of arms

- Location in Bahia

- Location of Caravelas in Brazil
- Coordinates: 17.732°S 39.266°W
- Country: Brazil
- State: Bahia

Area
  - Total: 2,377.889 km^{2} (918.108 sq mi)
- Elevation: 10 m (33 ft)

Population (2020)
  - Total: 22,093
  - Density: 9.2910/km^{2} (24.064/sq mi)
- Time zone: UTC−3 (BRT)

Caravelas is a city of about 20,000 inhabitants in southern Bahia, Brazil, a few miles above the mouth of the Caravelas River.

Caravelas was founded in 1581 by Portuguese settlers. It was once the centre of a flourishing whale fishery. It is the port of the Bahia-Minas Railway. Caravelas is the nearest town to the uninhabited Abrolhos Archipelago. The city contains part of the Cassurubá Extractive Reserve, a 100,768-hectare (249,000-acre) sustainable use conservation unit that protects an area of mangroves, river and sea where shellfish are harvested.

The city is served by Caravelas Airport.

== See also ==
- Abrolhos Marine National Park
