= Immediate Geographic Region of Araçuaí =

Urban administrative region in Minas Gerais, Brazil

Immediate Geographic Region of Araçuaí, in the state of Minas Gerais, Brazil.

The Immediate Geographic Region of Araçuaí is one of the 7 immediate geographic regions in the Intermediate Geographic Region of Teófilo Otoni, one of the 70 immediate geographic regions in the Brazilian state of Minas Gerais and one of the 509 of Brazil, created by the National Institute of Geography and Statistics (IBGE) in 2017.

== Municipalities ==
It comprises 8 municipalities.

- Araçuaí
- Berilo
- Coronel Murta
- Francisco Badaró
- Itinga
- Jenipapo de Minas
- José Gonçalves de Minas
- Virgem da Lapa

== See also ==
- List of Intermediate and Immediate Geographic Regions of Minas Gerais
