= Jordânia =

Human settlement in Brazil

Coordinates: 15°54′S 40°11′W

- Municipality
- Location in Minas Gerais

- Location in Brazil
- Country: Brazil
- Region: Southeast
- State: Minas Gerais
- Intermediate Geographic Region: Teófilo Otoni
- Immediate Geographic Region: Almenara

Area
  - Total: 546,705 km^{2} (211,084 sq mi)
- Elevation: 292 m (958 ft)

Population (2022)
  - Total: 13,888
  - Density: 18.85/km^{2} (48.8/sq mi)
- Time zone: UTC−3 (BRT)
- Website: Prefeitura de Jordânia

Jordânia is a Brazilian municipality located in the northeast of the state of Minas Gerais. The city belongs to the Immediate Geographic Region of Almenara. As of 2020 the population was 10,842 in a total area of 549 km^{2}. Jordânia is located on the state boundary with Bahia. It is linked to the major population center of Almenara by poor roads. The elevation is 198 meters. It became a municipality in 1948.

== Economy ==
The main economic activities are cattle raising and subsistence farming. The GDP was R$27,629,000 in 2005. The main cash crop was coffee. There were 143 automobiles in 2007. No banking agencies were listed for that year. In the rural zone there were 611 producers with a total planted area of 1,500 hectares. Most of the land was in natural pasture or woodland. Only 10 of the farms had tractors in 2006.

== Social indicators ==
- Municipal Human Development Index: .647 (2000)
- State ranking: 754 out of 853 municipalities as of 2000
- National ranking: 3,818 out of 5,138 municipalities as of 2000
- Degree of urbanization: 71.55% (2000)--the rate for Minas Gerais was 82.0%
- Illiteracy rate: 30.16% (15 years old or older) The rate for Minas Gerais was 11.96%; the rate for Brazil was 13.63%
- Urban area covered by sewage system: 79.10%--the rate for Minas Gerais was 81.39%
- Infant mortality rate: 15.15—the rate for Minas Gerais was 17.40
- Health centers, and hospitals: 03 health centers and 01 hospital with 40 beds.

== See also ==
- List of municipalities in Minas Gerais
