= Jequitinhonha =

Coordinates: 16°26′S 41°00′W

- Municipality
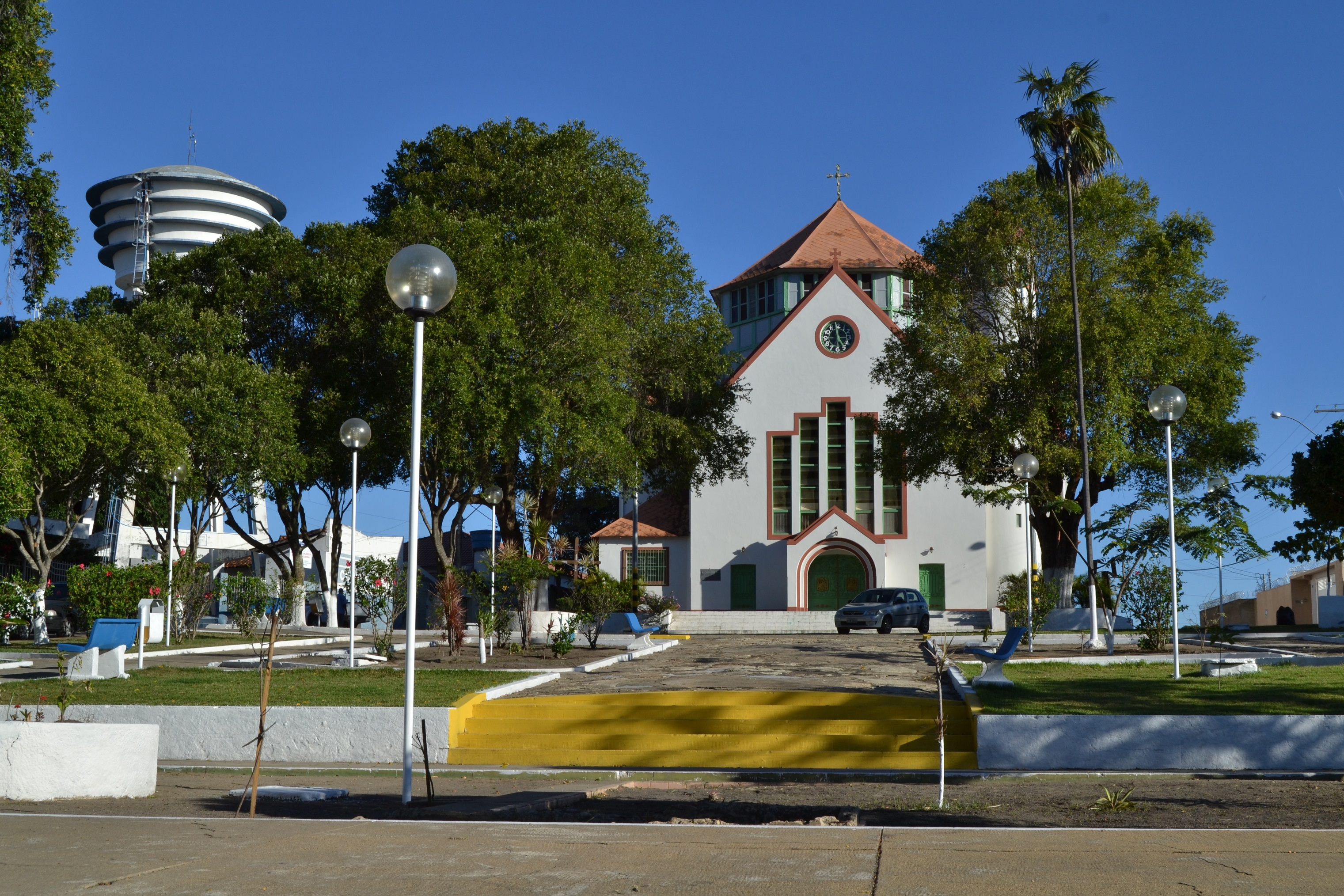
- Church of St. Michael and Souls in Jequitinhonha

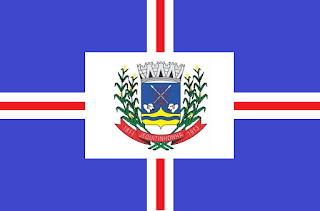
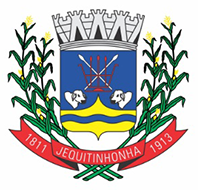
- Flag Coat of arms

- Country: Brazil
- State: Minas Gerais
- Intermediate Geographic Region: Teófilo Otoni
- Immediate Geographic Region: Almenara
- Incorporated: 30 August 1911

Government
  - Mayor: Nilo Barbuda Souto (PDT)

Area
  - Total: 3,514 km^{2} (1,357 sq mi)

Population (2020)
  - Total: 25,474
  - Density: 7.3/km^{2} (19/sq mi)
- Demonym: Jequitinhonhense
- Time zone: UTC−3 (BRT)
- Postal Code: 39960-000
- Area code(s): +55 33
- Website: jequitinhonha.mg.gov.br

Jequitinhonha (Brazilian Portuguese: [ʒekitʃiˈɲõɲɐ]) is a Brazilian municipality located in the northeast of the state of Minas Gerais.

== Geography ==
The population as of 2020 was estimated to be 25,474 people living in a total area of 3,518 km^{2}. The city belongs to the mesoregion of Jequitinhonha and to the microregion of Almenara.

Jequitinhonha is located on the river of the same name. The elevation is 223 meters. It became a municipality in 1911. The distance to the state capital, Belo Horizonte is 582 km.

Neighboring municipalities are: Joaíma, Felisburgo, Rubim, Almenara and Pedra Azul.

The municipality contains most of the 50,890 hectares (125,800 acres) Mata Escura Biological Reserve, created in 2003.

== Economy ==
The main economic activities are cattle raising and the cultivation of coffee, sugarcane and corn. The GDP in 2006 was R$66,471,000. There were 02 banking agencies as of 2007. In the same year there were 699 automobiles, which was a ratio of one automobile for every 30 people. In the rural area there were 1,905 producers of which only 51 had tractors. There were 88,000 head of cattle in 2006. This municipality is isolated from major population centers and suffers from drought and poor soils.

== Social indicators ==
- Municipal Human Development Index: .668 (2000)
- State ranking: 679 out of 853 municipalities as of 2000
- National ranking: 3,492 out of 5,138 municipalities as of 2000
- Degree of urbanization: 70.21% (2000)--the rate for Minas Gerais was 82.0%
- Illiteracy rate: 33.68% (15 years old or older) The rate for Minas Gerais was 11.96%; the rate for Brazil was 13.63%
- Urban area covered by sewage system: 38.80%--the rate for Minas Gerais was 81.39%
- Health centers and hospitals: 08 health centers and 01 hospital with 76 beds

== See also ==
- List of municipalities in Minas Gerais
