= Jequitinhonha River =

Jequitinhonha
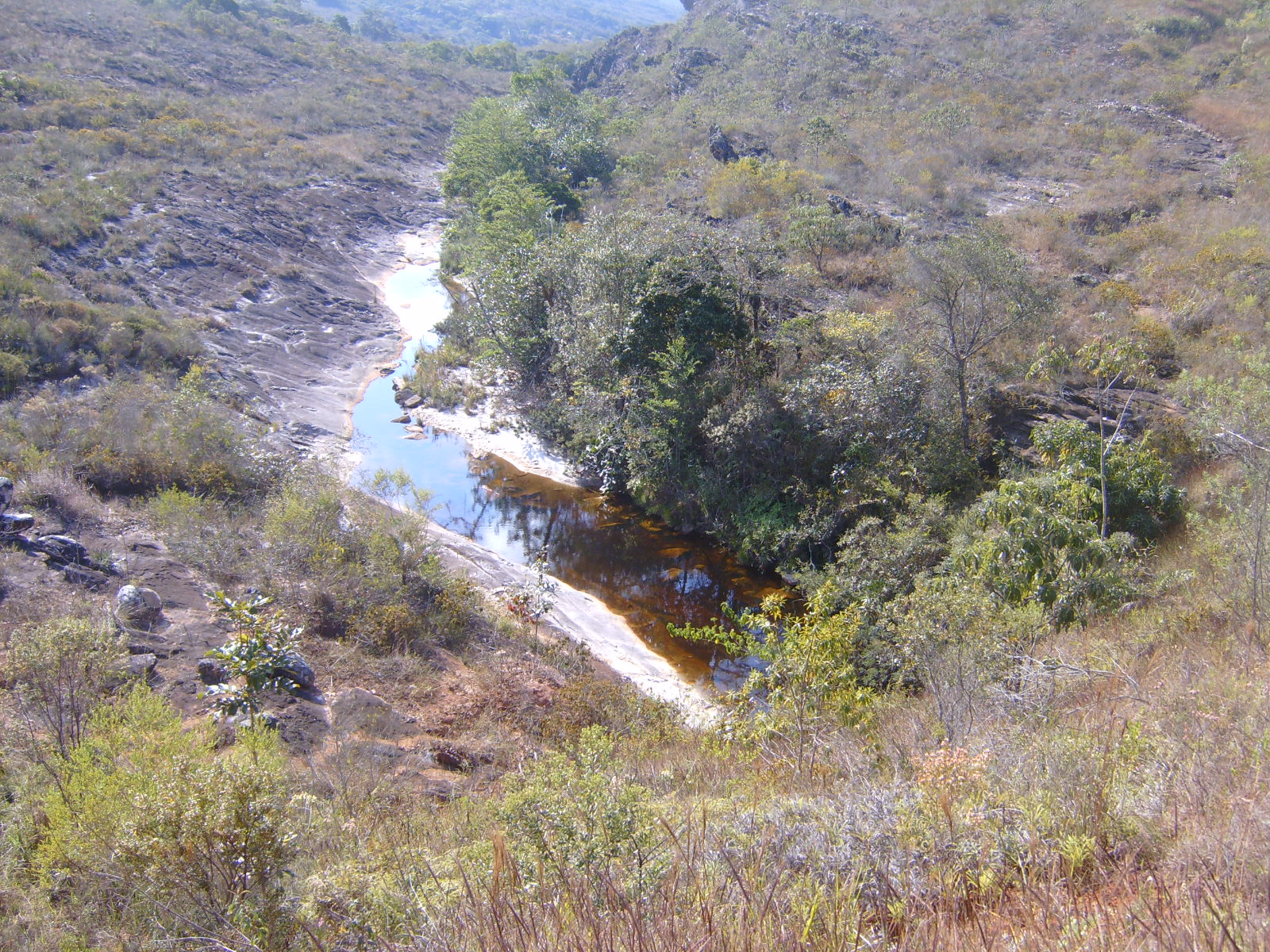
- Source of the river in Serro

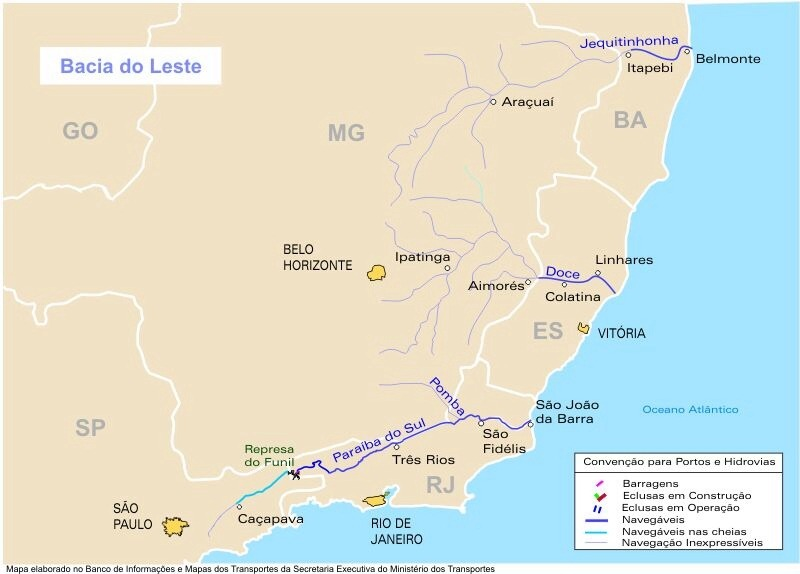
- Southeastern Brazil with major rivers highlighted; Jequitinhonha is the northernmost

Location
- Country: Brazil

Physical characteristics
- Source: Espinhaço Mountains
  - location: Diamantina, Minas Gerais
  - elevation: 1,200 m (3,900 ft)
- Mouth: Atlantic Ocean
  - location: Belmonte, Bahia
  - coordinates: 15°51′00″S 38°51′27″W
  - elevation: Sea level
- Length: 1,090 km (680 mi)
- Basin size: 78,451 km^{2} (30,290 sq mi)

Basin features
- Waterfalls: Cachoeira do Salto Grande

The Jequitinhonha River (Brazilian Portuguese pronunciation: [ʒekitʃiˈɲõɲɐ]) flows mainly through the Brazilian state of Minas Gerais. Its source lies near Diamantina in the Espinhaço Mountains at an elevation of 1,200 metres (3,900 ft), after which it flows northward and then east-northeastward across the uplands. At Salto da Divisa, it is interrupted by the Cachoeira (falls) do Salto Grande, 43 metres (141 ft) high. The river descends to the coastal plain at the city of Jequitinhonha, and empties into the Atlantic Ocean at Belmonte in Bahia state after a course of approximately 1,090 kilometres (680 mi). The main tributaries are the Araçuaí, Piauí, São Miguel, Itacambiruçu, Salinas, São Pedro, and São Francisco.

The electrical company of Minas Gerais (CEMIG) constructed a hydroelectric plant on the river between Berilo and Grão Mogol. The Usina Presidente Juscelino Kubitschek, the hydroelectric plant powered by Irapé Dam, has an installed capacity of 360 MW and regulates the waters of the river which periodically flood. CEMIG began the work in 2002 and in April 2003 diverted the river to two tunnels with a length of more than 1.2 km (three-quarters of a mile). The dam and power station were completed in 2006.

== Jequitinhonha Valley ==
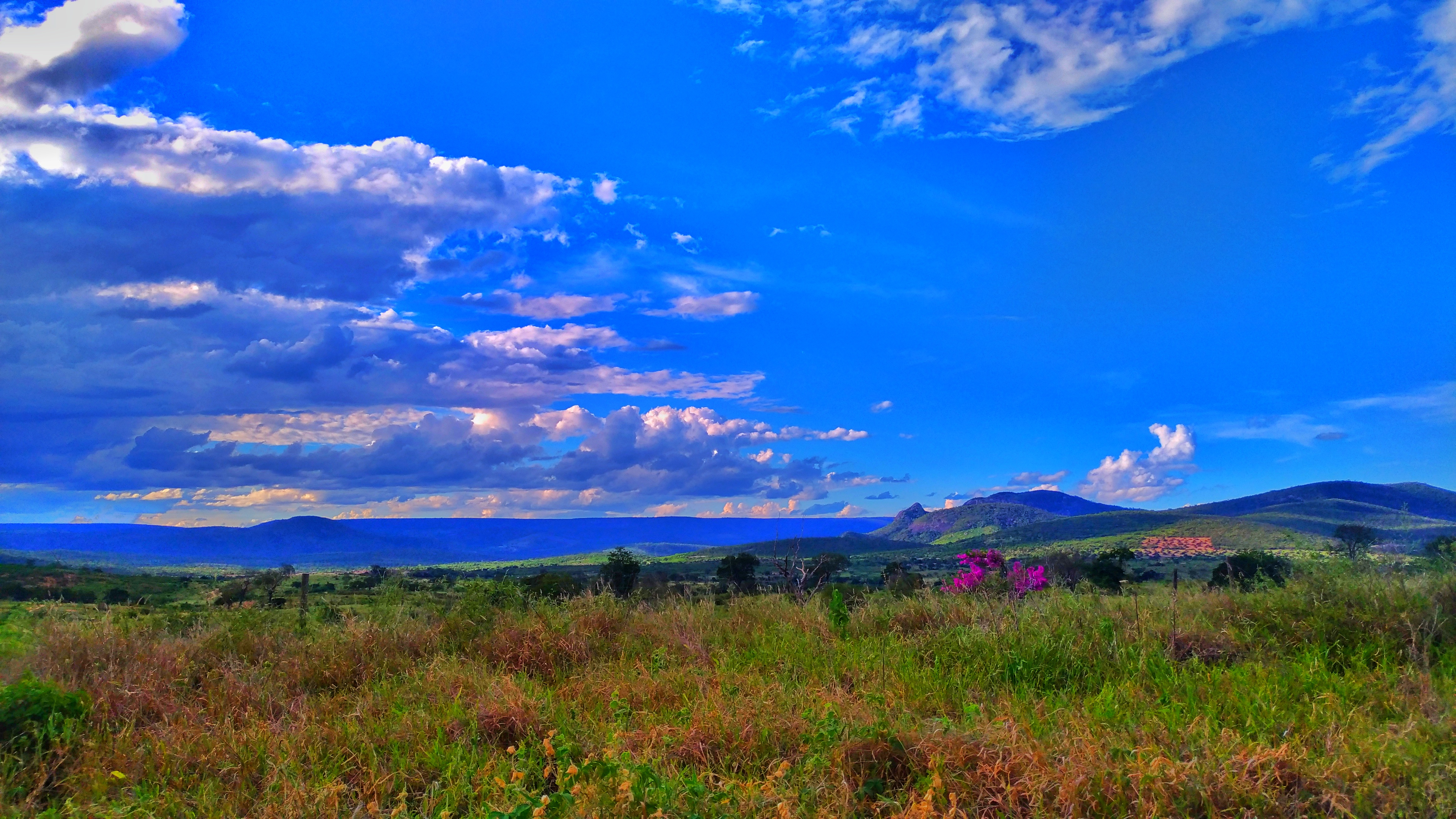
Typical vegetation of the Jequitinhonha valley

The valley of the Jequitinhonha covers approximately 85,000 square kilometres (33,000 sq mi), and has an approximate population of one million people, distributed in about 80 municipalities. The most populous of these is Diamantina (47,702 in 2022) located on the upper Jequitinhonha. Other important cities in the Jequitinhonha valley are Capelinha, Araçuaí and Almenara, and a large part of its population lives in rural areas. The valley is known for its gemstone deposits, historic towns, traditional handicrafts, and distinctive landscapes, which have been featured in the works of Brazilian author João Guimarães Rosa.

The alluvial deposits of the Jequitinhonha River produced most of Brazil’s diamonds, though peak activity was between 1740 and 1830.

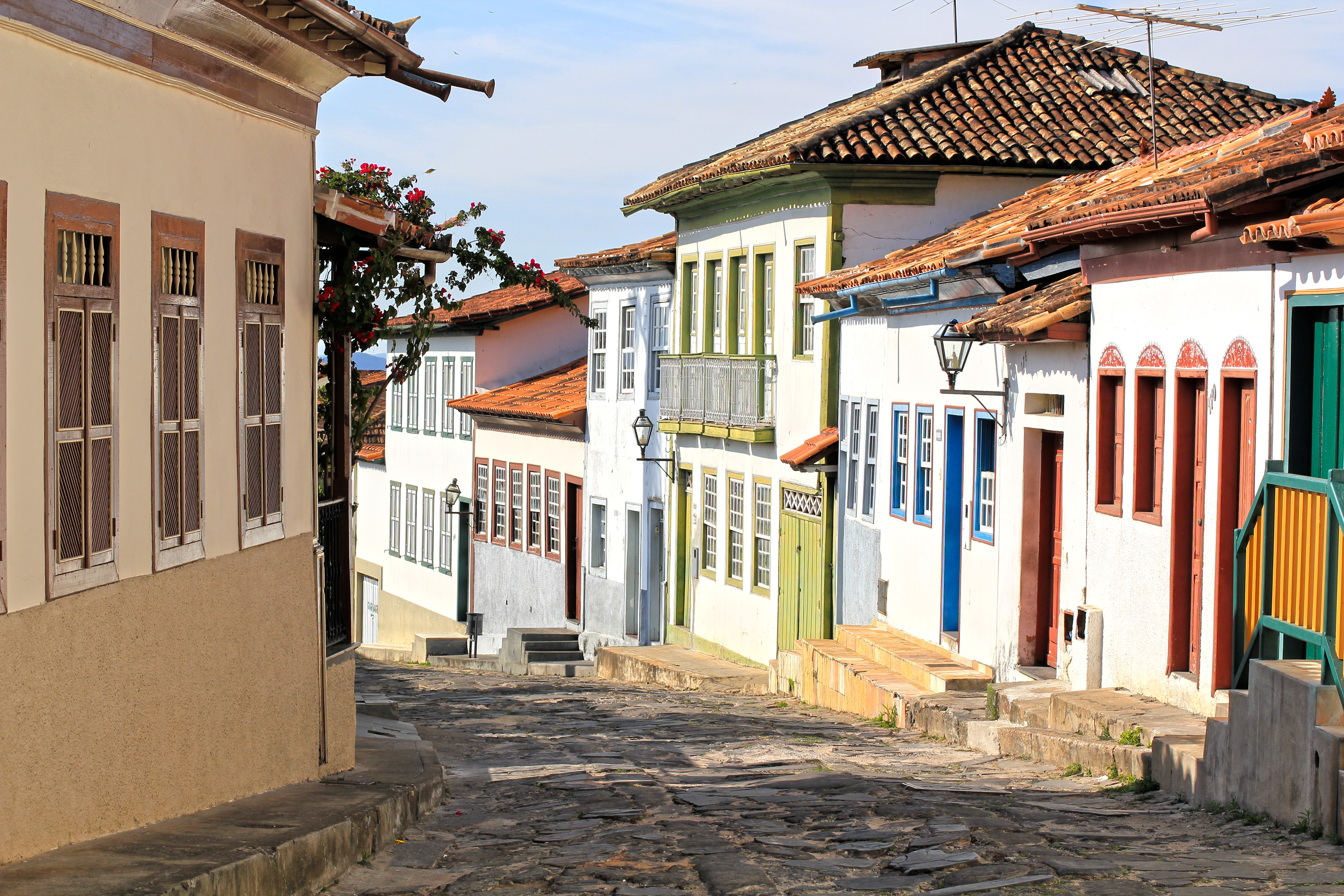
Rua do Rosário, Historic Centre of Diamantina

Before European colonization, the Jequitinhonha Valley was inhabited by indigenous groups such as the Botocudos, Aranãs, and Tocoiós. Portuguese explorers arrived in the 16th century, followed by gold and diamond rushes in the 18th century, which attracted settlers and spurred conflicts with native populations. The region’s mineral wealth declined in the 19th century due to cheaper African diamonds and droughts, leading to economic collapse. By the mid-20th century, the valley became synonymous with poverty, prompting state-led development efforts like CODEVALE in 1964, though eucalyptus monoculture and controversial policies failed to alleviate hardships. Recent projects, such as the Irapé Hydroelectric Dam (2006) and lithium mining, offer new economic prospects for the region.

The Jequitinhonha Valley is home to diverse traditional communities that preserve remnants of Portuguese, African, and Indigenous cultures. As a result, the region boasts many cultural expressions showcasing the syncretism of these influences, such as the Festival of Our Lady of the Rosary of the Black Men in Chapada do Norte, the Festival of Our Lady of the Rosary in Minas Novas, distinctive clay crafts featuring both utilitarian pottery and sculpted animal and doll figures, traditional Carnival celebrations, and its unique cuisine.

== See also ==
- List of rivers of Bahia
