= Almenara, Minas Gerais =

Almenara
- Municipality
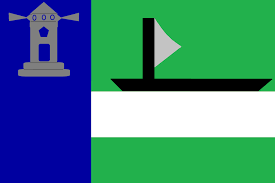
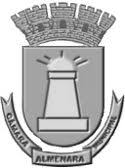
- Flag Coat of arms

- Location in Minas Gerais

- Location in Brazil
- Coordinates: 16°11′02″S 40°41′38″W
- Country: Brazil
- Region: Southeast
- State: Minas Gerais
- Intermediate Geographic Region: Teófilo Otoni
- Immediate Geographic Region: Almenara
- Incorporated (municipality): 13 January 1938

Government
  - Mayor: Ademir Gobira

Area
  - Total: 2,300.797 km^{2} (888.343 sq mi)
- Elevation: 188 m (617 ft)

Population (2020)
  - Total: 42,143
  - Density: 16.9/km^{2} (44/sq mi)
- Demonym: Almenarense
- Time zone: UTC−3 (BRT)
- CEP postal code: 39900-000
- Area code: 33
- HDI (2010): 0,642
- Website: Official website

Almenara, is a municipality in the northeast of the Brazilian state of Minas Gerais. Situated on the Jequitinhonha River it is the largest city in that river valley. Its 2020 population was estimated at 42,143 and the municipal area was 2,301 km^{2} (888 sq mi). It was founded on 13 January 1938. In 1981 the city was made the seat of the Roman Catholic Diocese of Almenara.

== Geography ==
The elevation is 248 meters. The postal code is 39900-000. The distance to the state capital, Belo Horizonte, is 744 kilometers. Almenara is also the center of the Immediate Geographic Region of Almenara.

The municipality contains a small amount of the 50,890-hectare (125,800-acre) Mata Escura Biological Reserve, created in 2003. The river beach of Almenara was once considered one of the most beautiful in the country. Today, with mining in the tributaries of the Jequitinhonha its waters are polluted with mercury and oil. Its clean sands have become dark and dirty.

The hill called Morro do Cruzeiro is used for hang gliding. There is also an arched bridge with a span of 300 meters crossing the river. When the river is full some people dive off the bridge.

== Economy ==
The main economic activity is cattle raising with over 89,000 head of cattle counted in 2006. Agriculture is important with the main crops being coffee, coconuts, banana, corn, and sugarcane. There were 4 banking agencies in 2006. There were 2 private hospitals with 180 beds (2005). In the rural area there were 983 farms in 2006. More than 3,000 people depended on agriculture for a living. Only 33 farms had tractors, which was a ratio of one tractor for 30 farms.

== Social indicators ==
- Municipal Human Development Index: .668 (2000)
- State ranking: 680 out of 853 municipalities as of 2000
- National ranking: 3,496 out of 5,138 municipalities as of 2000
- Degree of urbanization: 78.48% (2000)--the rate for Minas Gerais was 82.0%
- Illiteracy rate: 30.66% (15 years old or older) The rate for Minas Gerais was 11.96%; the rate for Brazil was 13.63%
- Urban area covered by sewage system: 80.80%--the rate for Minas Gerais was 81.39%
- Health centers and hospitals: 13 health centers and 02 hospitals with 172 beds

== See also ==
- List of municipalities in Minas Gerais
