= Mantiqueira Mountains =

Mountain range in Brazil

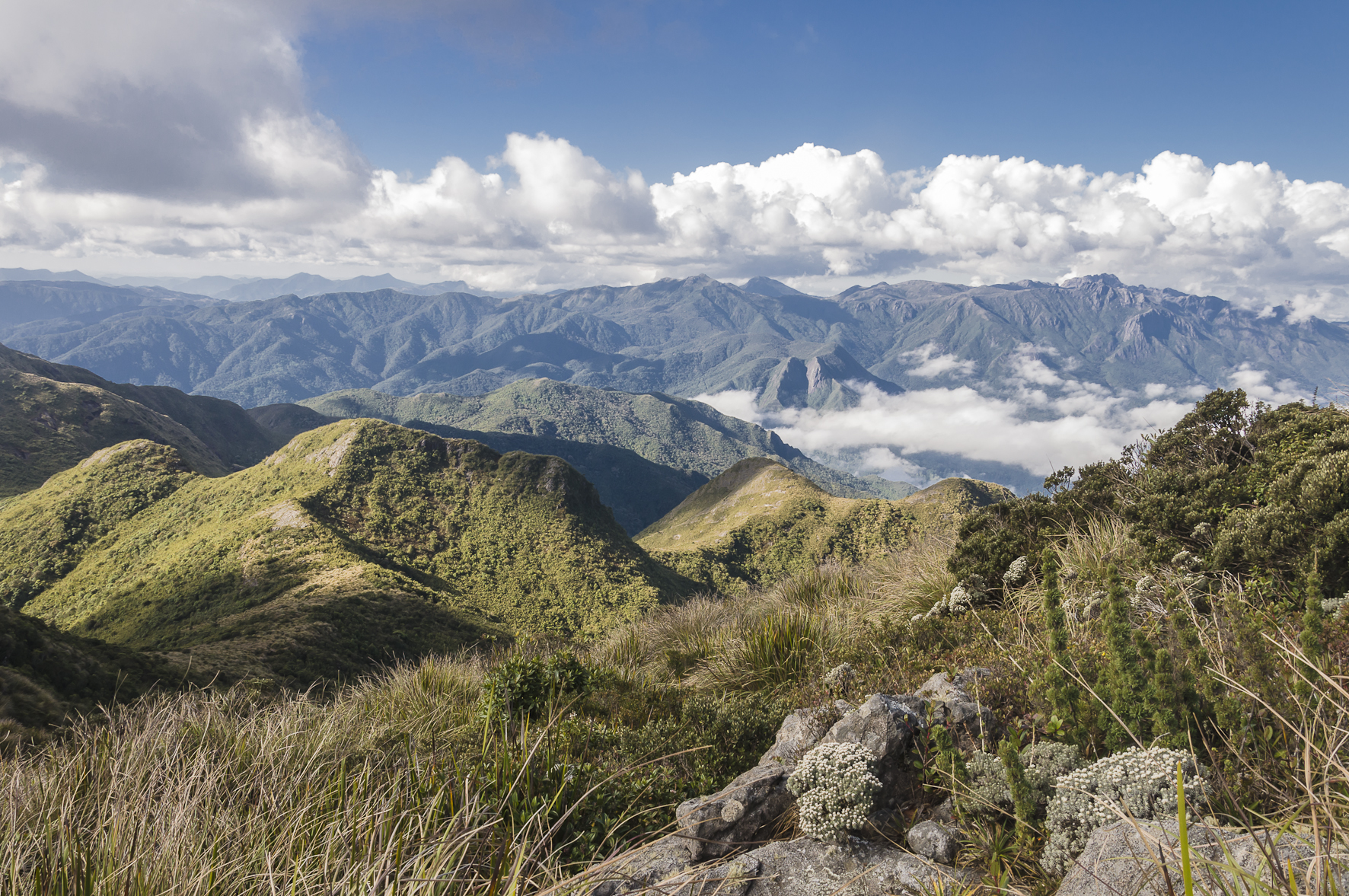

Highest point
- Peak: Pedra da Mina
- Elevation: 2,798 m (9,180 ft)
- Coordinates: 22°25′S 44°51′W

Naming
- Native name: Serra da Mantiqueira (Portuguese)

Geography
- Location within Brazil
- Country: Brazil
- Region: Southeast
- Range coordinates: 22°00′S 44°45′W

The Mantiqueira Mountains (Portuguese: Serra da Mantiqueira [literally: Mantiqueira Mountains Chain]) are a mountain range in Southeastern Brazil, with parts in the states of São Paulo, Minas Gerais and Rio de Janeiro.

The name shows the range's great importance as a source of drinking water, and the waters supply a large number of cities in the southeast of Brazil. From its brooks are formed the Jaguari River, which supplies the northern region of Greater São Paulo; most left-bank tributaries of the Paraíba do Sul River, which crosses a densely populated and highly industrialized region; and the Grande River, which is the source of the Paraná River, one of the longest in South America and the river with the world's largest hydroelectric output, through a series of power plants way down the river to Argentina and Paraguay.

Many springs of mineral water lie in the regions of Caxambu and São Lourenço in Minas Gerais, and Campos do Jordão and Serra Negra in São Paulo.

== Ecology ==
The Serra da Mantiqueira is a part of the Atlantic Forest ecosystem. Despite the clearing of the land for livestock raising, the difficult access to many areas has made possible for sanctuaries of well-preserved forest to still exist, with trees such as the jacarandá, Spanish cedar, canjerana, guatambu, ipê, canela, angico, jequitibá, and also the araucaria, more typical of subtropical South America but found in the area because of altitude. At its closest point, the region is only 100 km (62 mi) from the city of São Paulo.

It is also the habitat of a varied fauna: pampas deer (locally known as veado campeiro), maned wolves (lobo guará), cougars (onça-parda or suçuarana), bush dogs (cachorro-vinagre), ocelots (jaguatirica), pacas, howler monkeys (bugio), and Atlantic titis (sauá) can still be found there. Birds of note are the azure jay, the toucan, the scaly-headed parrot (maitaca), the inhambu, the jacana, the seriema, and the crested caracara.

== Altitudes and climate ==
The Mantiqueira is a popular region for mountain climbers and trekkers, where in winter, which is the dry season, one can climb some of the highest peaks in the country:

- Pedra da Mina – 2,798 m (9,180 ft), between Passa Quatro (Minas Gerais), Lavrinhas and Queluz (São Paulo); only recently discovered by GPS measurement to be the highest point in the range, as well the highest of São Paulo state and the third highest in Minas Gerais.
- Pico das Agulhas Negras – 2,792 m (9,160 ft), in the Itatiaia National Park, between the states of Minas Gerais and Rio de Janeiro; formerly thought to be the highest in the range.
- Pico dos Três Estados – 2,665 m (8,743 ft), between the former two peaks, on the border tripoint of the states of Minas Gerais, São Paulo and Rio de Janeiro.
- Pico dos Marins – 2,421 m (7,942 ft), near Piquete, São Paulo, formerly incorrectly considered the state's highest point.
- Pedra de São Domingos – 2,050 m (6,730 ft), Córrego do Bom Jesus and Gonçalves, Minas Gerais.

Here are also some of the highest Brazilian cities:

- Campos do Jordão, São Paulo – 1,620 m (5,315 ft)
- Camanducaia, Minas Gerais – 1,550 m (5,085 ft)
- Senador Amaral, Minas Gerais – 1,505 m (4,938 ft)
- Bom Repouso, Minas Gerais – 1,370 m (4,495 ft)
- Maria da Fé, Minas Gerais – 1,280 m (4,199 ft)
- Munhoz, Minas Gerais – 1,260 m (4,134 ft)
- Gonçalves, Minas Gerais – 1,250 m (4,101 ft)
- Visconde de Mauá, Resende, Rio de Janeiro – 1,200 m (3,937 ft)
- Delfim Moreira, Minas Gerais – 1,200 m (3,937 ft)
- Bueno Brandão, Minas Gerais – 1,200 m (3,937 ft)
- Barbacena, Minas Gerais – 1,160 m (3,806 ft)

Due to altitude, winter in the Serra da Mantiqueira sees low temperatures, with the occurrence of fog in early morning and frost, giving the landscape the appearance of regions with a much colder climate. In winter, it is common for the temperatures to reach near 0 °C (32 °F), and then sub-freezing temperatures not rarely occur in the region's towns. On top of the highest peaks, the cold can be even more intense, and temperatures can drop to -10 °C (14 °F). Snow is rare, but it has been recorded a few times, such as in the winter of 1994, when it snowed in the Itatiaia massif.

== Micro-regions ==
- Cidades Altas: region lying on the right bank of the Jaguari River and including the cities of Itapeva, Camanducaia, Munhoz, Senador Amaral, Bom Repouso, Bueno Brandão and Ouro Fino, in the state of Minas Gerais, and Pedra Bela and Serra Negra in the state of São Paulo.
- Entre Rios: between two rivers, the Jaguari, which flows in a north-south direction and is part of the Tietê River basin, and the Sapucaí-Mirim River, which flows from south to north and forms the Grande River. It includes the cities of Extrema, Monte Verde, Gonçalves and Sapucaí-Mirim in Minas Gerais.
- Pinhais: contains two relatively large cities, Campos do Jordão and São Bento do Sapucaí, as well as Santo Antônio do Pinhal, in the state of São Paulo, and Brasópolis, Piranguçu, Monte Verde district of Camanducaia and Wenceslau Braz, in the state of Minas Gerais.
- Terras Altas: containing some of the area's oldest cities, such as Passa Quatro, Itanhandu, Itamonte, Pouso Alto, Alagoa, Virgínia, Delfim Moreira and Marmelópolis, all in Minas Gerais.
- Itatiaia: with the Itatiaia National Park, the nearby cities of Bocaina de Minas, Liberdade, and Mirantão in Minas Gerais, Resende and Itatiaia in Rio de Janeiro, and the village of Visconde de Mauá, which lies partly in each state.
- Ibitipoca: this region is entirely in Minas Gerais, after a sharp northeast turn takes the range away from the state's southern borders; it includes the cities of Bom Jardim de Minas, Lima Duarte, Santa Rita de Ibitipoca and Barbacena, the latter being the largest city in the Mantiqueira range.

== Miscellaneous information ==
- Brazilian composer Antonio Carlos Jobim composed a song called "Mantiqueira Range" for his album Jobim (1972). Jobim got his inspiration for the piece from the mountain range of the same name.

== See also ==
- Três Pontas Mountains
