= Serra da Mantiqueira Environmental Protection Area =

Protected area in Brazil

- Área de Proteção Ambiental Serra da Mantiqueira
- IUCN category V (protected landscape/seascape)
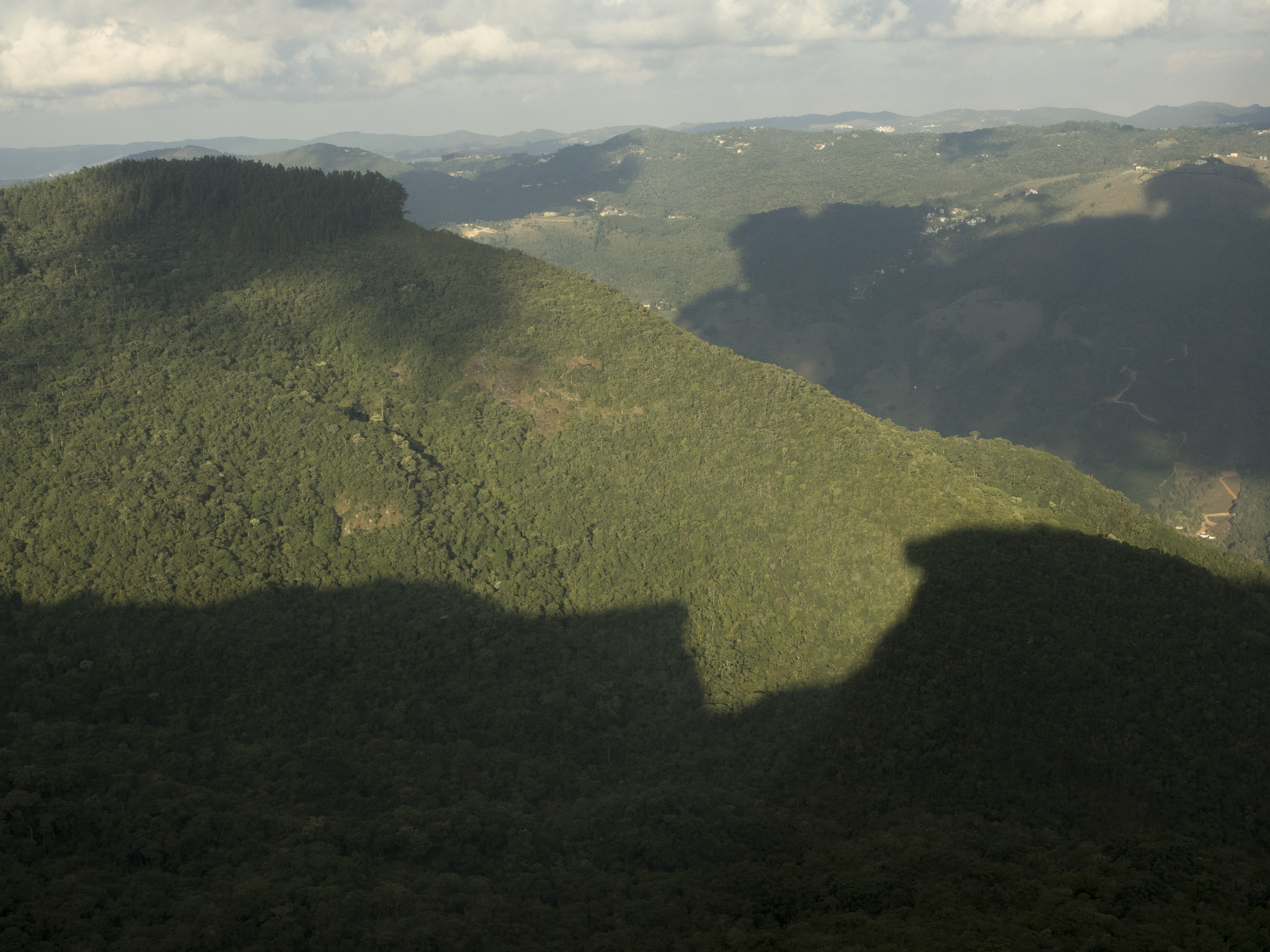
- Mountain near Campos do Jordão, São Paulo. The shadow of Pedra do Baú, a well-known local landmark, can be seen at the bottom.

- Location within Brazil
- Nearest city: Brazil
- Coordinates: 22°20′13″S 44°33′43″W
- Area: 421,804 hectares (1,042,300 acres)
- Designation: Environmental Protection Area
- Created: 3 June 1985

Serra da Mantiqueira Environmental Protection Area (Portuguese: Área de Proteção Ambiental da Serra da Mantiqueira) is a protected area of Brazil that includes parts of the states of Minas Gerais, Rio de Janeiro and São Paulo.

== Location ==
The environment protection area in the Atlantic Forest biome, with an area of 421,804 hectares (1,042,300 acres), was created on 3 June 1985. It is administered by the Chico Mendes Institute for Biodiversity Conservation. It is part of the Mantiqueira Mosaic of conservation units.

The area includes parts of the states of Minas Gerais, Rio de Janeiro and São Paulo. In Minas Gerais it includes the municipalities of Aiuruoca, Alagoa, Bocaina de Minas, Baependi, Delfim Moreira, Itamonte, Itanhandu, Liberdade, Marmelópolis, Passa Quatro, Passa-Vinte, Piranguçu, Pouso Alto, Virgínia and Wenceslau Braz. In Rio de Janeiro it includes the municipalities of Itatiaia and Resende. In São Paulo it includes the municipalities of Campos do Jordão, Cruzeiro, Guaratinguetá, Lorena, Lavrinhas, Pindamonhangaba, Piquete, Queluz, Santo Antônio do Pinhal, São Bento do Sapucaí.

== Environment ==
The terrain consists of rugged mountain ranges, with peaks over 2,000 metres (6,600 ft). It includes the peaks of Pedra da Mina [2,798 metres (9,180 ft)], Pico dos Três Estados [2,665 metres (8,743 ft)] and Pico dos Marins [2,420 metres (7,940 ft)]. Average annual rainfall is 1,750 millimetres (69 in). Mean temperatures range from 0 to 25 °C (32 to 77 °F), with an average of 18 °C (64 °F).

Vegetation is mostly from the Atlantic Forest ecosystem. Below 1,100 metres (3,600 ft) it is mostly dense montane rainforest. From 1,100 to 2,000 metres (3,600 to 6,600 ft) there is mixed dense rainforest and upper montane forest, with specimens of Araucaria angustifolia (Brazilian pine). Above 1,800 metres (5,900 ft) there are areas of open fields or rocky fields. Endemic fauna include the Maldonada redbelly toad (Melanophryniscus moreirae). Migratory species include the great egret (Ardea alba), snowy egret (Egretta thula) and striated heron (Butorides striata).

== Conservation ==
The protection area is classed as IUCN protected area category V (protected landscape/seascape. The purpose is to ensure conservation of the landscape and regional culture of the Mantiqueira Mountains, to protect and preserve endemic and Andean flora and remnants of the Araucaria forests, to preserve continuity of vegetation coverage along the central mountain spine, and to preserve the original vegetation and wildlife, particularly endangered species. Protected species include the ocelot (Leopardus pardalis mitis) and black-capped piprites (Piprites pileata).

== Sources ==
- APA da Serra da Mantiqueira (in Portuguese), Chico Mendes Institute for Biodiversity Conservation
- o mosaico mantiqueira (in Portuguese), Mosaico Mantiqueira, archived from the original on 2016-09-27
- Unidade de Conservação: Área de Proteção Ambiental Serra da Mantiqueira (in Portuguese), MMA: Ministério do Meio Ambiente
