= Boana latistriata =

Conservation status
- Data Deficient (IUCN 3.1)

Scientific classification
- Kingdom: Animalia
- Phylum: Chordata
- Class: Amphibia
- Order: Anura
- Family: Hylidae
- Genus: Boana
- Species: B. latistriata

Binomial name
- Boana latistriata (Caramaschi and Cruz, 2004)

Synonyms
- Hyla latistriata Caramaschi and Cruz, 2004; Hypsiboas latistriatus (Caramaschi and Cruz, 2004)

Species of frog

Boana latistriata is a species of frog in the family Hylidae. It is endemic to Brazil and only known from its type locality, Itatiaia National Park, and from Marmelópolis, both in the state of Minas Gerais. The specific name latistriata refers to the wide stripes on the back of this frog.

== Description ==
Adult males measure 35–41 mm (1.4–1.6 in) and adult females 41–52 mm (1.6–2.0 in) in snout–vent length. The tympanum is distinct. Finger and toe tips bear adhesive discs; fingers have traces of webbing while the toes are moderately webbed. The dorsum has a characteristic pattern consisting of four wide, light brown longitudinal stripes interspersed by three narrow brown stripes. The flanks have a dark brown lateral stripe delimited by a white line above and by a narrow white stripe below. Males have a subgular vocal sac.

Tadpoles of Gosner stage 25 measure about 42 mm (1.7 in) in total length, including the 14 mm (0.6 in) body. The tadpoles reach a total length of 64 mm (2.5 in) at Gosner stage 39, including the 21 mm (0.8 in) body. The tail fin is higher than the body.

== Taxonomy ==
There is some disagreement on whether Boana latistriata is a full species; one recent study has suggested it is a synonym of Boana polytaenia, while another indicates that B. latistriata is a full species, and most closely related to Boana beckeri. Between taxonomic authorities, the IUCN accepts B. latistriata's synonymy with B. polytaenia, while Amphibian Species of the World currently maintains B. latistriata as a full species.

== Reproduction ==
Males call from dusk to late at night (at least to 2 am), perched on shrubs and grass, near or above the water. They have two types of advertisement calls: a short, single-note call with a lower pulse period, and a long call with higher pulse period. Calling males may engage in fights.

== Habitat and conservation ==
Boana latistriata occurs in montane Atlantic forest and highland grasslands at elevations of 1,200–2,450 m (3,940–8,040 ft) above sea level. The tadpoles develop in rivulets and are benthic, probably feeding on organic matter.

This species is threatened by deforestation and fragmentation of the Atlantic forest habitat. It is present in the Itatiaia National Park.
