= Senador Amaral =

- Municipality and town
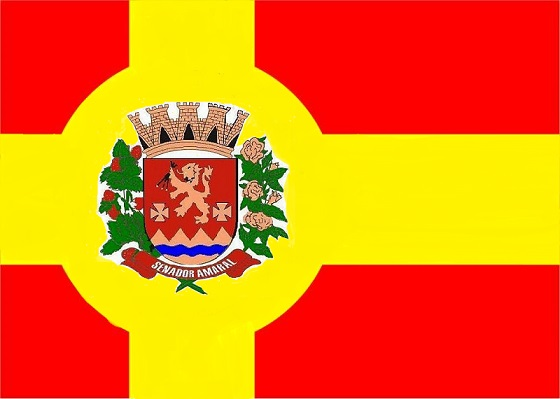
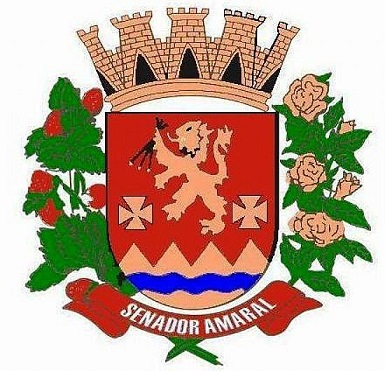
- Flag Coat of arms

- Location in Brazil
- Coordinates: 22°35′S 46°11′W
- Country: Brazil
- Region: Southeast
- State: Minas Gerais
- Mesoregion: Sul/Sudoeste de Minas

Population (2020)
  - Total: 5,361
- Time zone: UTC−3 (BRT)

Senador Amaral is the second highest city in Brazil (1,505 m [4,938 ft]), reaching near 1,620 m (5,310 ft) in some parts in the northern areas, nearly the Ponte Segura district, the highest point is an unnamed mount in Bom Repouso border at approximately 1,660 m (5,450 ft) above sea level. It is located in the Mantiqueira Mountains, south of Minas Gerais state. It is a small city, with a population of 5,361 inhabitants and approximately 2980 people living in the urban area. There was no asphalt or mobile phone signal in the municipality before 2007. Only Cambuí access, MG-295 is asphalted.

== Geography ==
=== Climate ===
Senador Amaral has status of Estância Climática because of its cold climate, has an average annual temperature of 18.2 °C (64.8 °F), and in winter's nights temperatures of around 0 to 6 °C (32 to 43 °F) and with a record low of −5 °C (23 °F).

=== Distances ===
Some distances from surrounding and major cities:

- 18.2 km (11.3 mi) from Cambuí (and the federal highway BR-381)
- 38.4 km (23.9 mi) from Camanducaia
- 63.8 km (39.6 mi) from Extrema
- 95.2 km (59.2 mi) from Bragança Paulista
- 25 km (16 mi) from Munhoz
- 19 km (12 mi) from Bom Repouso
- 67.6 km (42.0 mi) from Pouso Alegre
- 105 km (65 mi) from Campos do Jordão
- 168 km (104 mi) from Campinas
- 170 km (110 mi) from Poços de Caldas
- 167 km (104 mi) from Três Corações
- 249 km (155 mi) from Resende
- 409 km (254 mi) from Rio de Janeiro
- 458 km (285 mi) from Belo Horizonte
- 171 km (106 mi) from São Paulo.

== See also ==
- Campos do Jordão
- Cambuí
- Mantiqueira Mountains
- List of municipalities in Minas Gerais
