= Pedra de São Domingos =

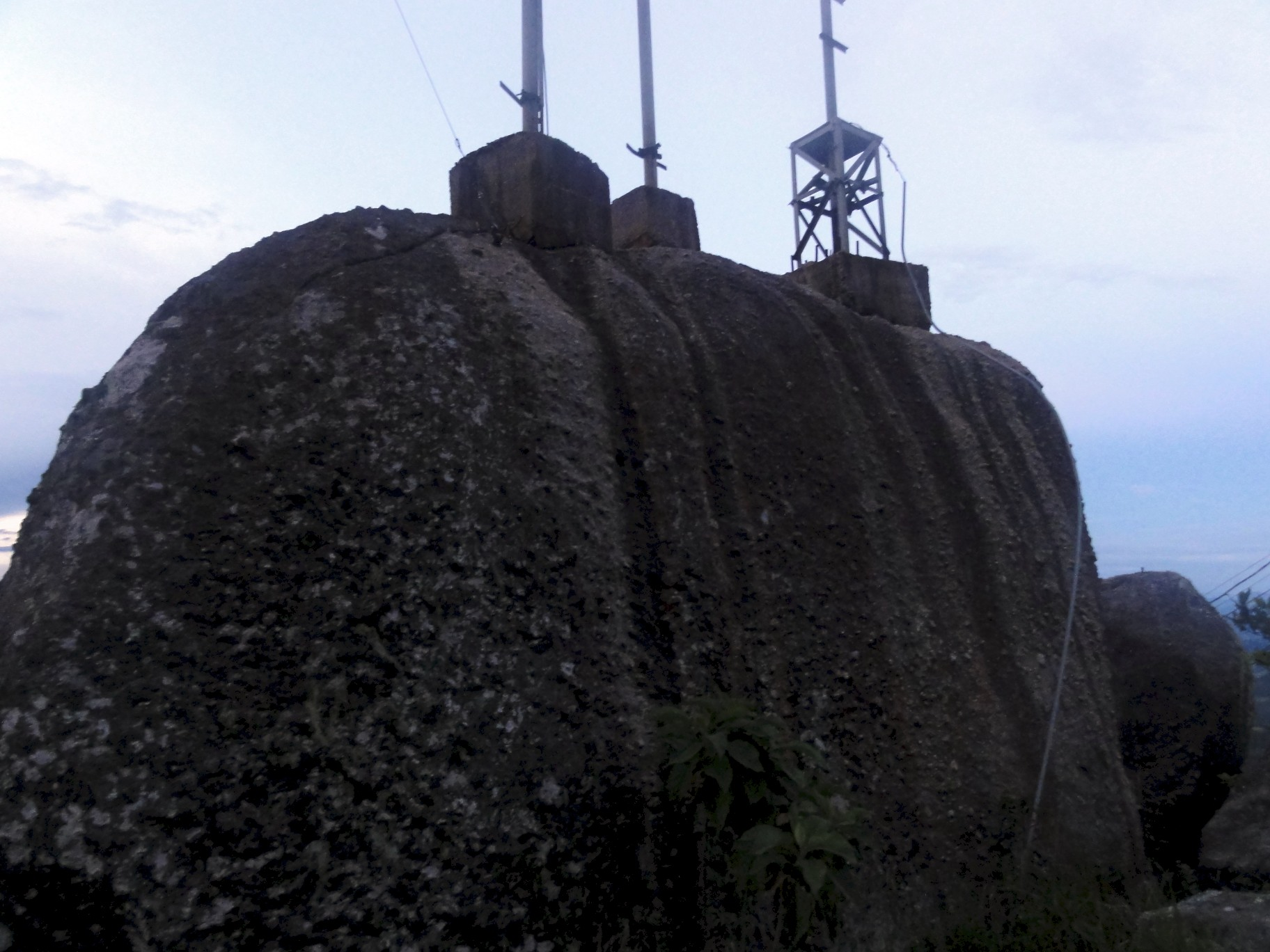

Highest point
- Elevation: 2,050 m (6,730 ft)
- Coordinates: 22°41′29″S 45°57′34″W

Geography
- Location within Brazil
- Location: Córrego do Bom Jesus and Gonçalves, Minas Gerais, Brazil
- Parent range: Mantiqueira Mountains

Pedra de São Domingos is a rock formation located between the municipalities of Paraisópolis, Córrego do Bom Jesus and Gonçalves, Minas Gerais, Brazil. The gneiss landform is one of the highest points in the Mantiqueira Mountains. At its highest point, the elevation is 2,050 metres (6,730 ft).

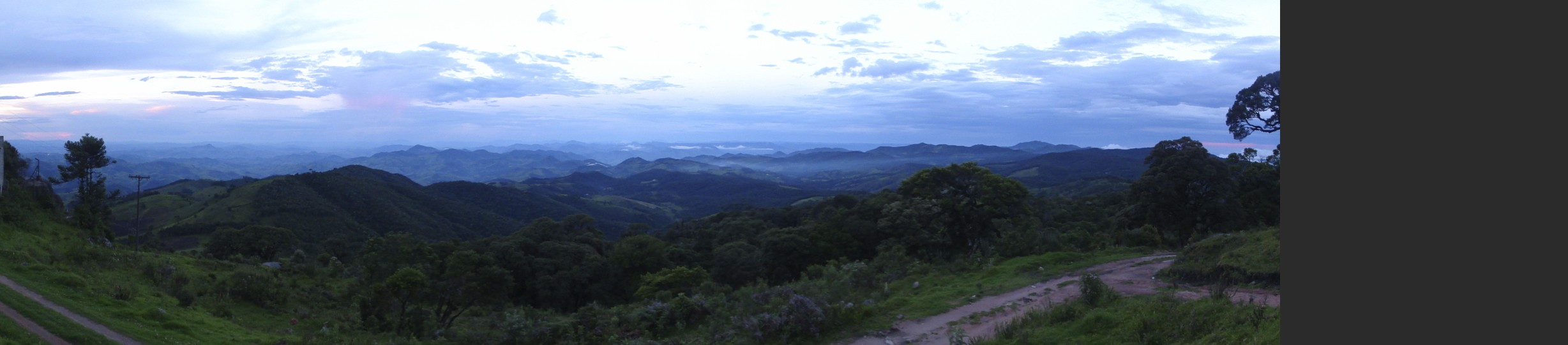
View from Pedra de São Domingos and surroundings panorama
