= Delfim Moreira (disambiguation) =

Delfim Moreira (1868–1920), Brazilian politician who served as the tenth president of Brazil

Delfim Moreira may also refer to:

- Delfim Moreira, Minas Gerais, a municipality in the state of Minas Gerais named after the president of Brazil
- Delfim Moreira (runner), (born 1955), Portuguese long-distance runner
