= Henriques waterfall =

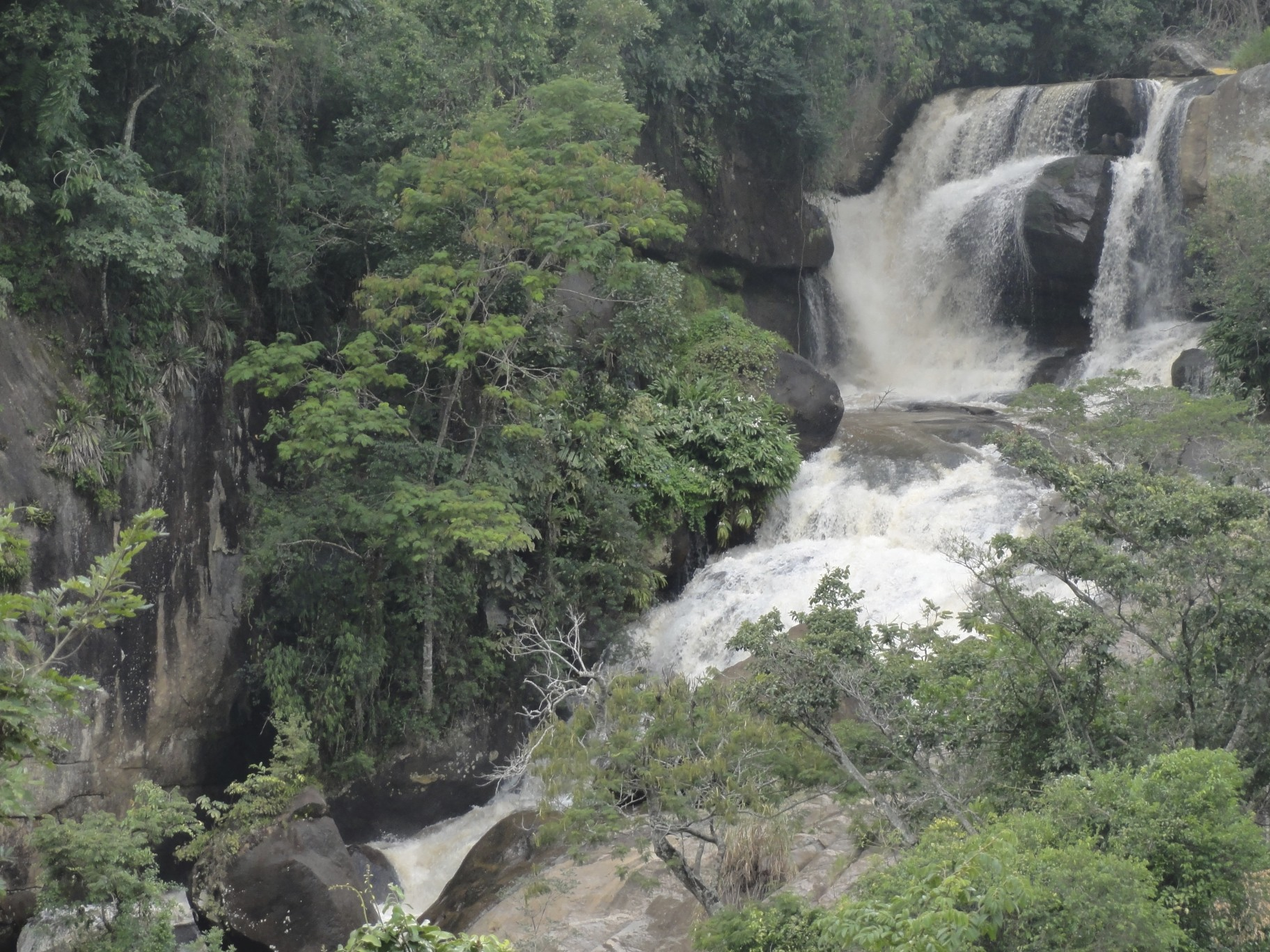
- Henriques waterfall

- Location within Brazil
- Location: Gonçalves, Minas Gerais, Brazil
- Coordinates: 22°36′43″S 45°53′07″W
- Type: cascade
- Number of drops: numerous
- Longest drop: 100 metres (330 ft)

Henriques waterfall (Portuguese: Cachoeira dos Henriques) is a waterfall located in the Henriques bairro of the municipality of Gonçalves, Minas Gerais, Brazil.
