= Pico dos Marins =

Mountain in Brazil

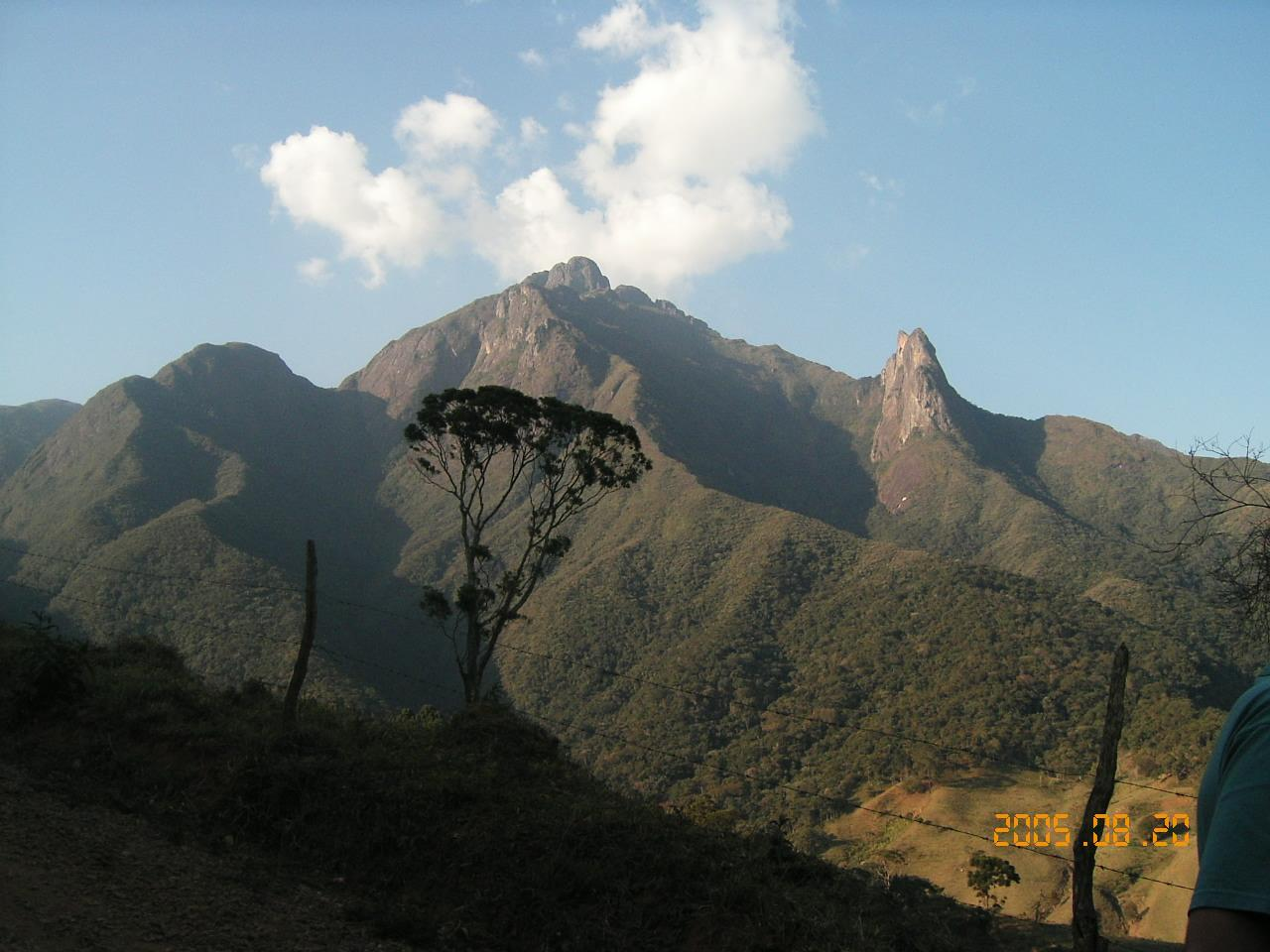

Highest point
- Elevation: 2,420.7 m (7,942 ft)
- Coordinates: 22°30′09″S 45°07′16″W

Geography
- Location within Brazil
- Parent range: Mantiqueira Mountains

Climbing
- First ascent: 1911

Pico dos Marins is a mountain peak in Brazil, between the cities of Piquete and Cruzeiro, state of São Paulo. The peak stands only about 1 kilometre (0.62 mi) south of the Minas Gerais state border, but it is located entirely in São Paulo territory. It is part of a short spur of the southwestern section of the Mantiqueira Mountains, and it has an elevation of 2,420.7 metres (7,942 ft).

== False state highest point ==
For many years, Pico dos Marins was incorrectly considered to be the highest point in the state of São Paulo. This information could be found in many official publications and schoolbooks. Later it was found that several peaks of the more easterly Serra Fina sub-range of the Mantiqueira Mountains were much higher. Serra Fina's highest summit, Pedra da Mina, on the Minas Gerais border, is now acknowledged to be the state's true highest point, at 2,798 metres (9,180 ft). Pico dos Três Estados ("Three-State Peak"), at the border tripoint of São Paulo, Minas Gerais and Rio de Janeiro states, is also much higher at 2,665 metres (8,743 ft).

Pico dos Marins is still often erroneously mentioned as being the highest mountain entirely within the state of São Paulo (i.e., not shared with Minas Gerais or Rio de Janeiro), but at least two Serra Fina mountains are both higher and located wholly within São Paulo: Pico da Cabeça de Touro, (Note: The Brazilian Institute of Geography and Statistics (IBGE)'s 2014 Statistical Yearbook actually lists Pico da Cabeça de Touro as being in the state of Rio de Janeiro, but the latitude and longitude coordinates supplied in the same publication (22°25'07" S, 44°48'04" W) place the peak within São Paulo territory, as do several mountaineer reports, which place it in a location consistent with those coordinates.) southwest of Pico dos Três Estados and the probable true holder of the title, at exactly 2,600 metres (8,500 ft), and Morro do Tartarugão, just southwest of Pedra da Mina, at 2,595 metres (8,514 ft). The Serra Fina range is still poorly surveyed, and other higher peaks may yet be found.

Still, Pico dos Marins is the highest point of its section of the range and an important landmark, as its detachment from the main Mantiqueira ridge crest allows it to be easily seen and recognized from a vast extension of the densely populated and highly industrialized Paraíba do Sul river valley to its south.

== Ascent ==
The mountain was first climbed in 1911.

== Topography ==
The main assembly of the Marins Massif consists of three sharp rocky peaks, all over 2,000 meters above sea level and consisting of hundreds of meters of rocky cliffs. In spite of being the highest of the three, Pico dos Marins is the most accessible to climbers, thanks to its less vertical north face. Deep valleys cut by canyons and tight vegetation cause its neighbors to be much more difficult to climb. North to south, the peaks are named Marins, Maria and Mariana.
