= Itatiaia National Park =

National park in Brazil

- Parque Nacional do Itatiaia
- IUCN category II (national park)
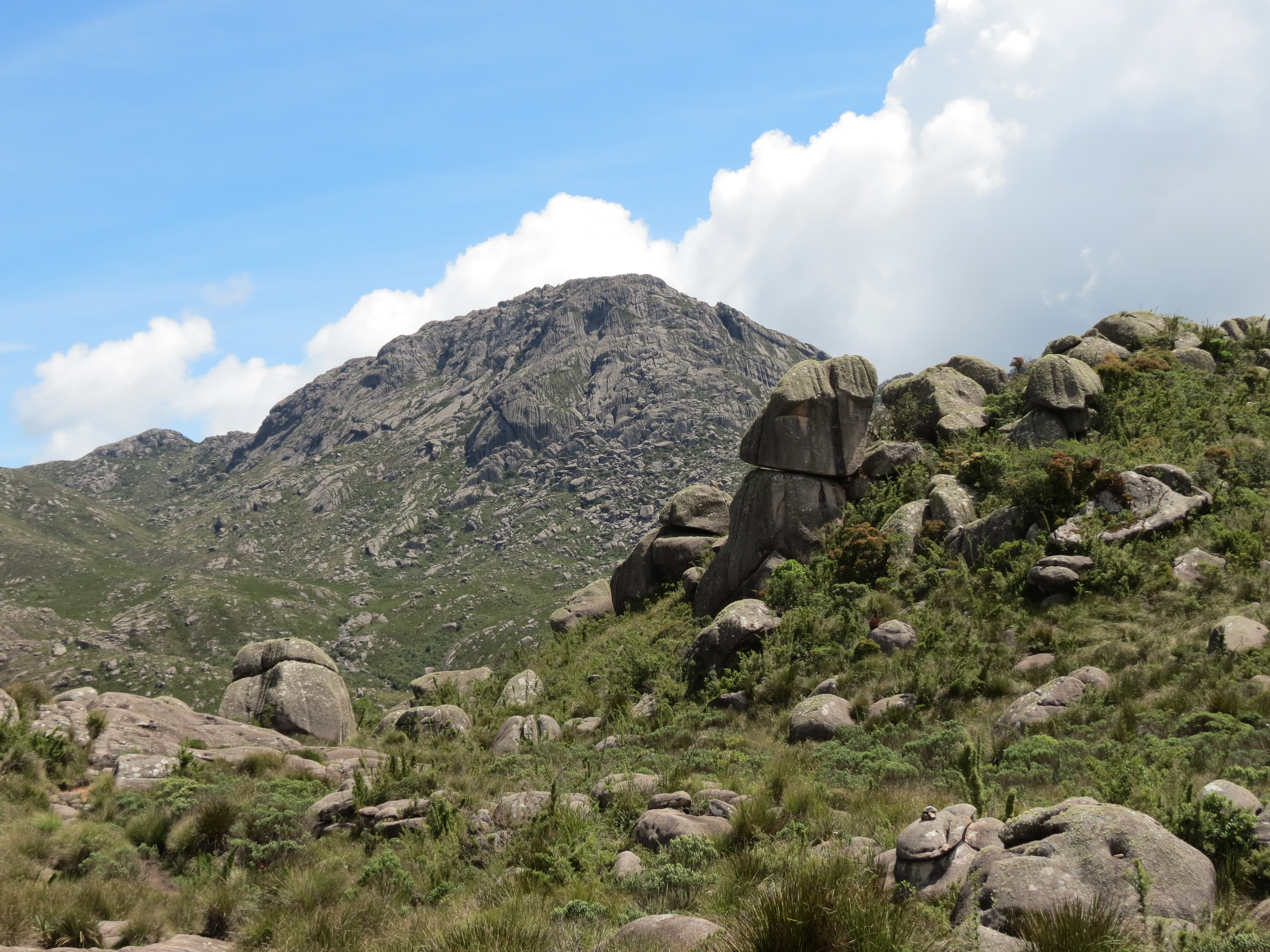
- View in January 2014

- Location within Brazil
- Nearest city: Resende, Rio de Janeiro
- Coordinates: 22.375°S 44.612°W
- Designation: National park
- Created: 14 June 1937
- Administrator: ICMBio

Itatiaia National Park (Portuguese: Parque Nacional do Itatiaia) was established in 1937 as the first national park in Brazil, and after more than 85 years, the oldest. It is located on the border between the states of Rio de Janeiro and Minas Gerais.

== Etymology ==
Itatiaia means "many-pointed rock" in the Tupi language.

== Location ==
Itatiaia National Park was created on 14 June 1937 by President Getúlio Vargas, the first of 76 such parks. The park is in the Mantiqueira Mountains. It covers parts of the municipalities of Itatiaia and Resende in Rio de Janeiro state, and Bocaina de Minas and Itamonte in Minas Gerais state. It is mountainous and rocky with altitudes ranging from 540 to 2,791 metres (1,772 to 9,157 ft). The highest point is the Black Needles Peak (Pico das Agulhas Negras).

The higher part of the park contains the origins of 12 river basins that supply Brazil's Rio Grande, a tributary of the Paraná River, and the Paraíba do Sul, the most important river in Rio de Janeiro state. The lower part of the park has lush Atlantic Forest vegetation and wide rivers with natural pools and waterfalls.

Pico das Agulhas Negras is the state' third highest mountain at 2,878 metres (9,442 ft). The park attracts bird watchers from all over the world with its 350 species of birds. Other attractions include hiking and rock climbing. The park is surrounded by the Serra da Mantiqueira Environmental Protection Area which provides an ecological buffer zone for the park.

The high area of the park is accessible through an entrance about 35 km from the main entrance and gives access to the Pico das Agulhas Negras and Prateleiras complex. The low area of the park is much closer to the city of Itatiaia and has many waterfalls, such as Véu da Noiva with 45 meters. The low area has also a natural history museum.

== Gallery ==
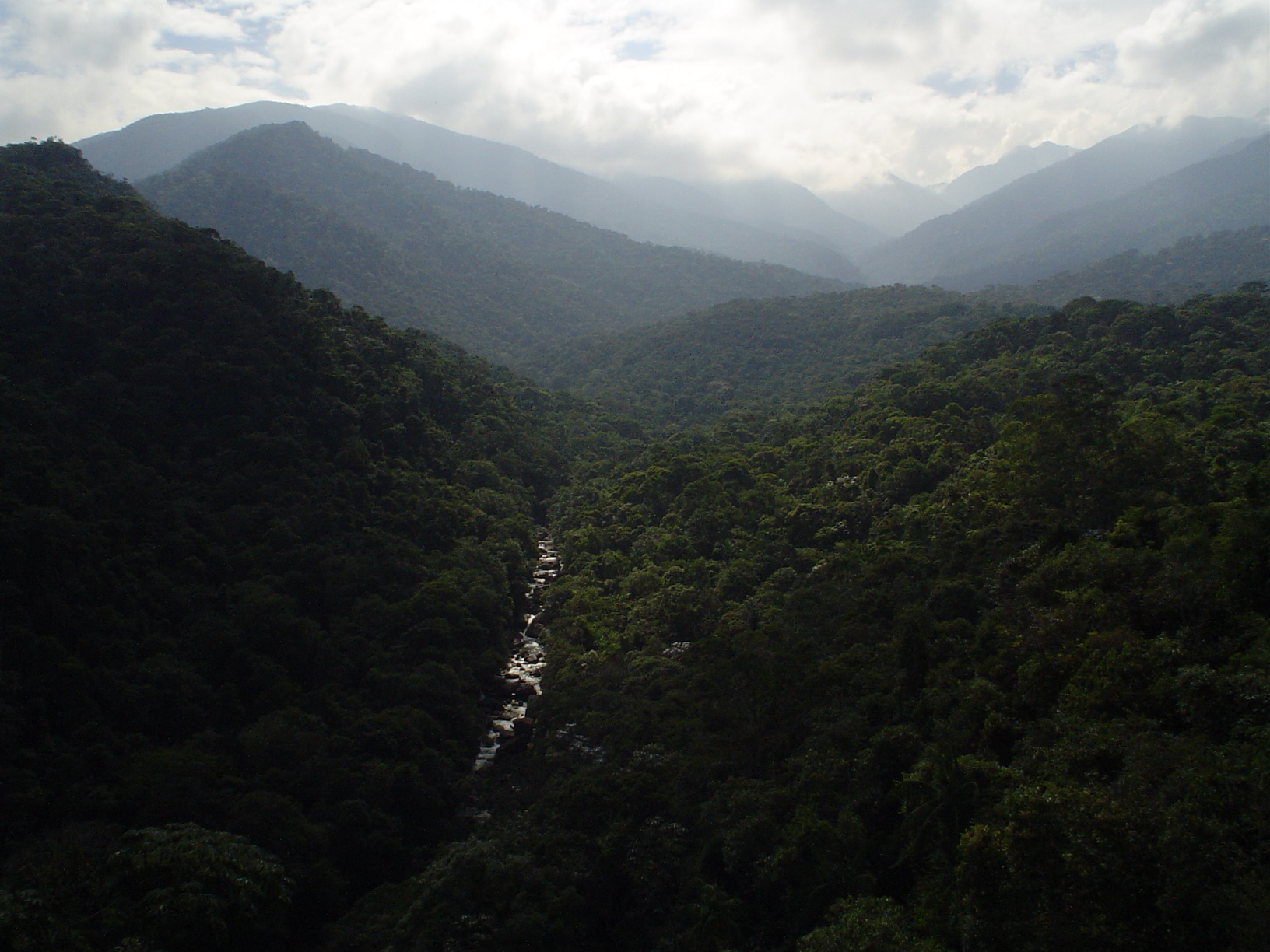
Itatiaia National Park Overview

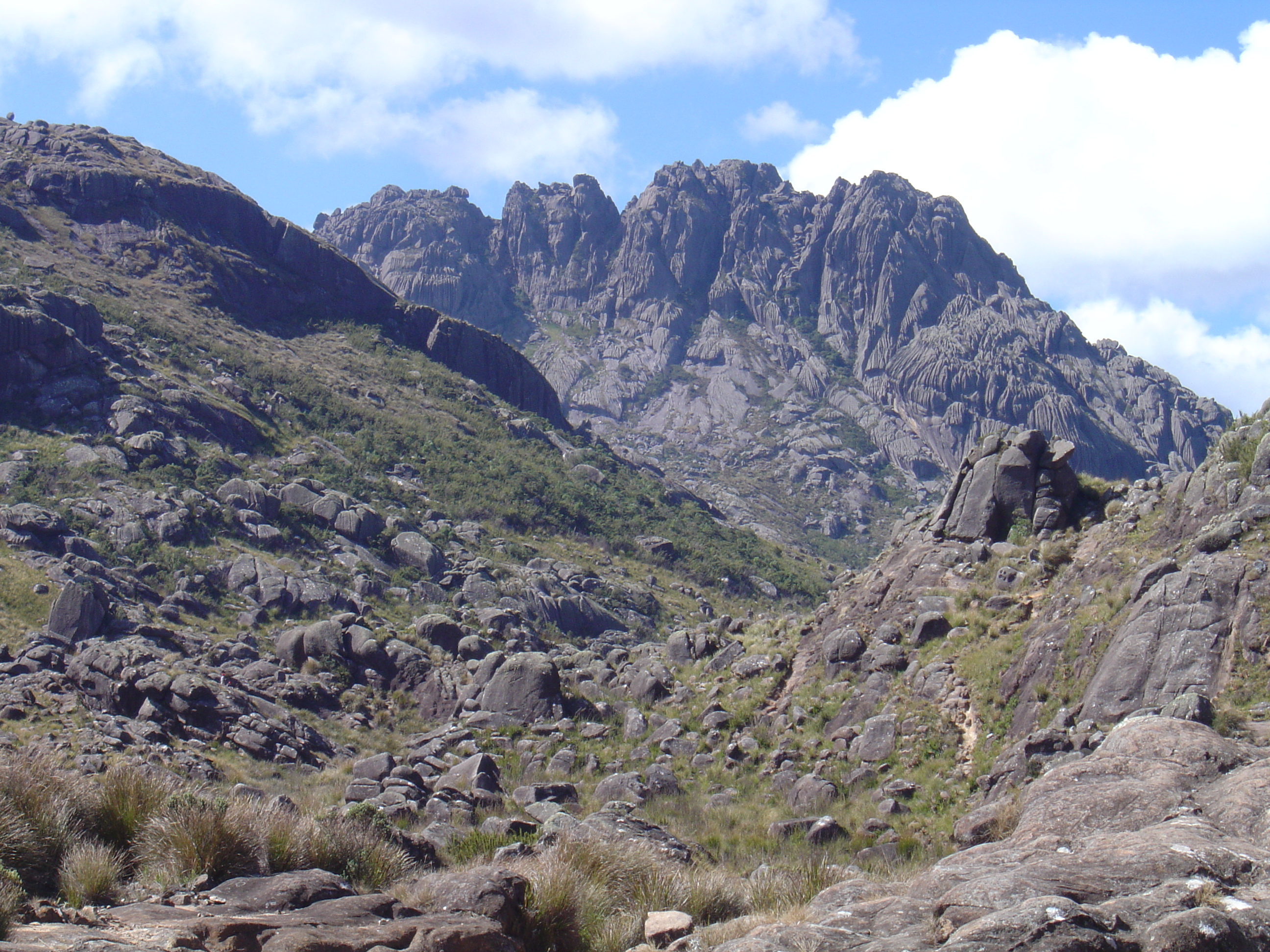
Pico das Agulhas Negras, the highest peak in the National Park

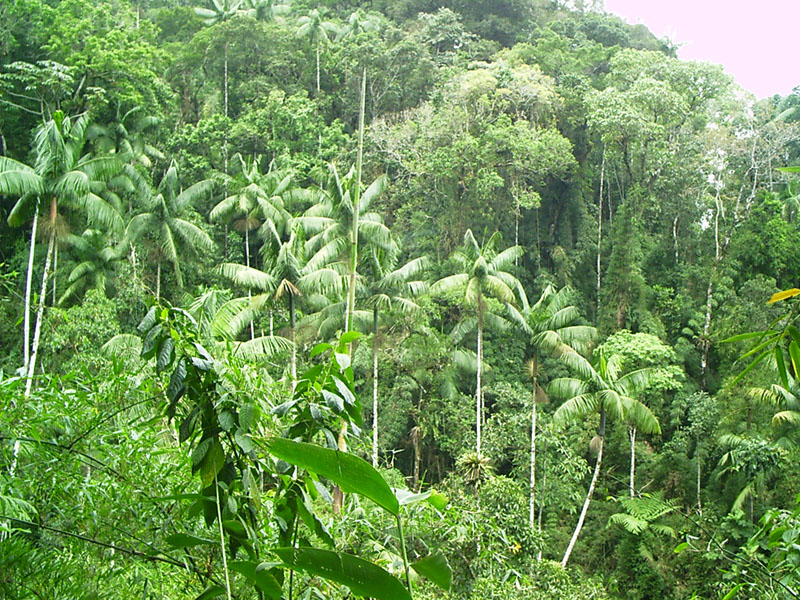
Itatiaia National Park

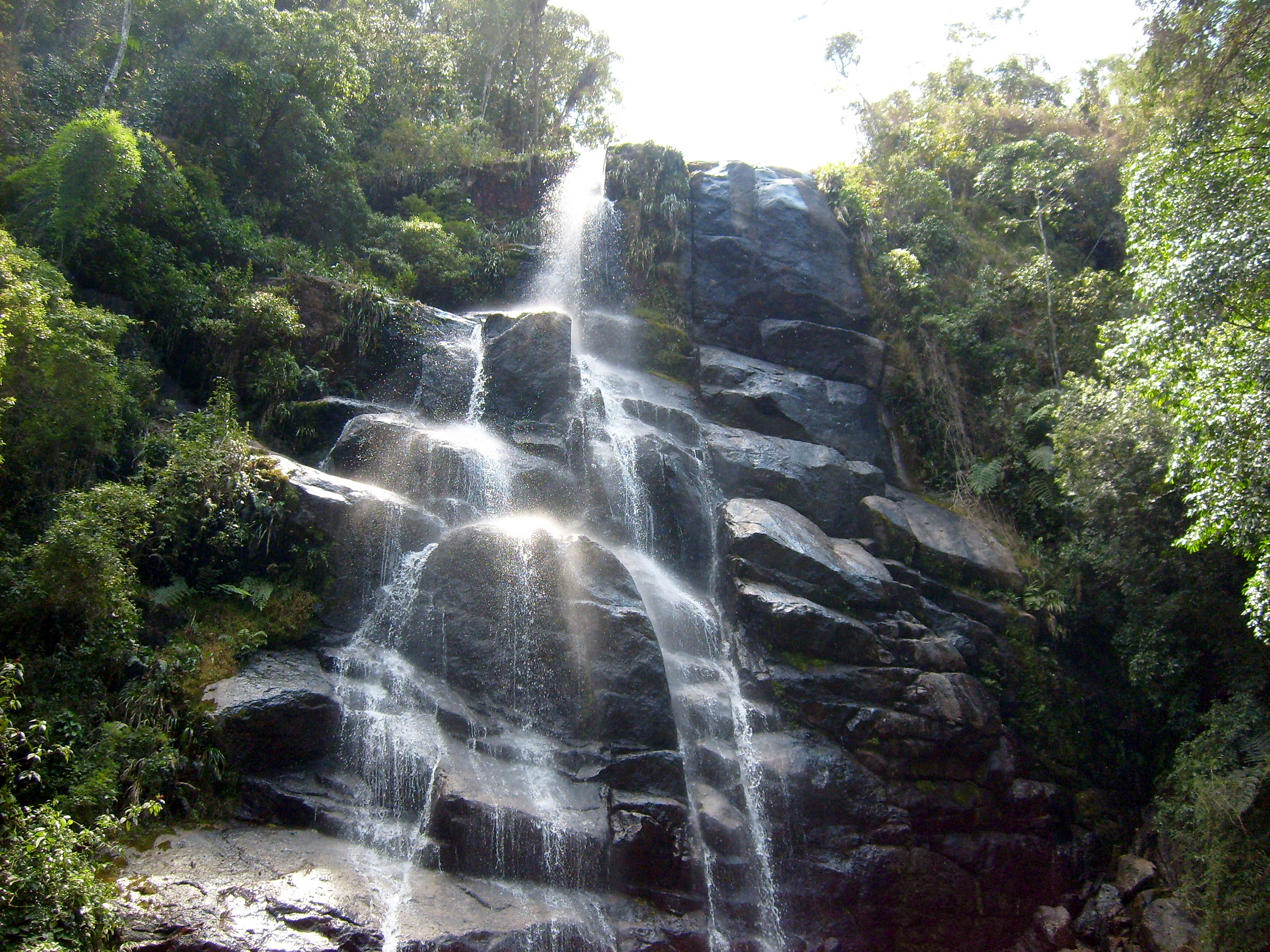
Véu de Noiva waterfall

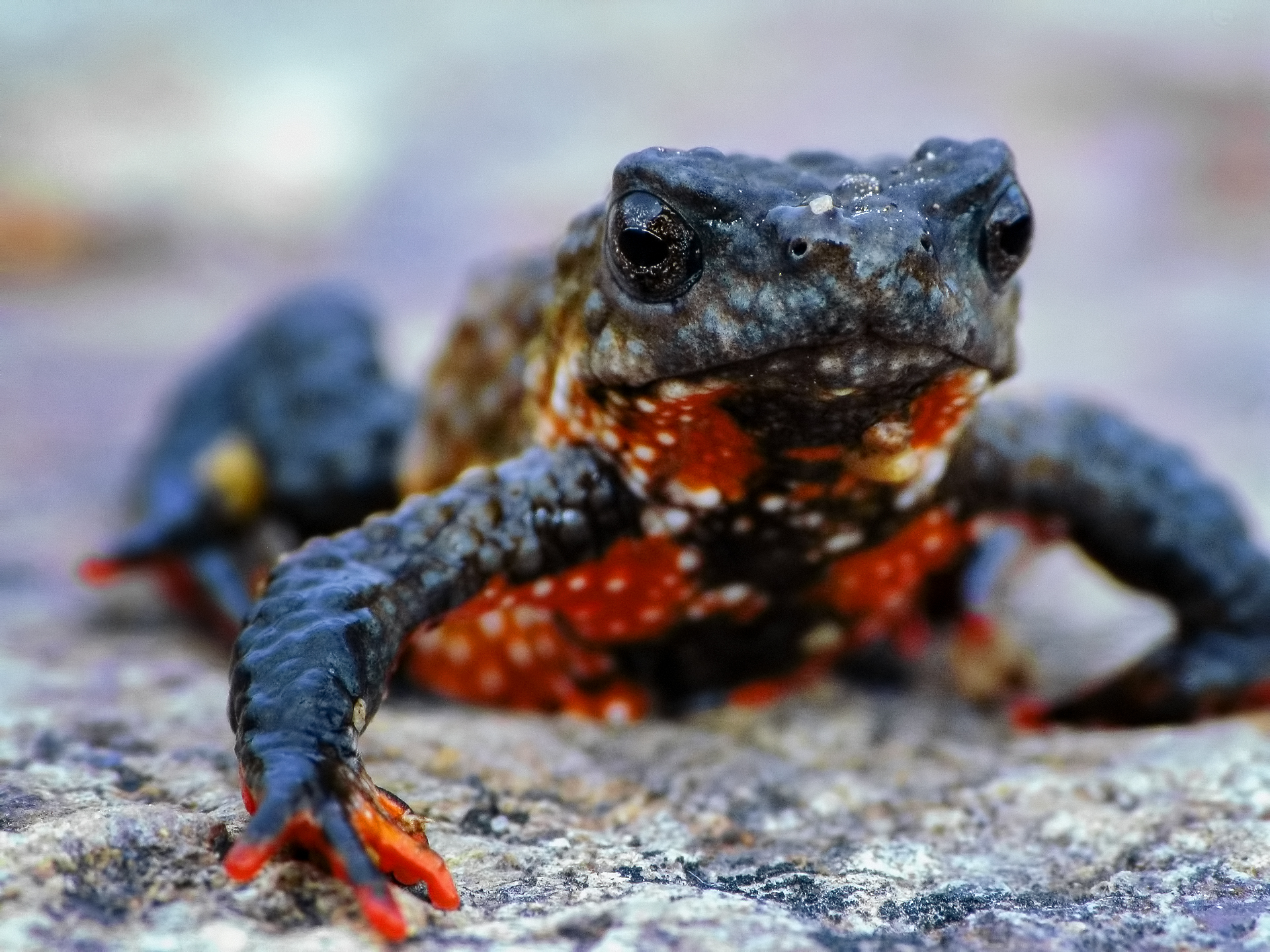
Melanophryniscus frog, symbol species of the park

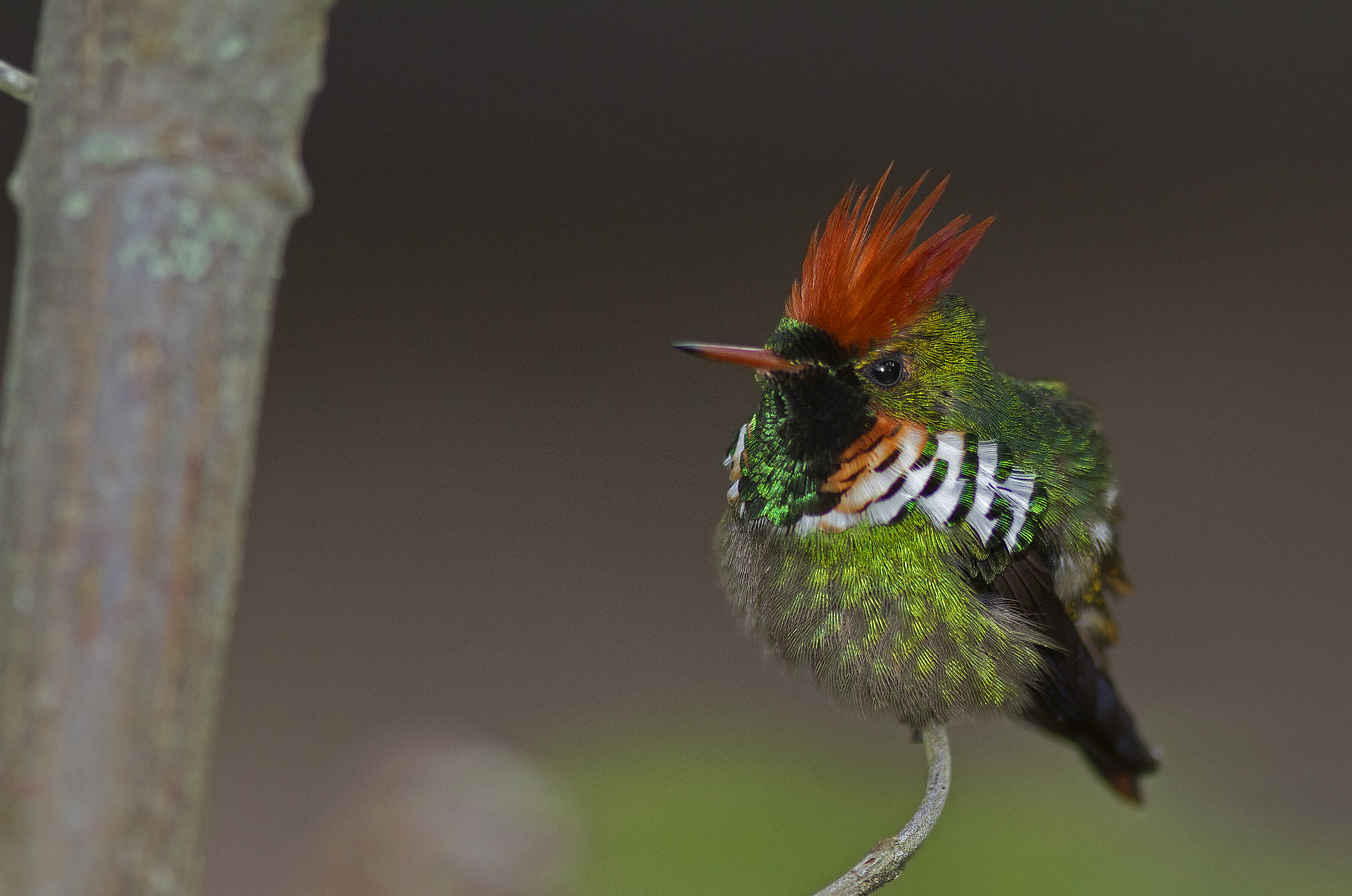
Frilled coquette

== Sources ==
- The Itatiaia National Park, ICMBio, archived from the original on 2017-03-13
