= Pedra da Mina =

Mountain in Brazil

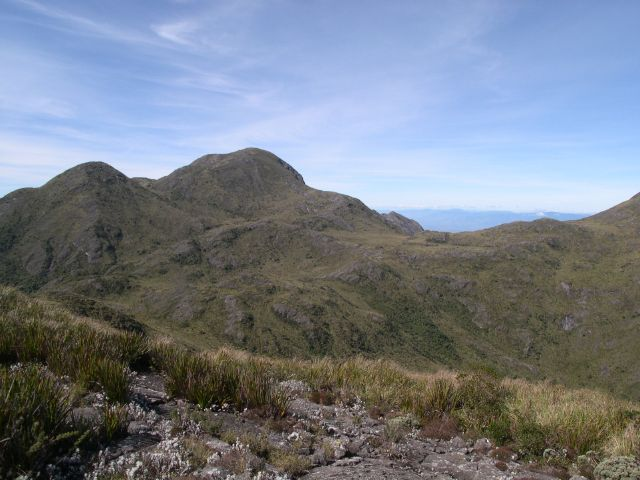

Highest point
- Elevation: 2,798 m (9,180 ft)
- Prominence: 2,068 m (6,785 ft)
- Listing: Ultra
- Coordinates: 22°25′S 44°51′W

Geography
- Location within Brazil
- Location: Between the towns of Queluz and Lavrinhas (São Paulo), and Passa Quatro (Minas Gerais), Brazil
- Parent range: Serra Fina, a section of the Mantiqueira Mountains

Climbing
- First ascent: 8 July 1955 by; Geraldo Américo; Henning Bobrik; José Dias; Gunther Engels; Felix Bernhard Hacker; Theodor Reimar Hacker; Sebastião Pedro; José Vidal
- Easiest route: From the town of Passa Quatro, by a trail that starts at the rural hamlet of Paiolinho

Pedra da Mina (Portuguese pronunciation: [ˈpɛdɾɐ dɐ ˈmĩnɐ]) is the fourth highest mountain in Brazil, (Note: The three officially higher Brazilian mountains are Pico da Neblina (2,995 m/9,826 ft), Pico 31 de Março (2,974 m/9,757 ft), and Pico da Bandeira (2,891 m/9,485 ft). However, Pedra da Mina becomes the seventh highest Brazilian mountain (and the fifth highest in Minas Gerais) if three summits of the Caparaó Mountains are counted: Pico do Calçado-Mirim, Pico do Calçado, and Pico do Cruzeiro, ranging from 2,818 to 2,852 m (9,245 to 9,357 ft). A 2004 official expedition measured their elevation by GPS, but due to proximity and topographic prominence issues, the Brazilian Institute of Geography and Statistics considers them to be just secondary summits of Pico da Bandeira and does not list them in its ranking of the highest Brazilian mountains. The summit rock of Mount Roraima is also higher at 2,810 m (9,220 ft), but the summit is in Venezuela, and Mount Roraima's highest point in Brazilian territory is lower at 2,734 m (8,970 ft).) located in the Serra Fina section of the Mantiqueira Mountains, one of the country's most important mountain ranges. The mountain stands on the border of the states of Minas Gerais and São Paulo, respectively to its north and south. With a 2,798-metre (9,180-foot) elevation, it is the highest point of the Mantiqueira Mountains and of the state of São Paulo, and the second highest mountain in the state of Minas Gerais.

In addition to being one of the highest Brazilian mountains, Pedra da Mina is also remarkable for its peculiar history (see below), as in spite of its high elevation and of being located relatively close to densely populated areas, until the turn of the 21st century the mountain was virtually unknown, so was its exact elevation, and its importance was not acknowledged until very recently, showing that even in the 21st century, geographical exploration may still hold surprises. In this case, official statistics and schoolbooks had to be corrected, and a new popular mountaineering and ecotourism destination appeared.

Like all of Serra Fina, Pedra da Mina is composed of highly alkaline nepheline syenite, a type of rock that is easily eroded and for this reason is not usually found at very high elevations. Pedra da Mina is believed to be the highest mountain made of that type of rock in the Americas and possibly in the world.

Pedra means "rock" in Portuguese; mina usually means "mine", but it can also mean "spring, water source". So, the name of the mountain means "Water Spring Rock", and it is due to the fact that four small creeks rise from the mountain close to the top.

Pedra da Mina is not located in any national or state park, but it is within the Mantiqueira Mountains Environmental Protection Area, and therefore still legally protected to some extent.

== History ==
=== First documented ascent and subsequent years (1955-1999) ===
The first documented climb of Pedra da Mina happened in 1955, by a party of eight, on the initiative of four German immigrants (Henning Bobrik, Gunther Engels, Felix Bernhard Hacker and Theodor Reimar Hacker). They had been Alpine mountaineers in their homeland, maintained the hobby when they came to Brazil, and decided to explore the then relatively unknown Serra Fina range, which they had seen from a distance when exploring the nearby Itatiaia Massif. They were aided by farmer José Dias from the nearby town of Passa Quatro, and three of his employees (José Vidal, Geraldo Américo and Sebastião Pedro). They chose to approach the range from the much less steep north side, and after a very difficult four-day trek in very cold, wet and misty conditions, the eight men reached the top of Pedra da Mina, which they correctly identified as Serra Fina's highest summit, on 8 July 1955. Using a barometer, they measured an elevation of 2,718 metres (8,917 ft). The descent took three further days.

Later, the relative isolation of the Serra Fina range, which is uninhabited, traversed by no mountain passes or roads, and surrounded by dense vegetation, made the area little known, poorly mapped, and rarely explored until the end of the 20th century, other than occasional expeditions by members of the small São Paulo Alpine Club, starting from the 1970s. Old maps of the area showed highly discrepant elevation values for Pedra da Mina, from as low as 2,437 metres (7,995 ft) in some aeronautical charts to 2,770 metres (9,090 ft) in the 1974 official topographic chart of the area by the Brazilian Institute of Geography and Statistics (IBGE), the government institution that holds the authority for all official geographic information in Brazil. Indeed, in January 2000 a small airplane crashed on a mountain right next to Pedra da Mina, probably due to inaccurate charts, killing its four occupants. The wreckage can still be seen on the mountain, which because of that is now known as Morro do Avião ("Airplane Hill").

=== New elevation measurements and popularization (2000-) ===
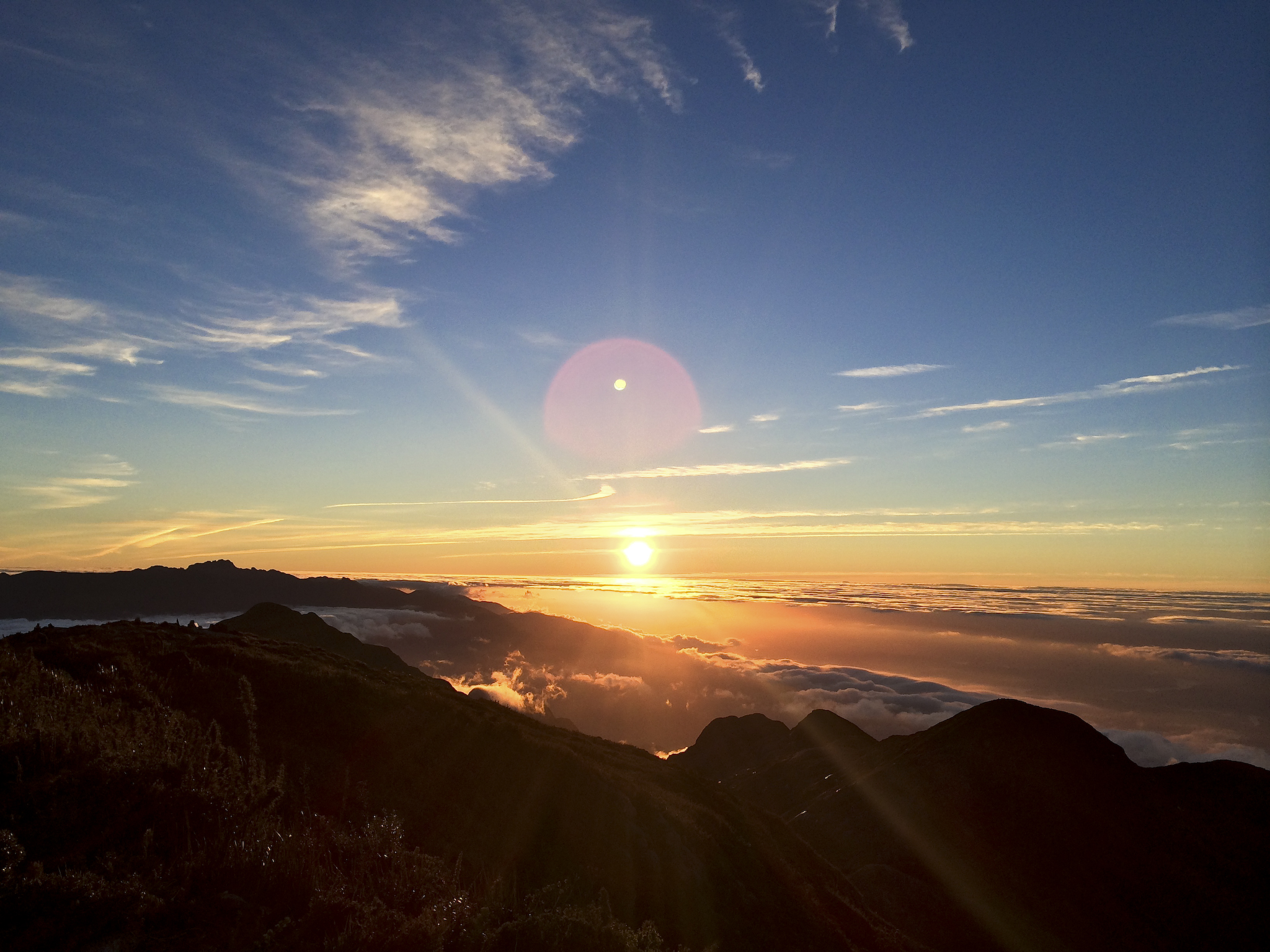
Sunrise seen from the top of Pedra da Mina. The Itatiaia Massif can be seen to the left in the background. Its highest summit, visible in the picture, is Pico das Agulhas Negras, which until 2000 was thought to be the highest point of the Mantiqueira Mountains, but was then found to be actually about 7 metres (23 feet) lower than Pedra da Mina. The two peaks are approximately 20 km (12 mi) apart as the crow flies.

Without a precise measurement of the Serra Fina mountains, until 1999 the highest point of the Mantiqueira Mountains was thought to be the well-known and distinctively shaped Pico das Agulhas Negras, in the Itatiaia Massif, with a then-official height of 2,787 metres (9,144 ft). That year, geographer Lorenzo Giuliano Bagini, then still an undergraduate student at the University of São Paulo (USP) who was also a mountaineer and familiar with the area, suspected that Pedra da Mina might be higher than it was thought and measured its elevation by GPS, obtaining 2,796 metres (9,173 ft), which would make the mountain a few metres higher than Agulhas Negras. He notified the university, which eventually sent an official expedition the following year with high-precision professional GPS equipment, and found an elevation one metre higher still than Bagini's first measurement.

Still, according to Brazilian federal law, no geographic data can be officially accepted in the country if not published by IBGE. Although the USP expedition was very much credible and authoritative, and the accuracy of its measurement was not doubted, IBGE cannot legally accept or recognize any geographic data other than its own; moreover, IBGE uses altimetry methods and georeferencing parameters that are different from USP's. This was one of the motivations for IBGE to launch a project in association with the Brazilian Military Institute of Engineering (IME) to accurately measure the elevation of the highest Brazilian mountains, using the latest GPS technology. Thus, as parts of the project, both Pedra da Mina and Agulhas Negras were climbed in 2004, and their elevation measured. The joint expedition once again confirmed that Pedra da Mina was indeed slightly higher at 2,798.39 metres (9,181.1 ft), compared to 2,791.55 metres (9,158.6 ft) for Agulhas Negras - a 6.84-metre difference. IBGE soon revised its published data to reflect the mountain's new official elevation and ranking.

The fact that the highest point of Brazil's most populous state and of one of the country's most important mountain ranges had been virtually unknown until then caught the country by surprise and was widely reported in the Brazilian press, creating a sensation and a lot of curiosity about it among Brazilian adventurers and mountaineers, who started climbing Pedra da Mina and exploring the Serra Fina range more often.

In 2015, IBGE completed a new and more accurate mapping of the Brazilian territory regarding the geoid, the irregular imaginary surface based on the Earth's gravitational field that is the reference for elevation measurements. This led the institution to recalculate the elevation of the mountains measured in the earlier project, according to the new reference. The new data were published in February 2016. Pedra da Mina's elevation was slightly revised to 2,798.06 metres (9,180.0 ft) - a difference of 33 cm or about one foot. Pico das Agulhas Negras was then found to stand at 2,790.94 metres (9,156.6 ft), a difference of 61 cm or about two feet. Thus, Pedra da Mina slightly increased its advantage over the neighbouring rival to 7.12 metres.

== Topography ==
Considering that the town of Queluz lies only 14 kilometres (8.7 mi) south of the mountain by a straight line, but the town lies on the Paraíba do Sul river valley only 497 metres (1,631 ft) above sea level, Pedra da Mina's southern (São Paulo) slope has one of the largest and most abrupt differences in elevation in Brazil: 2,301 metres (7,549 ft). The southern slope includes a nearly vertical, 100-metre (330-foot) high rock wall near the top, and the slope is so steep that Brazilian climbers planning to climb Aconcagua have been known to use it for practice. By contrast, because the neighbouring area of Minas Gerais to the north is already a high-elevation hilly plateau, the northern slope is much less steep, and the difference in elevation is much smaller.

Just east of the mountain lies the Ruah valley, the highest in Brazil, and to the south is the source of the Claro river, located at about 2,500 metres (8,200 ft) above sea level, which is possibly the highest river source in Brazil, although the title is disputed with the source of the Aiuruoca river in the Itatiaia Massif.

== Access ==
There are four possible ascent routes to Pedra da Mina, but as of 2016, one of them is closed. The mountain is nearly always climbed from the north (Minas Gerais) side, where the shortest route is through a strenuous one-day hike to the top (with a few steeper scramble sections), camping there overnight and returning the next day, on a well-marked trail that starts at a farm next to the hamlet of Paiolinho, near the town of Passa Quatro, at an elevation of 1,566 metres (5,138 ft); the trailhead can be reached by regular vehicles on a dirt road. Alternatively, Pedra da Mina can also be reached as a part of a longer (3-5-day) hike on top of the entire crest of Serra Fina, entering the latter by a more westerly trail starting at a farm called Toca do Lobo, also near Passa Quatro, and finishing at the BR-354 highway, which traverses the Garganta do Registro pass between Serra Fina and the Itatiaia Massif. The longer hike can be made either eastward or westward, and these would be the two other feasible access routes.

The fourth route would be from the southern (São Paulo) slope, starting just north of Queluz. This is known as the Claro River Trail (Portuguese: Trilha do Rio Claro) because it follows that river valley up until its source near Pedra da Mina's top. This route is extremely difficult and dangerous, though. It requires almost vertical rock climbing in some sections (particularly near the top), traversing steep boulder fields in others, and presents several other difficulties. The area is so hardly accessible that search and rescue would only be possible by helicopter in most of the trail. The greatest hindrance, however, is that the mountain's entire southern slope is private property (a farm and private nature reserve which reaches up to the state border at the ridge crest), and the owners no longer authorize passage. So, as of 2016 this route is off-limits and unfeasible.

In spite of the intense cold by Brazilian standards, with subfreezing temperatures and frost common in the Southern Hemisphere winter months (May–September), this is the recommended season for climbing Pedra da Mina, as summer (October–April) is also the rainy season in this part of Brazil, which makes the trails slippery and dangerous, with lightning also a concern. There are few sources of potable water, some of them hard to reach, and climbers must plan accordingly, especially on the longer Serra Fina trail route. This forces mountaineers to carry additional weight because of the water they need to take, making the hike even more strenuous. First-timers should consider taking a local guide, who can be hired in Passa Quatro.

Pedra da Mina and Serra Fina were once regarded as the most difficult Brazilian mountain area to hike and climb, because of the range's very cold and inhospitable conditions, relative remoteness, irregular terrain, unstable weather (particularly in summer), lack of potable water, and thick vegetation on the slopes, but after the range became better known and explored, trails were better marked and a wealth of on-line information allowed mountaineers to better prepare themselves, it is now one of the most visited areas by Brazilian mountaineers. It is estimated that just during the Corpus Christi extended holiday of June 2011, approximately 250 people attempted the traverse of Serra Fina and hence passed through Pedra da Mina (not all of them on top of the mountain at the same time), not counting those who climbed Pedra da Mina by the direct Paiolinho trail.
