= Pico dos Três Estados =

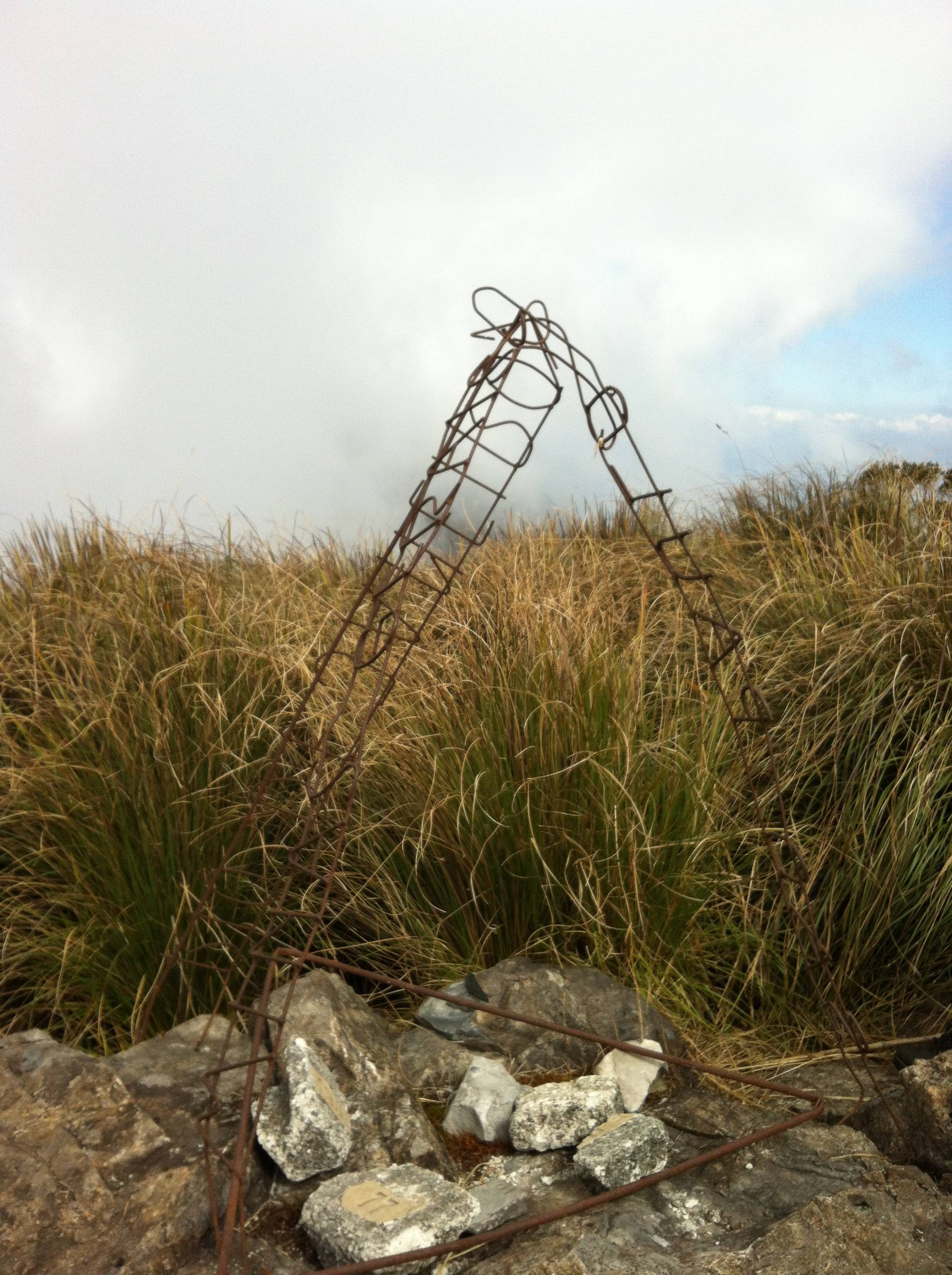
- Summit of the peak

Highest point
- Elevation: 2,665 m (8,743 ft)
- Coordinates: 22°24′22″S 44°48′34″W

Naming
- English translation: Three States Peak
- Language of name: Portuguese

Geography
- Location within Brazil
- Location: Southeast Region, Brazil
- States: Minas Gerais, Rio de Janeiro and São Paulo
- Parent range: Mantiqueira Mountains

Pico dos Três Estados ("Three States Peak") is a mountain peak at which the three Brazilian states of Minas Gerais, Rio de Janeiro, and São Paulo all meet, respectively in the municipalities of Passa Quatro, Resende and Queluz.

At an altitude of 2,665 metres (8,743 ft), the peak is located within the Mantiqueira Mountains near Pedra da Mina and Pico das Agulhas Negras. At the exact point where the three borders meet, there is an iron tripod with the names of each state.
