= Boana beckeri =

Conservation status
- Data Deficient (IUCN 3.1)

Scientific classification
- Kingdom: Animalia
- Phylum: Chordata
- Class: Amphibia
- Order: Anura
- Family: Hylidae
- Genus: Boana
- Species: B. beckeri

Binomial name
- Boana beckeri (Caramaschi and Cruz, 2004)

Synonyms
- Hyla beckeri Caramaschi and Cruz, 2004; Hypsiboas beckeri (Caramaschi and Cruz, 2004)

Species of frog

Boana beckeri is a species of frog in the family Hylidae. It is endemic to Brazil and is only known from a handful of localities in southern Minas Gerais and adjacent northeastern São Paulo. The specific name beckeri honors Johann Becker, Brazilian zoologist who collected many of the types.

== Description ==
Adult males measure 24–29 mm (0.9–1.1 in) and adult females 32–34 mm (1.3–1.3 in) in snout–vent length. The tympanum is distinct. The eyes are prominent. The fingers and toes bear terminal discs and are partially webbed. The dorsum has four narrow longitudinal light brown stripes, intercalated by three brown stripes outlined by a cream line. There is also a pair of dark brown lateral stripes, delimited by a white-silvery line above and by a narrow white-silvery stripe below. Males have a single subgular vocal sac.

There are two types of male advertisement calls. Type "a" call is "harsh" call consisting of a single pulsed note. Type "b" call is a trill of unpulsed notes.

== Habitat and conservation ==
Boana beckeri occurs in montane Atlantic forest or remnants thereof at elevations of 830–1,290 m (2,720–4,230 ft) above sea level. Males have been observed calling during nighttime perched on bushes or grasses at the margins of small streams and ponds. It appears to be locally common. As of late 2020, the listing of this species in the IUCN Red List of Threatened Species dates from 2006 when it was only known from a single population. At the time, Boana beckeri was considered "data deficient".
