= Córrego do Bom Jesus =

Coordinates: 22°38′S 46°02′W

- Municipality
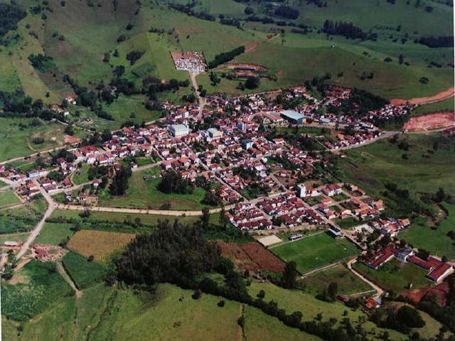
- Aerial view of Córrego do Bom Jesus

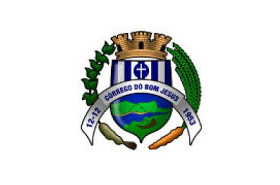
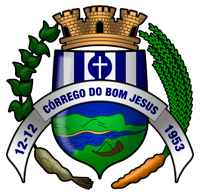
- Flag Coat of arms
- Interactive map of Córrego do Bom Jesus
- Country: Brazil
- Region: Southeast
- State: Minas Gerais
- Mesoregion: Sud/Sudoeste de Minas

Population (2020)
  - Total: 3,694
- Time zone: UTC−3 (BRT)

Córrego do Bom Jesus is a municipality in the state of Minas Gerais in the Southeast region of Brazil.

== See also ==
- List of municipalities in Minas Gerais
