= Bueno Brandão =

- Municipality
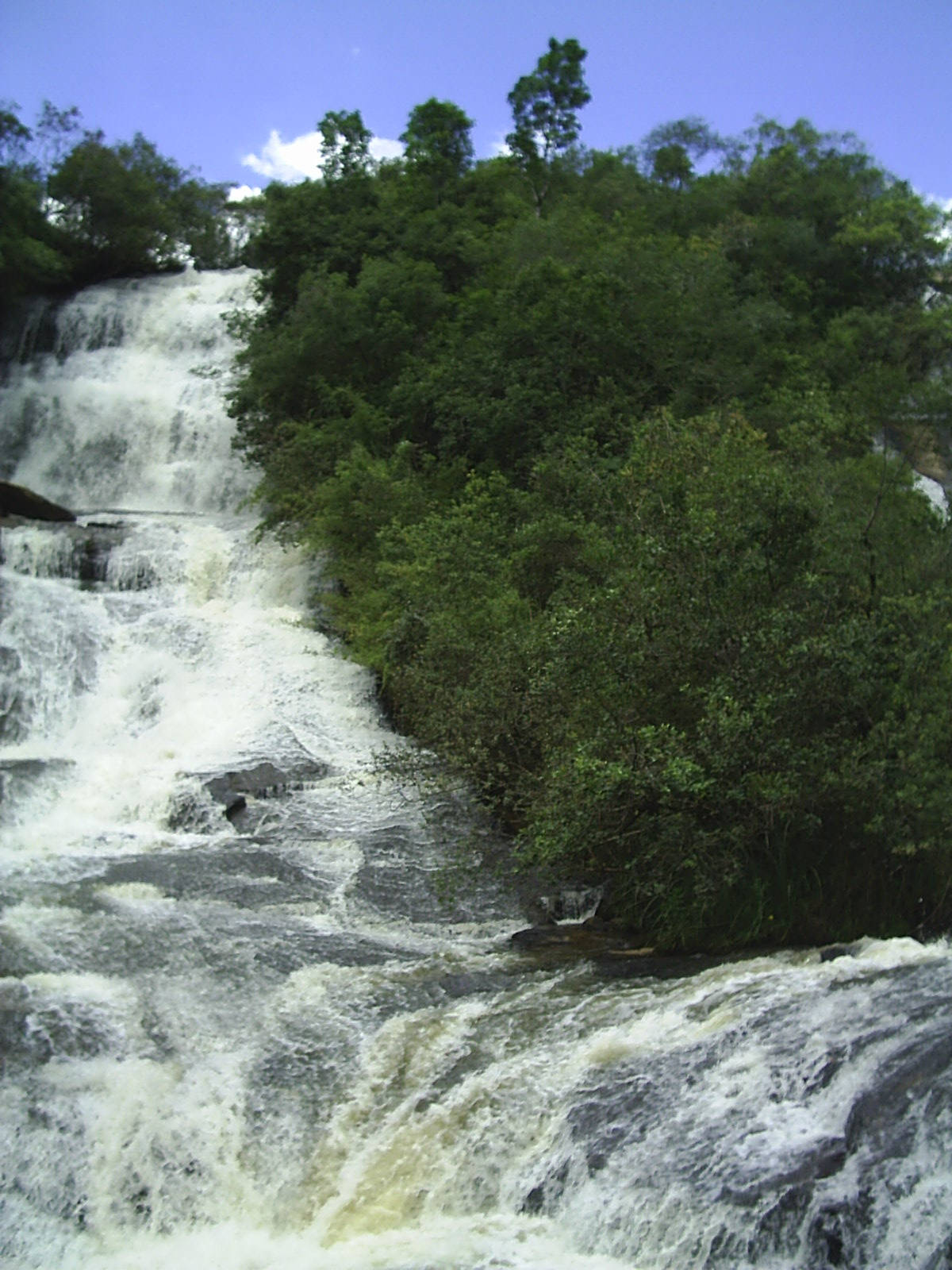
- Bueno Brandão

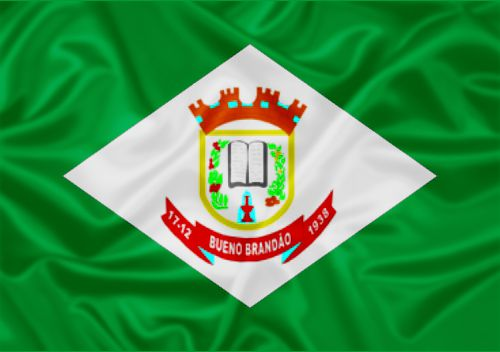
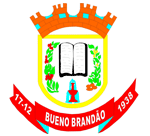
- Flag Coat of arms
- Nicknames: Bueno, Cidade das Cachoeiras (Waterfall city)

- Location in Brazil
- Coordinates: 22°27′S 46°21′W
- Country: Brazil
- Region: Southeast
- State: Minas Gerais
- Mesoregion: Sud/Sudoeste de Minas

Area
  - Total: 137.156 sq mi (355.233 km^{2})
- Elevation: 3,950 ft (1,204 m)

Population (2020)
  - Total: 10,991
- Time zone: UTC−3 (BRT)
- CEP: 37578-000
- Area code: +55 35
- Website: http://buenobrandao.com.br/

Bueno Brandão is a municipality in the state of Minas Gerais in the Southeast region of Brazil.

== See also ==
- List of municipalities in Minas Gerais
