= Itamonte =

- Municipality
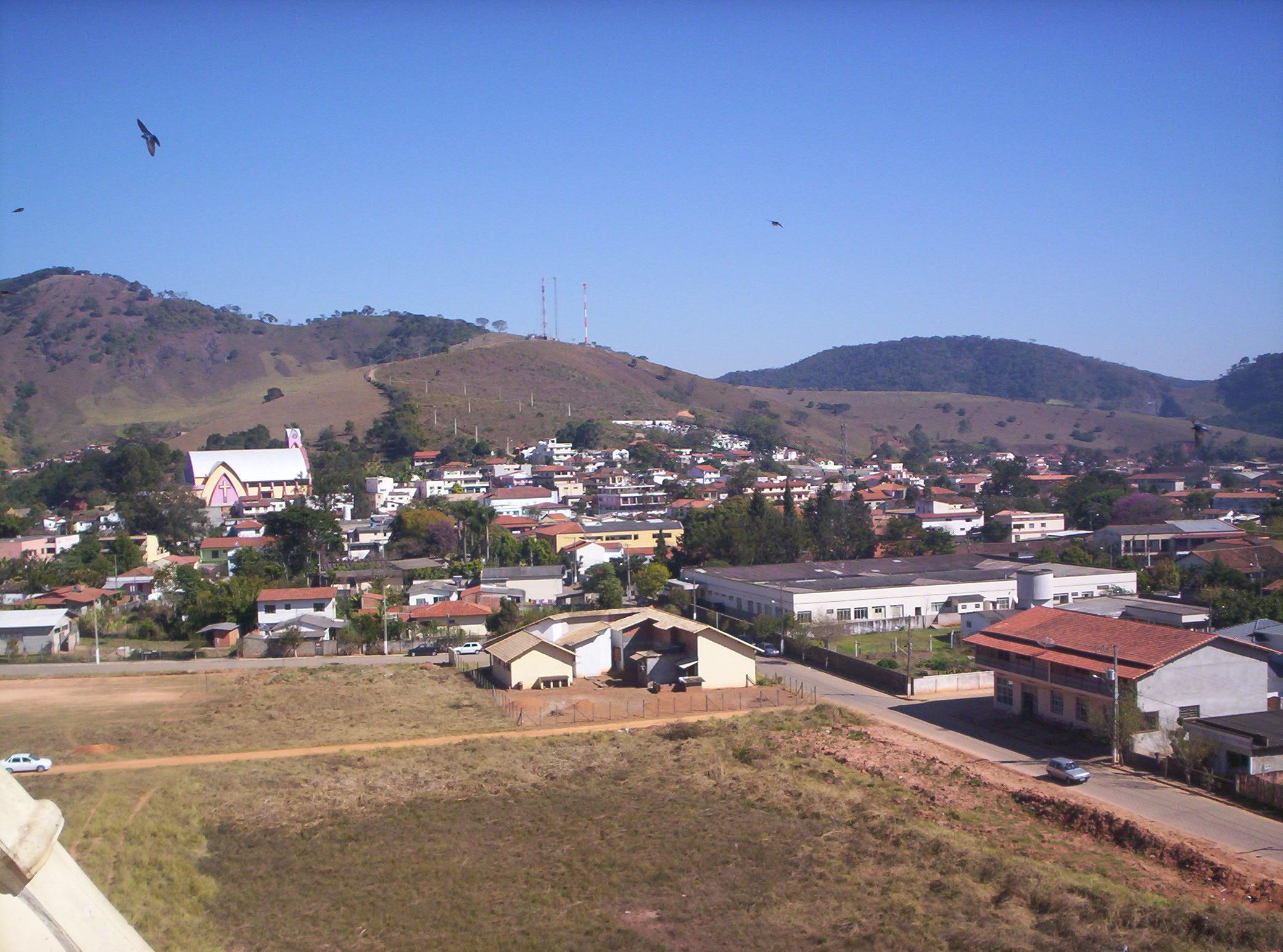

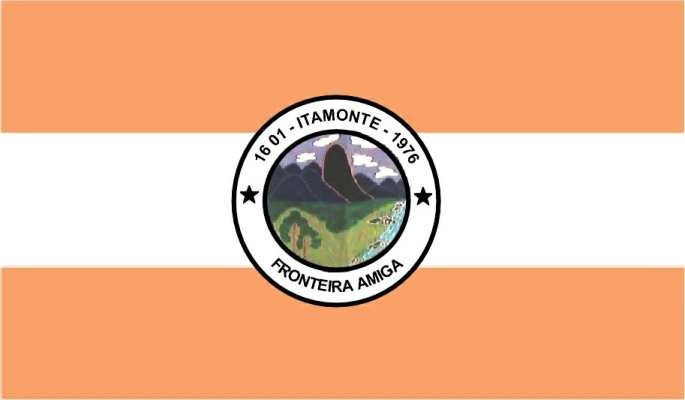
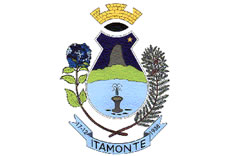
- Flag Coat of arms

- Location in Brazil
- Coordinates: 22°17′S 44°53′W
- Country: Brazil
- Region: Southeast
- State: Minas Gerais

Area
  - Total: 432 km^{2} (167 sq mi)

Population (2020)
  - Total: 15,714
  - Density: 36.4/km^{2} (94.2/sq mi)
- Time zone: UTC−3 (BRT)

Itamonte is a city in the south of Minas Gerais, Brazil. Its population was 15,714 (2020) and its area is 432 km^{2} (167 sq mi).

== Geography ==
Itamonte is a touristic city in the Serra da Mantiqueira mountains. The territorial area is 430.597 km^{2} (166.254 sq mi) big. The city's current mayor is Alexandre Augusto Moreira Santos, with Marcia Castilho being deputy mayor.

The municipality contains 34.54% of the 22,917-hectare (56,630-acre) Serra do Papagaio State Park, created in 1998.

== See also ==
- List of municipalities in Minas Gerais
