= Virgínia =

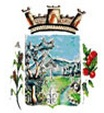
- Coat of arms

- Location in the State of Minas Gerais
- Coordinates: 22°19′58″S 45°05′31″W
- Country: Brazil
- Region: Southeast
- State: Minas Gerais
- Founded: August 30, 1911

Government
  - Mayor: Kadu do João Bosco (PMDB)

Area
  - Total: 326.418 km^{2} (126.031 sq mi)
- Elevation: 945 m (3,100 ft)

Population (2020)
  - Total: 8,663
  - Density: 27/km^{2} (70/sq mi)
- Time zone: UTC−3 (BST)
- Postal Code: 37465-000

Virgínia is a Brazilian municipality in the state of Minas Gerais. As of 2020 its population is estimated to be 8,663.

== See also ==
- List of municipalities in Minas Gerais
