= Bom Repouso =

Coordinates: 22°28′S 46°09′W

- Municipality
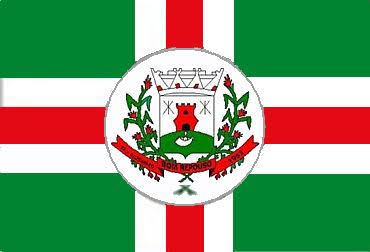
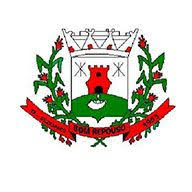
- Flag Coat of arms
- Interactive map of Bom Repouso
- Country: Brazil
- Region: Southeast
- State: Minas Gerais
- Mesoregion: Oeste de Minas

Population (2020)
  - Total: 10,537
- Time zone: UTC−3 (BRT)

Bom Repouso is a municipality in the state of Minas Gerais in the Southeast region of Brazil.

== See also ==
- List of municipalities in Minas Gerais
