= Piranguçu =

- Municipality
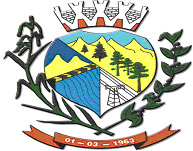
- Coat of arms

- Location in the State of Minas Gerais
- Coordinates: 22°31′40″S 45°29′42″W
- Country: Brazil
- Region: Southeast
- State: Minas Gerais
- Founded: December 30, 1962

Area
  - Total: 206.417 km^{2} (79.698 sq mi)

Population (2020)
  - Total: 5,488
  - Density: 25.8/km^{2} (67/sq mi)
- Time zone: UTC−3 (BDT)
- Postal Code: 37511-000

Piranguçu is a municipality in the state of Minas Gerais in the Southeast region of Brazil.

== See also ==
- List of municipalities in Minas Gerais
