= Munhoz =

Coordinates: 22°37′S 46°22′W

- Municipality
- Interactive map of Munhoz
- Country: Brazil
- Region: Southeast
- State: Minas Gerais
- Mesoregion: Sud/Sudoeste de Minas

Population (2020)
  - Total: 5,994
- Time zone: UTC−3 (BRT)

Munhoz is a municipality in the state of Minas Gerais in the Southeast region of Brazil.

== See also ==
- List of municipalities in Minas Gerais
