= Camanducaia =

- Municipality
- Municipality of Camanducaia
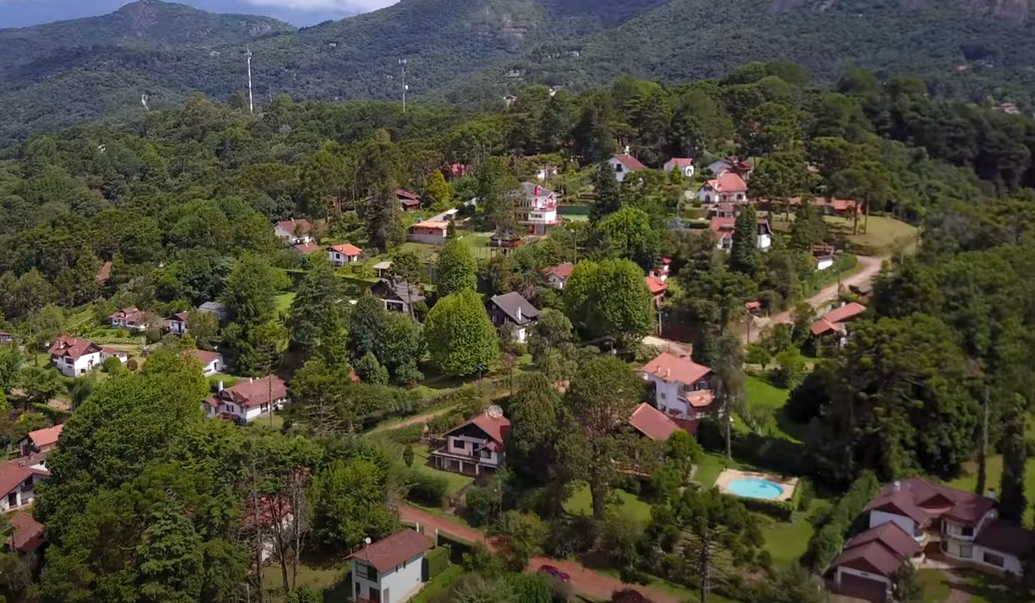
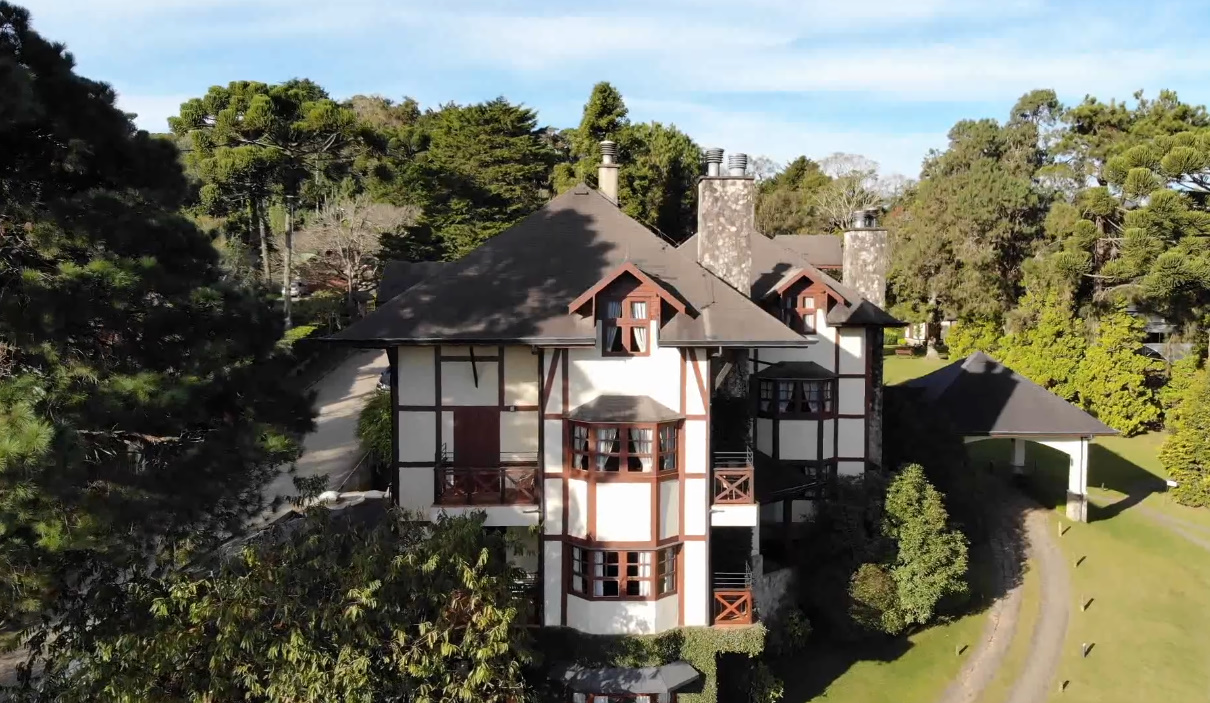
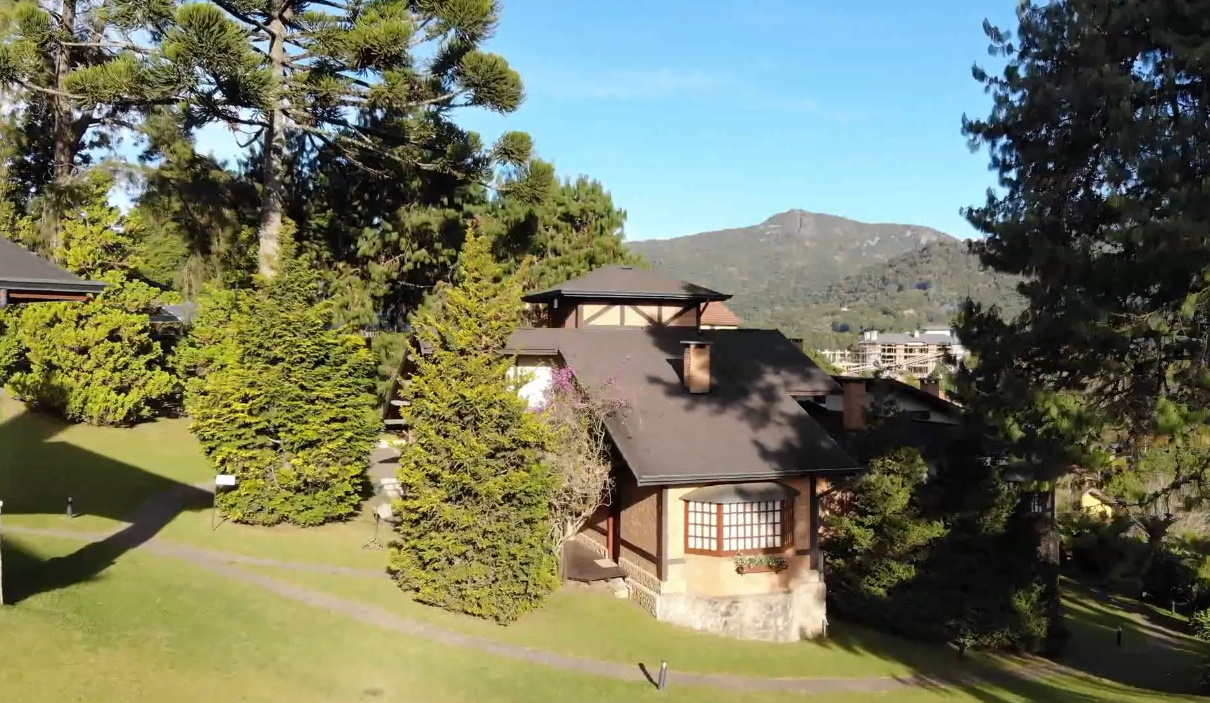
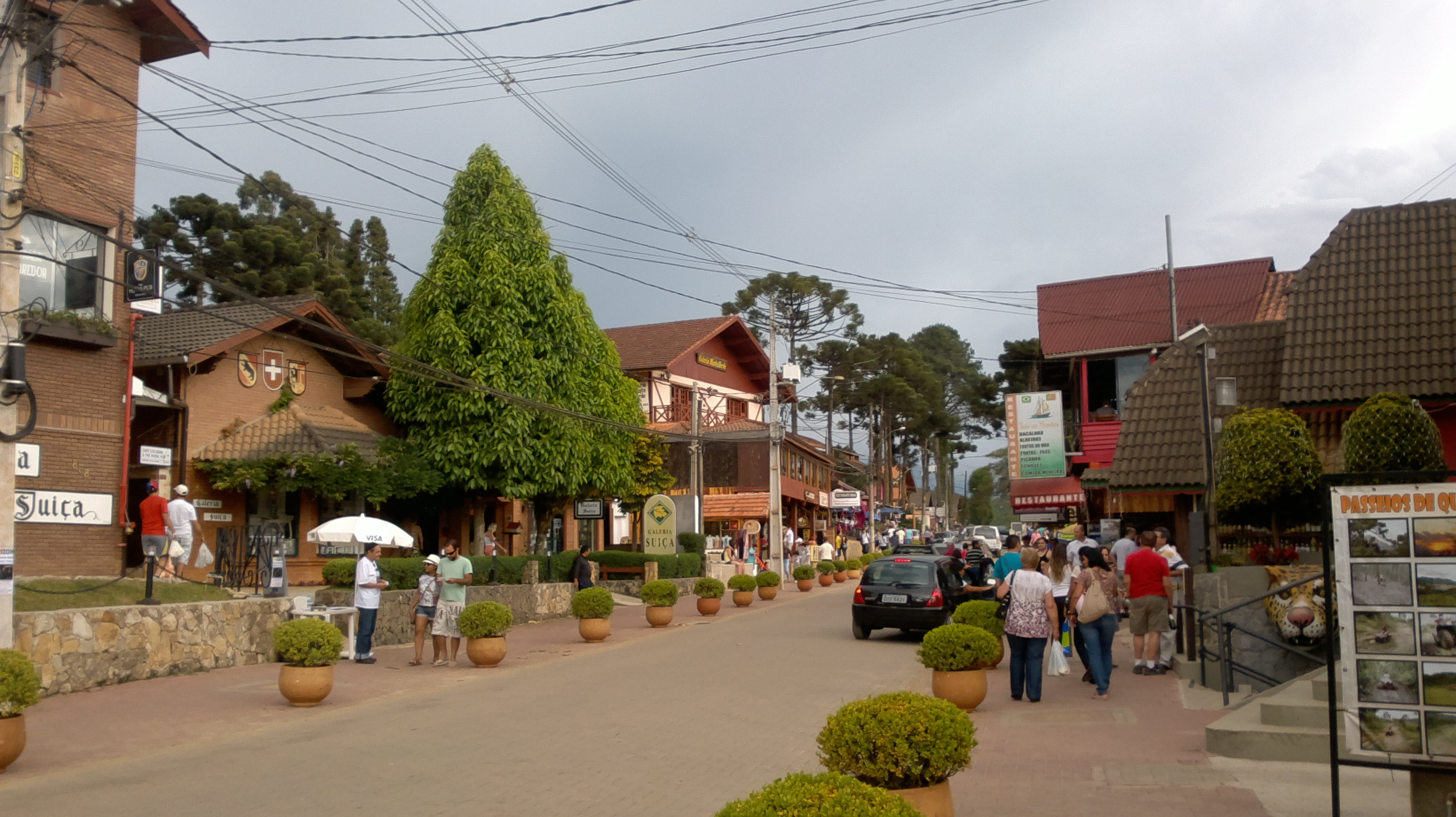
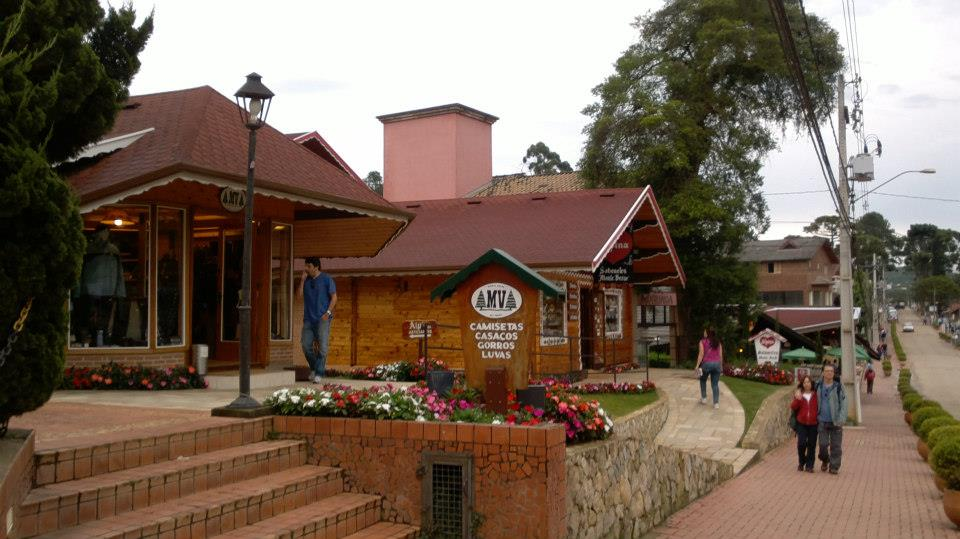
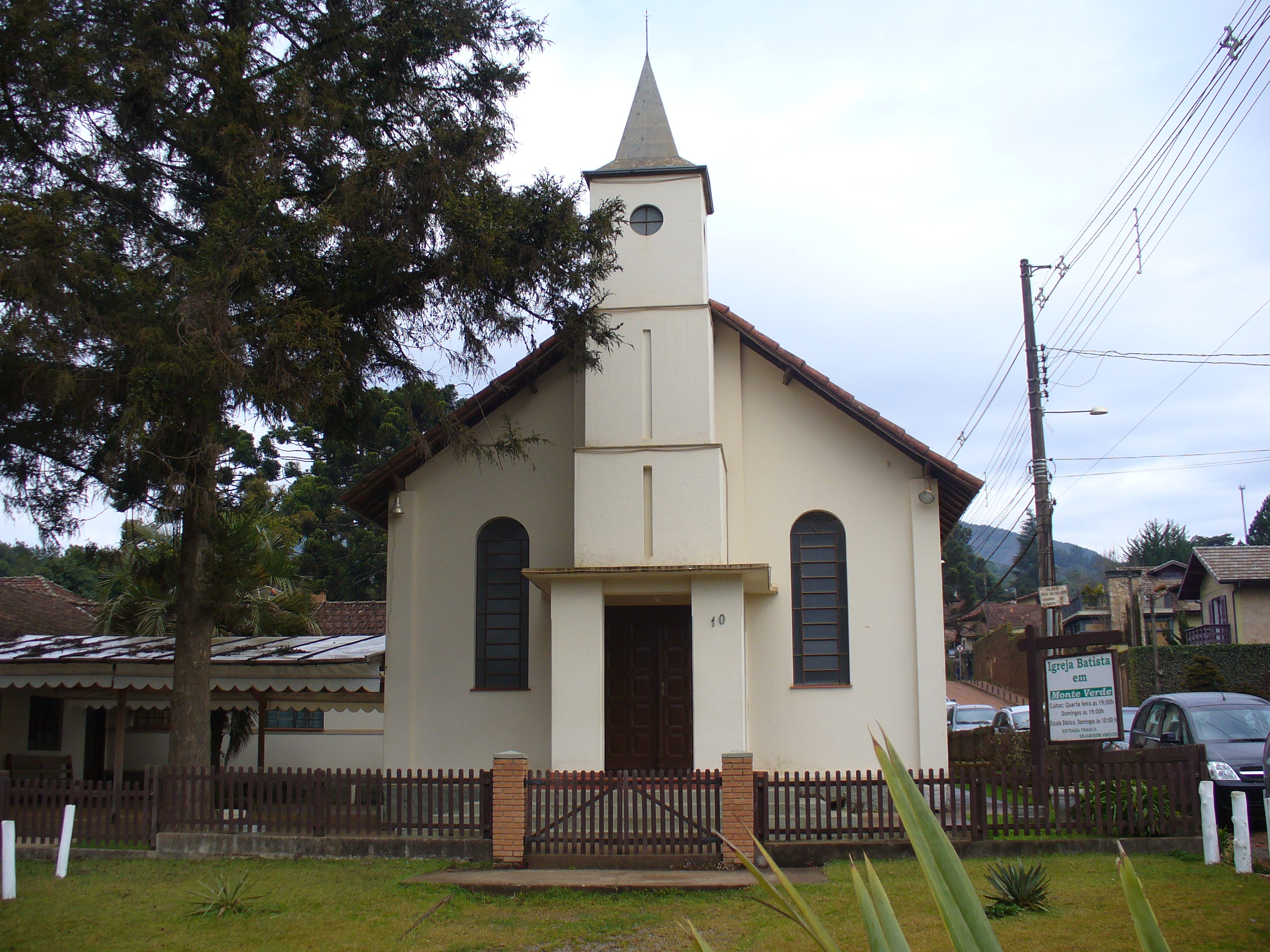
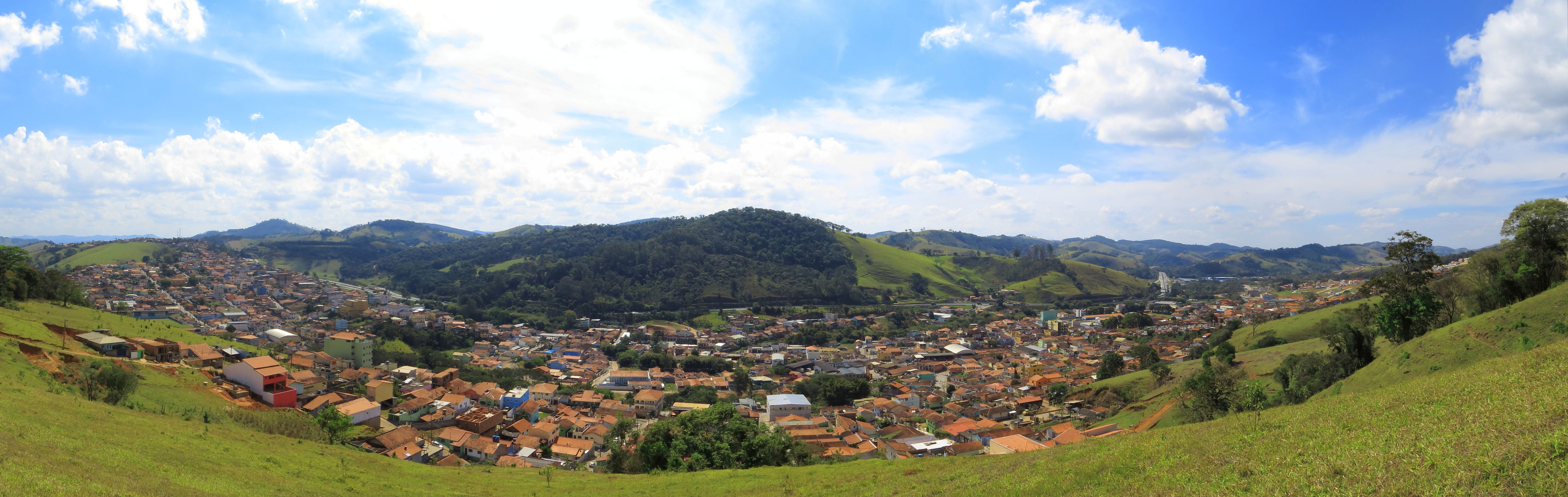

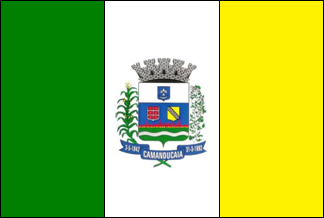
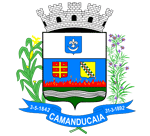
- Flag Coat of arms
- Nicknames: Campos Queimados
- Location in Minas Gerais
- Coordinates: 14°25′03″S 44°22′13″W
- Country: Brazil
- Region: Southeast
- State: Minas Gerais
- Founded: July 20, 1868

Government
  - Mayor: Edmar Cassalho Moreira Dias (PMDB)

Area
  - Total: 527.572 km^{2} (203.697 sq mi)
- Elevation: 1,015 m (3,330 ft)

Population (2020)
  - Total: 21,801
  - Density: 40/km^{2} (100/sq mi)
- Time zone: UTC-3 (UTC-3)
  - Summer (DST): UTC-2 (UTC-2)
- HDI (2010): 0.689 – medium

Camanducaia is the southernmost municipality in Minas Gerais, Brazil. The population was 21,801 in 2020. The Monte Verde district is located in Camanducaia. The municipality contains part of the 180,373-hectare (445,710-acre) Fernão Dias Environmental Protection Area, created in 1997.

== See also ==
- List of municipalities in Minas Gerais
