= Itanhandu =

Coordinates: 22°18′S 44°57′W

- Aerial view

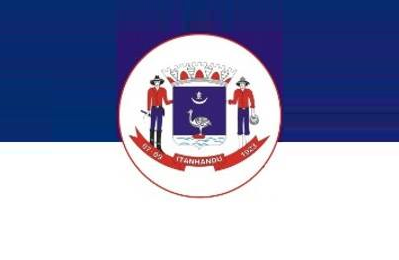
- Flag Coat of arms
- Interactive map of Itanhandu
- Country: Brazil
- State: Minas Gerais
- Mesoregion: Sudoeste de Minas
- Microregion: São Lourenço
- Municipality: Itanhandu

Area
  - Total: 143.9 km^{2} (55.6 sq mi)

Population (2020)
  - Total: 15,423
- Time zone: UTC−3 (BRT)

Itanhandu is a city in the south of Minas Gerais, Brazil with a population of 15,423 as of 2020 and a total area of 143.9 km^{2} (55.6 sq mi).

== See also ==
- List of municipalities in Minas Gerais
