= Marmelópolis =

- Municipality
- Marmelópolis
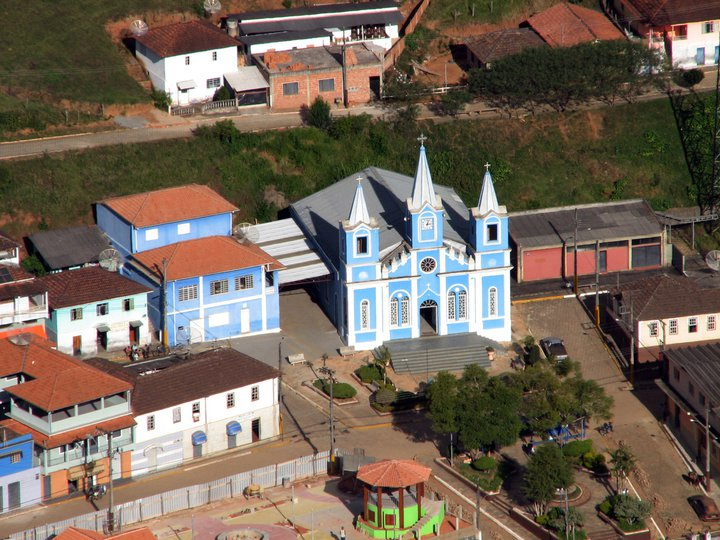
- View of Marmelópolis

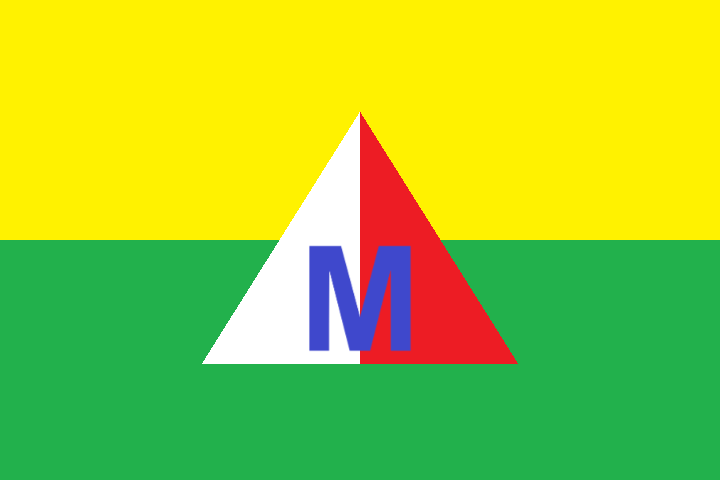
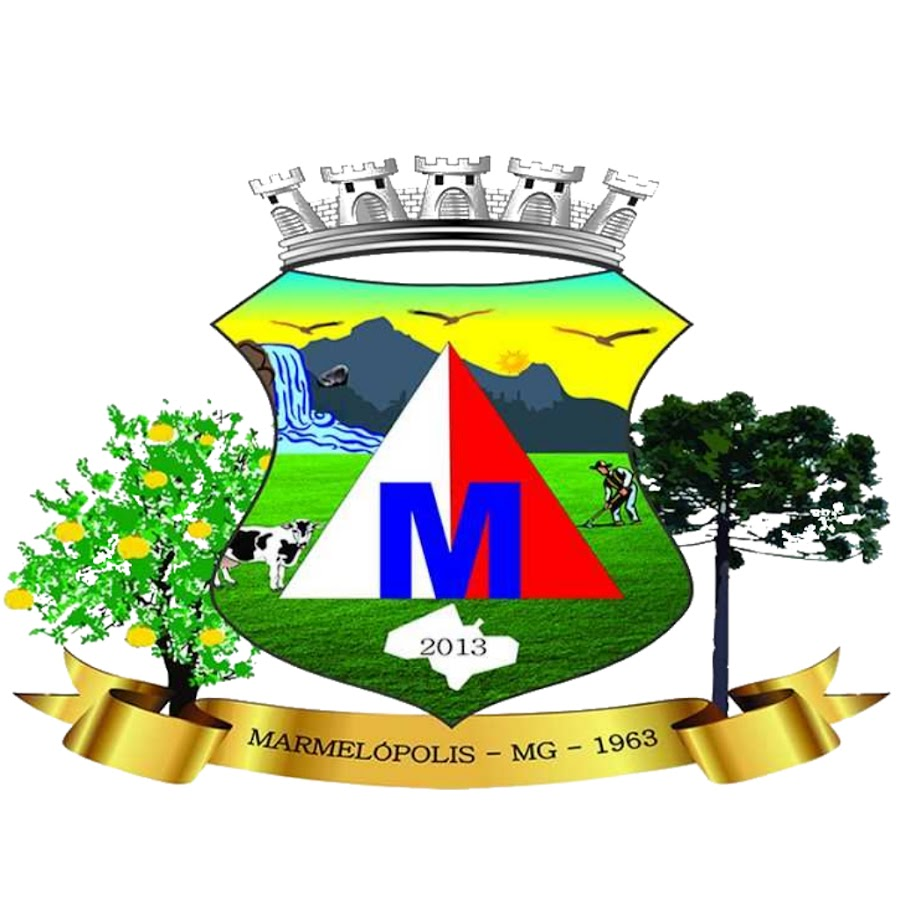
- Flag Coat of arms
- Nickname: Marmelópolis
- Location in the State of Minas Gerais

- Location within Brazil
- Coordinates: 22°26′56″S 45°09′54″W
- Country: Brazil
- Region: Southeast
- State: Minas Gerais
- Founded: December 31, 1962

Area
  - Total: 107.861 km^{2} (41.645 sq mi)
- Elevation: 1,277 m (4,190 ft)

Population (2020)
  - Total: 2,728
  - Density: 32.9/km^{2} (85/sq mi)
- Time zone: UTC−3 (BST)
- Postal Code: 37516-000
- Website: www.marmelopolis.mg.gov.br

Marmelópolis is a municipality in the state of Minas Gerais in the Southeast region of Brazil.

== Geography ==
It lies on the boundary of the state of Minas Gerais at 1277 meters elevation, having an area of 108.1 km^{2} in the municipality.

The physical area is made up for the most part of mountainous terrain of The Mantiqueira Mountains. The name Mantiqueira derives from a [Tupi-Guarani] word meaning "mountains that cry", denoting the large number of springs and streams found there. Part of Marins peak is located in Marmelópolis. This is a beautiful landscape with a peaceful mood on it.

Marmelópolis occupies a highly strategic geographical location, due to its proximity to São Paulo (260 km), Belo Horizonte (460 km) and Rio de Janeiro (420 km), whose connections are made with good highways.

=== Climate ===
The climate is characterized by dry winters and mild summers. The winter is from April to September and has an average temperature of 15 °C and rainfall of 315 mm. The summer is from October to March and has an average temperature of 21 °C with rainfall of 1,430 mm. The annual rainfall is 1,745 mm. The average annual temperature is 17 °C with minimums of -6 °C and maximums of 31.7 °C.

== See also ==
- List of municipalities in Minas Gerais
