= Wenceslau Braz, Minas Gerais =

Wenceslau Braz
- Municipality
- Municipality of Wenceslau Braz
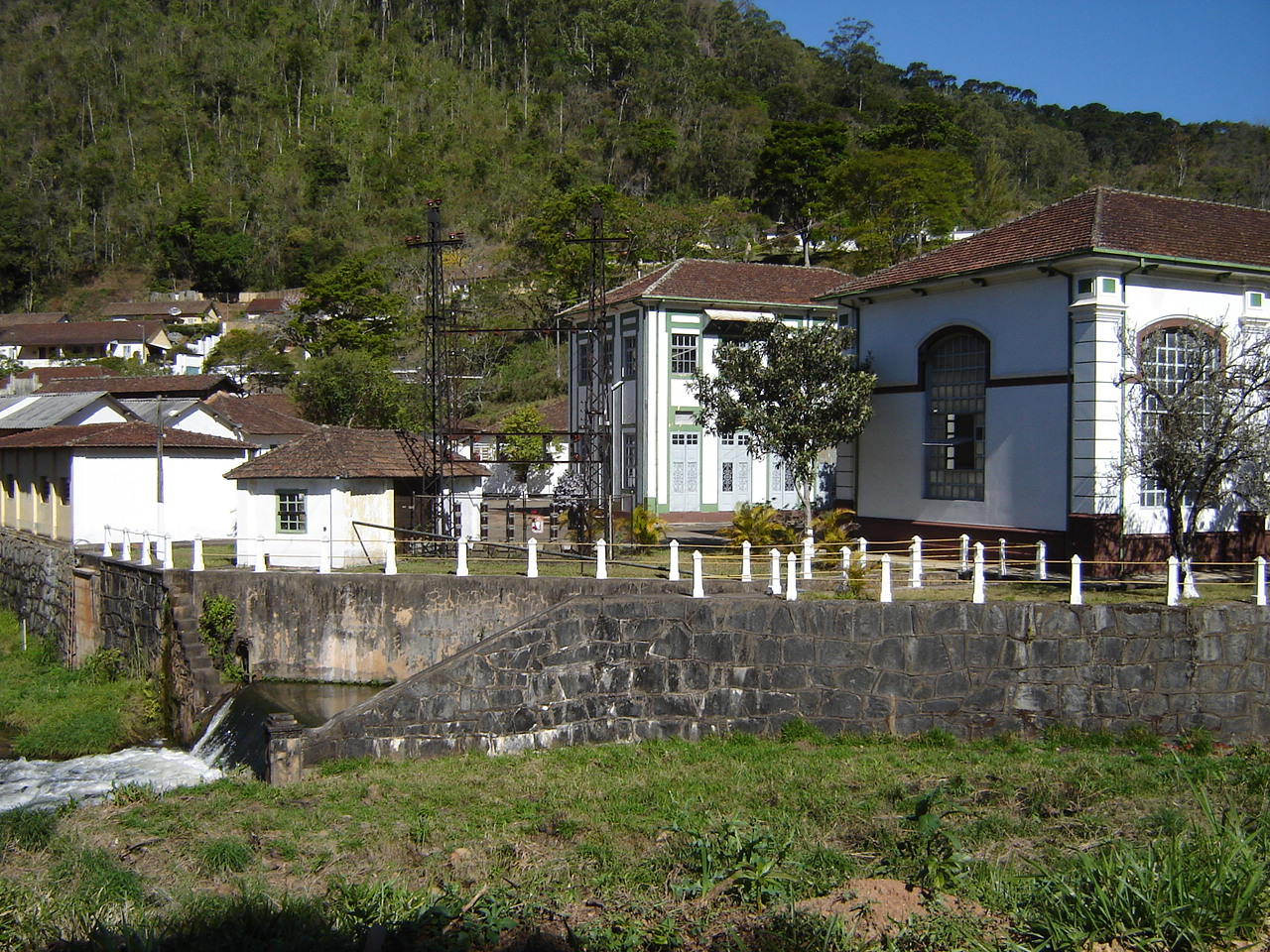
- View of Wenceslau Braz

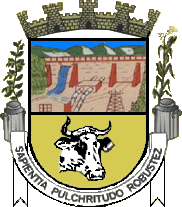
- Coat of arms

- Location in Minas Gerais

- Location in Brazil
- Coordinates: 22°32′02″S 45°21′46″W
- Country: Brazil
- Region: Southeast
- State: Minas Gerais
- Founded: December 30, 1962

Area
  - Total: 102.487 km^{2} (39.570 sq mi)
- Elevation: 1,005 m (3,297 ft)

Population (2020)
  - Total: 2,548
- Time zone: UTC−3 (BRT)
- Postal code: 37512-000
- Area code: 35
- Website: wenceslaubraz.mg.gov.br

Wenceslau Braz is a Brazilian municipality in the state of Minas Gerais. As of 2020, its population was estimated to be 2,548.

== History ==
=== Hydroelectric plant ===
Between 1922 and 1932, German engineers constructed a 3.4 MW hydroelectric power station (Hidrelétrica Bicas do Meio) for the Itajubá Piquete power grid company (REPI). Two transmission lines, mounted on steel lattice poles, supplied energy to the towns of Piquete and Itajubá and nearby weapon manufacturers.
