= Delfim Moreira, Minas Gerais =

Delfim Moreira
- Municipality
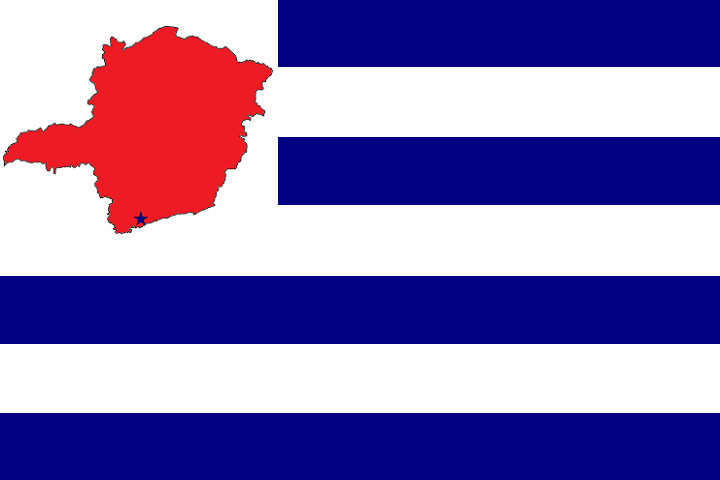
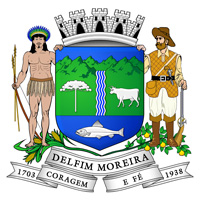
- Flag Coat of arms

- Location in the State of Minas Gerais
- Coordinates: 22°30′32″S 45°16′48″W
- Country: Brazil
- Region: Southeast
- State: Minas Gerais
- Founded: December 17, 1938

Area
  - Total: 408.181 km^{2} (157.600 sq mi)
- Elevation: 1,200 m (3,900 ft)

Population (2020)
  - Total: 8,016
  - Density: 20/km^{2} (52/sq mi)
- Time zone: UTC−3 (BRT)
- Postal Code: 37508-000

Delfim Moreira, Minas Gerais is a municipality in the state of Minas Gerais in the Southeast region of Brazil. The lowest temperature ever registered in Delfim Moreira was −10.1 °C (13.8 °F), on July 23, 2021.

== See also ==
- List of municipalities in Minas Gerais
