= Gonçalves, Minas Gerais =

- Municipality
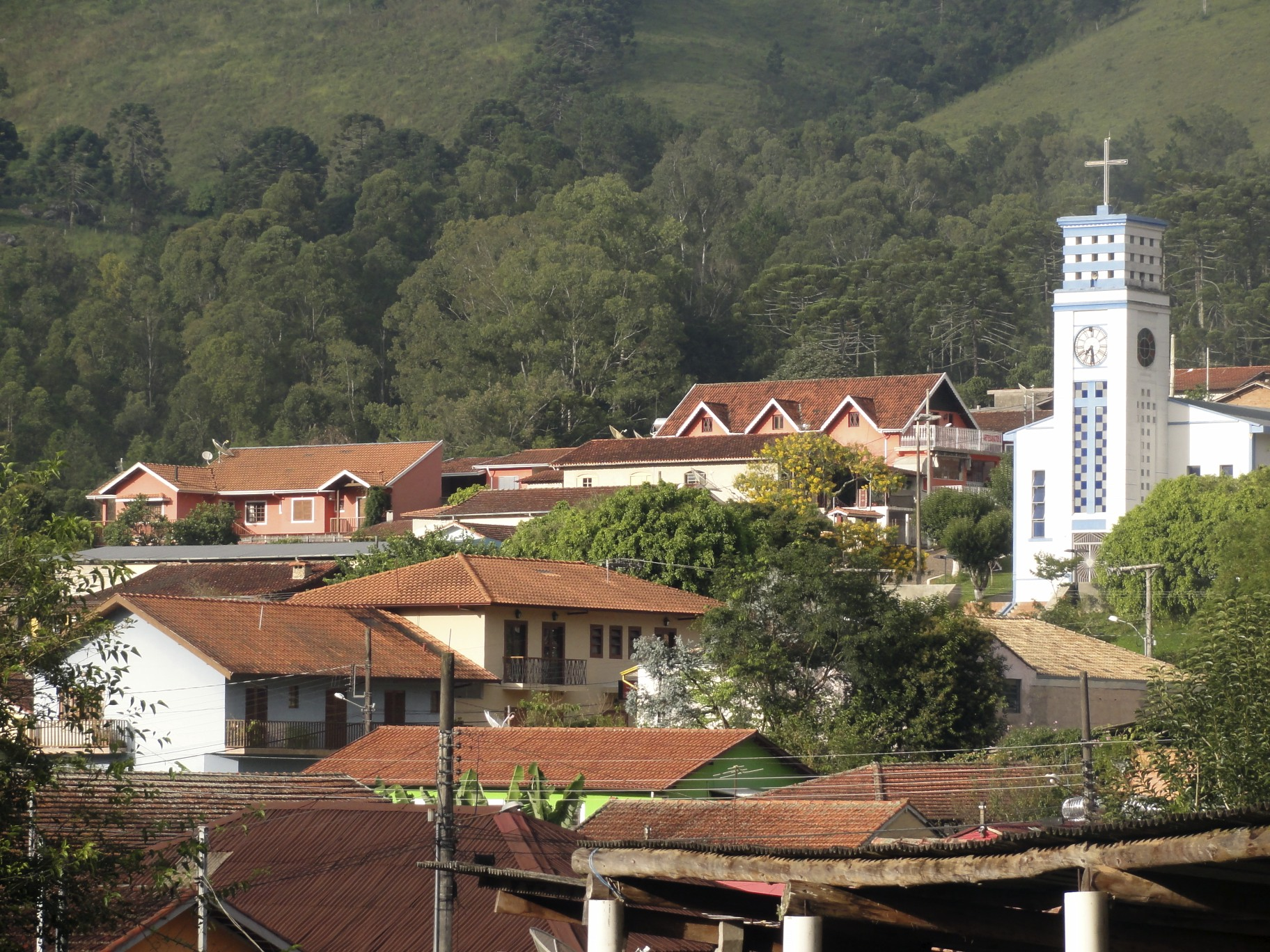
- Downtown area of Gonçalves

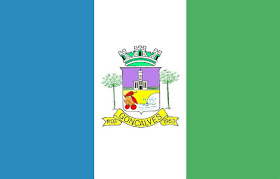
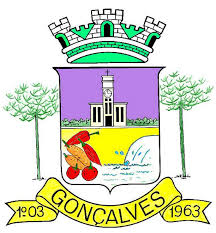
- Flag Coat of arms

- Location in Brazil
- Coordinates: 22°39′32″S 45°51′21″W
- Country: Brazil
- Region: Southeast
- State: Minas Gerais
- Mesoregion: Sud/Sudoeste de Minas
- Founded: March 1, 1963

Area
  - Total: 72,431 sq mi (187,596 km^{2})
- Highest elevation: 6,900 ft (2,100 m)
- Lowest elevation: 3,150 ft (960 m)

Population (2020)
  - Total: 4,355
  - Density: 58/sq mi (22.5/km^{2})
- Demonym: Gonçalvense
- Time zone: UTC−3 (BRT)

Gonçalves, Minas Gerais is a municipality in the state of Minas Gerais in the Southeast region of Brazil.

The municipality contains part of the 180,373 hectares (445,710 acres) Fernão Dias Environmental Protection Area, created in 1997.

== See also ==
- List of municipalities in Minas Gerais
