= Mantiqueira Mosaic =

Protected area mosaic in Brazil

- Mosaico Mantiqueira
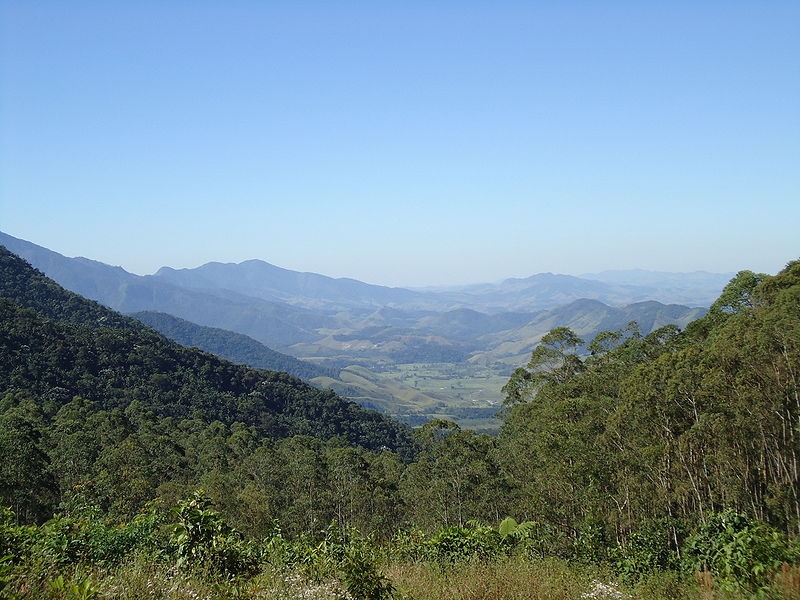
- Serrinha do Alambari

- Location within Brazil
- Coordinates: 22°41′44″S 45°34′06″W
- Area: 445,615 hectares (1,101,140 acres)
- Designation: Protected area mosaic
- Created: 11 December 2006
- Administrator: Conselho Consultivo do Mosaico Mantiqueira

The Mantiqueira Mosaic (Portuguese: Mosaico Mantiqueira) is a protected area mosaic that contains conservation units in the states of Rio de Janeiro, São Paulo and Minas Gerais, Brazil. The conservation units are of different types and are managed at the federal, state or municipal level. The mosaic provides a level of integrated and coordinated management.

== Location ==
The Serra da Mantiqueira is one of the largest of the mountain ranges of southeastern Brazil, extending over parts of the states of São Paulo, Rio de Janeiro and Minas Gerais. These states produce half the gross domestic product (GDP) of Brazil. Altitudes range from 700 metres (2,300 ft) to the 2,798 metres (9,180 ft) Pedra da Mina. The range contains Atlantic Forest vegetation of great ecological importance, including meadows, forest and enclaves of Araucaria angustifolia forest. It supplies water to rivers including the Paraná, Verde, Grande, Jaguari River, Sapucaí, Sapucaí-Mirim and Paraíba do Sul. These are important sources of water for the metropolitan region of São Paulo and most of the state of Rio de Janeiro.

== History ==
A project to create three new protected area mosaics in the Serra do Mar Ecological Corridor began in December 2005, coordinated by the National Council of the Atlantic Forest Biosphere Reserve. These were the Bocaina Mosaic, Central Rio de Janeiro Atlantic Forest Mosaic and Mantiqueira Mosaic. Funding was provided by Conservation International, the Fund for the Global Environment Facility (GEF), the Government of Japan, the MacArthur Foundation and the World Bank.

The Mantiqueira Mosaic was created by decree 351 of 11 December 2006. The Ministry of the Environment gave the mosaics formal structure in March 2007. Their purpose is to give integrated management of different conservation units in a region, including federal, state, municipal and private units, which may be different form of strictly protected or sustainable use unit.

The conservation units within the mosaic are in different stages of development. The fully protected areas are making progress to completing the land regularization process, where the titles of former owners are transferred to the state after compensation. Most of the units have consultative councils, but only a few have developed detailed management plans. The consultative council of the mosaic is composed of managers of the component units, some of whom represent more than one unit, and representatives of civil society.

== Extent ==
The mosaic includes 17 public conservation units and several private natural heritage reserves. It covers about 729,138 hectares (1,801,740 acres), of which 434,108 hectares (1,072,700 acres) corresponds to the Serra da Mantiqueira Environmental Protection Area. Conservation units include:

| Unit | Level | Area (ha) | Created | State |
|---|---|---|---|---|
| Cachoeira da Fumaça e Jacuba Natural Park | Municipal | 363 | 2009 | Rio de Janeiro |
| Campos do Jordão Environmental Protection Area | State | 28,800 | 1984 | São Paulo |
| Campos do Jordão State Park | State | 8,341 | 1941 | São Paulo |
| Fernão Dias Environmental Protection Area | State | 180,073 | 1997 | Minas Gerais |
| Itatiaia National Park | Federal | 30,000 | 1937 | Rio de Janeiro; Minas Gerais |
| Lorena National Forest | Federal | 249 | 2001 | São Paulo |
| Mananciais de Campos do Jordão State Park | State | 503 | 1993 | São Paulo |
| Mananciais do Rio Paraíba do Sul Environmental Protection Area | Federal | 336,416 | 1982 | São Paulo; Minas Gerais; Rio de Janeiro |
| Passa Quatro National Forest | Federal | 350 | 1968 | Minas Gerais |
| Pedra Selada State Park | State | 8,036 | 2012 | Rio de Janeiro |
| Rio Pombo Nature Park (formerly Serrinha do Alambari Municipal Park) | Municipal | 6.7 | 2009 | Rio de Janeiro |
| São Francisco Xavier Environmental Protection Area | State | 11,559 | 2002 | São Paulo |
| Sapucaí Mirim Environmental Protection Area | State | 39,800 | 1998 | São Paulo |
| Serra da Mantiqueira Environmental Protection Area | Federal | 434,108 | 1985 | Minas Gerais; Rio de Janeiro; São Paulo |
| Serra do Papagaio State Park | State | 22,917 | 1998 | Minas Gerais |
| Serrinha do Alambari Environmental Protection Area | Municipal | 5,760 | 1991 | Rio de Janeiro |

On 28 December 2010 the Pedra do Baú Natural Monument was created with 3,154 hectares (7,790 acres), a state conservation unit in the municipality of São Bento do Sapucaí.

== Sources ==
- "Corredor ecológico da Serra do Mar", Acervo da Folha do Meio (in Portuguese), FMA: Folha do Meio Ambiente, 20 December 2006, archived from the original on 23 September 2016
- o mosaico mantiqueira (in Portuguese), Mosaico Mantiqueira, archived from the original on 2016-09-27
- Parque Estadual da Pedra Selada (in Portuguese), INEA, archived from the original on 2016-09-15
- Unidades de Conservação - Mosaico Mantiqueira (in Portuguese), ICMBio
