= Rio Pombo Nature Park =

Municipal nature park in Rio de Janeiro, Brazil

- Parque Natural Municipal do Rio Pombo
- Location within Brazil
- Nearest city: Resende, Rio de Janeiro.
- Coordinates: 22°23′14″S 44°33′17″W
- Area: 6.7 hectares (17 acres)
- Designation: Municipal nature park
- Created: 1988

The Rio Pombo Nature Park (Portuguese: Parque Natural Municipal do Rio Pombo), formerly the Serrinha do Alambari Municipal Park, is a municipal nature park in the state of Rio de Janeiro, Brazil.

== Location ==
The Rio Pombo Nature Park is in the municipality of Resende, Rio de Janeiro. It is about 12 kilometres (7.5 mi) from the municipal center. It is about 1 kilometre (0.62 mi) from the eastern border of the Itatiaia National Park. It covers an area of 6.7 hectares (17 acres) of land donated by the municipality. The park is fully contained in the Serrinha do Alambari Environmental Protection Area.

== Environment ==
The predominant vegetation is dense rain forest. The environment is well preserved, with a variety of native trees and many varied bird species. The park is in mountainous country that rises from 700 to 2,300 metres (2,300 to 7,500 ft). The rivers have waterfalls with clear, cold water. The park houses the Camping Clube do Brasil, which is one of its main attractions.

== History ==
The park was originally created as the Serrinha of Alambari Municipal Park (Parque Municipal da Serrinha do Alambari ) by article 172 of municipal law of 1988. The Parque Municipal da Serrinha do Alambari was included in the Mantiqueira Mosaic, created on 11 December 2006. It was renamed the Rio Pombo Nature Park and recategorized by municipal decree 3178 of 30 April 2009 and municipal law 2723 of 8 December 2009. It is managed by the Resende municipal environment agency.

== Sources ==
- Conheça 10 lugares no Rio de Janeiro para viajar no dia dos namorados: Serrinha do Alambari (in Portuguese), Instinto Viajante
- Edison Louroza, Resende (in Portuguese)
- ParPombo (PDF) (in Portuguese), Mosaico Mantiqueira, archived from the original (PDF) on 2016-10-01
- Portaria no- 351, de 11 de Dezembro de 2006 (in Portuguese), MMA
