= Campos do Jordão Environmental Protection Area =

Protected area in São Paulo, Brazil

- Área de Proteção Ambiental Campos do Jordão
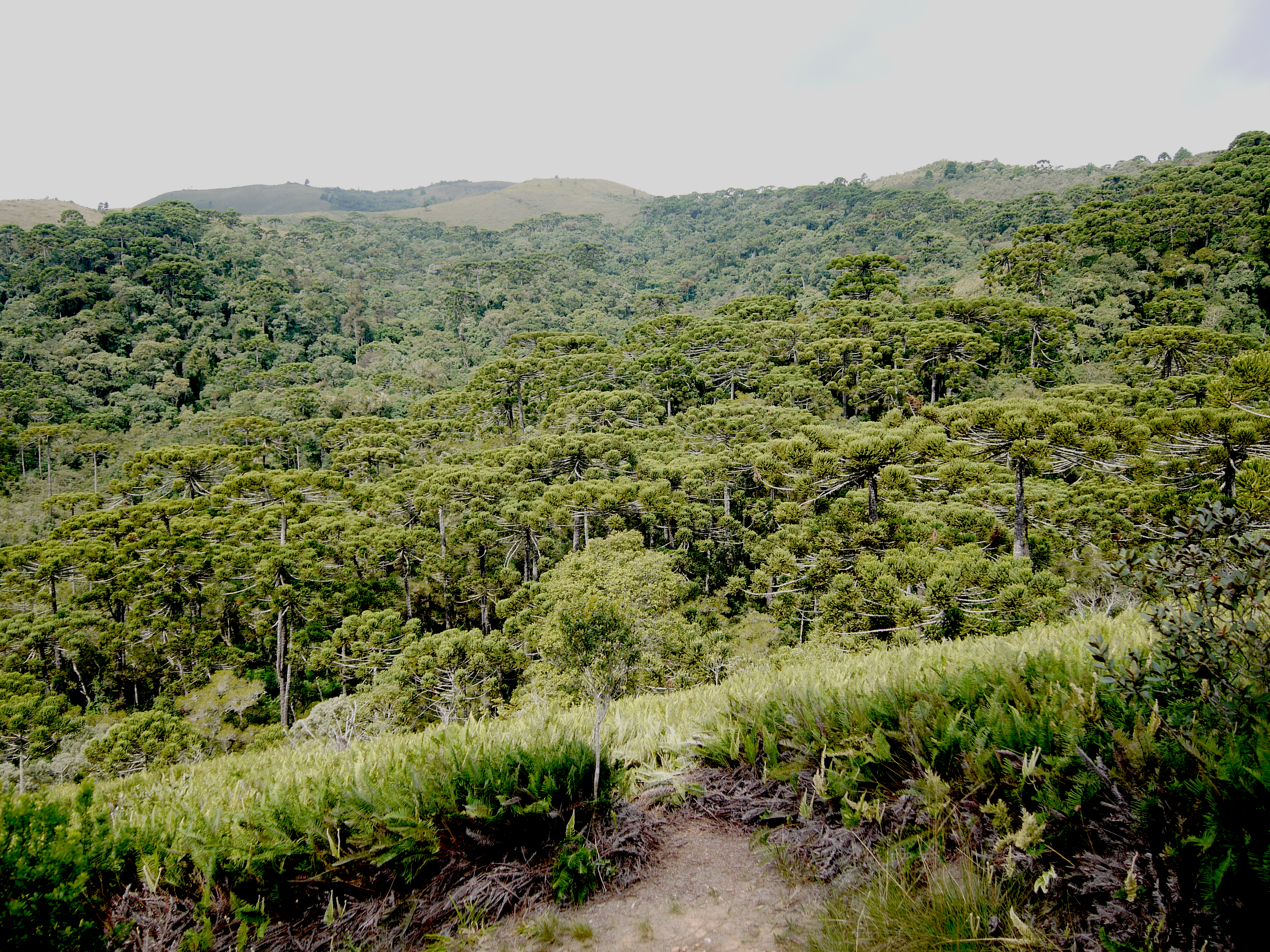

- Location within Brazil
- Nearest city: Campos do Jordão, São Paulo
- Coordinates: 22.7075°S 45.5384°W
- Area: 28,800 hectares (71,000 acres)
- Designation: Environmental protection area
- Created: 26 June 1984
- Administrator: CONSEMA

The Campos do Jordão Environmental Protection Area (Portuguese: Área de Proteção Ambiental Campos do Jordão) is a state-level environmental protection area in the state of São Paulo, Brazil.

== Location ==
The Campos do Jordão Environmental Protection Area (APA) is in the municipality of Campos do Jordão, São Paulo. It has an area of 28,800 hectares (71,000 acres). The APA is located between the two largest urban centers in Brazil, São Paulo and Rio de Janeiro, and has great value for tourism, which is the main economic activity of the region.

== Environment ==
The Campos do Jordão Environmental Protection Area is in the Mantiqueira Mountains. The rugged terrain, vegetation and climate form an environment of great scenic and biological value. The landscape consists of steep slopes with scalloped escarpments, covered in vegetation in the transition between Atlantic Forest and the Araucaria Forest. The Atlantic Forest includes a number of remnants of dense forest. The higher Araucaria Forest includes pines and alpine meadows. Mammals include coati, capuchin monkey, peccary, jaguar, chipmunk, armadillo, brocket deer, opossum, bush dog and oncilla.

== History ==
The Campos do Jordão Environmental Protection Area was created by State Law 4.105 of 26 June 1984. Implementation of the APA was to be coordinated by CONSEMA in collaboration with centralized or decentralized state environment agencies, the executive and legislative branches of the municipality, and the local community. The purpose was to protect important Atlantic Forest ecosystems and water resources used by communities in São Paulo and Minas Gerais. It forms a continuous area with the Sapucaí Mirim Environmental Protection Area. The APA is part of the Mantiqueira Mosaic of conservation units.

== Sources ==
- APA Sapucaí-Mirim (in Portuguese), ISA: Instituto Socioambiental
- Área de Proteção Ambiental Campos do Jordão (in Portuguese), Fundação Florestal SP, archived from the original on 2016-10-02
- Campos do Jordão (APA) (in Portuguese), ISA: Instituto Socioambiental
- o mosaico mantiqueira (in Portuguese), Mosaico Mantiqueira, archived from the original on 2016-09-27
- Sobre a APA (in Portuguese), Fundação Florestal SP
