= São Francisco Xavier Environmental Protection Area =

- Área de Proteção Ambiental São Francisco Xavier
- Location within Brazil
- Nearest city: São José dos Campos, São Paulo
- Coordinates: 22°53′15″S 45°56′04″W
- Area: 11,559 hectares (28,560 acres)
- Designation: Environmental protection area
- Created: 8 November 2002
- Administrator: Secretaria do Meio Ambiente do Estado de São Paulo

The São Francisco Xavier Environmental Protection Area (Portuguese: Área de Proteção Ambiental São Francisco Xavier) is an environmental protection area in the state of São Paulo, Brazil.

== Location ==
The São Francisco Xavier Environmental Protection Area (APA) is in the municipality of São José dos Campos, São Paulo. The municipality is a key destination for regional tourism, with its waterfalls characteristic of the Mantiqueira Mountains ecosystems. The APA has an area of 11,559 hectares (28,560 acres).

The area holds one of the few remnants of broad leaf rainforest in the state. The Serra dos Poncianos feeds the watersheds of the Peixe and Fartura rivers, the largest sources for the Jaguari Dam. The climate is tropical montane, with an average temperature of 17.5 °C (63.5 °F). There are several waterfalls, and trails for hiking and mountain biking. Ecotourism while preserving biodiversity is seen as the most promising local economic activity.

== History ==
The São Francisco Xavier Environmental Protection Area was created by SP state law 11.262 of 8 November 2002, and is regulated by law SMS 64/2008, which instituted its management plan. It is mainly concerned with protecting water resources and the southern muriqui, a primate. It is managed by the Fundação Florestal of SP, with support from the prefecture of São José dos Campos. It is part of the Mantiqueira Mosaic of conservation units, established in 2006.

== Sources ==
- APA São Francisco Xavier (in Portuguese), ISA: Instituto Socioambiental
- Área de Proteção Ambiental São Francisco Xavier (in Portuguese), SAP: Sistema Ambiental Paulista
- o mosaico mantiqueira (in Portuguese), Mosaico Mantiqueira
