= Santo Antônio do Pinhal =

- Municipality
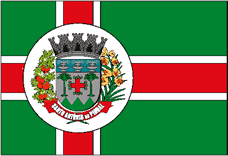
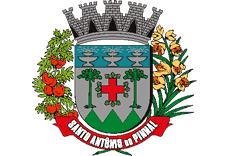
- Flag Coat of arms

- Location in São Paulo state

- Location in Brazil
- Coordinates: 22°49′38″S 45°39′45″W
- Country: Brazil
- Region: Southeast Brazil
- State: São Paulo
- Metropolitan Region: Vale do Paraíba e Litoral Norte

Area
  - Total: 133.01 km^{2} (51.36 sq mi)
- Elevation: 1,080 m (3,540 ft)

Population (2020)
  - Total: 6,827
  - Density: 51.33/km^{2} (132.9/sq mi)
- Time zone: UTC−3 (BRT)

Santo Antônio do Pinhal is a municipality in the state of São Paulo in Brazil. It is part of the Metropolitan Region of Vale do Paraíba e Litoral Norte. The population is 6,827 (2020 est.) in an area of 133.01 km^{2} (51.36 sq mi). The elevation is 1,080 m (3543 ft). It is situated near Campos do Jordão, some 150 km away from São Paulo.

The municipality contains 34% of the 39,800-hectare (98,000-acre) Sapucaí Mirim Environmental Protection Area, created in 1998.

== Media ==
In telecommunications, the city was served by Companhia de Telecomunicações do Estado de São Paulo until 1975, when it began to be served by Telecomunicações de São Paulo. In July 1998, this company was acquired by Telefónica, which adopted the Vivo brand in 2012.

The company is currently an operator of cell phones, fixed lines, internet (fiber optics/4G) and television (satellite and cable).

== See also ==
- List of municipalities in São Paulo
