= Passa Quatro National Forest =

National forest in Brazil

- Floresta Nacional de Passa Quatro
- IUCN category VI (protected area with sustainable use of natural resources)
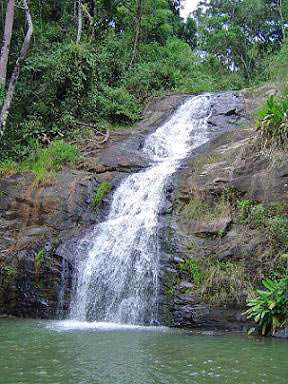
- Iporã Waterfall - the main attraction

- Location within Brazil
- Nearest city: Passa Quatro, Minas Gerais
- Coordinates: 22°23′21″S 44°56′49″W
- Area: 335.37 hectares (828.7 acres)
- Designation: National forest
- Created: 25 October 1968

The Passa Quatro National Forest (Portuguese: Floresta Nacional de Passa Quatro) is a national forest in the state of Minas Gerais, Brazil. It contains an area of Atlantic Forest.

== Location ==
The Passa Quatro National Forest is in the municipality of Passa Quatro, Minas Gerais. It has an area of 335.37 hectares (828.7 acres). The forest contains important remnants of Atlantic Forest as well as moncultures of Araucaria angustifolia, Pinus species and Eucaliptus species. Protected species in the forest include maned wolf (Chrysocyon brachyurus), ocelot (Leopardus pardalis) and cougar (Puma concolor).

The forest provides a location for outdoor recreation and for educational activities focused on environmental awareness, conservation of water resources and biological diversity. The Iporã waterfall is the main attraction, where visitors may bathe. There is an extensive green area for picnics or relaxation, with two ornamental lakes, squares, gardens, gazebo, a playground and a drinking water fountain. The forest also has a plant nursery.

== History ==
The Passa Quatro National Forest was created by federal ordnance 562 of 25 October 1968. At first it was administered by the former Instituto Nacional do Pinho (INP). It is now run by the Chico Mendes Institute for Biodiversity Conservation. It is classed as IUCN protected area category VI (protected area with sustainable use of natural resources). Its purpose is sustainable multiple use of forest resources, and scientific research with emphasis on methods for sustainable exploitation of native forests. It is part of the Mantiqueira Mosaic of conservation units, created in 2006. It is also part of the Serra da Mantiqueira Ecological Corridor.

== Sources ==
- Flona de Passa Quatro (in Portuguese), ICMBio, archived from the original on 2019-08-07
- Floresta Nacional de Passa Quatro (in Portuguese), ICMBio, archived from the original on 2019-08-07
- o mosaico mantiqueira (in Portuguese), Mosaico Mantiqueira, archived from the original on 2016-09-27
- Unidade de Conservação: Floresta Nacional de Passa Quatro (in Portuguese), MMA: Ministério do Meio Ambiente
