= Lorena National Forest =

Fragment of Atlantic Forest in São Paulo, Brazil

- Floresta Nacional de Lorena
- IUCN category VI (protected area with sustainable use of natural resources)
- Location within Brazil
- Nearest city: Lorena, São Paulo
- Coordinates: 22°43′10″S 45°05′45″W
- Area: 281.41 hectares (695.4 acres)
- Designation: National forest
- Created: 10 April 1934
- Administrator: Chico Mendes Institute for Biodiversity Conservation

The Lorena National Forest (Portuguese: Floresta Nacional de Lorena) is a national forest in the state of São Paulo, Brazil. It protects a relatively small fragment of Atlantic Forest.

== Location ==
The Lorena National Forest is in the municipality of Lorena, São Paulo. It has an area of 281.41 hectares (695.4 acres). The forest has the largest and most diverse area of Atlantic Forest in the great plain known as the Paraíba Valley. It is an important source of seeds to maintain genetic diversity of tree species. The forest is surrounded in part by the town of Lorena, and by areas of cattle pasturage and rice fields. The forest is used by school students and by residents of the town as a traditional recreation area. There are about 2,000 visitors annually.

== History ==
The Estação Florestal Experimental Dr. Epitácio Santiago (Dr. Epitácio Santiago Experimental Forest Station) was created by decree 24.104 of 10 April 1934. Law 6.209 of 28 May 1975 changed the category of the conservation unit. Ordnance 246 of 18 July 2001 renamed the conservation unit to the Lorena National Forest, with an area of 249 hectares (620 acres) in the municipality of Lorena.

The purpose is to promote the proper management of natural resources to ensure protection of water resources, scenic beauty and historical and archaeological sites, to encourage development of basic and applied scientific research, and to support environmental education, recreational activities, leisure and tourism. The forest is classed as IUCN protected area category VI (protected area with sustainable use of natural resources).

The Brazilian Institute of Environment and Renewable Natural Resources (IBAMA) created the consultative council on 30 August 2005. The forest became part of the Mantiqueira Mosaic of conservation units, created in 2006. On 5 August 2008 IBAMA and the Chico Mendes Institute for Biodiversity Conservation (ICMBio) launched an inquiry into irregularities in extraction of wood, sand mining, disappearance of wild animals and sale of seedlings. The forest is now administered by ICMBio. The management plan was approved on 10 May 2016.

== Sources ==
- Flona de Lorena (in Portuguese), ICMBio: Chico Mendes Institute for Biodiversity Conservation
- FLONA de Lorena (in Portuguese), ISA: Instituto Socioambiental
- o mosaico mantiqueira (in Portuguese), Mosaico Mantiqueira
- Unidade de Conservação: Floresta Nacional de Lorena (in Portuguese), MMA: Ministério do Meio Ambiente
