= Toldi Falls =

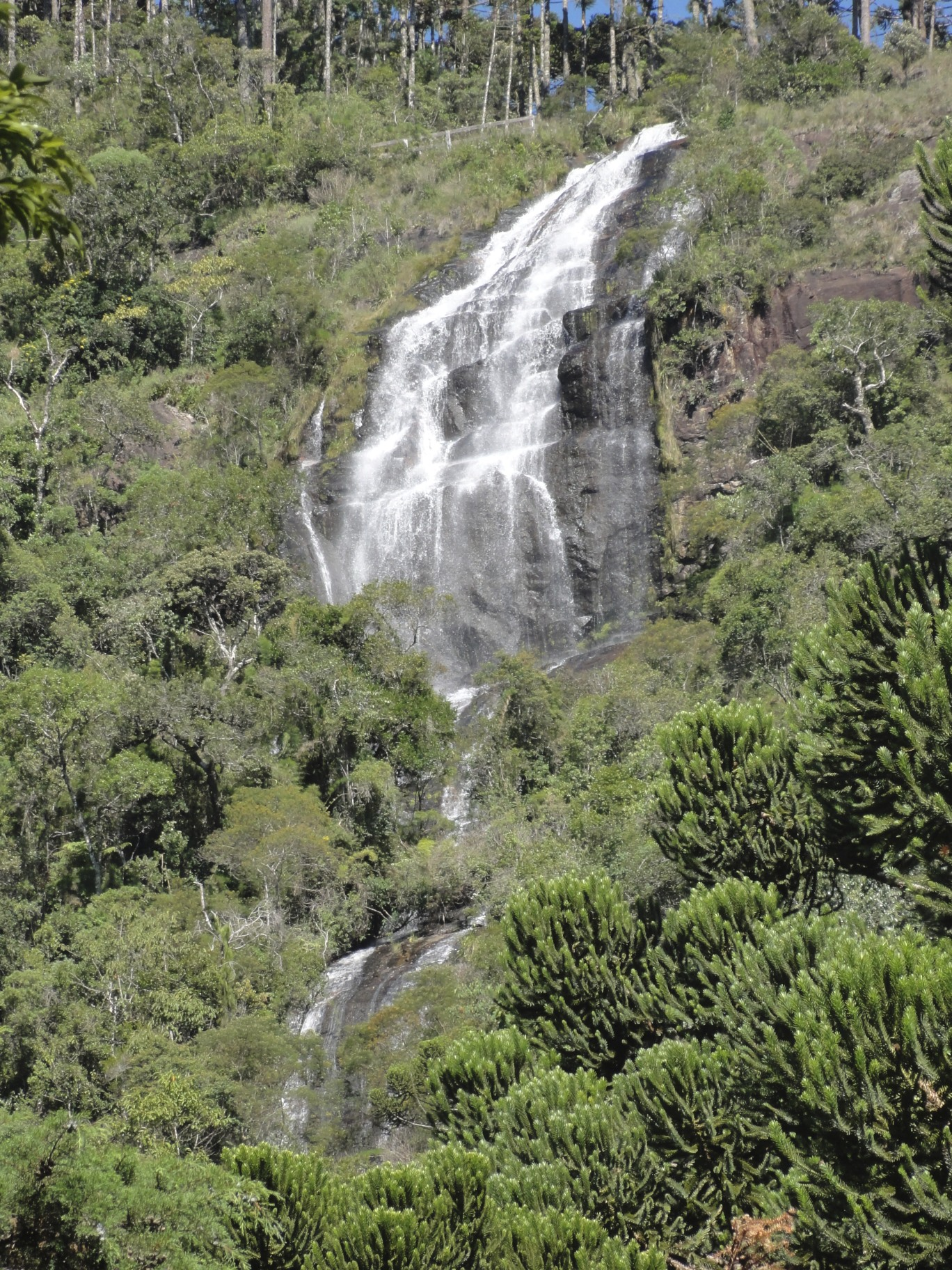
- Toldi Falls

- Location within Brazil
- Location: São Bento do Sapucaí, São Paulo, Brazil
- Coordinates: 22°39′33″S 45°38′40″W
- Type: cascade
- Longest drop: 70 metres (230 ft)

Toldi Falls (Portuguese: Cachoeira do Toldi) is a waterfall located in the municipality of São Bento do Sapucaí, São Paulo, Brazil.
