= Passa Quatro =

- Municipality
- Municipality of Passa Quatro
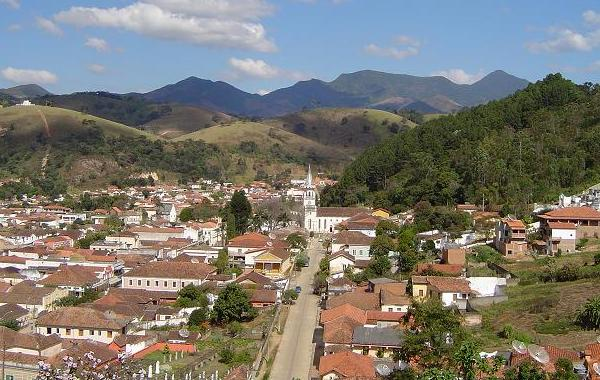
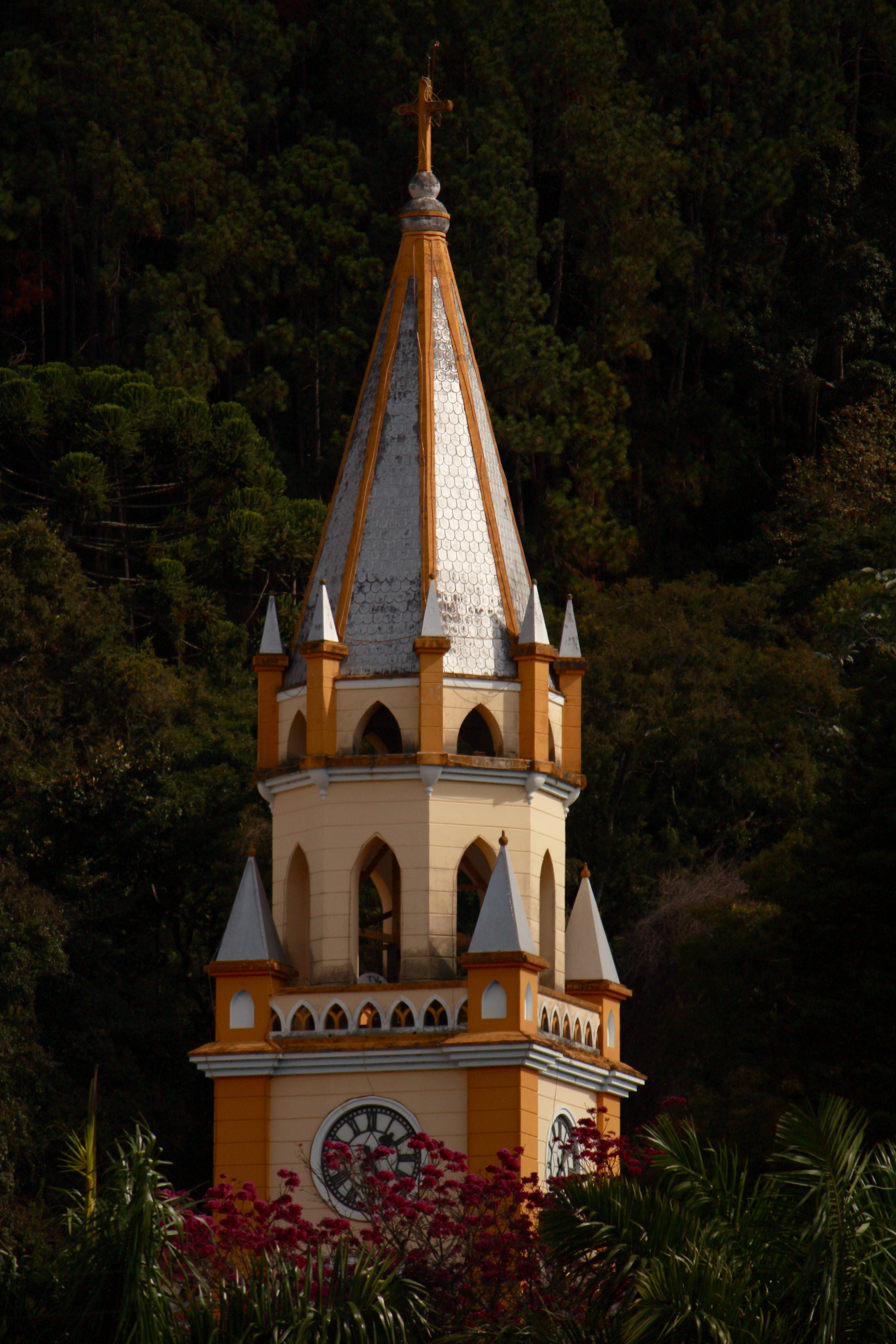
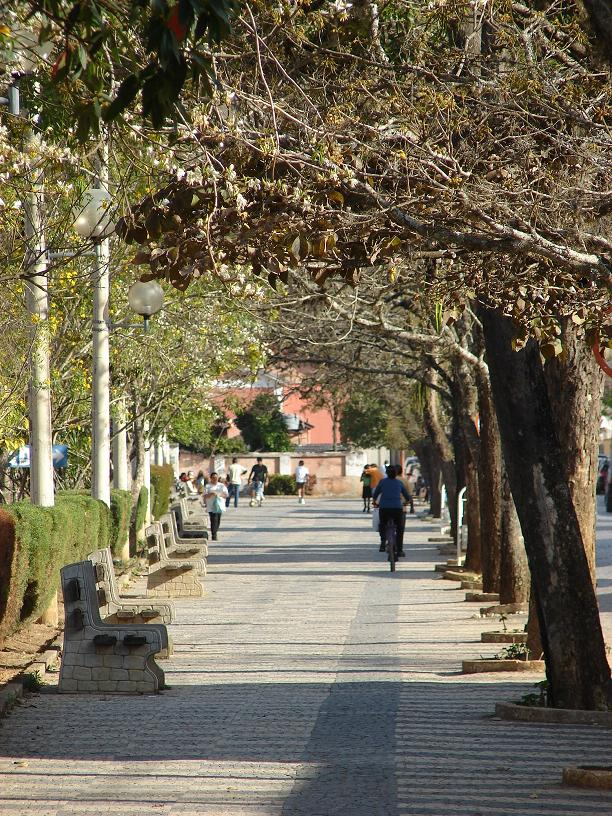
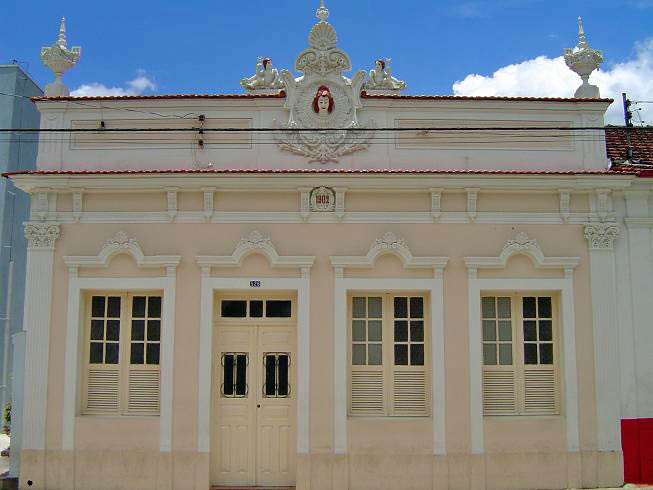
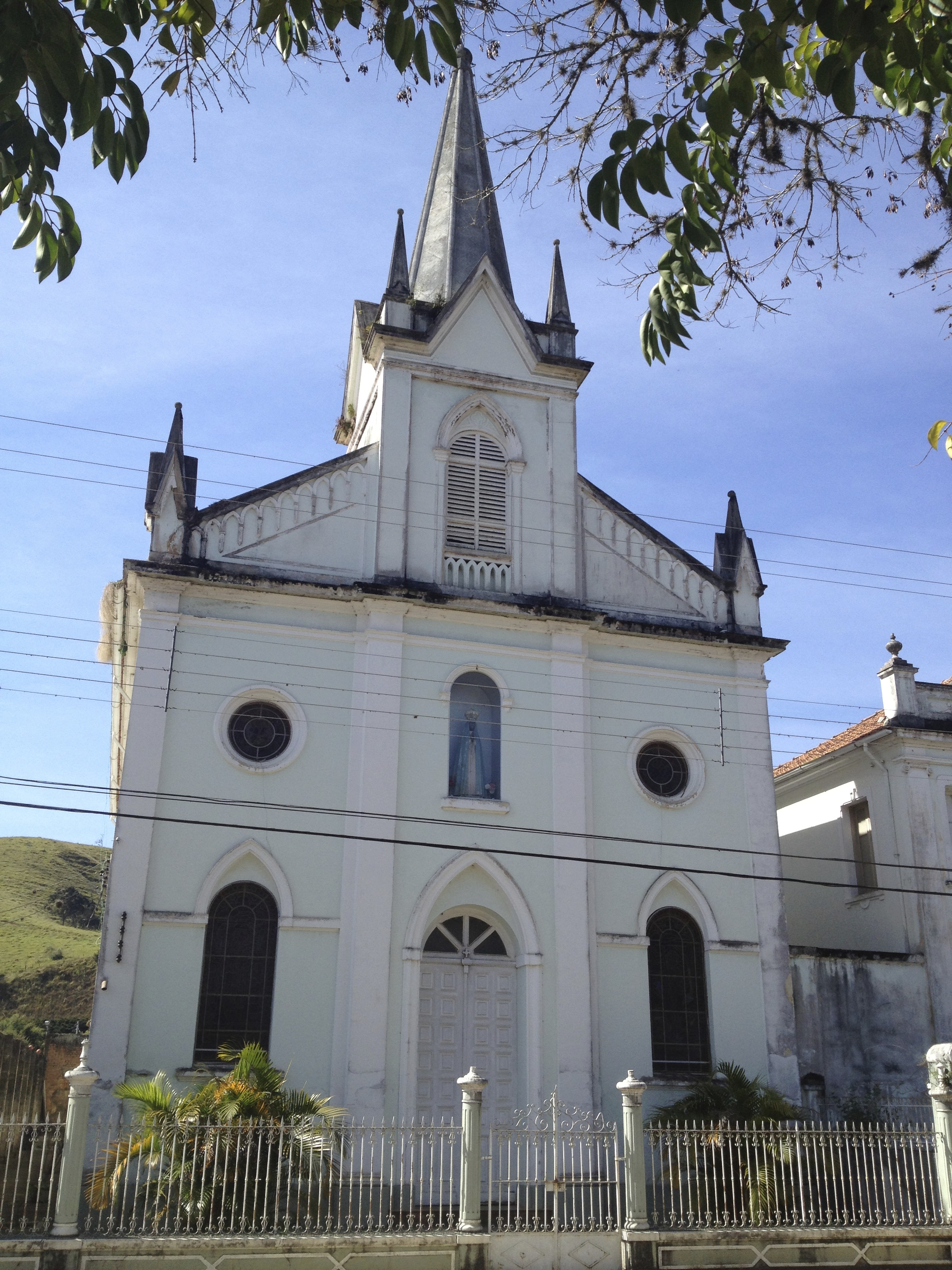
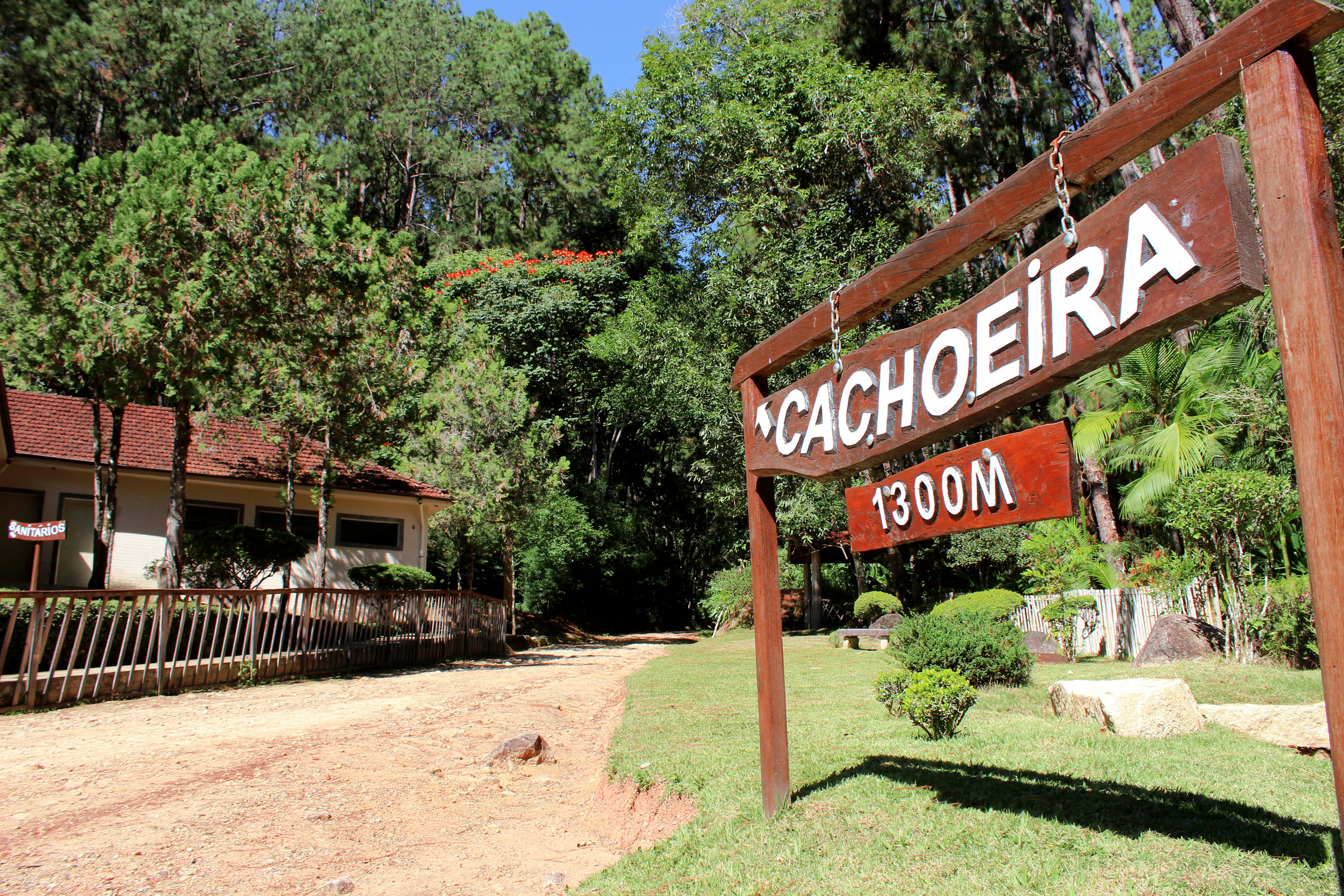

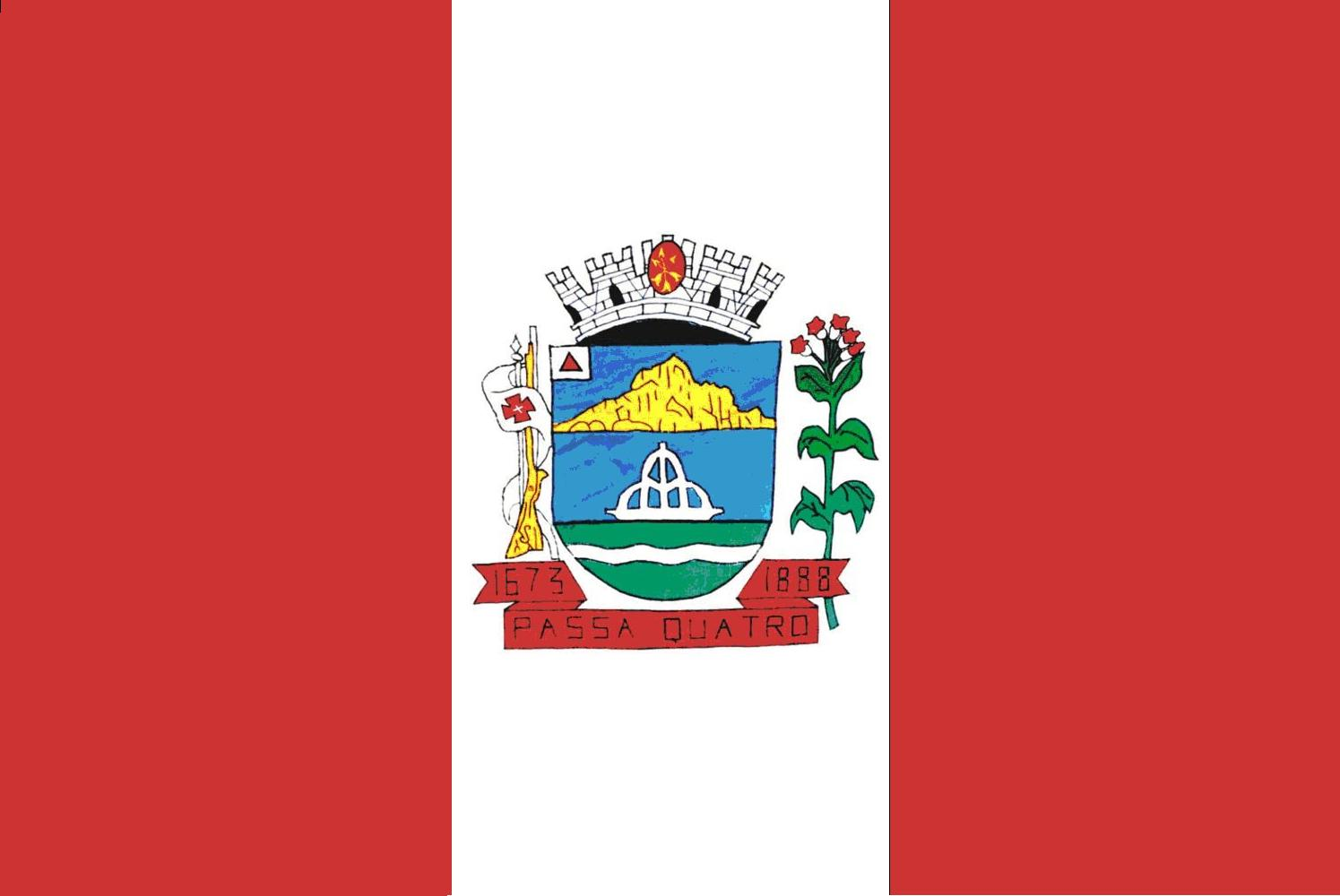
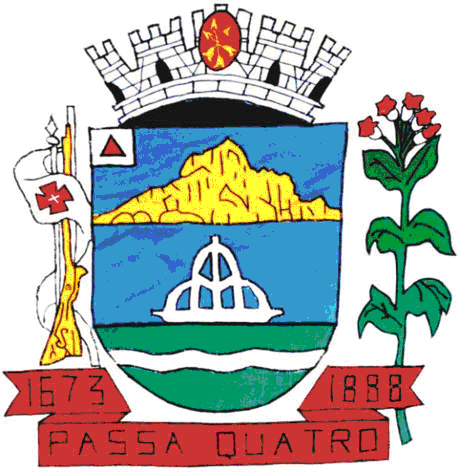
- Flag Coat of arms

- Location in Minas Gerais

- Location in Brazil
- Coordinates: 22°23′24″S 44°58′1″W
- Country: Brazil
- Region: Southeast
- State: Minas Gerais

Area
  - Total: 277.22 km^{2} (107.04 sq mi)

Population (2020)
  - Total: 16,393
  - Density: 59.134/km^{2} (153.16/sq mi)
- Time zone: UTC−3 (BRT)
- HDI (2010): 0.715 – high

Passa-Quatro is a municipality in the state of Minas Gerais in Brazil. The population is 16,393 (2020 est.) in an area of 277.22 km^{2}. It is part of the microregion of São Lourenço.

== History ==
The origin of the name comes from the explorations of the bandeirante Fernão Dias Paes Leme who was given instructions to pass over a river four times, thus "Passa Quatro". The first inhabitants settled the region in 1674. The region wasn't populated until the second half of the 19th century when it became a district in 1854. In 1884, the Minas-Rio railway was constructed by the English and spurred its development. Emperor Dom Pedro II elevated the town to a city in 1888.

== Geography ==
Mountains include the fourth tallest peak in Brazil, the Pedra da Mina (2,798 m) located within Serra Fina and the point of Serra da Mantiqueira where the boundary of São Paulo is located. The Pico dos Três Estados is another landmark located on the boundaries of São Paulo, Minas Gerais and Rio de Janeiro. There are dozens of other peaks over 2,000 m.

The city was declared a hydro-mineral spa in 1941 due to its various fountains of torio-radioactive waters, which are reputedly sought out for curing liver and kidney problems. The winter is dry and the summer mild with temperatures varying between 16 and 22 degrees Celsius. In winter they can drop to 0 degrees with strong frost. This rural area has views of four of the ten highest peaks in the country. Trout fishing is possible all year. A tourist train service (narrow gauge) was inaugurated in the beginning of 2004 between the cities of Passa Quatro and Manacá.

The municipality contains the 335-hectare (830-acre) Passa Quatro National Forest, created in 1968. The forest is controlled by IBAMA and has native forest, exotic species, lakes, and the Iporã waterfall.

=== New Climber Point ===
Passa Quatro has a newer point of climber at Brazil, compared to Siurana: Gruta de Passa Quatro (Cave of Four Passes). There are a big negative and the local climbers are working to open the roads in this place. (The climbing point is in Passa Vinte, not in Passa Quarto)

=== Climate ===
Climate data for Passa Quatro (1981–2010)
Month	Jan	Feb	Mar	Apr	May	Jun	Jul	Aug	Sep	Oct	Nov	Dec	Year
Mean daily maximum °C (°F)	27.8 (82.0)	28.9 (84.0)	28.1 (82.6)	26.8 (80.2)	24.2 (75.6)	23.7 (74.7)	23.7 (74.7)	25.2 (77.4)	25.9 (78.6)	26.6 (79.9)	27.2 (81.0)	27.5 (81.5)	26.3 (79.3)
Daily mean °C (°F)	22.0 (71.6)	22.1 (71.8)	21.5 (70.7)	19.7 (67.5)	16.5 (61.7)	14.7 (58.5)	14.5 (58.1)	15.9 (60.6)	18.2 (64.8)	20.0 (68.0)	20.9 (69.6)	21.5 (70.7)	19.0 (66.2)
Mean daily minimum °C (°F)	17.6 (63.7)	17.2 (63.0)	16.7 (62.1)	14.3 (57.7)	10.7 (51.3)	8.4 (47.1)	7.9 (46.2)	8.7 (47.7)	12.0 (53.6)	14.7 (58.5)	15.9 (60.6)	17.0 (62.6)	13.4 (56.1)
Average precipitation mm (inches)	299.7 (11.80)	194.1 (7.64)	163.1 (6.42)	65.5 (2.58)	60.2 (2.37)	35.1 (1.38)	29.9 (1.18)	17.2 (0.68)	83.4 (3.28)	151.8 (5.98)	173.4 (6.83)	284.9 (11.22)	1,558.3 (61.35)
Average precipitation days (≥ 1.0 mm)	18	14	13	6	5	4	3	2	7	11	13	17	113
Average relative humidity (%)	77.7	75.9	76.8	75.4	76.5	77.0	74.8	69.4	69.6	72.7	74.1	76.8	74.7
Source: Instituto Nacional de Meteorologia

== See also ==
- List of municipalities in Minas Gerais
