= Lorena, São Paulo =

Lorena
- Municipality
- Municipality of Lorena
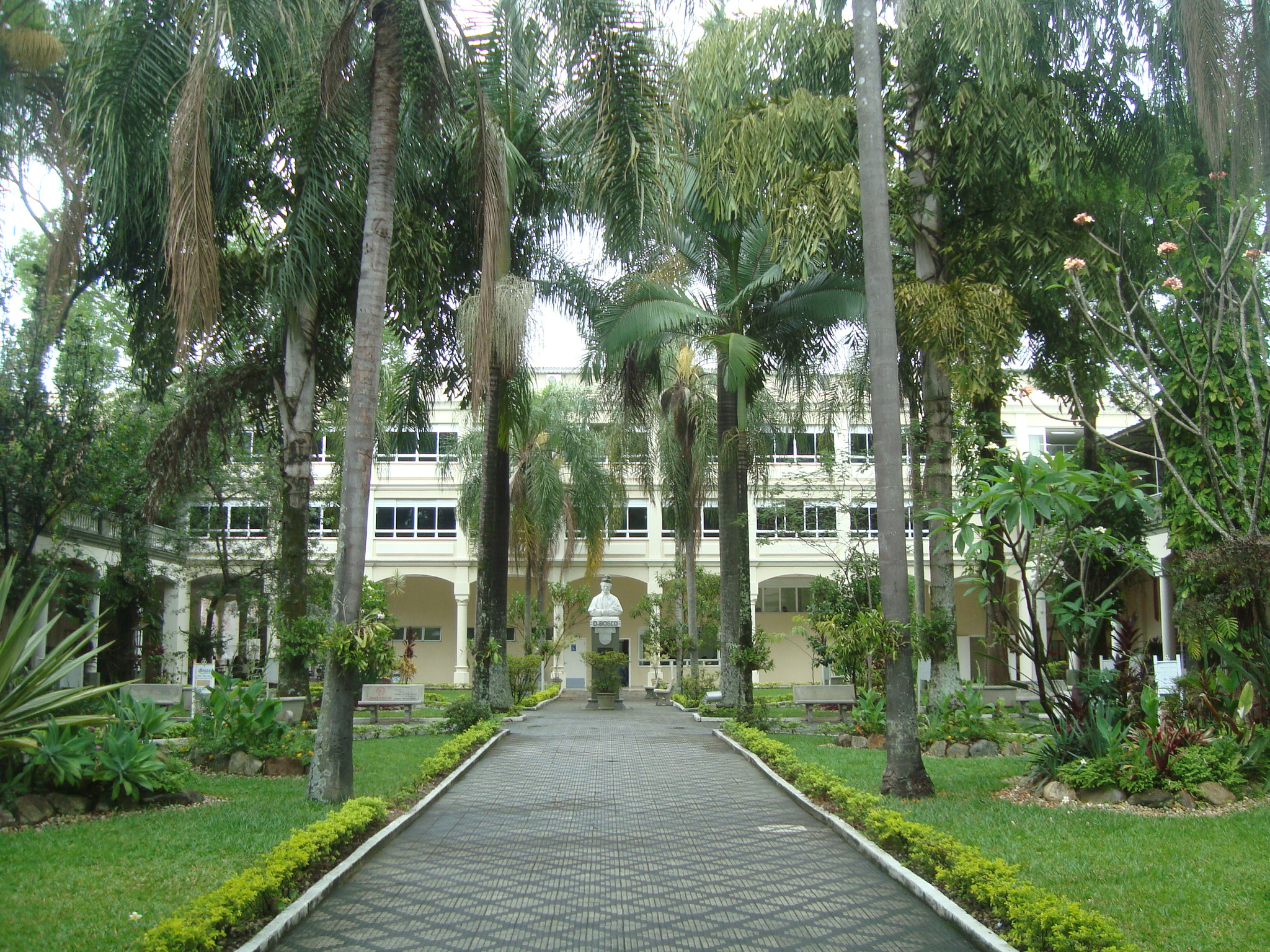
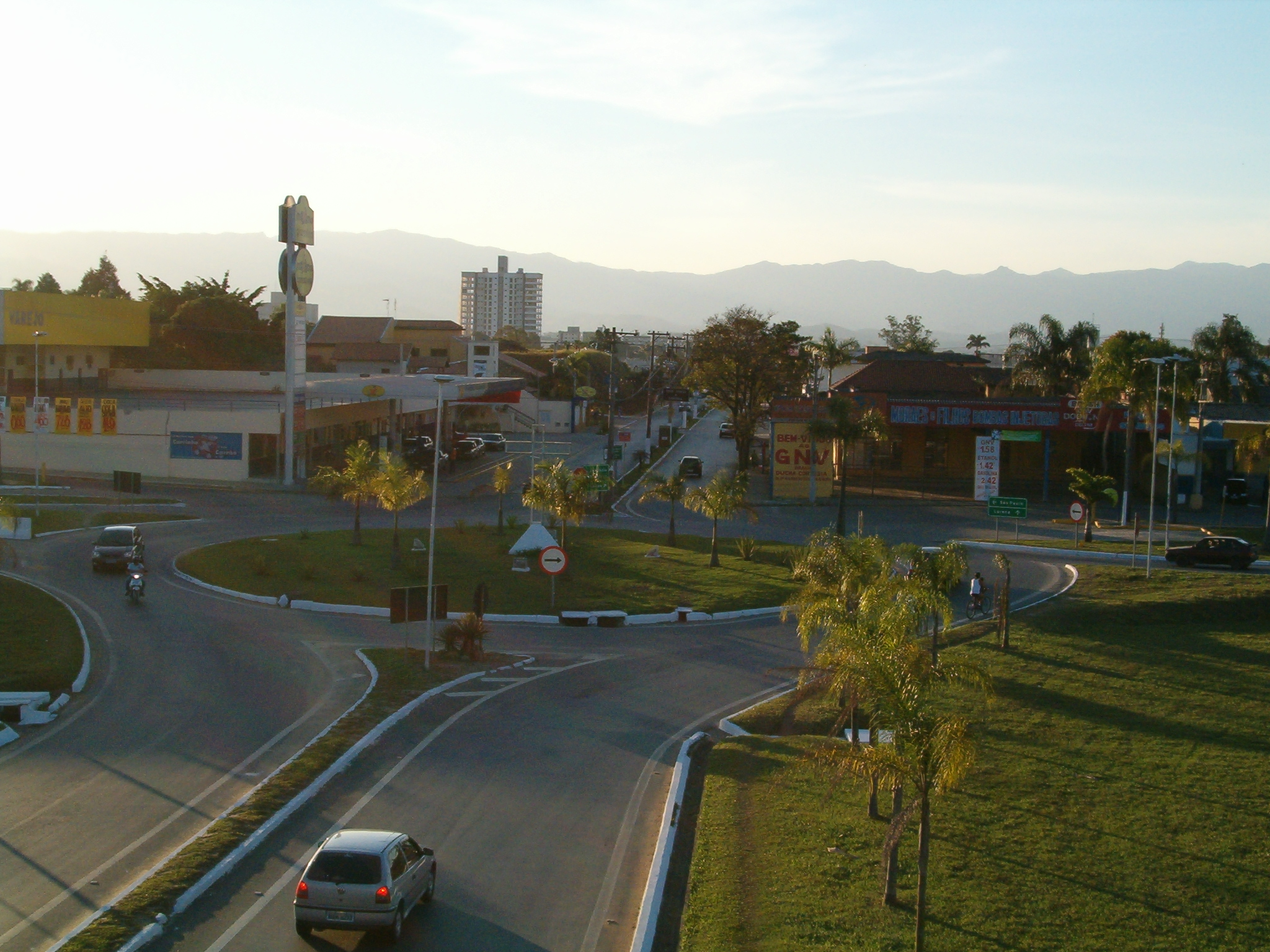
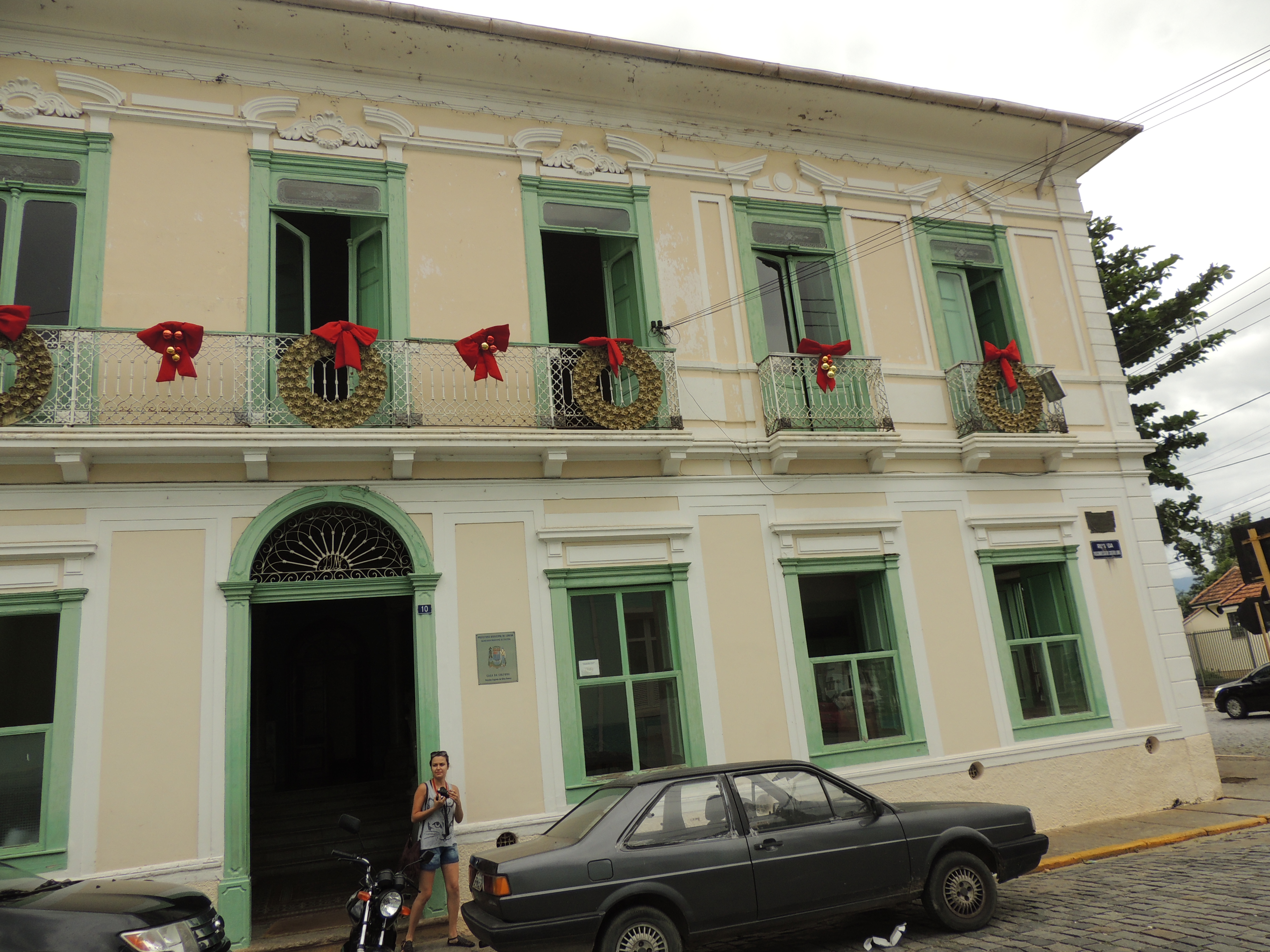
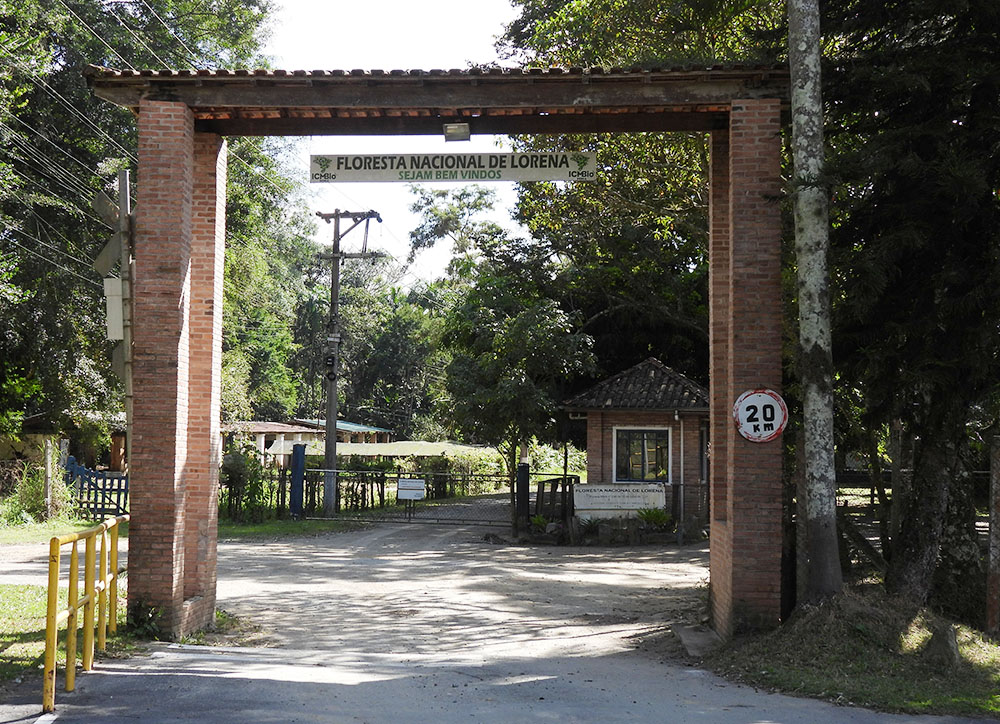
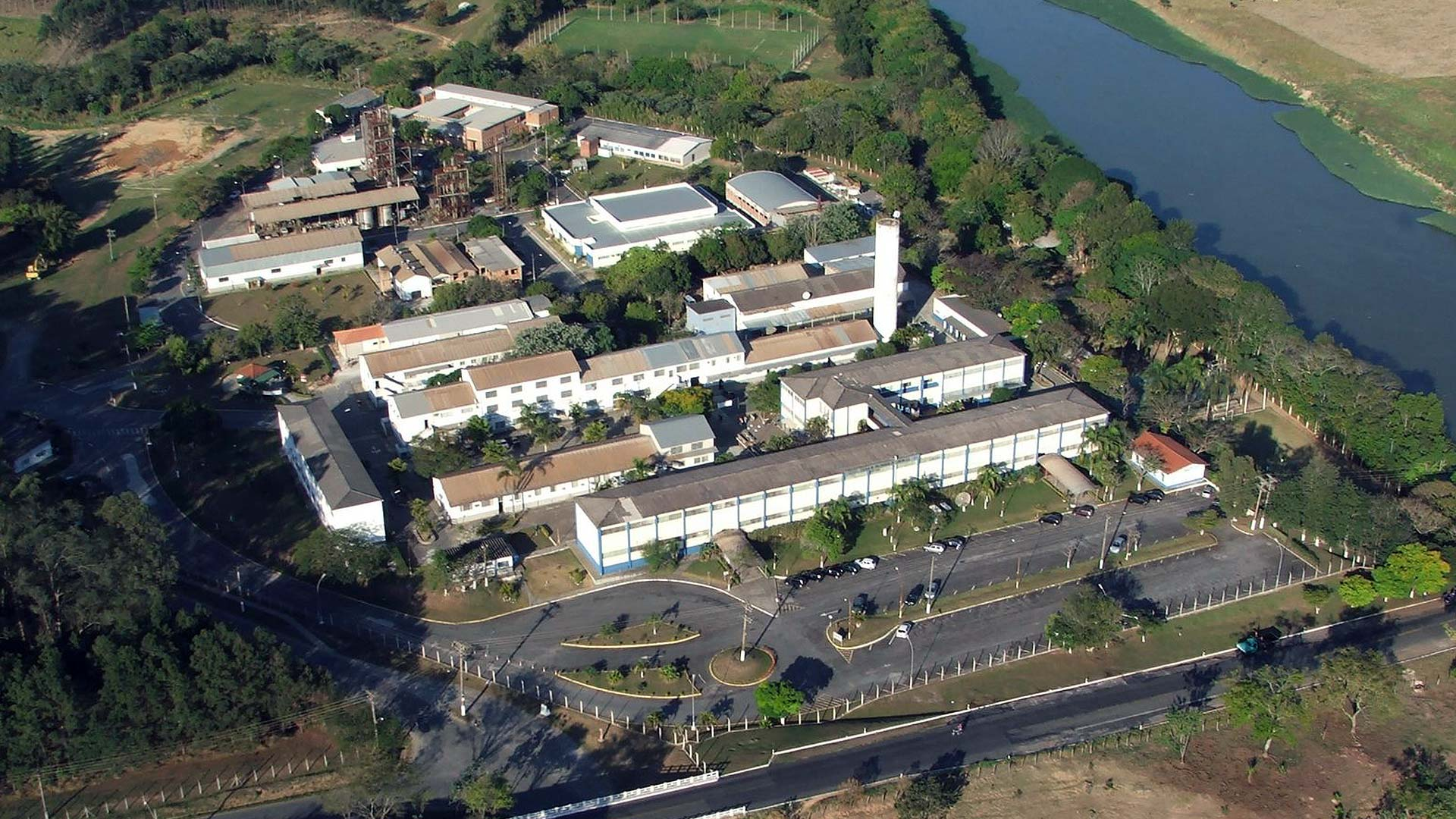

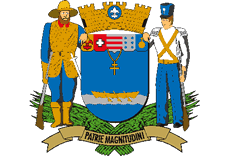
- Flag Coat of arms

- Location in São Paulo

- Location within Brazil
- Coordinates: 22°43′51″S 45°07′29″W
- Country: Brazil
- Region: Southeast Brazil
- State: São Paulo
- Metropolitan Region: Vale do Paraíba e Litoral Norte
- Founded: 1788

Area
  - Total: 414.16 km^{2} (159.91 sq mi)
- Elevation: 524 m (1,719 ft)

Population (2020)
  - Total: 89,125
  - Density: 215.19/km^{2} (557.35/sq mi)
- Time zone: UTC−3 (BRT)
- Postal code: 12600-000 to 12614-999
- Area code: +55 12
- HDI (2010): 0.766 – high
- Website: www.lorena.sp.gov.br

Lorena is a municipality in the state of São Paulo in Brazil.

== General ==
Lorena is part of the Metropolitan Region of Vale do Paraíba e Litoral Norte. The population is 89,125 (2020 est.) in an area of 414.16 km^{2}. The elevation is 524 m, after the political emancipation of Canas, its last district.

The city was originated when a farm was constructed at the end of the 17th century. It became a parish in 1718, a municipality in 1788 and is a city since 1856. The city is now the seat of the Roman Catholic Diocese of Lorena. Its main business areas are industry, services and agro-business. It is also a highlight in region due to its three colleges, including areas from human to exact sciences. People of things who come from or inhabit in Lorena are called "lorenense".

The municipality contains the 281 hectares (690 acres) Lorena National Forest, created in 1934.

== Demography ==
Historical population (municipality)
Year	Population	%±
1920	15,645
1940	15,961	2.0%
1950	24,569	53.9%
1960	33,254	35.3%
1970	46,463	39.7%
1980	57,369	23.5%
1991	73,146	27.5%
2000	77,990	6.6%
2010	82,537	5.8%
2022	84,855	2.8%

=== Demographics ===
According to the 2010 IBGE Census, the population was 82,553, of which 80,182 are urban and 2,371 are rural. The average life expectancy for the municipality was 70.64 years. The literacy rate was at 94.13%.

== Media ==
In telecommunications, the city was served by Companhia Telefônica Brasileira until 1973, when it began to be served by Telecomunicações de São Paulo. In July 1998, this company was acquired by Telefónica, which adopted the Vivo brand in 2012.

The company is currently an operator of cell phones, fixed lines, internet (fiber optics/4G) and television (satellite and cable).

== See also ==
- List of municipalities in São Paulo
