= Sapucaí Mirim Environmental Protection Area =

Conservation area in São Paulo, Brazil

- Área de Proteção Ambiental Sapucaí-Mirim
- IUCN category V (protected landscape/seascape)
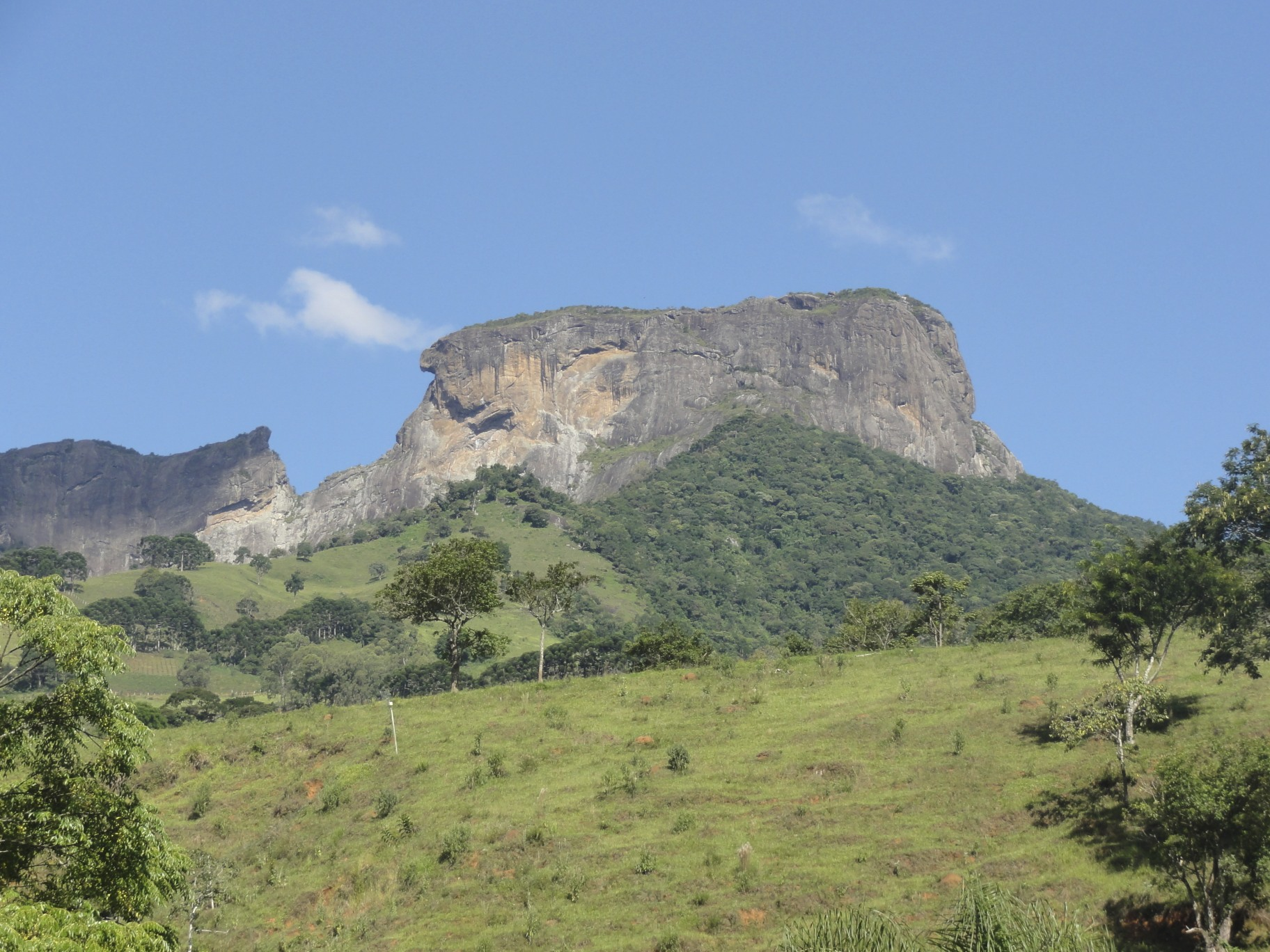
- The Bauzinho and Pedra do Baú formations

- Location within Brazil
- Nearest city: São Bento do Sapucaí, São Paulo.
- Coordinates: 22°41′09″S 45°41′52″W
- Area: 39,800 hectares (98,000 acres)
- Designation: Environmental protection area
- Created: 3 July 1998
- Administrator: Secretaria do Meio Ambiente do Estado de São Paulo

The Sapucaí Mirim Environmental Protection Area (Portuguese: Área de Proteção Ambiental Sapucaí-Mirim) is an environmental protection area in the state of São Paulo, Brazil.

== Location ==
The Sapucaí Mirim Environmental Protection Area is divided between the municipalities of Santo Antônio do Pinhal (34.26%) and São Bento do Sapucaí (65.74%) in the state of São Paulo. It has an area of 39,800 hectares (98,000 acres). The APA protects part of the Mantiqueira Mountains, an imposing range covered by dense forest in the transition from Atlantic Forest to higher Araucaria forest. It protects the remnants of native vegetation of the region, the associated fauna and the headwaters of the Sapucaí River, which supplies water to 40 municipalities in Minas Gerais.

== History ==
The Sapucaí Mirim Environmental Protection Area was created by state decree 43.285 of 3 July 1998 to protect the portion of the Sapucaí-Mirim River in São Paulo. It forms a continuous area with the Campos do Jordão Environmental Protection Area. The APA was created under an agreement between the governments of São Paulo and Minas Gerais to share environmental management in the border region between the two states. The same agreement covered creation of the Fernão Dias Environmental Protection Area in the headwaters of the Cantareira System reservoirs in Minas Gerais. The APA is part of the Mantiqueira Mosaic of conservation units, created in 2006.

== Sources ==
- APA Sapucaí-Mirim (in Portuguese), ISA: Instituto Socioambiental
- Área de Proteção Ambiental Sapucaí-Mirim (in Portuguese), SAP: Sistema Ambiental Paulista
- Mário Covas (3 July 1998), Decreto Estadual nº 43.285, de 3 de Julho de 1998 - São Paulo (PDF) (in Portuguese)
- o mosaico mantiqueira (in Portuguese), Mosaico Mantiqueira, archived from the original on 2016-09-27
