= Pedra do Baú =

Rock formation in Brazil

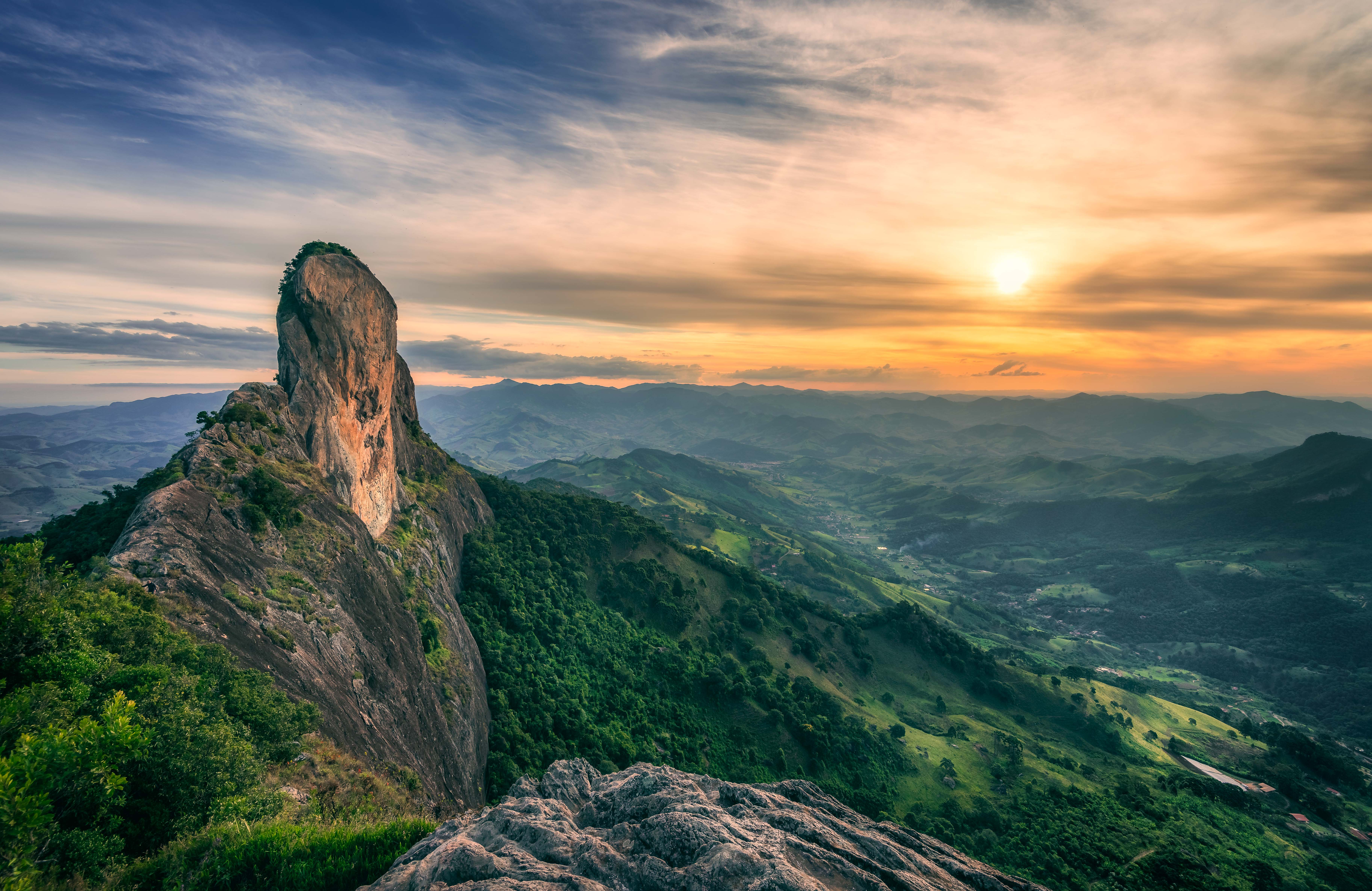
- Pedra do Baú Natural Monument seen from Pedra do Bauzinho.

Highest point
- Elevation: 1,950 m (6,400 ft)
- Prominence: 300 m (980 ft)
- Coordinates: 22°41′20″S 45°39′41″W

Geography
- Location within Brazil
- Location: São Bento do Sapucaí, São Paulo, Brazil
- Parent range: Mantiqueira Mountains

Climbing
- First ascent: 1940

Pedra do Baú and the Pedra do Baú complex are rock formations in the Mantiqueira Mountains (Serra da Mantiqueira). They are located in the municipality of São Bento do Sapucaí, São Paulo, Brazil.

== Geography ==
The gneiss rock complex comprises three distinct "rock formation landmarks": Pedra do Baú, Bauzinho, and Ana Chata.

At its highest point, the elevation is 1,950 metres (6,400 ft).

On 28 December 2010 the Pedra do Baú Natural Monument was created with 3,154 hectares (7,790 acres), a state-level natural monument that is part of the Mantiqueira Mosaic of conservation units.

== Rock climbing ==
There are over 200 rock climbing routes in the complex, ranging from 15m to 400m in height.

== Ecotourism ==
The formation is a popular site for rock climbing, paragliding, and other forms of ecotourism.

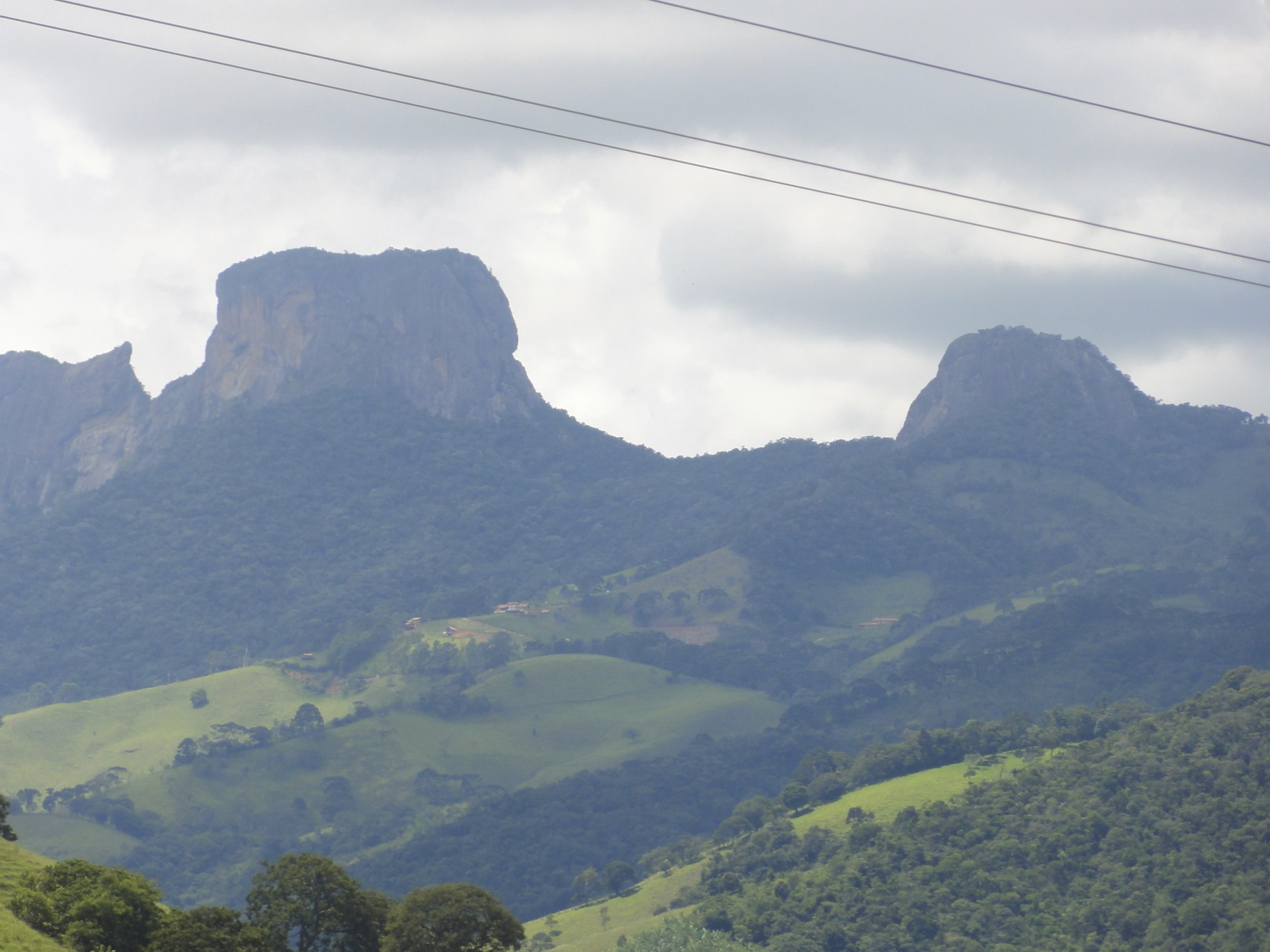
Left to Right: Bauzinho, Pedra do Baú, Ana Chata

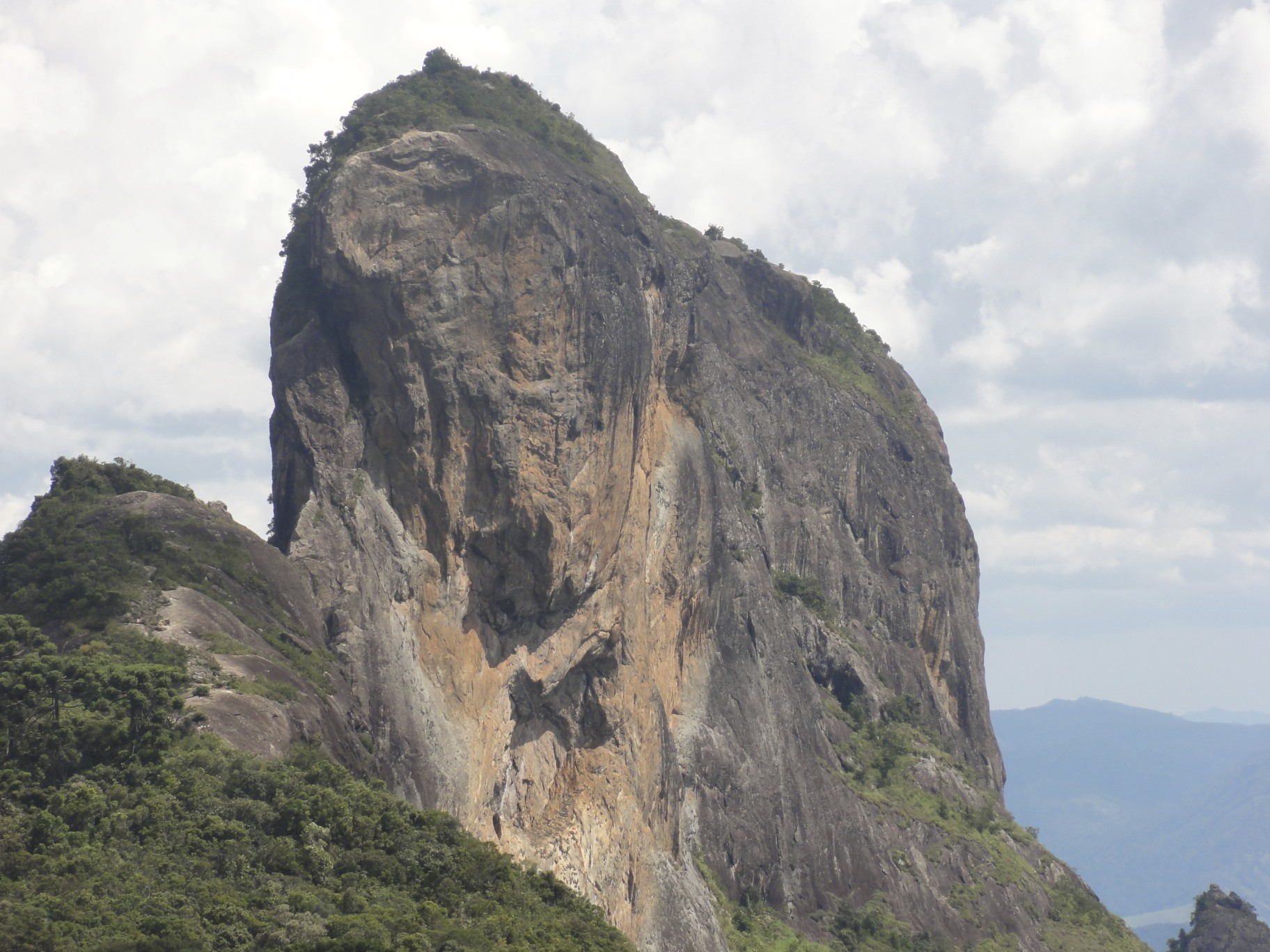
Pedra do Baú

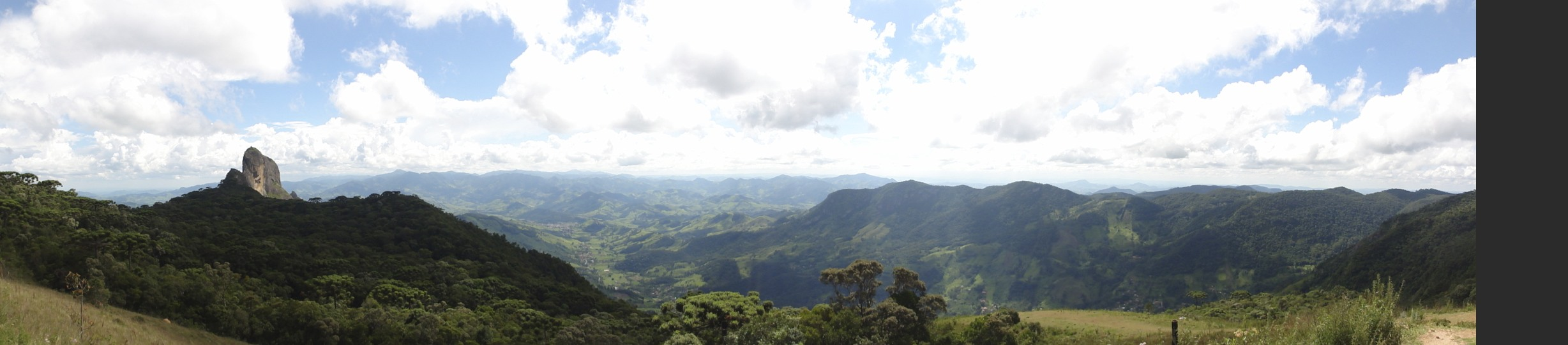
View of Pedra do Baú and surroundings panorama

== Sources ==
- o mosaico mantiqueira (in Portuguese), Mosaico Mantiqueira, archived from the original on 2016-09-27
