= Pedra Selada State Park =

State park in Rio de Janeiro, Brazil

- Parque Estadual da Pedra Selada
- IUCN category II (national park)
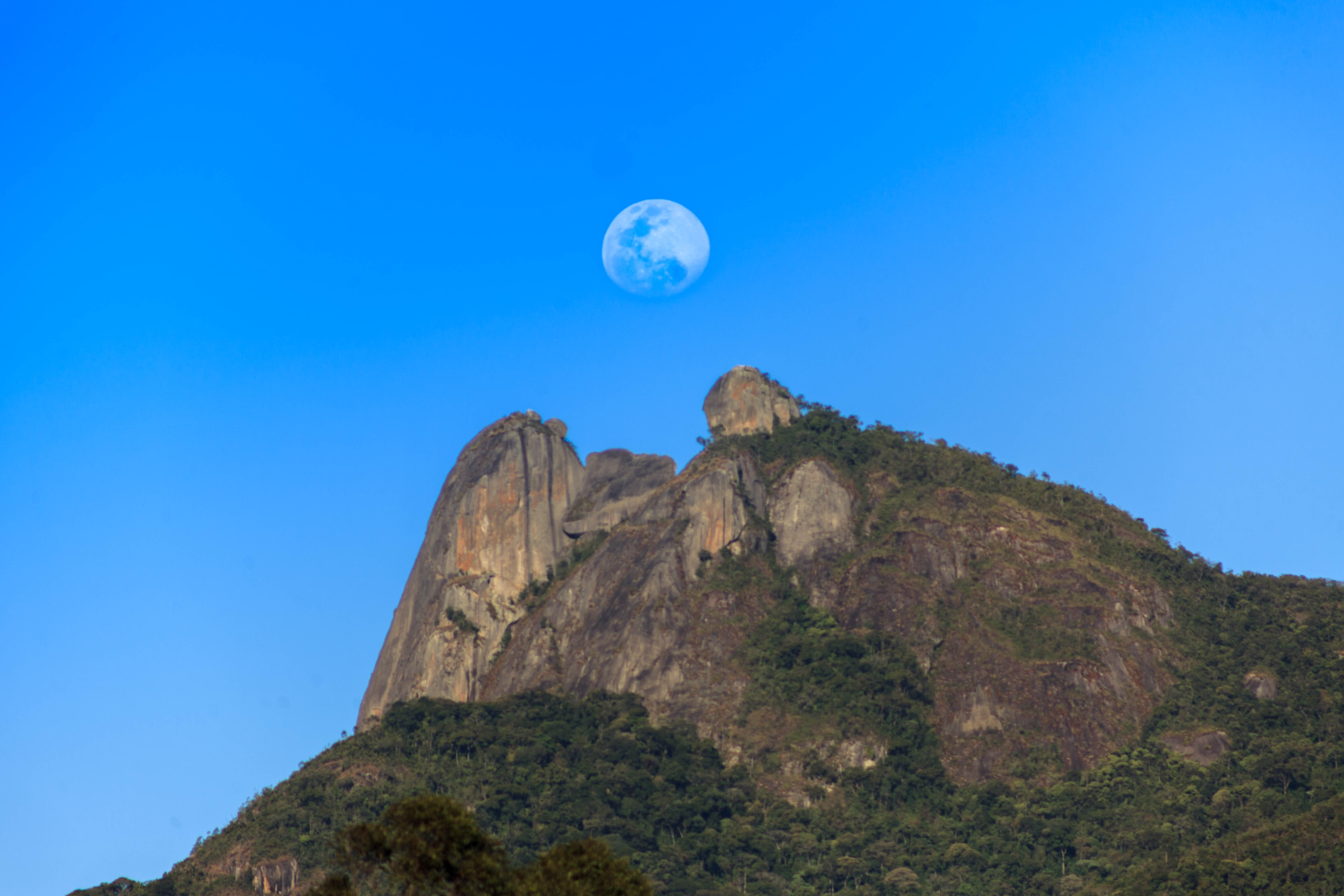
- Pedra Selada

- Location within Brazil
- Nearest city: Resende, Rio de Janeiro
- Coordinates: 22°21′15″S 44°31′57″W
- Area: 8,036 hectares (19,860 acres)
- Designation: State park
- Created: 15 June 2012

The Pedra Selada State Park (Portuguese: Parque Estadual da Pedra Selada) is a state park in the state of Rio de Janeiro, Brazil.

== Location ==
The Pedra Selada State Park lies in the municipalities of Resende and Itatiaia, Rio de Janeiro. It has an area of about 8,036 hectares (19,860 acres). The park provides opportunities for visitors to use the area for recreation, education and research, and contributes to the rural economy in tourism-related businesses. The park is named after the Pedra Selada (Stone Saddle), which is 1,755 metres (5,758 ft) high. A well-marked trail leads to the peak, from which there is a 360^{o} degree view of the surrounding country.

== Environment ==
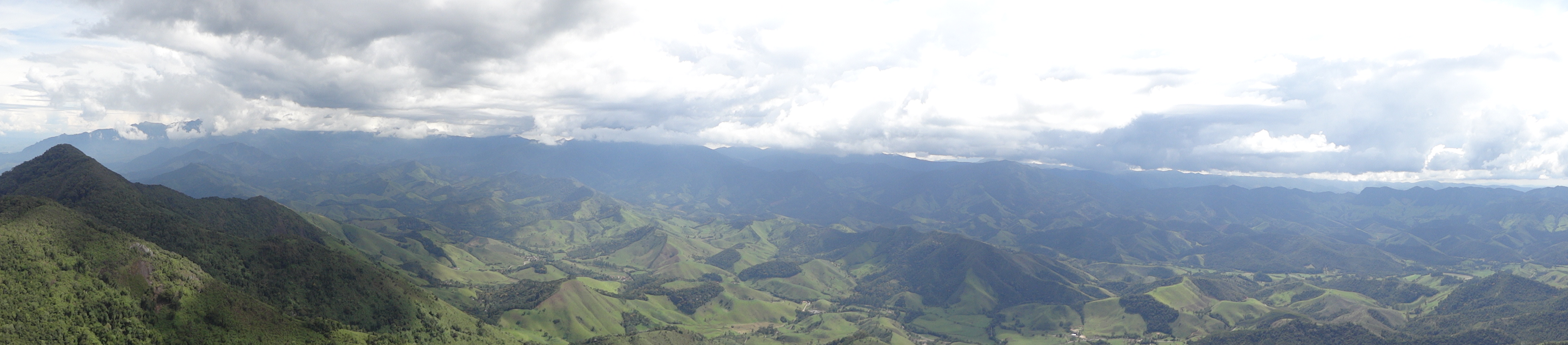
Panoramic view from the Pedra Selada

Vegetation includes remnants of Atlantic Forest, Araucaria Forests and alpine meadows. The state park forms part of an important ecological corridor with the Itatiaia National Park and other nearby public and private conservation units, which protects the source of rivers feeding some of the main rivers of the southeast – the Paraná and Paraíba do Sul – and contributes to preserving the mountain chain in which the Pedra Selada is located.

== History ==
The Pedra Selada State Park was created by state decree 43.640 of 15 June 2012. The objective is to preserve populations of native plants and animals, and to provide refuges for migratory species. It was the first fully protected state-level conservation unit in the Mantiqueira Mountains. It is part of the Mantiqueira Mosaic of conservation units. The consultative council was created on 15 August 2014. The management plan came into effect in 2014.

== Sources ==
- o mosaico mantiqueira (in Portuguese), Mosaico Mantiqueira
- Parque Estadual da Pedra Selada (in Portuguese), INEA: Istituto Estadual do Ambiente (RJ), archived from the original on 2016-09-15
- "Pico da Pedra Selada", Visconde de Mauá (in Portuguese), archived from the original on 2016-03-10
