= São Bento do Sapucaí =

- Municipality
- Municipality of São Bento do Sapucaí
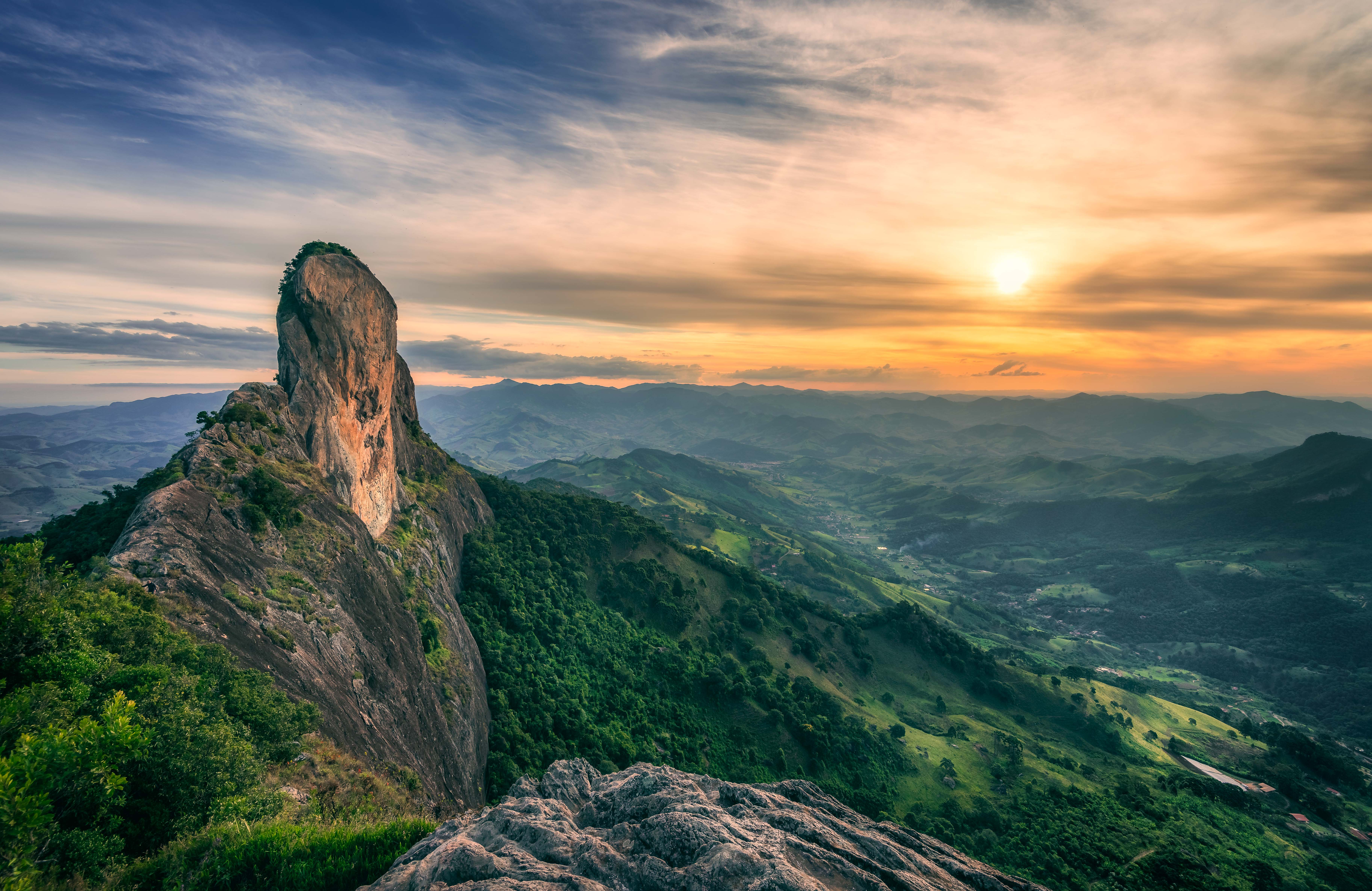
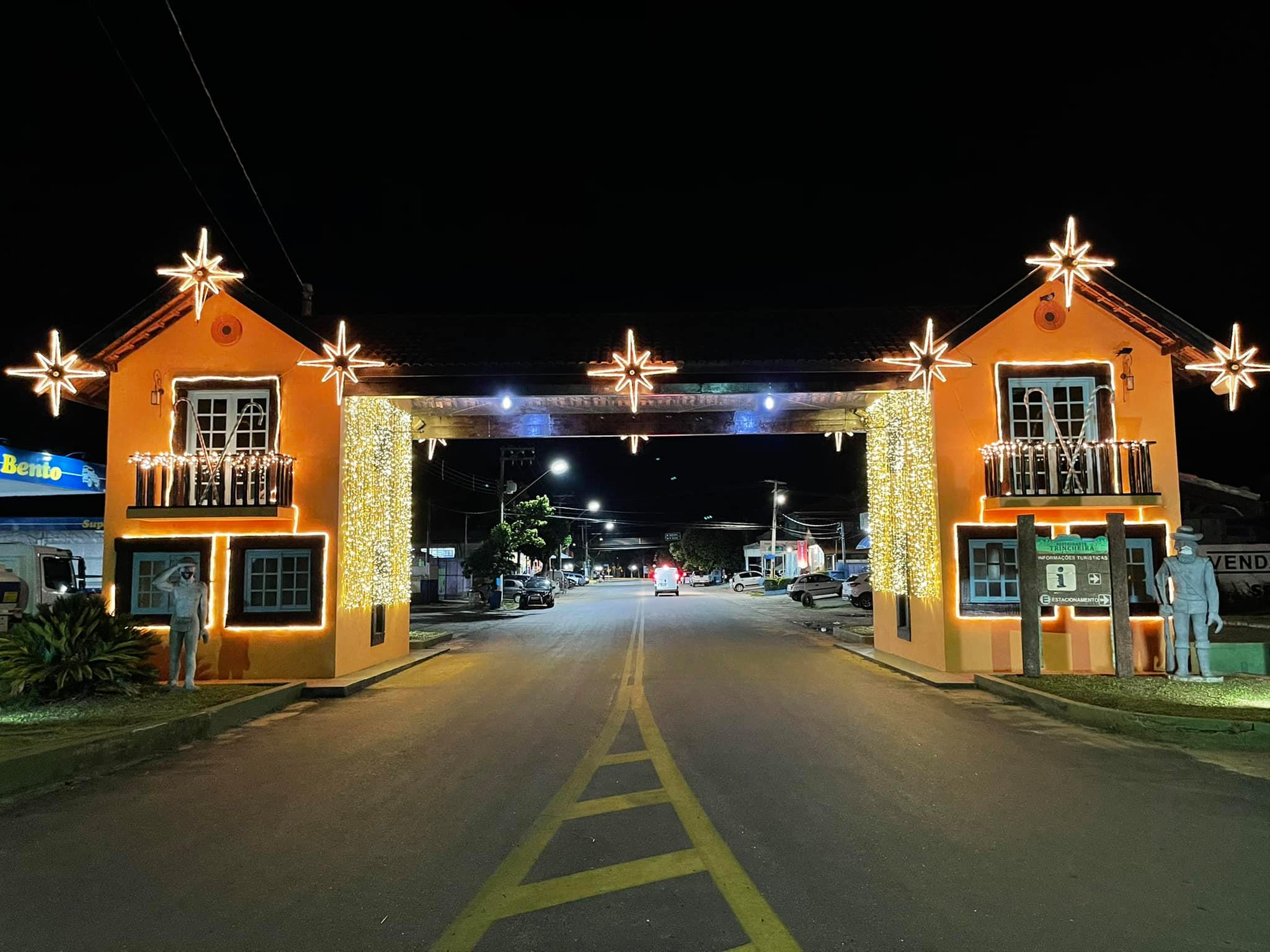
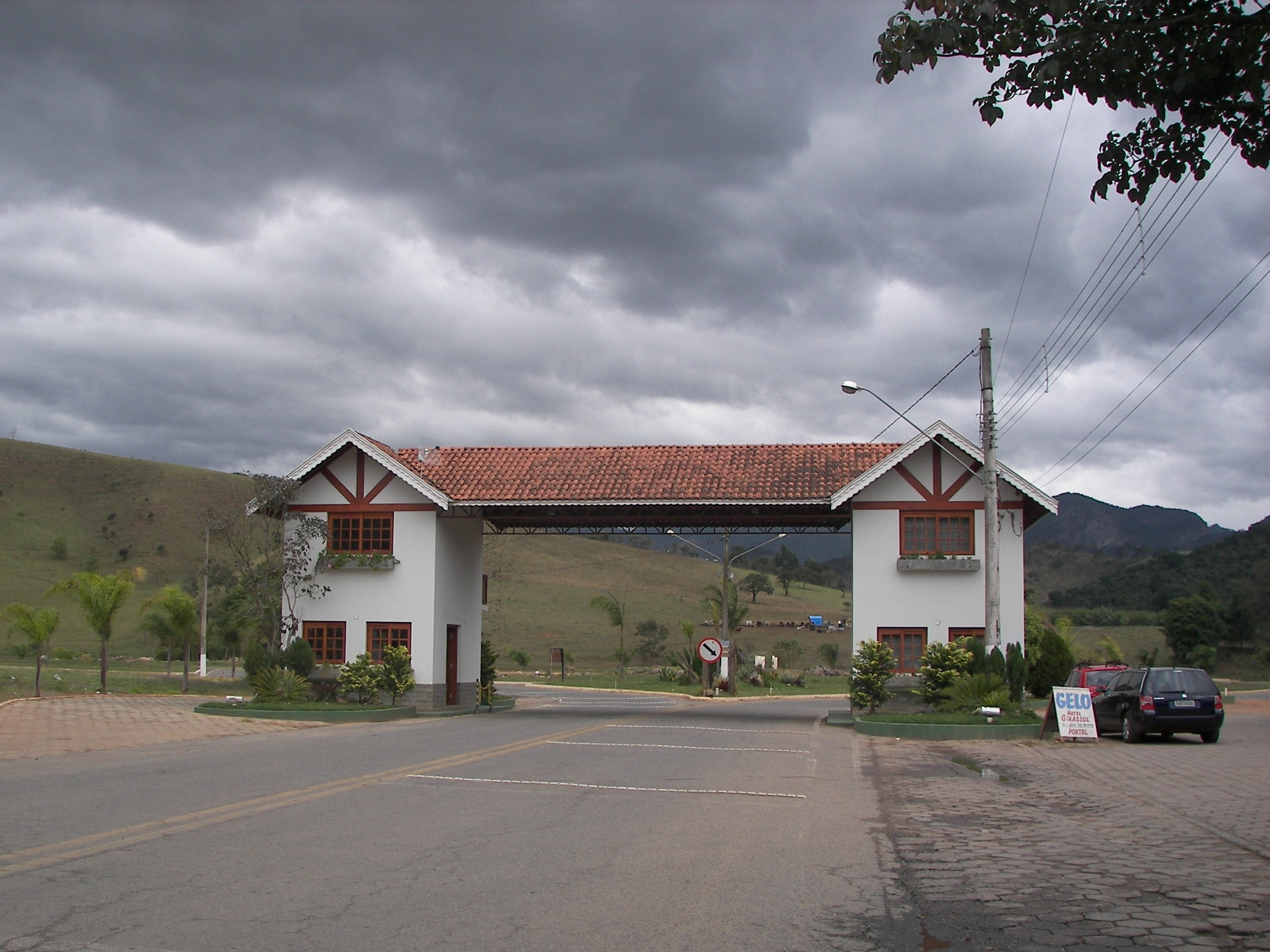
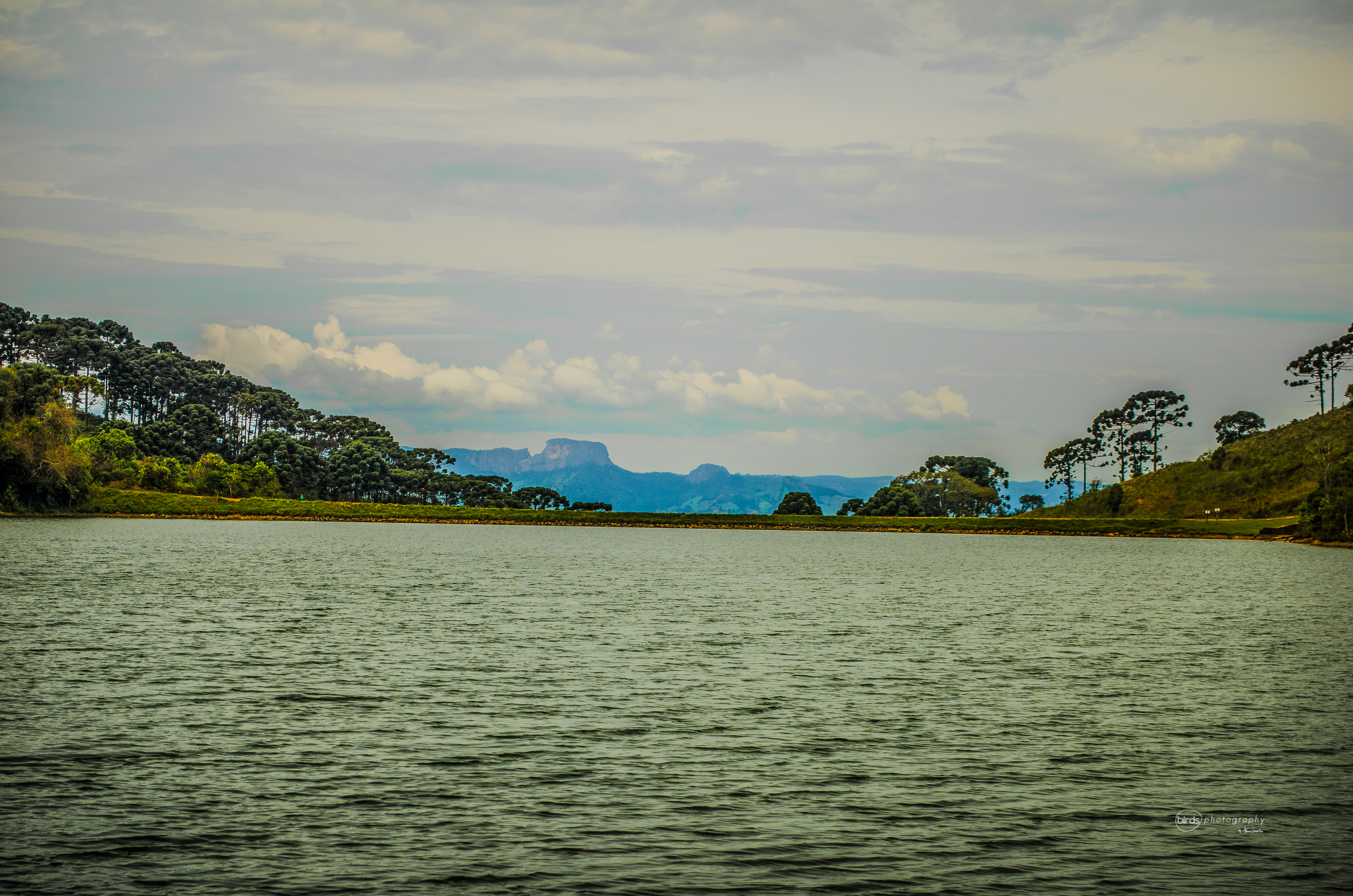
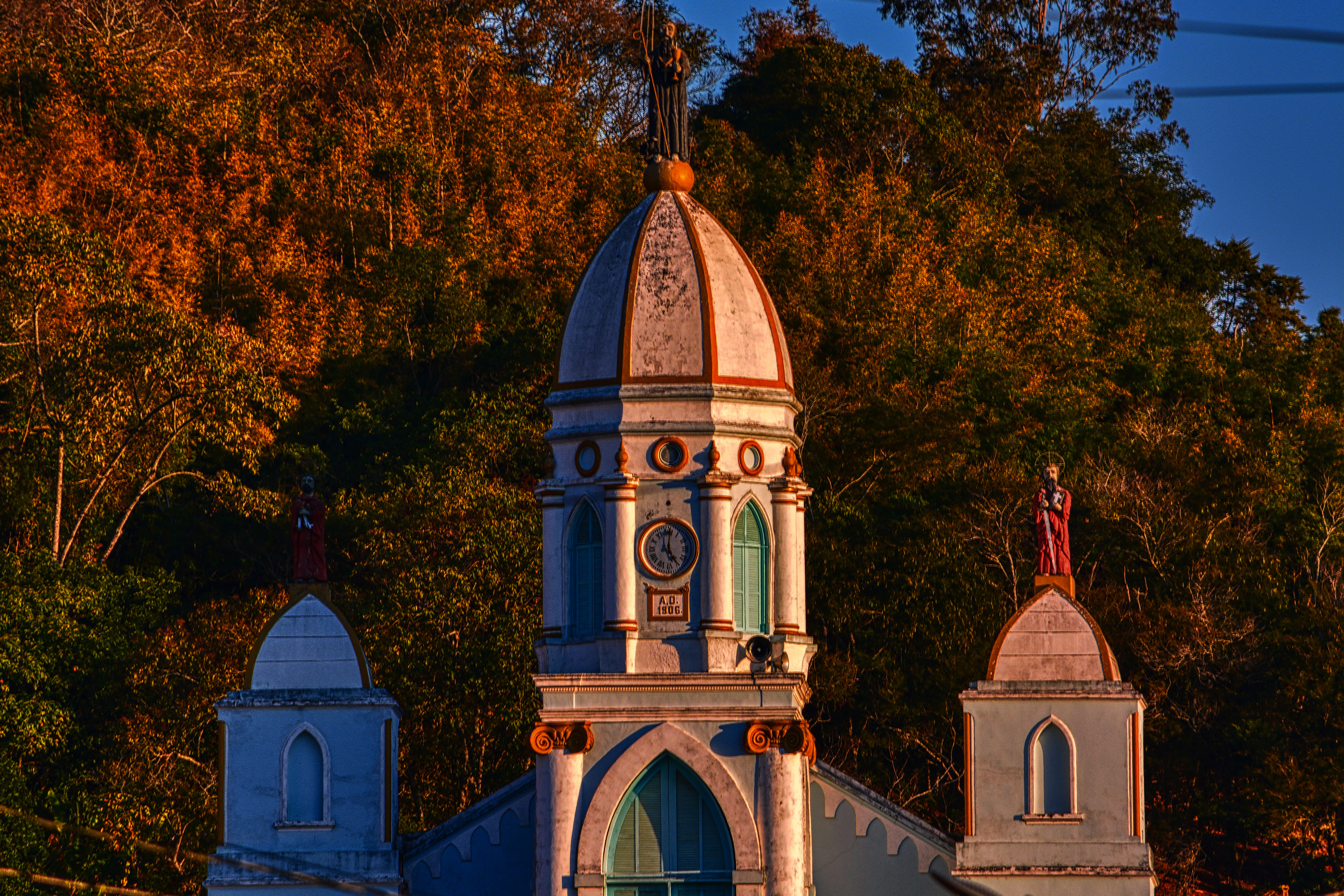
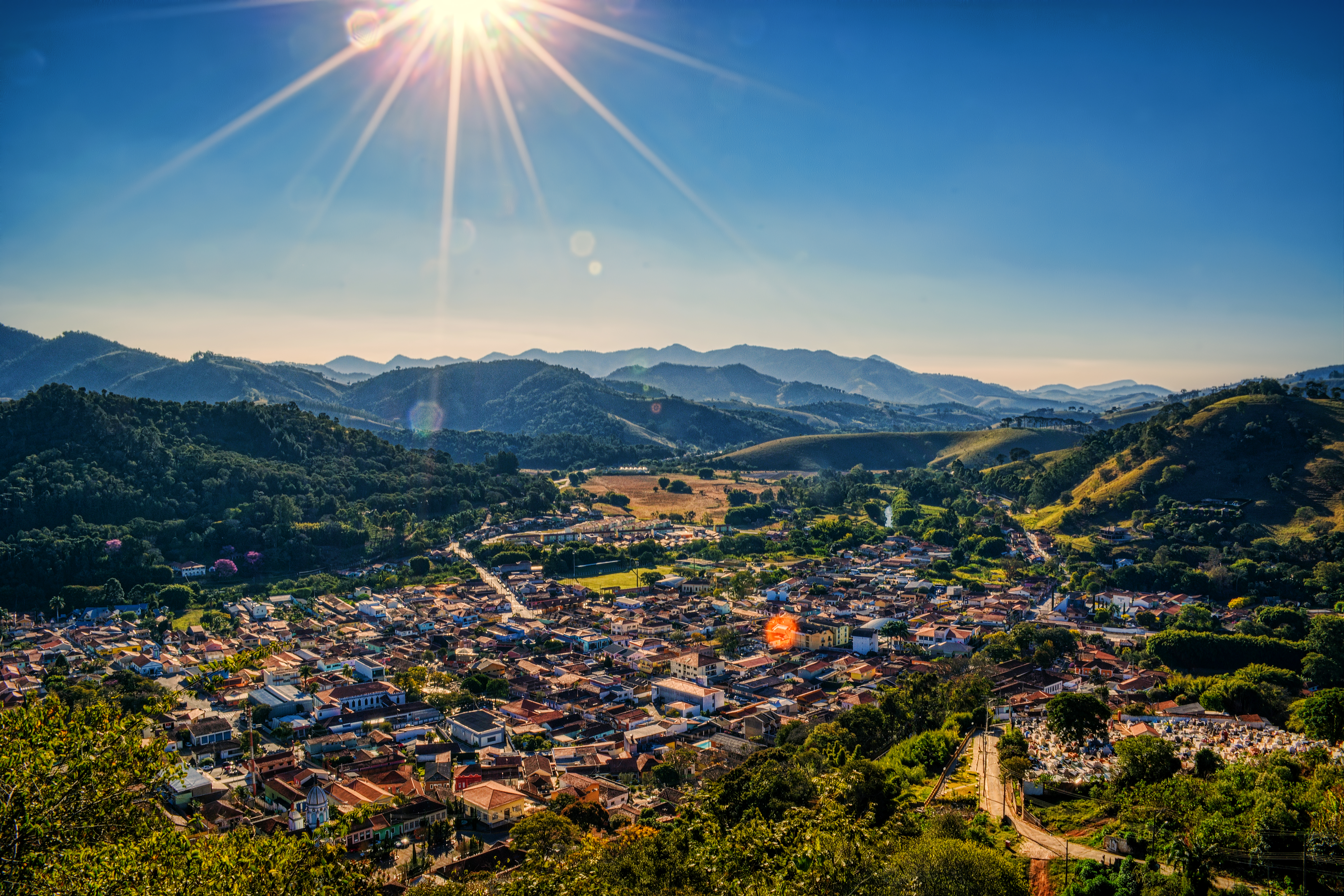
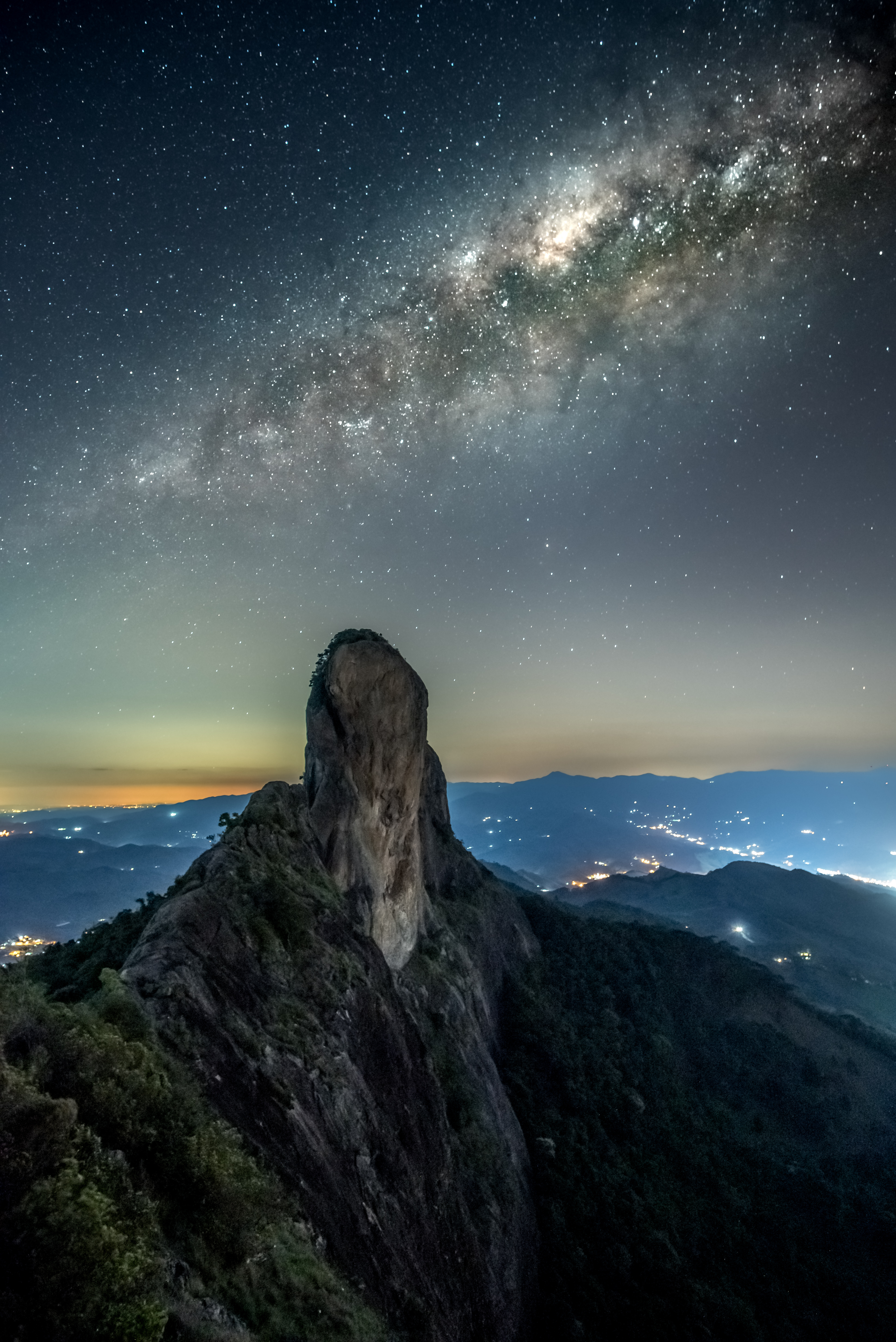
- From top, from left to right: State Natural Monument of Pedra do Baú; "Plínio Salgado" entrance portal at two different times; Brejo Grande Municipal Park; Main Church; aerial view over the city; view of Pedra do Baú at night with the Milky Way in the background.

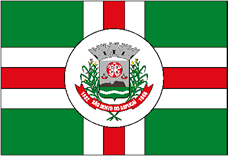
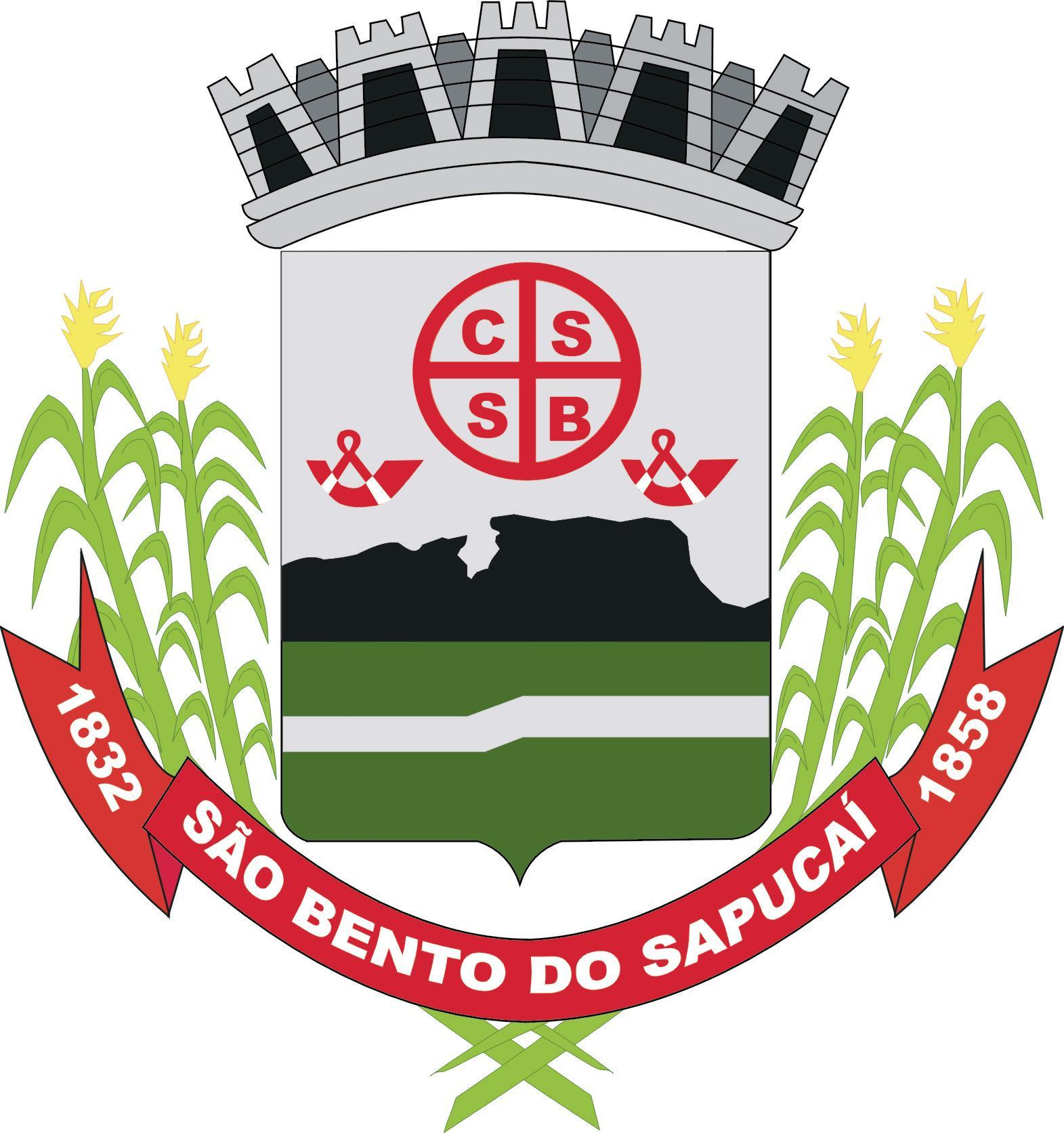
- Flag Coat of arms

- Location in São Paulo state

- Location within Brazil
- Coordinates: 22°41′20″S 45°43′51″W
- Country: Brazil
- Region: Southeast
- State: São Paulo
- Mesoregion: Vale do Paraíba Paulista

Area
  - Total: 252.6 km^{2} (97.5 sq mi)
- Elevation: 886 m (2,907 ft)

Population (2020)
  - Total: 10,893
  - Density: 43.12/km^{2} (111.7/sq mi)
- Demonym: São-bentista
- Time zone: UTC−3 (BRT)
- HDI (2010): 0.720 – high

São Bento do Sapucaí is a Brazilian municipality in São Paulo state.

Once known as a religious and traditional town, now known for its mild weather and beautiful landscapes. The municipality has a population reaching 10,000 inhabitants.

== History ==
First settlings in that area were made by Bandeirantes that went up the Serra da Mantiqueira trying to reach the gold mining regions of Minas Gerais. The town was founded on August 6, 1832, and Saint Benedict was chosen as the patron saint. The name of the place comes from Saint Benedict in Portuguese) and the river Sapucaí, that crosses town. Around 1850, José Pereira Alves and his wife, Ignez Leite de Toledo donated a large area of land to the town, with the purpose of building a great church in honor of St. Benedict. The town's folk went in a religious procession to retrieve an image of the saint from the nearest chapel (which was almost in Sapucaí-Mirim, Minas Gerais), and then the "Igreja Matriz de São Bento" (St. Benedict's Matrix Church) started to be built by the slaves. Still today, you can find in there paintings of well-known artists that date back to 1853.

== Geography ==
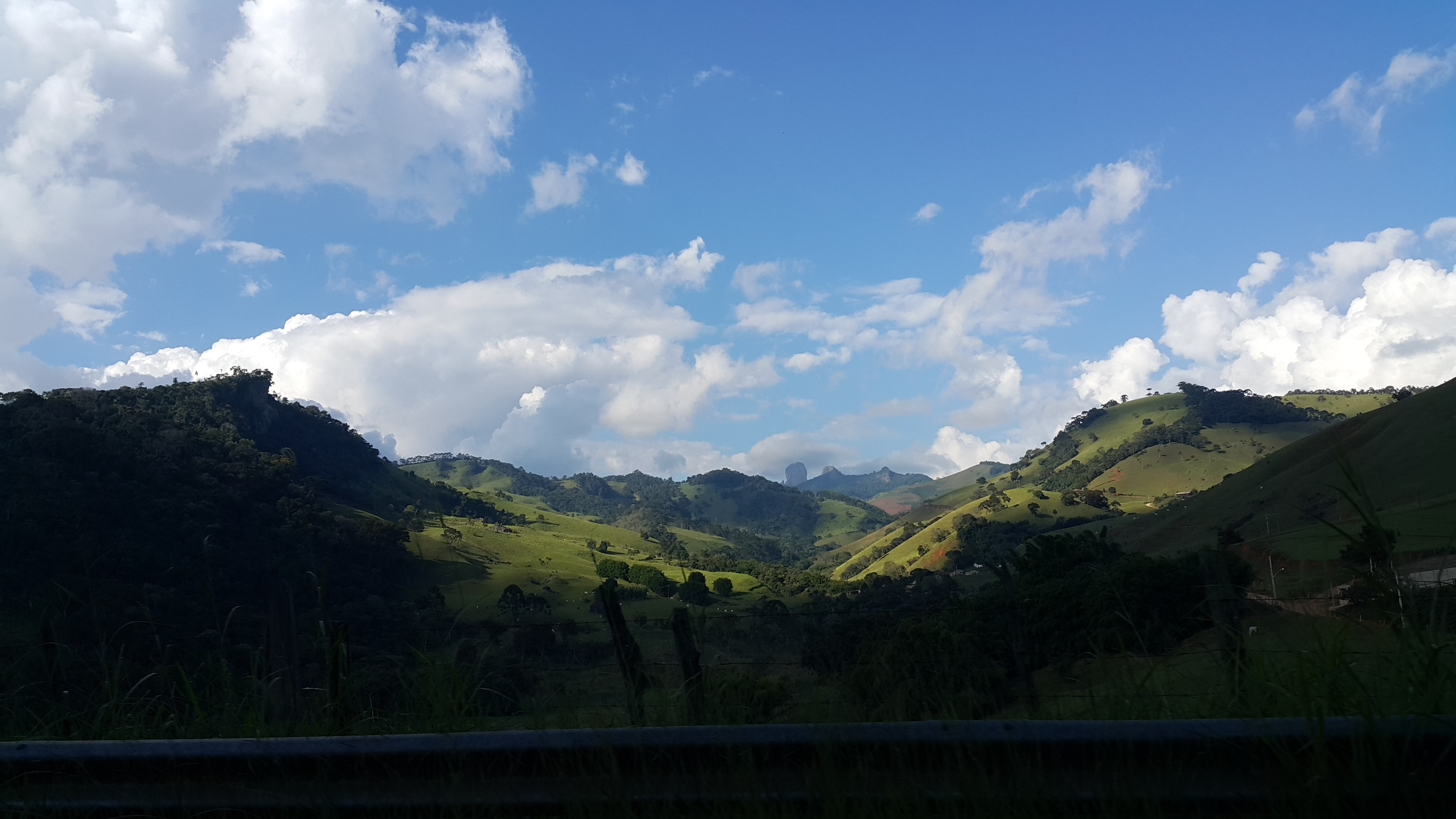
A View of São Bento do Sapucaí countryside from SP-42 highway.

Located 164 km northeast of São Paulo, on a mountain chain called Serra da Mantiqueira, it has a total area of 251.2 km^{2}. The topography is very mountainous. There are many hills and waterfalls (the highest being Toldi Falls with more than 200 m). The city's average altitude is 886 meters, and the highest peak is a rock compound known as Pedra do Baú with an elevation of 1,950 metres (6,400 ft).

The municipality contains 66% of the 39,800-hectare (98,000-acre) Sapucaí Mirim Environmental Protection Area, created in 1998.

== Media ==
In telecommunications, the city was served by Companhia de Telecomunicações do Estado de São Paulo until 1975, when it began to be served by Telecomunicações de São Paulo. In July 1998, this company was acquired by Telefónica, which adopted the Vivo brand in 2012.

The company is currently an operator of cell phones, fixed lines, internet (fiber optics/4G) and television (satellite and cable).

== See also ==
- List of municipalities in São Paulo
