= Serrinha do Alambari Environmental Protection Area =

Protected area in Rio de Janeiro, Brazil

- Área de Proteção Ambiental da Serrinha do Alambari
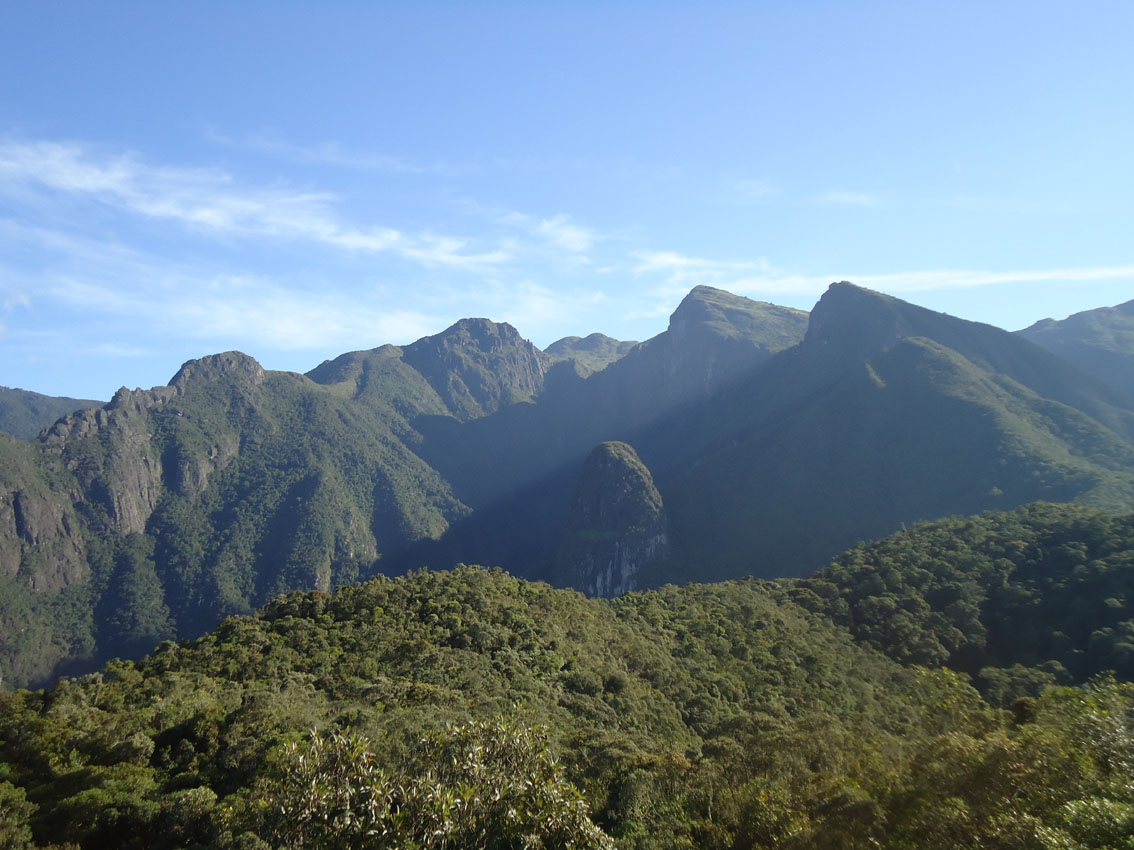
- Divisor de Águas, Serrinha do Alambari

- Location within Brazil
- Nearest city: Resende, Rio de Janeiro
- Coordinates: 22°23′13″S 44°33′14″W
- Area: 5,760 hectares (14,200 acres)
- Designation: Environmental protection area
- Created: 1991

The Serrinha do Alambari Environmental Protection Area (Portuguese: Área de Proteção Ambiental da Serrinha do Alambari) is an environmental protection area in the state of Rio de Janeiro, Brazil.

== Location ==
The Serrinha do Alambari Environmental Protection Area (APA) is in the municipality of Resende, Rio de Janeiro, west of the RJ-163 highway. The APA is on the eastern slope of the Itatiaia National Park in the Mantiqueira Mountains. Elevations range from 700 to 2,300 metres (2,300 to 7,500 ft). It protects the upper reaches of the catchment basins of the Alambari and Pirapitinga rivers. It has an area of 5,760 hectares (14,200 acres).

The APA is in the Agulhas Negras region, known for its mountain scenery and waterfalls of cold, clear water. The ecosystem is well-preserved. There is a master plan for the APA, which supports ecotourism, adventure tourism and outdoor sports. It contains a trout farm, and a mountain camping location.

== History ==
The Serrinha do Alambari Environmental Protection Area was created by Municipal Law 1.726 of 1991. The Master Plan for Eco-Development of the APA was approved by law No. 1,845 of 1994. The APA is part of the Mantiqueira Mosaic of conservation units, established in 2006.

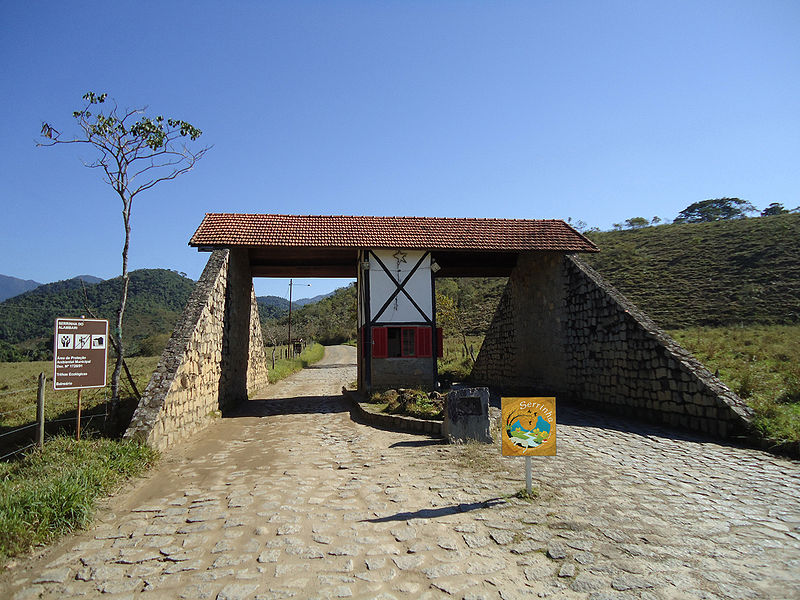
Entrance to the APA

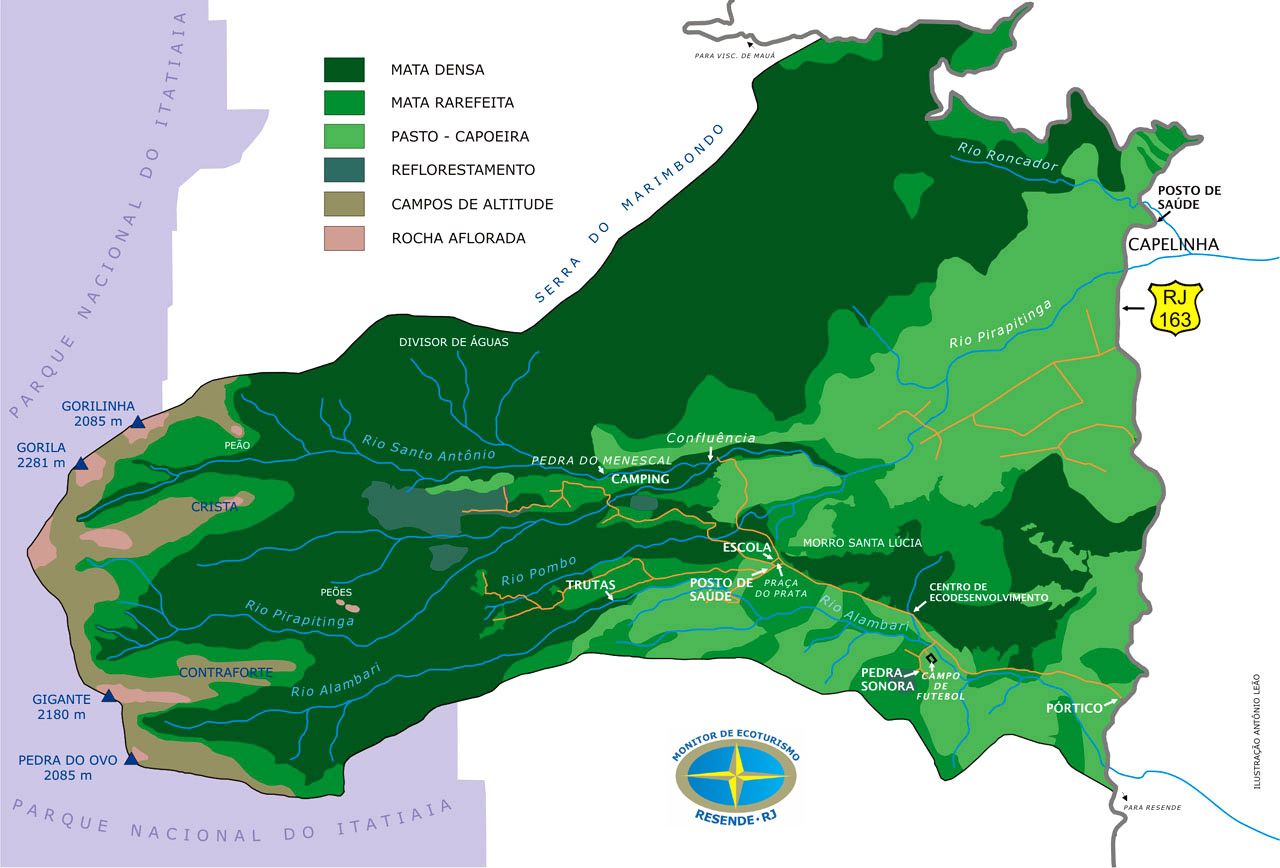
Map of the APA

== Sources ==
- APA da Serrinha do Alambari (in Portuguese), Prefeitura de Resende
- o mosaico mantiqueira (in Portuguese), Mosaico Mantiqueira, archived from the original on 2016-09-27
