= BR-459 (Brazil highway) =

Federal highway in Brazil

BR-459

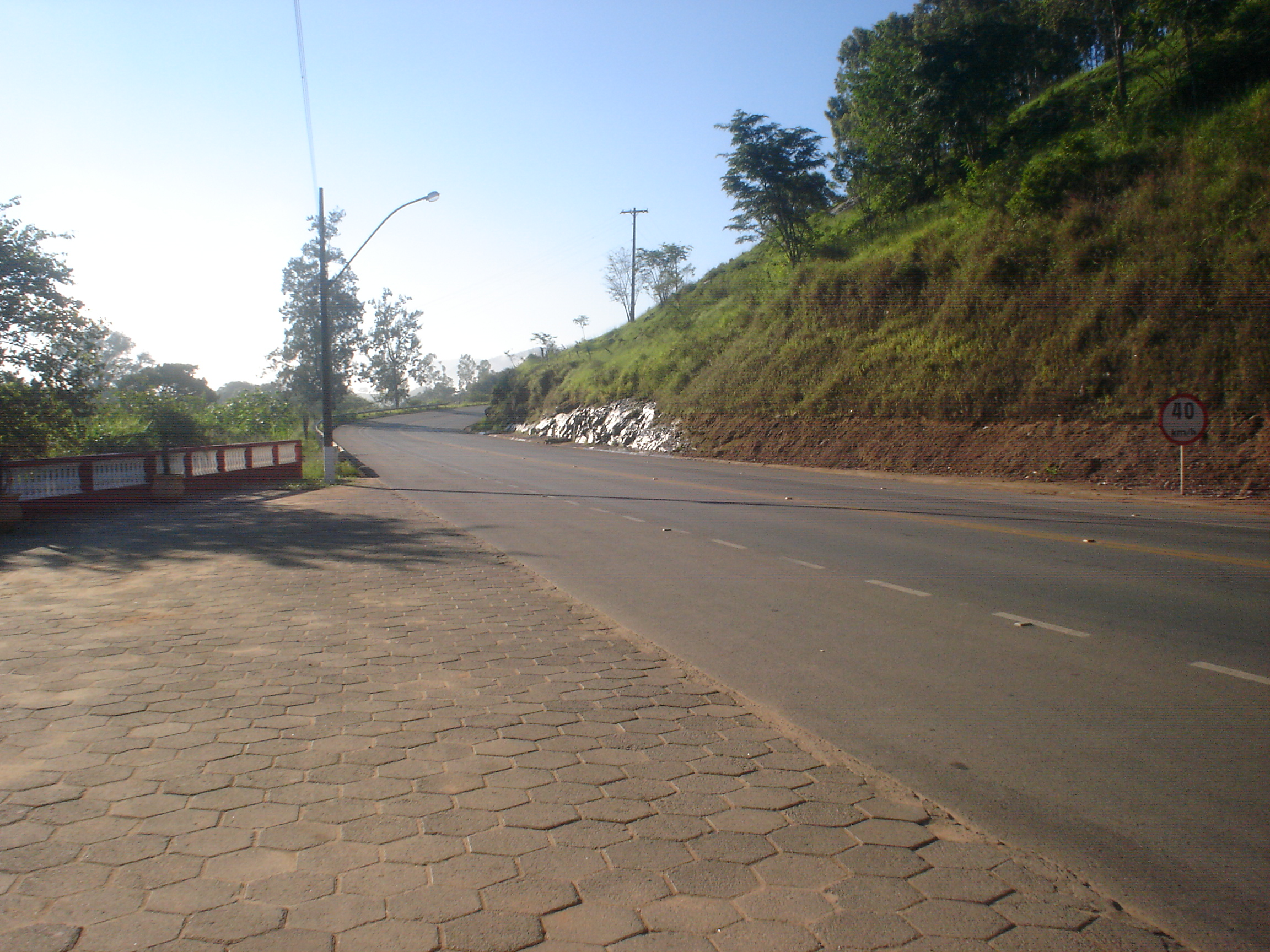

Route information
- Length: 247.6 km (153.9 mi)

Major junctions
- North end: BR-267 in Poços de Caldas
- South end: BR-101 in Paraty

Location
- Country: Brazil

Highway system
- Highways in Brazil; Federal
← BR-458	→ BR-460

BR-459 is a federal highway that connects Poços de Caldas, in Minas Gerais, to Lorena, in the state of São Paulo. Its extension is planned to the municipality of Angra dos Reis, in the state of Rio de Janeiro.

== Route description ==
In the state of Minas Gerais, the BR-459 is 215.4 km (133.8 mi) long and passes through the municipalities of Poços de Caldas, Caldas, Santa Rita de Caldas, Ipuiúna, Senador José Bento, Congonhal, Pouso Alegre, Santa Rita do Sapucaí, Cachoeira de Minas, Piranguinho, Itajubá, Wenceslau Braz e Delfim Moreira, located in the Mesoregion of the South and Southwest of Minas. km 0 of the stretch in Minas Gerais is located in Poços de Caldas, while km 215.4 is located on the border with the state of São Paulo. In this state, the highway is part of the Caminhos Gerais, Serras Verdes do Sul de Minas and Caminhos do Sul de Minas tourist circuits.

In the state of São Paulo, BR-459 is 32.2 km (20.0 mi) long and crosses the municipalities of Piquete and Lorena, located in the Mesoregion of Vale do Paraíba Paulista. km 0 of the São Paulo stretch is located on the border with Minas Gerais and km 32.2 at the junction with BR-116.

== Future ==
The planned extension for BR-459 passes through the states of São Paulo and Rio de Janeiro. In São Paulo, the layout of this extension includes a stretch that coincides with the BR-116 in the municipalities of Lorena and Guaratinguetá and the entire SP-171 highway, passing through Cunha. In the state of Rio de Janeiro, the extension coincides with the RJ-165, in Paraty, and with a stretch of the BR-101 to Angra dos Reis, thus incorporating approximately 212 kilometers between the municipalities of Lorena and Angra dos Reis.
