= MG-347 (Minas Gerais highway) =

Highway in Minas Gerais, Brazil

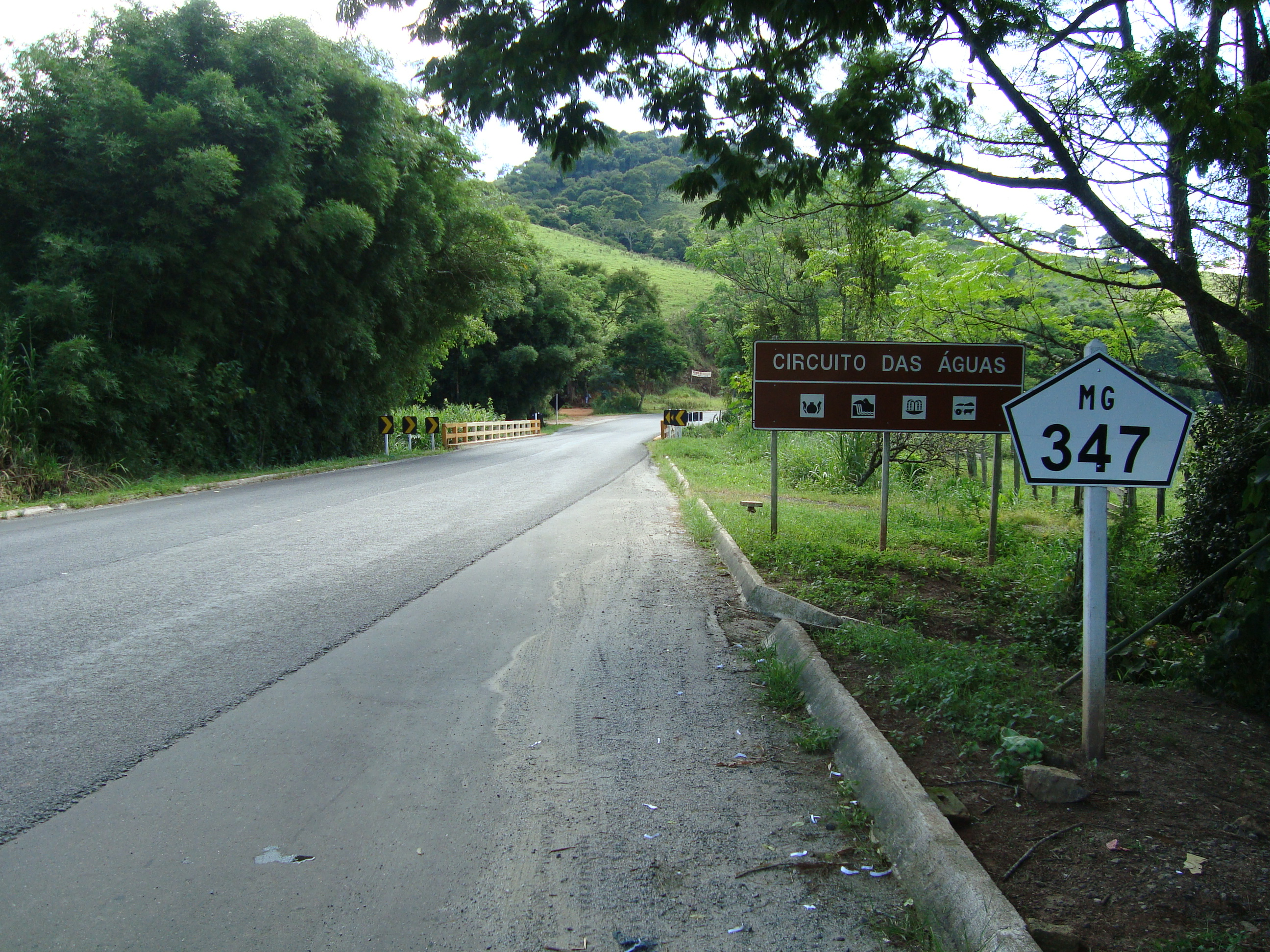
- Section of the MG-347 highway in the municipality of Cristina.

Route information
- Length: 66 km (41 mi)

Major junctions
- Northeast end: Carmo de Minas
- Southwest end: Junction with the BR-459 highway in Piranguinho

Location
- Country: Brazil
- State: Minas Gerais

Highway system
- Highways in Brazil; Federal; Minas Gerais State Highways

The MG-347 is a state highway located in the Brazilian state of Minas Gerais. Due to the direction it travels, it is considered a diagonal road.

== Route ==
The MG-347 highway is 66 km (41 mi) long and is entirely paved. It connects Carmo de Minas — a municipality in the Circuito das Águas — to the BR-459 highway, in the municipality of Piranguinho. The highway is located in the Mesoregion of the South and Southwest of Minas Gerais and passes through the municipalities of Carmo de Minas, Cristina, Pedralva, São José do Alegre and Piranguinho.
