= Maria do Carmo Gerônimo =

Brazilian supercentenarian and former slave (5 March 1871-14 June 2000)

- Born: 5 March 1871 (according to baptism records); Carmo de Minas, Minas Gerais, Empire of Brazil
- Died: 14 June 2000 (claimed age 129); Itajubá, Minas Gerais
- Known for: Last victim of slavery to die in Brazil
- Awards: Zumbi dos Palmares Centenary Medal

Maria do Carmo Gerônimo (died 14 June 2000) was a Brazilian woman of African descent and former Brazilian slave who, according to baptism records, was the oldest person in the world before her death. However, due to the lack of a birth certificate or any other official civil documents proving her date of birth, (at that time, birth certificates were not issued at time of birth) her claim was never accepted and recognized by The Guinness Book of Records. The claimed final age of 129 years is also seven years older than the oldest verified human in history. It is not disputed that she was the last surviving Brazilian slave.

== Early life ==
According to church records from the Nossa Senhora do Carmo Parish in Campanha in the south of Minas Gerais state in the Empire of Brazil, Gerônimo was born on 5 March 1871 under the reign of Emperor Pedro II and was baptised 16 days later. This was a few months before the Rio Branco Law that freed all children born to enslaved mothers. She was the daughter of Sabrina and Gerônimo, slaves of Luiz José Monteiro de Noronha, a sugar-cane farmer, and owner of a pottery and a hotel. She had three siblings, one of whom was killed after being kicked by a horse. Her mother died when she was about eight and she was separated from her other siblings after they were taken to another farm. She recalled being frequently beaten. At the age of 15 she was sold to a farmer from Baependi in Minas Gerais and lived as a slave until she was 17, when slavery was abolished in Brazil under the Lei Áurea of 13 May 1888. At this time, she returned to her birth town of Carmo de Minas.

== Life ==
In the 1930s, Gerônimo moved to the city of Cristina from where, at Christmas 1942, she went to live in Itajubá, Minas Gerais to be the maid in the family of thirteen children of the historian José Armelim Bernardo Guimarães. Guimarães was the grandson of Bernardo Guimarães who, coincidentally, had written a famous novel called Isaura the Slave Girl. She lived with the family for 58 years until her death.

== Appreciation ==
Gerônimo became famous in the later stages of her life. She was interviewed by many newspapers and magazines in Brazil, and by Brazilian and foreign TV stations, including from Argentina, Germany, France, Italy, Japan, Spain, and the US. She was made an honorary citizen of six Brazilian cities, although not of her home city of Itajubá.

In 1995 she was awarded the Zumbi dos Palmares centenary medal (named after the leader of a group of slaves who liberated themselves) and travelled with the mayor of Rio de Janeiro, César Maia, to the city to realize her dream of seeing the sea.

She was honoured during the 1996 Rio Carnival parade at the Sambadrome, parading with the Unidos da Tijuca samba school, which had the end of slavery as its theme. On 5 October 1997, she received the personal blessing of Pope John Paul II at a mass in Rio de Janeiro.

The 1994 Brazilian equivalent of the Guinness Book of Records recorded Gerônimo as the oldest person in the world but the Guinness Book of Records itself did not accept her claim due to the lack of civil records.

== Death ==
Gerônimo died of a stroke on 14 June 2000 at the hospital at the faculty of medicine in Itajubá. On the basis of church records, she would have been 129 years old. However, some historians have noted that her age could have been exaggerated so that she would not qualify for freedom under the 1871 Rio Branco Law.
