= Rádio Unifei =

Radio station of the Universidade Federal de Itajubá in Itajubá, Brazil

Rádio Unifei (ZYL242)
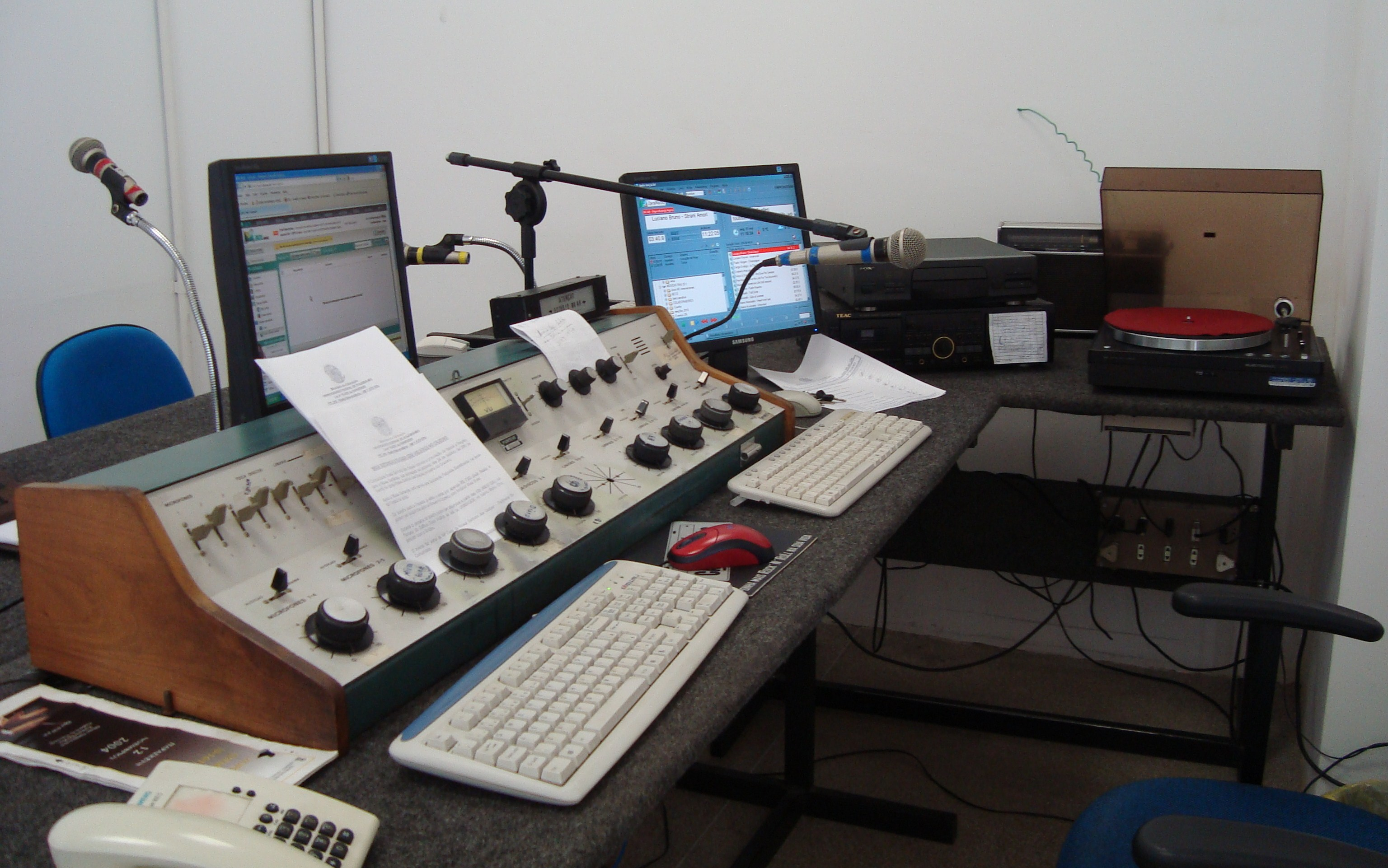
- The Rádio Unifei studio

Itajubá, Minas Gerais; Brazil
- Frequency: 1570 kHz

Programming
- Format: Campus radio

Ownership
- Owner: Universidade Federal de Itajubá

History
- First air date: November 23, 1961
- Former names: Rádio Universitária
- Former frequencies: 1490 kHz

Technical information
- Licensing authority: ANATEL
- Power: 1 kW day 250 watts night
- Transmitter coordinates: 22°24′42″S 45°26′38″W

Links
- Public license information: Profile
- Website: www.radiouniversitaria.unifei.edu.br

Rádio Unifei is a campus radio station owned and operated by the Federal University of Itajubá, in Itajubá, Minas Gerais, Brazil, broadcasting on 1570 kHz AM.

The radio station broadcasts mainly non-commercial advertising, Brazilian popular music, university and city news, rock n' roll and reggae music. Currently, the station employs three full-time employees and five university students working as "undergraduate monitors".

== History ==
Rádio Unifei was put on the air on 1490 kHz in 1961 under the direction of José Leite, professor at the then-Electrotechnical Institute of Itajubá. Much of the transmission and studio equipment was built or repaired by students. In the 1970s, the station received a commercial license and moved to 1570 kHz, operating with 250 watts.
