= Pouso Alegre =

Coordinates: 22°13′41″S 45°56′01″W

- Municipality
- Municipality of Pouso Alegre
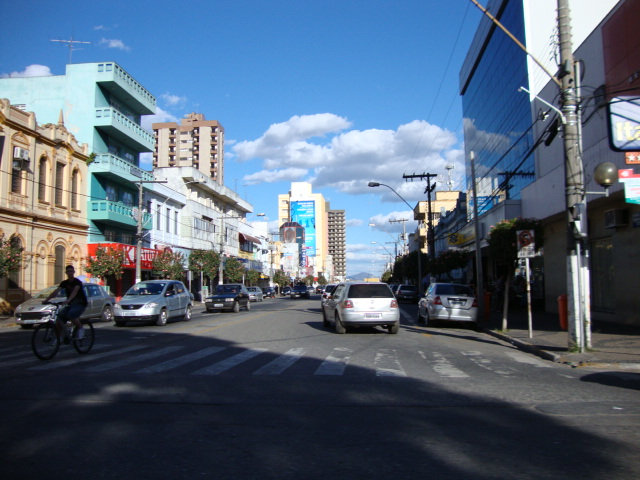

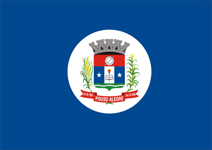
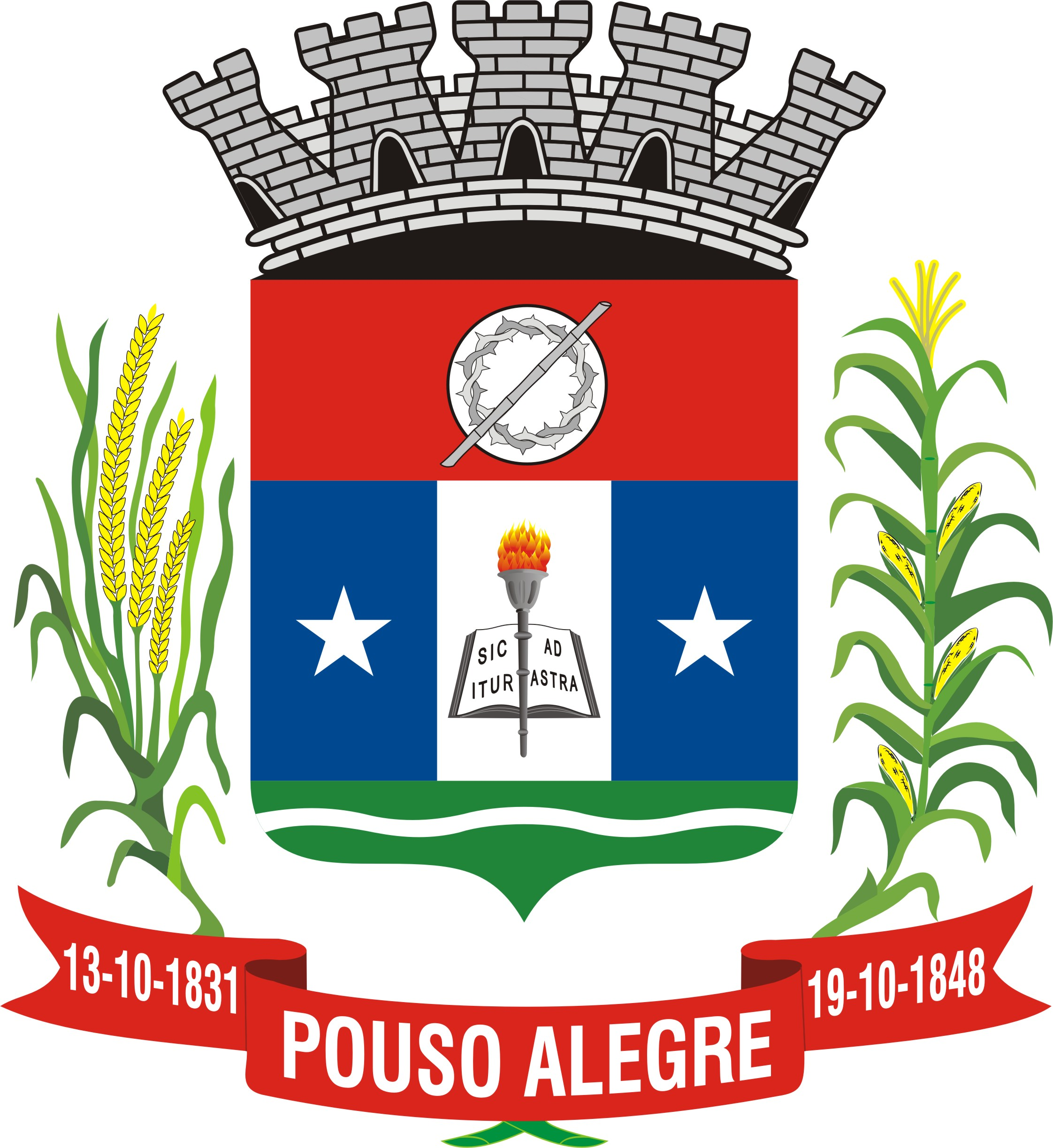
- Flag Coat of arms

- Country: Brazil
- Region: Southeast
- State: Minas Gerais
- Founded: October 19, 1848

Government
  - Mayor: Rafael Simões (DEM)

Area
  - Municipality: 542.797 km^{2} (209.575 sq mi)
- Elevation: 832 m (2,730 ft)

Population (2025)
  - Municipality: 162,133
  - Density: 298.699/km^{2} (773.627/sq mi)
  - Urban: 139,608
  - City/Settlement: 148,700
- Time zone: UTC−3 (BRT)
- HDI (2010): 0.774 – high
- Website: pousoalegre.mg.gov.br

Pouso Alegre is a municipality in southern region of Minas Gerais state, Brazil, with a population of 162,133 in 2020. The area of the municipality is 543 km^{2}. It lies in the valley of the Sapucaí River.

Cities that form boundaries with Pouso Alegre are: Cachoeira de Minas, Santa Rita do Sapucaí, Careaçu, São Sebastião da Bela Vista, Estiva, Congonhal, São João da Mata and Silvianópolis.

The distance to the state capital, Belo Horizonte, is 385 km, to São Paulo 202 km, and to Rio de Janeiro 390 km. The city is 8 km away from its airport, Pouso Alegre Airport. from the main interstate highway BR-381 (Rodovia Fernão Dias), which connects São Paulo to Belo Horizonte.

Pouso Alegre is an industrial center with industries in the food sector, textiles, and metallurgy. Many national and multinational enterprises have their plants here. Their activities include food (Unilever), clothing (Searchco), cars (Usiparts - Johnson Control's - Sumidenso), pharmaceuticals (ACG Capsules, Uniao Quimica, Sanobiol), glass (Sobral Invicta), and many other small and medium enterprises.

== Geography ==
According to the modern (2017) geographic classification by Brazil's National Institute of Geography and Statistics (IBGE), the city is the main municipality in the Intermediate Geographic Region of Pouso Alegre.

=== Distances ===
- Itajubá 65 km
- Santa Rita do Sapucaí (“Valley Electronics”) 25 km
- Poços de Caldas 100 km
- Varginha (dry port / customs) 123 km
- São Paulo 200 km
- Santos (harbor) 260 km
- São José dos Campos 150 km
- Campinas (international airport) 200 km
- Guarulhos (international airport) 180 km
- Senador José Bento 32 km
- Belo Horizonte 384 km
- Rio de Janeiro 360 km
- Porto Alegre 1,300 km
- Salvador 1,790 km
- Recife 2,400 km
- Brasília 1,084 km

== History ==
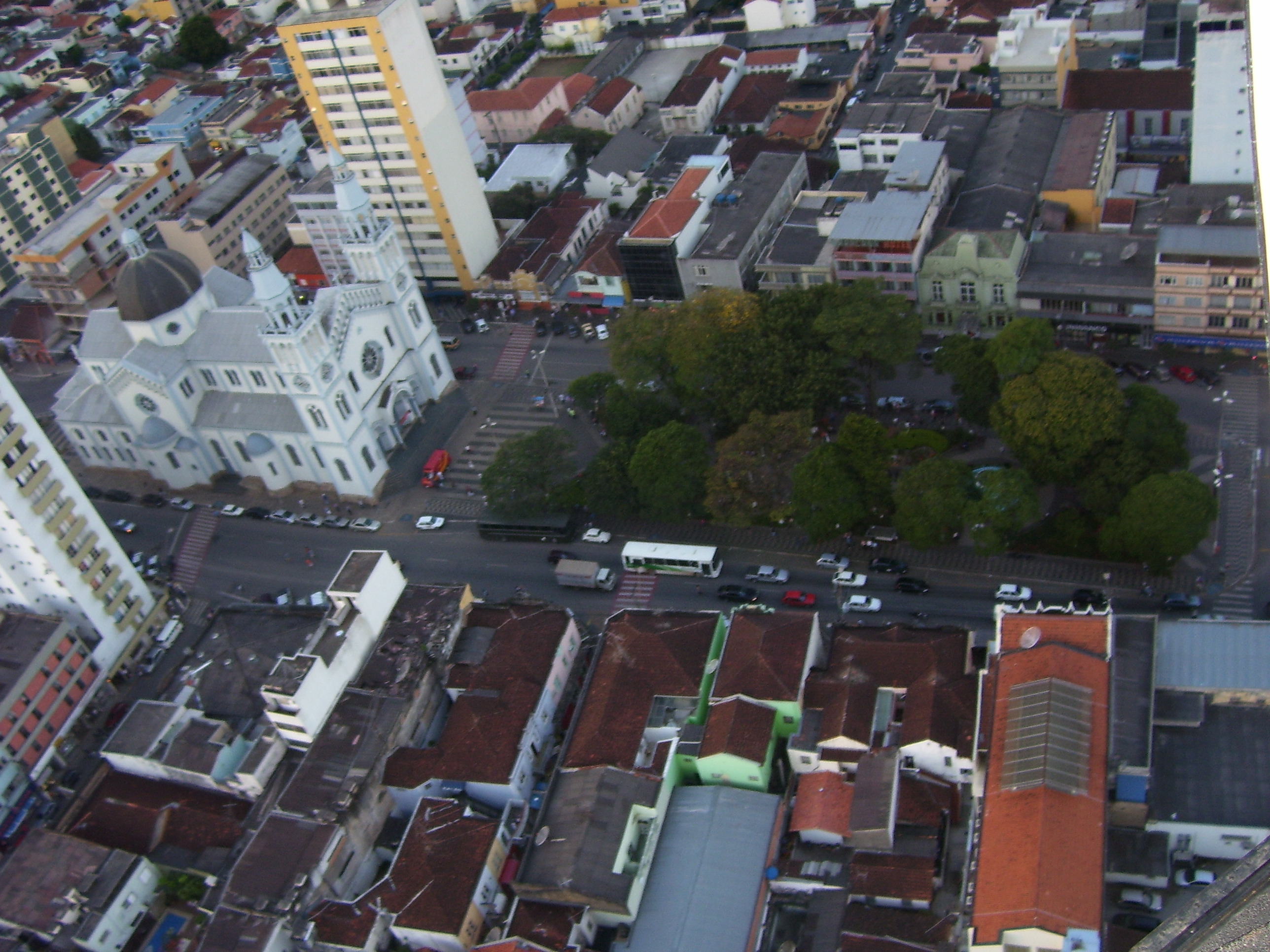
Senator Joseph Benedict Square in front of the Metropolitan Cathedral, both located in the central area of the city.

The "Bandeirantes" explored all the Brazilian country looking for gold and other mineral resources. They were the first European explorers to arrive in the ancient Pouso Alegre region, in 1596.

After discovering gold in the Santana's mines, they founded the new village called "Matosinho do Mandu", Pouso Alegre's first name. New paths were built to connect Pouso Alegre to other cities. These paths connected it to São Paulo and to Vila Rica.

In 1797 the Governor Dom Bernardo José de Lorena, Sarzedas Baron, passing by the small village became so enchanted by its nature, by "the vast and clean horizons", said "This village should not be called Mandu, but Pouso Alegre". In Portuguese, Pouso Alegre means "a joyful stay".

The 2009 census of the city population was 131,462 inhabitants. The city is the nineteenth largest city in Minas Gerais and the second largest in southern Minas Gerais.

=== Population growth ===
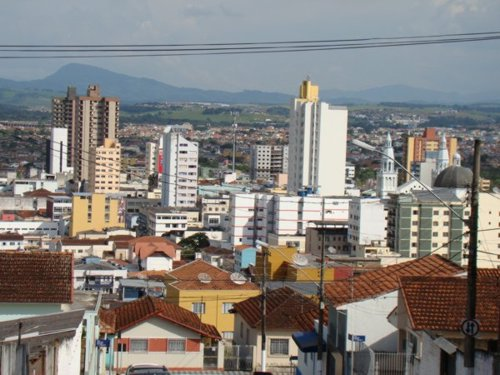
View from the city center in 2009.

- 1996 - 94,354 inhabitants
- 2000 - 106,457 inhabitants
- 2010 - 140,658 inhabitants

The city of Pouso Alegre stands out in the region by high buildings found in its central region. The highest building in the city is building Octávio Meyer, with 70m and 20 floors. It has been the highest building since 2004, the year of its completion.

== Demography ==
According to the 2022 census, Pouso Alegre had a population of 152,212, making it the second most populous municipality in southern Minas Gerais and the 17th largest in Minas Gerais, representing a 16.53% increase compared to the 2010 Census. Although the majority of the population lives in urban areas, an estimated 10,000 people live in rural areas. The municipality also has the second largest electorate in southern Minas Gerais.

== Economy ==
=== Commercial specifications ===
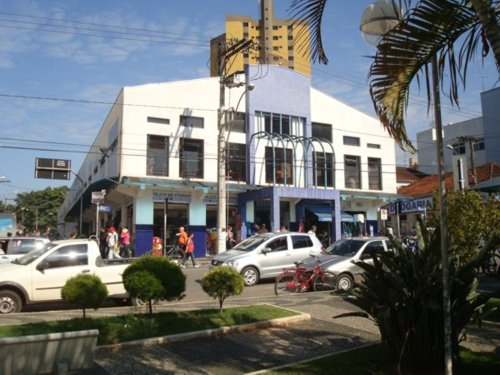
Municipal Market in Pouso Alegre.

Pouso Alegre has more than 4,500 stores in its commercial area. The statistic is made by ACIPA in 2010. Some of the stores in the city are: Bob's, Chilli Beans, Colcci, Cia. Hering, Kaza Houseware, M.Officer, N-Store, OAK Shop.

=== Business and industry ===
The city is an important industrial center in the region. Several different kinds of industries are present in the city. In 2012 the city will receive the largest Chinese investment in Latin America, with the installation of heavy machinery industry, XCMG, YOFC, and 18 other industries have settled in the city between 2008 and 2012. Some of the industries in the city are: Unilever, Ball Corporation, Alpargatas, and Yoki.

== Sports ==
Estádio Municipal Irmão Gino Maria Rossi, which is nicknamed Manduzão, is the home of Pouso Alegre Futebol Clube. The stadium has a capacity of 17,000.

== See also ==
- List of municipalities in Minas Gerais
