= Lucas Fonseca =

Brazilian footballer

Personal information
- Full name: Lucas Silva Fonseca
- Date of birth: 2 August 1985 (age 41)
- Place of birth: Pedralva, Brazil
- Height: 1.91 m (6 ft 3 in)
- Position: Centre back

Senior career*
Years	Team	Apps	(Gls)
2008	Brasilis	0	(0)
2009	Lemense	22	(0)
2010–2011	União São João	19	(0)
2011	→ Guarani (loan)	6	(0)
2012–2013	Mogi Mirim	41	(0)
2012	→ Bahia (loan)	10	(0)
2013–2014	Bahia	67	(0)
2015	Tianjin Teda	25	(0)
2016–2021	Bahia	167	(2)
Total		357	(2)
- * Club domestic league appearances and goals as of 03:48, 25 October 2021 (UTC)

Lucas Silva Fonseca (born 2 August 1985) is a Brazilian footballer as a central defender.

== Club career ==
On 18 January 2015, Lucas Fonseca had his contract with Bahia terminated by mutual consent. On 19 January, he transferred to Chinese Super League side Tianjin Teda.

Fonseca was widely ridiculed after a match between Bahia and Flamengo when the center back's blatant simulation earned him a second yellow card in the thirtieth minute. Afterwards many internet memes and videos sprang up poking fun of Fonseca's dive.

== Career statistics ==
As of 25 October 2021

Club	Season	League			State League		Cup		Continental		Other		Total	
Club	Season	Division	Apps	Goals	Apps	Goals	Apps	Goals	Apps	Goals	Apps	Goals	Apps	Goals
Brasilis	2008	Paulista 2ª Divisão	—		0	0	—		—		—		0	0
Lemense	2009	Paulista 2ª Divisão	—		22	0	—		—		—		22	0
União São João	2010	Paulista A2	—		13	0	—		—		—		13	0
União São João	2011	Paulista A2	—		6	0	—		—		—		6	0
União São João	Total		—		19	0	—		—		—		19	0
Guarani	2011	Série B	6	0	—		—		—		—		6	0
Mogi Mirim	2012	Série D	0	0	22	0	—		—		—		22	0
Mogi Mirim	2013	Série C	0	0	19	0	—		—		—		19	0
Mogi Mirim	Total		0	0	41	0	—		—		—		41	0
Bahia (loan)	2012	Série A	10	0	—		—		—		—		10	0
Bahia	2013	Série A	29	0	—		—		—		—		29	0
Bahia	2014	Série A	22	0	6	0	1	0	3 (Note: Appearance(s) in Copa Sudamericana)	1	6 (Note: Appearance(s) in Copa do Nordeste)	0	38	1
Bahia	Total		61	0	6	0	1	0	3	1	6	0	77	1
Tianjin Teda	2015	Chinese Super League	25	0	—		1	0	—		—		26	0
Bahia	2016	Série B	17	0	3	0	1	0	—		4	0	25	0
Bahia	2017	Série A	26	0	14	1	1	0	—		6	0	47	1
Bahia	2018	Série A	33	1	9	0	4	0	5	0	10	0	61	1
Bahia	2019	Série A	35	0	7	0	9	0	2	0	7	0	60	0
Bahia	2020	Série A	19	0	1	0	1	0	4	0	10	0	35	0
Bahia	2021	Série A	3	0	0	0	1	0	1	0	7	0	12	0
Bahia	Total		133	1	34	1	17	0	12	0	44	0	240	2
Career total			225	1	122	1	19	1	15	1	50	0	431	3

== Honours ==
Bahia

- Copa do Nordeste: 2017, 2021
- Campeonato Baiano: 2014, 2018, 2019, 2020
