= List of state highways in Minas Gerais =

This is a list of the state highways in Minas Gerais, Brazil.

== State highways (MG) ==
=== Radial highways ===
Number	Length (mi)	Length (km)	Southern or western terminus	Northern or eastern terminus	Formed	Removed	Notes
MG-010	—	—	—	—	—	—	
MG-020	—	—	—	—	—	—	
MG-030	—	—	—	—	—	—	
MG-040	—	—	—	—	—	—	
MG-050	—	—	—	—	—	—	
MG-060	—	—	—	—	—	—	

=== North-south highways ===
Number	Length (mi)	Length (km)	Southern or western terminus	Northern or eastern terminus	Formed	Removed	Notes
MG-105	—	—	—	—	—	—	
MG-108	—	—	—	—	—	—	
MG-111	—	—	—	—	—	—	
MG-114	—	—	—	—	—	—	
MG-117	—	—	—	—	—	—	
MG-120	—	—	—	—	—	—	
MG-122	—	—	—	—	—	—	
MG-123	—	—	—	—	—	—	
MG-124	—	—	—	—	—	—	
MG-126	—	—	—	—	—	—	
MG-129	—	—	—	—	—	—	
MG-132	—	—	—	—	—	—	
MG-133	—	—	—	—	—	—	
MG-135	—	—	—	—	—	—	
MG-153	—	—	—	—	—	—	
MG-155	—	—	—	—	—	—	
MG-158	—	—	—	—	—	—	
MG-161	—	—	—	—	—	—	
MG-164	—	—	—	—	—	—	
MG-167	—	—	—	—	—	—	
MG-170	—	—	—	—	—	—	
MG-173	—	—	—	—	—	—	
MG-176	—	—	—	—	—	—	
MG-179	—	—	—	—	—	—	
MG-181	—	—	—	—	—	—	
MG-184	—	—	—	—	—	—	
MG-187	—	—	—	—	—	—	
MG-188	—	—	—	—	—	—	
MG-190	—	—	—	—	—	—	

=== East-west highways ===
Number	Length (mi)	Length (km)	Southern or western terminus	Northern or eastern terminus	Formed	Removed	Notes
MG-202	—	—	—	—	—	—	
MG-205	—	—	—	—	—	—	
MG-208	—	—	—	—	—	—	
MG-211	—	—	—	—	—	—	
MG-214	—	—	—	—	—	—	
MG-217	—	—	—	—	—	—	
MG-220	—	—	—	—	—	—	
MG-223	—	—	—	—	—	—	
MG-226	—	—	—	—	—	—	
MG-229	—	—	—	—	—	—	
MG-230	—	—	—	—	—	—	
MG-231	—	—	—	—	—	—	
MG-232	—	—	—	—	—	—	
MG-235	—	—	—	—	—	—	
MG-238	—	—	—	—	—	—	
MG-252	—	—	—	—	—	—	
MG-255	—	—	—	—	—	—	
MG-259	—	—	—	—	—	—	
MG-260	—	—	—	—	—	—	
MG-262	—	—	—	—	—	—	
MG-265	—	—	—	—	—	—	
MG-270	—	—	—	—	—	—	
MG-275	—	—	—	—	—	—	
MG-280	—	—	—	—	—	—	
MG-285	—	—	—	—	—	—	
MG-290	—	—	—	—	—	—	
MG-295	—	—	—	—	—	—	

=== Diagonal highways ===
Number	Length (mi)	Length (km)	Southern or western terminus	Northern or eastern terminus	Formed	Removed	Notes
MG-305	—	—	—	—	—	—	
MG-307	—	—	—	—	—	—	
MG-308	—	—	—	—	—	—	
MG-311	—	—	—	—	—	—	
MG-314	—	—	—	—	—	—	
MG-317	—	—	—	—	—	—	
MG-320	—	—	—	—	—	—	
MG-323	—	—	—	—	—	—	
MG-326	—	—	—	—	—	—	
MG-328	—	—	—	—	—	—	
MG-329	—	—	—	—	—	—	
MG-332	—	—	—	—	—	—	
MG-335	—	—	—	—	—	—	
MG-338	—	—	—	—	—	—	
MG-341	—	—	—	—	—	—	
MG-342	—	—	—	—	—	—	
MG-344	—	—	—	—	—	—	
MG-347	—	—	—	—	—	—	
MG-350	—	—	—	—	—	—	
MG-353	—	—	—	—	—	—	

=== Link highways ===
Number	Length (mi)	Length (km)	Southern or western terminus	Northern or eastern terminus	Formed	Removed	Notes
MG-400	—	—	—	—	—	—	
MG-401	—	—	—	—	—	—	
MG-402	—	—	—	—	—	—	
MG-403	—	—	—	—	—	—	
MG-404	—	—	—	—	—	—	
MG-405	—	—	—	—	—	—	
MG-406	—	—	—	—	—	—	
MG-407	—	—	—	—	—	—	
MG-408	—	—	—	—	—	—	
MG-409	—	—	—	—	—	—	
MG-410	—	—	—	—	—	—	
MG-411	—	—	—	—	—	—	
MG-412	—	—	—	—	—	—	
MG-413	—	—	—	—	—	—	
MG-414	—	—	—	—	—	—	
MG-415	—	—	—	—	—	—	
MG-416	—	—	—	—	—	—	
MG-417	—	—	—	—	—	—	
MG-418	—	—	—	—	—	—	
MG-419	—	—	—	—	—	—	
MG-420	—	—	—	—	—	—	
MG-421	—	—	—	—	—	—	
MG-422	—	—	—	—	—	—	
MG-423	—	—	—	—	—	—	
MG-424	—	—	—	—	—	—	
MG-425	—	—	—	—	—	—	
MG-426	—	—	—	—	—	—	
MG-427	—	—	—	—	—	—	
MG-428	—	—	—	—	—	—	
MG-429	—	—	—	—	—	—	
MG-430	—	—	—	—	—	—	
MG-431	—	—	—	—	—	—	
MG-432	—	—	—	—	—	—	
MG-433	—	—	—	—	—	—	
MG-434	—	—	—	—	—	—	
MG-435	—	—	—	—	—	—	
MG-436	—	—	—	—	—	—	
MG-437	—	—	—	—	—	—	
MG-438	—	—	—	—	—	—	
MG-439	—	—	—	—	—	—	
MG-440	—	—	—	—	—	—	
MG-441	—	—	—	—	—	—	
MG-442	—	—	—	—	—	—	
MG-443	—	—	—	—	—	—	
MG-444	—	—	—	—	—	—	
MG-445	—	—	—	—	—	—	
MG-446	—	—	—	—	—	—	
MG-447	—	—	—	—	—	—	
MG-448	—	—	—	—	—	—	
MG-449	—	—	—	—	—	—	
MG-450	—	—	—	—	—	—	
MG-451	—	—	—	—	—	—	
MG-452	—	—	—	—	—	—	
MG-453	—	—	—	—	—	—	
MG-454	—	—	—	—	—	—	
MG-455	—	—	—	—	—	—	
MG-456	—	—	—	—	—	—	
MG-457	—	—	—	—	—	—	
MG-458	—	—	—	—	—	—	
MG-459	—	—	—	—	—	—	
MG-460	—	—	—	—	—	—	
MG-461	—	—	—	—	—	—	
MG-462	—	—	—	—	—	—	
MG-463	—	—	—	—	—	—	
MG-464	—	—	—	—	—	—	
MG-497	—	—	—	—	—	—	
MG-810	—	—	—	—	—	—	

== Local Link Highways (LMGs) ==
- LMG-601
- LMG-602
- LMG-603
- LMG-604
- LMG-605
- LMG-610 [pt]
- LMG-614
- LMG-615
- LMG-618
- LMG-622
- LMG-623
- LMG-624
- LMG-625
- LMG-626
- LMG-627
- LMG-628
- LMG-629
- LMG-630
- LMG-631
- LMG-632
- LMG-633
- LMG-634
- LMG-635
- LMG-638
- LMG-642
- LMG-644
- LMG-646
- LMG-650
- LMG-651
- LMG-652
- LMG-653
- LMG-654
- LMG-655
- LMG-656
- LMG-657
- LMG-658
- LMG-660
- LMG-662
- LMG-664
- LMG-666
- LMG-667
- LMG-670
- LMG-673
- LMG-674
- LMG-676
- LMG-677
- LMG-678
- LMG-679
- LMG-680
- LMG-682
- LMG-686
- LMG-690
- LMG-698
- LMG-702
- LMG-706
- LMG-710
- LMG-713
- LMG-714
- LMG-718
- LMG-719
- LMG-720
- LMG-721
- LMG-722
- LMG-723
- LMG-726
- LMG-728
- LMG-729
- LMG-730
- LMG-731
- LMG-732
- LMG-733
- LMG-734
- LMG-735
- LMG-736
- LMG-737
- LMG-738
- LMG-739
- LMG-740
- LMG-741
- LMG-742
- LMG-743
- LMG-744
- LMG-745
- LMG-746
- LMG-747
- LMG-748
- LMG-749
- LMG-750
- LMG-752
- LMG-754
- LMG-758 [pt]
- LMG-759 [pt]
- LMG-760 [pt]
- LMG-762
- LMG-764
- LMG-766
- LMG-773
- LMG-774
- LMG-775
- LMG-776
- LMG-777
- LMG-778
- LMG-779
- LMG-780
- LMG-782
- LMG-788
- LMG-789
- LMG-790
- LMG-793
- LMG-794
- LMG-795
- LMG-796
- LMG-798
- LMG-800
- LMG-801
- LMG-804
- LMG-805
- LMG-806 [pt]
- LMG-807
- LMG-808
- LMG-809
- LMG-810
- LMG-812
- LMG-813
- LMG-814
- LMG-815
- LMG-816
- LMG-818
- LMG-819
- LMG-820
- LMG-821
- LMG-822
- LMG-823
- LMG-824
- LMG-825
- LMG-826
- LMG-827
- LMG-828
- LMG-829
- LMG-830
- LMG-831
- LMG-832
- LMG-833
- LMG-834
- LMG-836
- LMG-837
- LMG-838
- LMG-839
- LMG-840
- LMG-841
- LMG-842
- LMG-843
- LMG-844
- LMG-845
- LMG-846
- LMG-847
- LMG-849
- LMG-850
- LMG-856
- LMG-857
- LMG-858
- LMG-860
- LMG-862
- LMG-863
- LMG-864
- LMG-865
- LMG-866
- LMG-867
- LMG-868
- LMG-870
- LMG-871
- LMG-872
- LMG-874
- LMG-877
- LMG-878
- LMG-879
- LMG-880
- LMG-881
- LMG-882
- LMG-883
- LMG-884
- LMG-886
- LMG-891
- LMG-893

== Access highways (AMGs) ==
- AMG-0105
- AMG-0115
- AMG-0130
- AMG-0140
- AMG-0145
- AMG-0150
- AMG-0155
- AMG-0160
- AMG-0165
- AMG-0205
- AMG-0210
- AMG-0215
- AMG-0220
- AMG-0305
- AMG-0310
- AMG-0315
- AMG-0320
- AMG-0325
- AMG-0330
- AMG-0335
- AMG-0340
- AMG-0345
- AMG-0350
- AMG-0360
- AMG-0365
- AMG-0405
- AMG-0415
- AMG-0420
- AMG-0430
- AMG-0435
- AMG-0445
- AMG-0450 [pt]
- AMG-0455
- AMG-0460
- AMG-0465
- AMG-0470
- AMG-0475
- AMG-0505 [pt]
- AMG-0510 [pt]
- AMG-0515
- AMG-0520 [pt]
- AMG-0525
- AMG-0540
- AMG-0545
- AMG-0550
- AMG-0620
- AMG-0625
- AMG-0630
- AMG-0635
- AMG-0640
- AMG-0705
- AMG-0710
- AMG-0715
- AMG-0720
- AMG-0725
- AMG-0805
- AMG-0810
- AMG-0815
- AMG-0820
- AMG-0905
- AMG-0910
- AMG-0920
- AMG-0925
- AMG-0930
- AMG-0935
- AMG-1005
- AMG-1010
- AMG-1015
- AMG-1020 [pt]
- AMG-1025
- AMG-1030 [pt]
- AMG-1035 [pt]
- AMG-1040 [pt]
- AMG-1045 [pt]
- AMG-1050
- AMG-1055
- AMG-1105
- AMG-1110
- AMG-1115
- AMG-1205
- AMG-1210
- AMG-1215
- AMG-1220
- AMG-1225
- AMG-1230
- AMG-1235
- AMG-1240
- AMG-1305
- AMG-1310
- AMG-1405
- AMG-1410
- AMG-1415
- AMG-1420
- AMG-1505 [pt]
- AMG-1515
- AMG-1520
- AMG-1530
- AMG-1535
- AMG-1540
- AMG-1545
- AMG-1550
- AMG-1555 [pt]
- AMG-1560
- AMG-1605
- AMG-1615
- AMG-1625
- AMG-1630
- AMG-1635
- AMG-1640
- AMG-1645
- AMG-1650
- AMG-1655
- AMG-1660
- AMG-1665
- AMG-1705
- AMG-1710
- AMG-1715
- AMG-1720
- AMG-1725
- AMG-1730
- AMG-1735
- AMG-1740
- AMG-1745
- AMG-1750 [pt]
- AMG-1755
- AMG-1760
- AMG-1765
- AMG-1770
- AMG-1805
- AMG-1810
- AMG-1815
- AMG-1820
- AMG-1825
- AMG-1835
- AMG-1905 [pt]
- AMG-1910
- AMG-1915 [pt]
- AMG-1920 [pt]
- AMG-1925 [pt]
- AMG-1930 [pt]
- AMG-1935
- AMG-2005
- AMG-2010
- AMG-2015
- AMG-2025
- AMG-2030
- AMG-2035
- AMG-2040
- AMG-2045
- AMG-2105
- AMG-2205
- AMG-2210
- AMG-2215
- AMG-2305
- AMG-2310
- AMG-2315
- AMG-2320
- AMG-2325
- AMG-2405
- AMG-2410
- AMG-2415
- AMG-2420
- AMG-2425
- AMG-2435
- AMG-2440
- AMG-2505
- AMG-2510
- AMG-2515
- AMG-2520
- AMG-2525
- AMG-2530
- AMG-2535
- AMG-2540
- AMG-2545
- AMG-2550
- AMG-2555
- AMG-2560
- AMG-2570
- AMG-2605
- AMG-2610
- AMG-2615
- AMG-2620
- AMG-2625
- AMG-2810
- AMG-2815
- AMG-2901
- AMG-2902
- AMG-2903
- AMG-2904
- AMG-2905
- AMG-2906
- AMG-2910
- AMG-2915
- AMG-2920
- AMG-2925
- AMG-2930
- AMG-2935
- AMG-2945
- AMG-2955
- AMG-2960
- AMG-2965
- AMG-2970
- AMG-2975
- AMG-2980
- AMG-2985
- AMG-2990
- AMG-2995
- AMG-3005
- AMG-3010
- AMG-3015
- AMG-3020
- AMG-3030
- AMG-3035 [pt]
- AMG-3040 [pt]
- AMG-3050
- AMG-3055
- AMG-3060
- AMG-3065
- AMG-3070
- AMG-3075
- AMG-3080
- AMG-3085
- AMG-3105
- AMG-3110
- AMG-3115
- AMG-3120
- AMG-3205
- AMG-3210
- AMG-3215
- AMG-3220
- AMG-3225
- AMG-3305
- AMG-3310
- AMG-3315
- AMG-3320
- AMG-3325
- AMG-3405
- AMG-3410
- AMG-3505
- AMG-3510
- AMG-3525
- AMG-3805
- AMG-3905
- AMG-4005
- AMG-4010
- AMG-4015
- AMG-4020
- AMG-4025
- AMG-4030

== Coincident Highways (MGCs) ==
- MGC-120
- MGC-262
- MGC-356
- MGC-369
- MGC-383
- MGC-452
- MGC-455
- MGC-482
- MGC-497

== Temporary Highways (MGTs) ==
- MGT-122
- MGT-154
- MGT-251
- MGT-259
- MGT-354
- MGT-383
- MGT-479
- MGT-482

== Elói Mendes Highways (EM) ==
- EM-015
- EM-025
- EM-026
- EM-030
- EM-060
- EM-070
- EM-080
- EM-090
- EM-460
- EM-467
