= Maria da Fé =

- Municipality
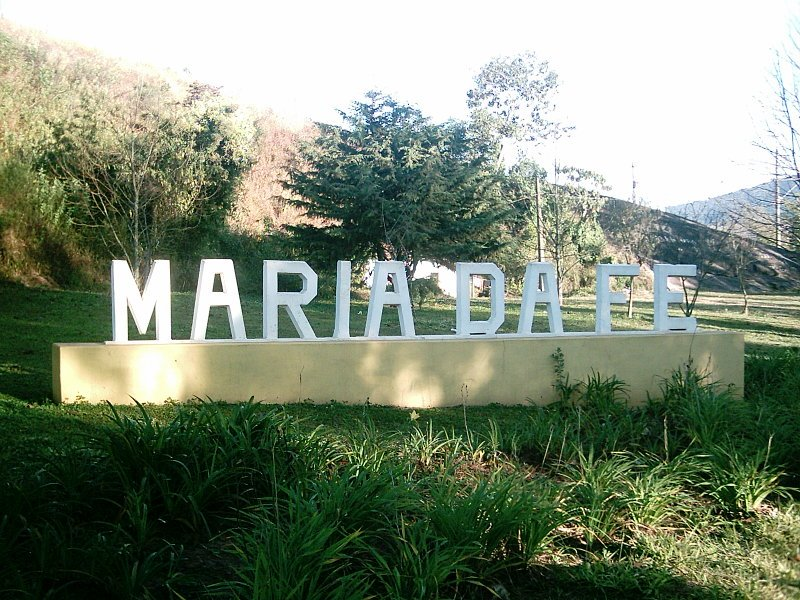
- Maria da Fé sign

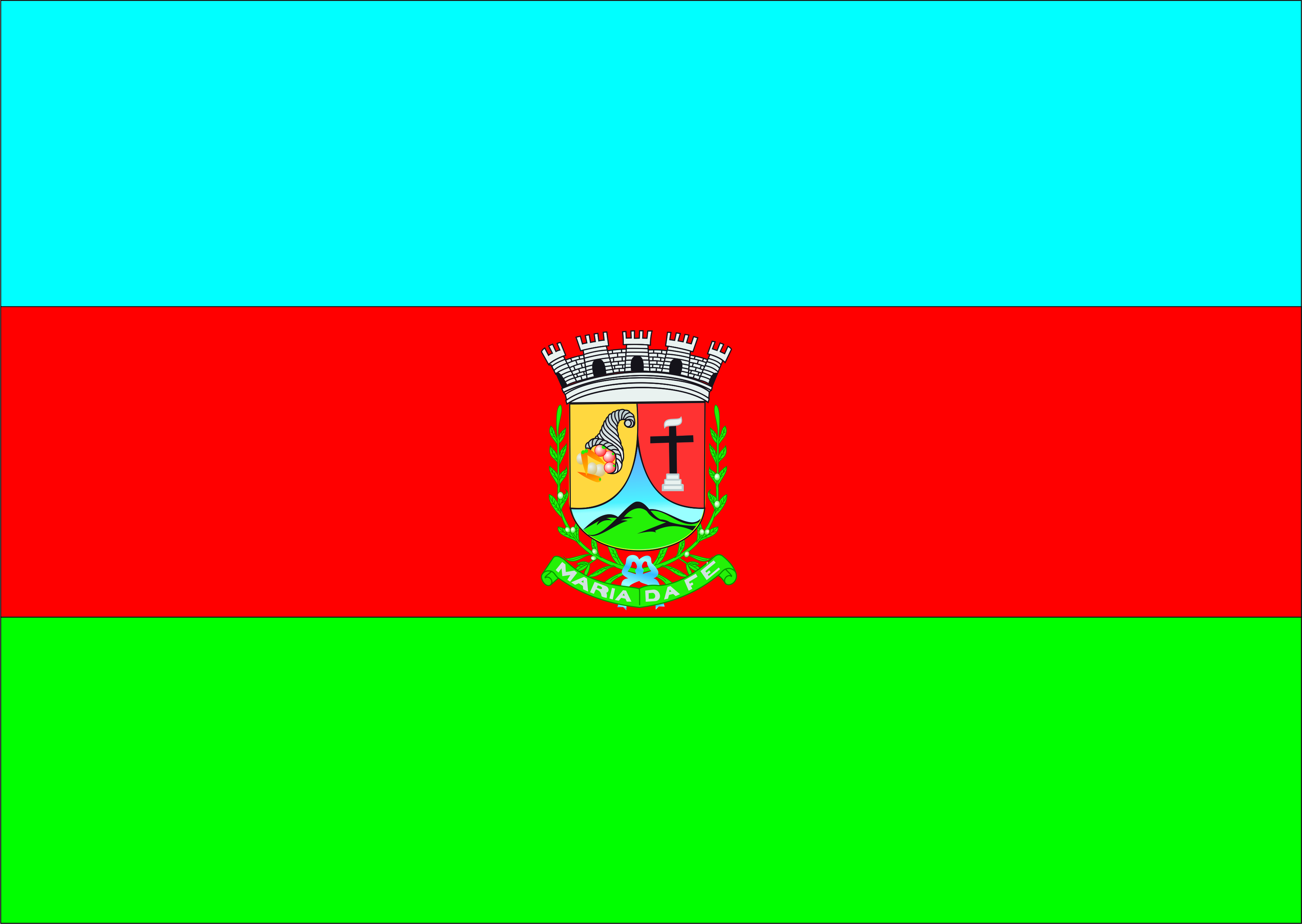
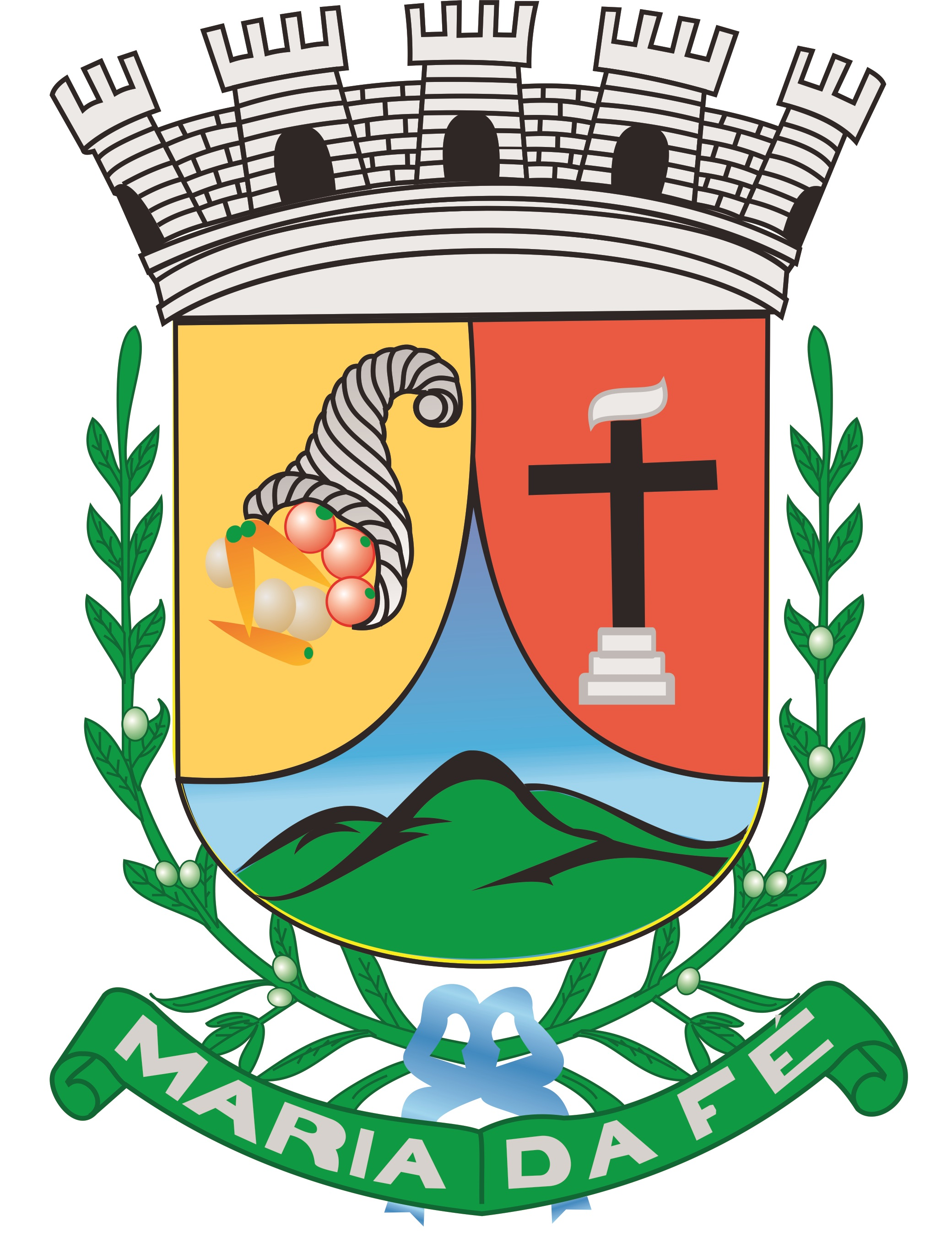
- Flag Coat of arms

- Location in the State of Minas Gerais
- Coordinates: 22°18′28″S 45°22′30″W
- Country: Brazil
- Region: Southeast
- State: Minas Gerais
- Founded: June 1, 1912

Government
  - Mayor: Patricia Santos de Almeida Bernardo (PSD)

Area
  - Total: 203.774 km^{2} (78.678 sq mi)
- Elevation: 1,258 m (4,127 ft)

Population (2020)
  - Total: 14,056
  - Density: 75.2/km^{2} (195/sq mi)
- Time zone: UTC−3 (BRT)
- Postal Code: 37517-000
- Website: Maria da Fé, Minas Gerais

Maria da Fé is a Brazilian municipality located in the state of Minas Gerais. Its population as of 2020 is estimated to be 14,056 people. The area of the municipality is 203.774 km^{2}. The city belongs to the mesoregion South/South-West of Minas Gerais and to the microregion of Itajubá.

== Geography ==
=== Climate ===
Maria da Fé is located in the dominant mesothermic climates in the southeast and south of Brazil, associated with its altitude. The city features a temperate oceanic climate (Köppen: Cfb) as well as Campos do Jordão. The average temperature is 17 °C (maximum average 23.3 °C and minimum average of 10.1 °C), with warm summers but not as hot as places in valleys in the interior of the country and the winters are colds to Brazil and Minas Gerais. The total precipitation is 1738 mm. It is the only city in the state where the average temperature rise trend per decade reaches 1 °C. Being in the Mantiqueira Mountains, frost is a common event in normal winter. It can go from 10 occasions in several years.

The city is one of the coldest of Minas Gerais and Brazil. According to data from the National Institute of Meteorology (INMET), referring to the period between 1976 and 2016, the lowest temperature recorded in Maria da Fé was -8.4 °C on July 21, 1981, and the highest reached 34,4 °C on January 19, 2015. The largest accumulated rainfall in 24 hours reached 173 mm (mm) on January 3, 2000. Other large accumulations equal or greater than 100 mm were 125 mm on October 14, 1995, 103.4 mm on November 26, 2006, and 100.2 mm on February 25, 1995. The lowest relative humidity index reached 15% in the afternoon of August 20, 2005. In recent records there were years like 2013 where there were 23 nights with frost but the following year only 3 days, but varies considerably from year to year going from a few days to more than a dozen. The average of the first frost is on May 18 and the last on August 14, and may occur from early April until the end of September.

Climate data for Maria da Fé (Downtown), elevation: 1276 m or 4186.4 ft, 1981-2010 normals, (Note: Mean monthly maxima and minima (i.e. the expected highest and lowest temperature readings at any point during the year or given month) calculated based on data at said location from 1981 to 2010.) extremes for 1976-present
Month	Jan	Feb	Mar	Apr	May	Jun	Jul	Aug	Sep	Oct	Nov	Dec	Year
Record high °C (°F)	34.4 (93.9)	32.6 (90.7)	31 (88)	30.6 (87.1)	29.6 (85.3)	27.6 (81.7)	27.9 (82.2)	29.7 (85.5)	32.4 (90.3)	34 (93)	32.4 (90.3)	32.6 (90.7)	34.4 (93.9)
Mean daily maximum °C (°F)	25.9 (78.6)	26.6 (79.9)	25.8 (78.4)	24.6 (76.3)	22.1 (71.8)	21.2 (70.2)	21.6 (70.9)	23.5 (74.3)	24.3 (75.7)	25 (77)	25.5 (77.9)	25.5 (77.9)	24.3 (75.7)
Daily mean °C (°F)	19.9 (67.8)	19.9 (67.8)	19.2 (66.6)	17.3 (63.1)	14.4 (57.9)	12.7 (54.9)	13.1 (55.6)	14.1 (57.4)	16.4 (61.5)	18.1 (64.6)	18.8 (65.8)	19.4 (66.9)	16.9 (62.4)
Mean daily minimum °C (°F)	15.2 (59.4)	14.7 (58.5)	14 (57)	11.4 (52.5)	8.1 (46.6)	6.5 (43.7)	6.3 (43.3)	7.1 (44.8)	10.4 (50.7)	12.6 (54.7)	13.6 (56.5)	14.8 (58.6)	11.2 (52.2)
Record low °C (°F)	3.6 (38.5)	5.2 (41.4)	3 (37)	0.6 (33.1)	−5.2 (22.6)	−4.2 (24.4)	−8.4 (16.9)	−8 (18)	−0.4 (31.3)	−0.4 (31.3)	1.4 (34.5)	3 (37)	−8.4 (16.9)
Average precipitation mm (inches)	295.3 (11.63)	196.3 (7.73)	175.2 (6.90)	83.2 (3.28)	76.3 (3.00)	42 (1.7)	32.5 (1.28)	32.4 (1.28)	93.6 (3.69)	139.2 (5.48)	197.7 (7.78)	283.4 (11.16)	1,647.1 (64.85)
Average precipitation days (≥ 1.0 mm (0.04 in))	18	14	14	7	5	4	3	3	7	11	14	18	118
Average relative humidity (%)	81.4	80.5	80.6	80.1	79.8	78.7	76.3	71.6	73	75.5	77.7	80.6	78
Mean monthly sunshine hours	148	161	176.8	184.1	191.9	194.6	216.4	233.1	184.8	186.3	169.6	146.6	2,193.2
Source: INMET

== Gallery ==
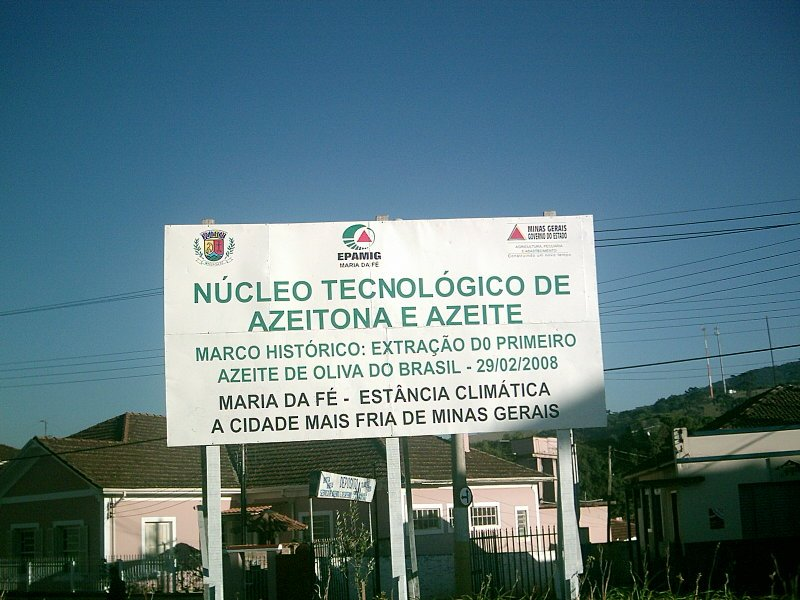
Maria da Fé olive oil project

== See also ==
- List of municipalities in Minas Gerais
