= MG-010 (Minas Gerais highway) =

Highway in Minas Gerais, Brazil

MG-010

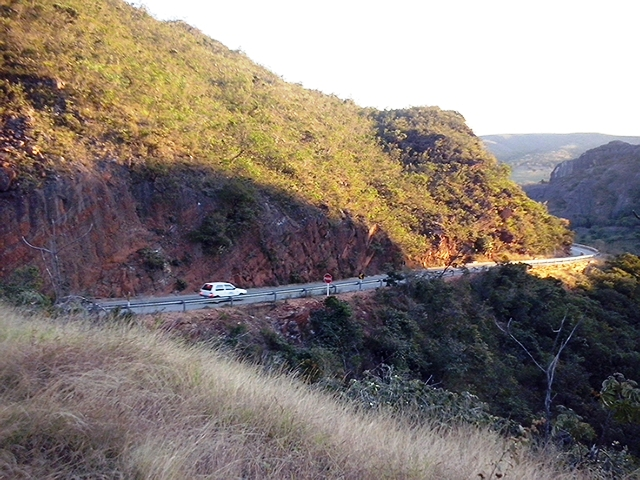
- MG-010 near Serra do Cipó

Route information
- Length: 307.9 km (191.3 mi)

Major junctions
- From: Belo Horizonte, Minas Gerais
- To: Rio Vermelho, Minas Gerais

Location
- Country: Brazil
- State: Minas Gerais

Highway system
- Highways in Brazil; Federal; Minas Gerais State Highways

MG-010 is a state highway in Minas Gerais, Brazil. Its total length is 307.9 kilometers. Its route starts in Belo Horizonte and ends in the municipality of Rio Vermelho. Since the construction of the Belo Horizonte International Airport, in the municipality of Confins, MG-010 has been a road of vital importance for the entire state of Minas Gerais. In mid-2005, the government launched the Green Line project, which consists of creating a modern corridor for Confins airport. Since then the MG-010 has undergone several modifications.

== Route ==
The highway connects the following municipalities:

- Belo Horizonte
- Vespasiano
- Lagoa Santa
- Jaboticatubas
- Santana do Riacho (in the district of Cardeal Mota)
- Conceição do Mato Dentro
- Serro
- Santo Antônio do Itambé
- Serra Azul de Minas
- Rio Vermelho
