= Olavo Bilac Pinto =

Brazilian politician

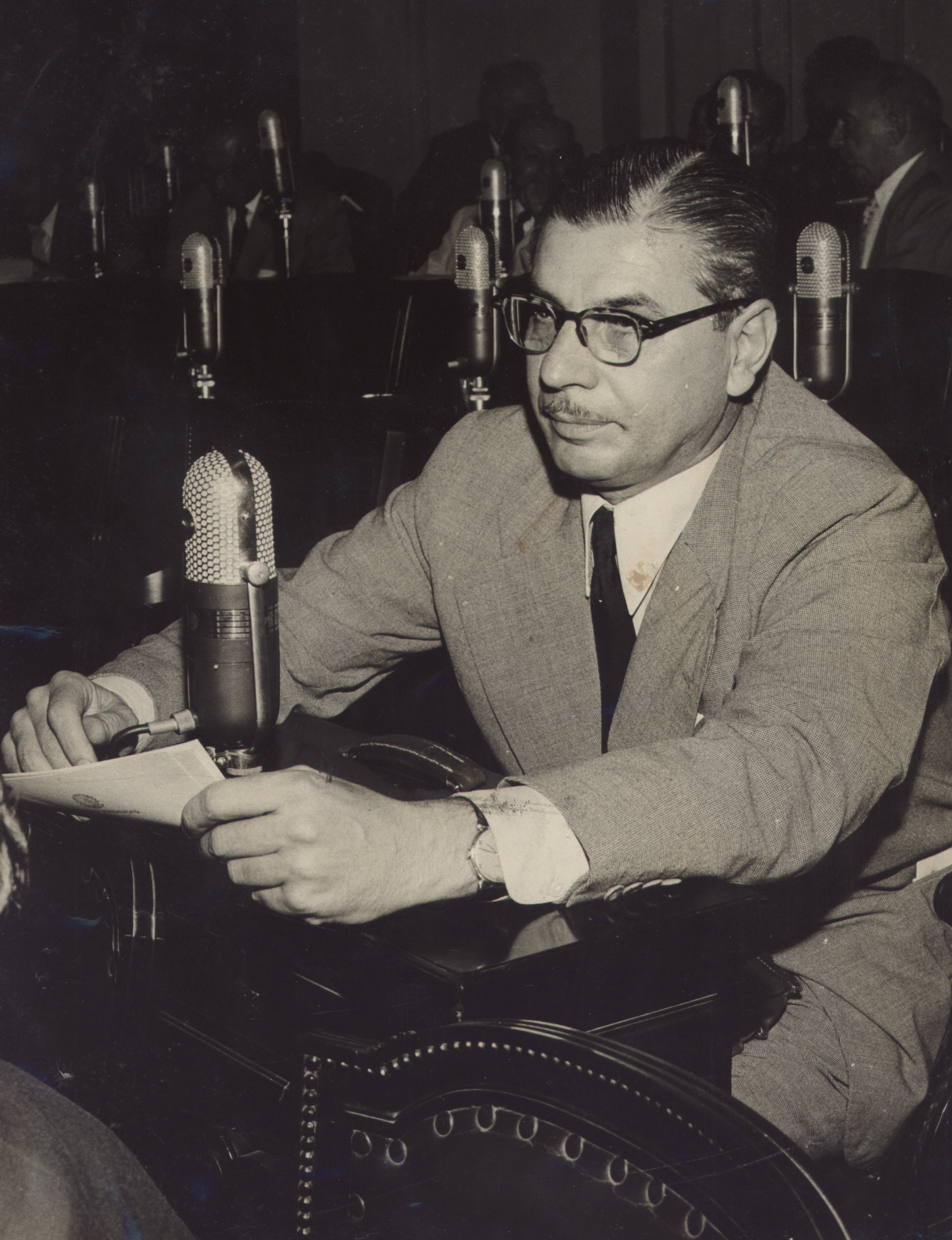
In 1957

Olavo Bilac Pereira Pinto (February 8, 1908 – April 18, 1985) was a Brazilian lawyer, politician, diplomat, and professor who served as President of the Chamber of Deputies from February 1965 to March 1966, ambassador of Brazil to France from 1966 to 1970, and Justice of the Supreme Federal Court 1970 to 1978. He was one of the main figures of the National Democratic Union during the Liberal Republic, serving as its president from 1963 to 1965.

== Biography ==
Born in Santa Rita do Sapucaí in the state of Minas Gerais, he came from a modest background. His father was the accountant João Pereira Pinto, an admirer of the poet Olavo Bilac, and his mother, Laura Pereira Pinto, was a housewife. He completed his secondary education at the Instituto Moderno de Educação e Ensino and then enrolled at the Faculty of Law of Minas Gerais, of whose student union he was president before graduating in 1929.

In 1930, as a member of the Mineiro Republican Party, he supported the presidential campaign of Getúlio Vargas launched by the Liberal Alliance. 1931, he began practicing as a criminal lawyer in Belo Horizonte, later working with administrative law. Following the Constitutionalist Revolution, he joined the Progressive Party, founded by Olegário Maciel, Venceslau Brás, and Antônio Carlos Ribeiro de Andrada. He was among the members of the 1933 Assembly that drafted the 1935 Minas Gerais Constitution, which was later revoked by the Estado Novo. In 1933, he became professor of Introduction to Law in the Department of Instruction of Minas Gerais Public Forces, and in 1939 he was appointed professor of Science of Finance at his alma mater. In 1943, he began teaching administrative law at the National Faculty of Law.

Bilac Pinto signed the Manifesto of the Mineiros, a letter denouncing the Estado Novo dictatorship authored by politicians, intellectuals, and artists. He was elected federal deputy for the UDN n 1951. In 1956, he proposed the creation of the Counsil for the Defence of Human Rights. Though opposed to Getúlio Vargas, he took part in the nationalist campaign O petróleo é nosso, contributing to the establishment of the Petrobras. He supported the 1964 military coup which ousted President João Goulart and joined the pro-dictatorship National Renewal Alliance. Backed by the President Humberto de Alencar Castelo Branco, he defeated Ranieri Mazzilli to preside the Chamber of Deputies. Castelo Branco, who had expressed his wish for the return of a civil government, considered Bilac Pinto as a possible successor to his presidency.

As Justice of the Supreme Federal Court, Bilac Pinto guided Francisco Rezek, his aide. In the 1980s, he drew closer to the democratic group led by Tancredo Neves in the Popular Party.
