= Federal University of Itajubá =

Federal public university in Itajubá, Minas Gerais, Brazil

Coordinates: 22°24′46″S 45°26′58″W

- Universidade Federal de Itajubá
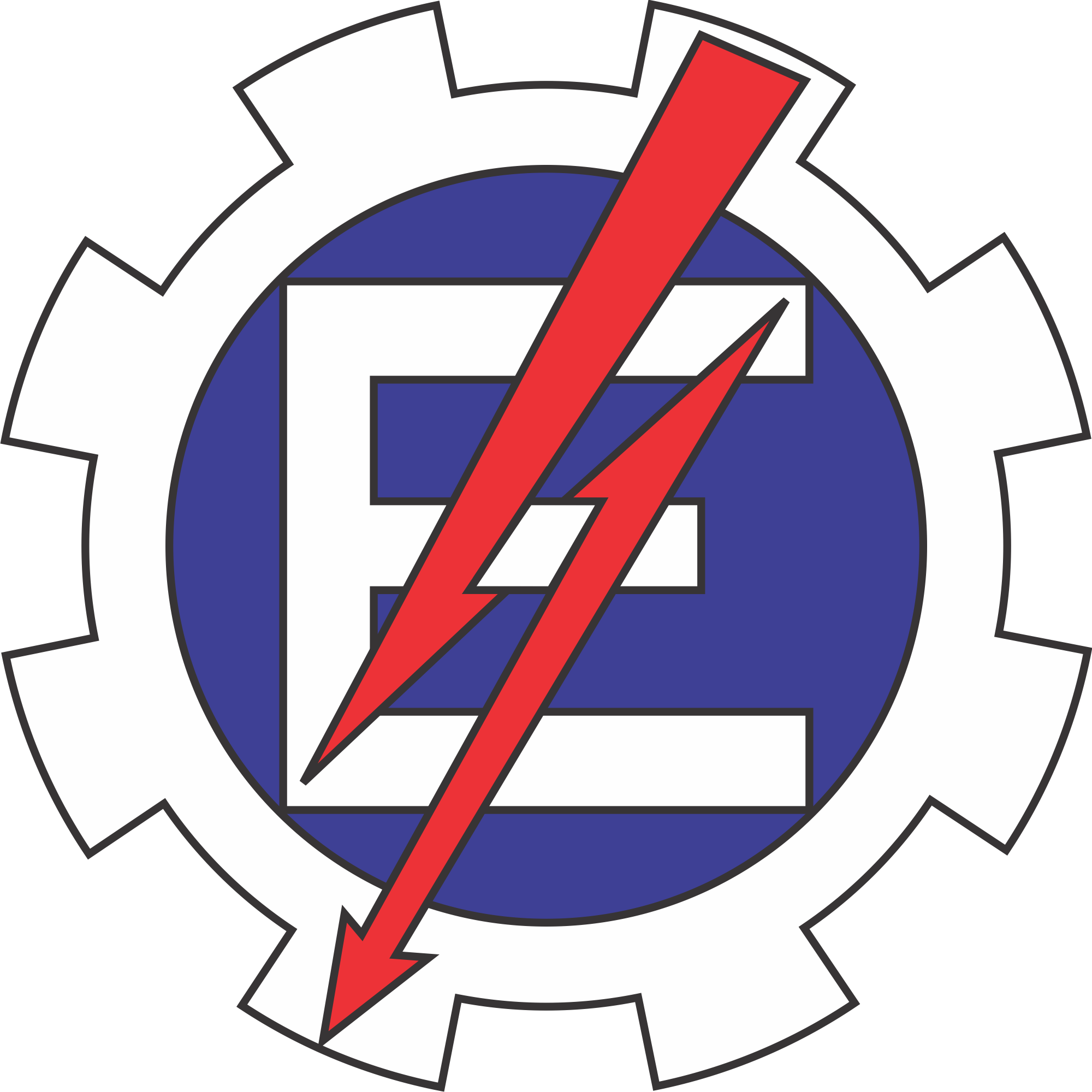
- Other name: UNIFEI
- Former name: Escola Federal de Engenharia de Itajubá (EFEI)
- Motto: "Revelemo-nos mais por atos do que por palavras, dignos de possuir este grande país"
- Type: Public
- Established: November 23, 1913
- Budget: R$ 142,773,689.00 (2011)
- Rector: Edson da Costa Bortoni
- Academic staff: 462 (2016)
- Administrative staff: 338 (2009)
- Undergraduates: 7,676 (2016)
- Postgraduates: 1,042 (2016)
- Location: Itajubá, Minas Gerais, Brazil
- Campus: Urban
- Website: www.unifei.edu.br

The Federal University of Itajubá (Portuguese: Universidade Federal de Itajubá, UNIFEI), formerly known as the Escola Federal de Engenharia de Itajubá (EFEI), is a federal public university located in Itajubá, in the state of Minas Gerais, Brazil. Founded in 1913, the institution is one of Brazil's oldest engineering-focused higher education institutions. UNIFEI offers undergraduate and postgraduate programs in engineering, technology, and applied sciences, with research activities in areas including electrical engineering, power systems, mechanical engineering, environmental engineering, materials engineering, automation and control, and computer engineering.

== History ==
The university was founded on November 23, 1913, as the Instituto Eletrotécnico e Mecânico de Itajubá (IEMI; English: Electrotechnical and Mechanical Institute of Itajubá). On April 16, 1968, the institution was renamed Escola Federal de Engenharia de Itajubá (EFEI).

In 2002, the institution obtained university status through Brazilian Federal Law No. 10,435 and adopted its current name, Universidade Federal de Itajubá, during the administration of former president Fernando Henrique Cardoso.

UNIFEI has historically specialized in engineering and technical education. The university participates in institutional evaluations conducted by Brazil's Ministry of Education (MEC), receiving high ratings in several assessment cycles. In the IGC/2011 evaluation conducted by the Ministry of Education, the university received the maximum institutional score of 5.

== Radio station ==
The university operates an AM radio station, Rádio Universitária 1570 kHz (ZYL-242), which has broadcast on the 1570 kHz frequency since 1961.

== International partnerships ==
The university maintains academic cooperation agreements with institutions in several countries, including Canada, France, Germany, India, Portugal, Spain, and the United States.

=== India ===
- Indian Institute of Technology Roorkee

=== Germany ===
- TU Dresden
- Otto Von Guericke Universität Magdeburg

=== Canada ===
- University of British Columbia
- University of Victoria
- University of Windsor

=== United States ===
- Washington State University

== See also ==
- Itajubá
- List of federal universities of Brazil
