= Ipuiúna =

Coordinates: 22°06′S 46°11′W

- Municipality
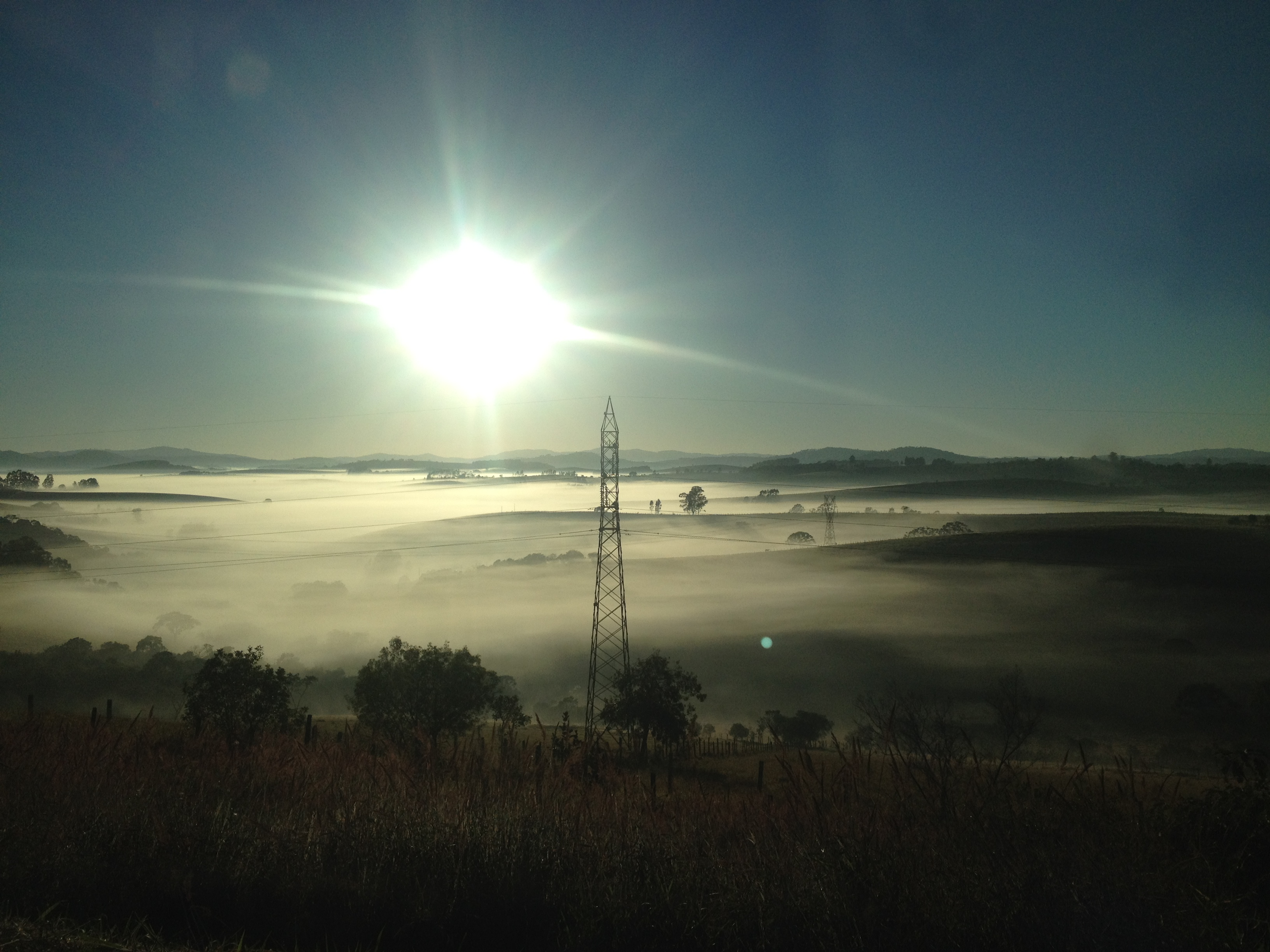

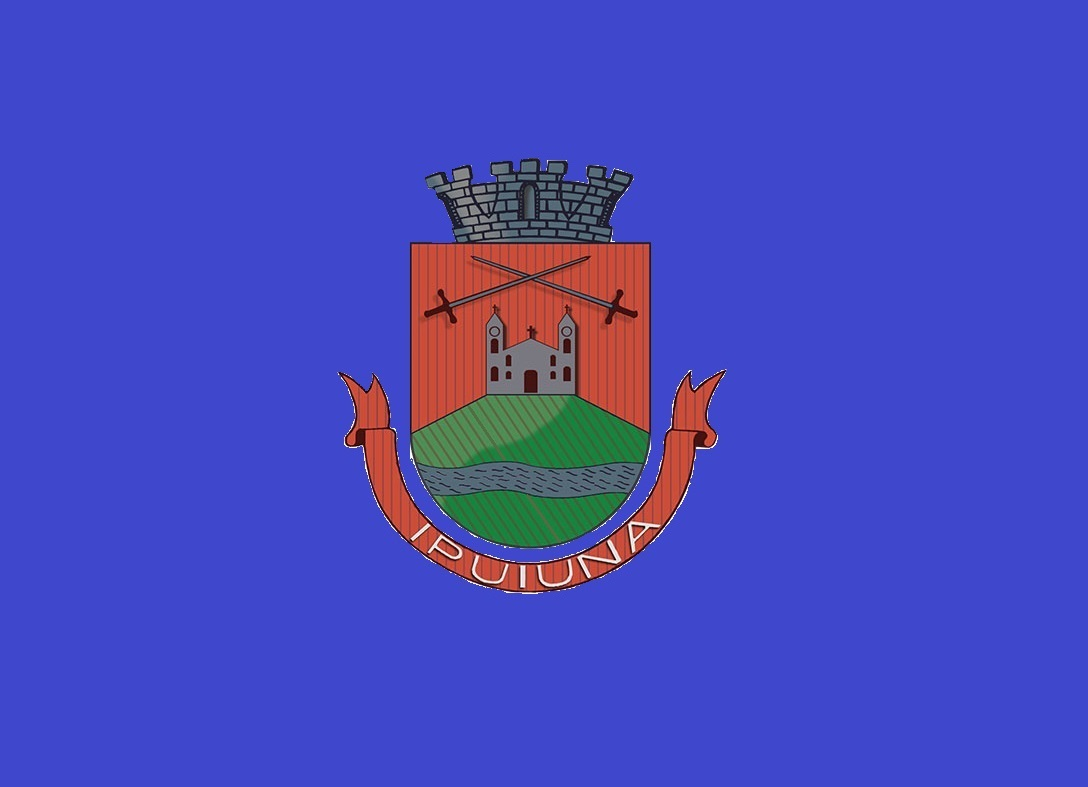
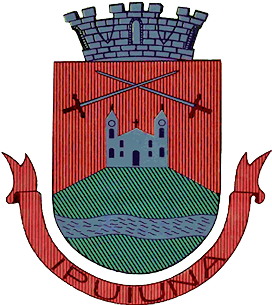
- Flag Coat of arms
- Interactive map of Ipuiúna
- Country: Brazil
- Region: Southeast
- State: Minas Gerais
- Mesoregion: Sud/Sudoeste de Minas
- Microregion: Pouso alegre
- Established: 2017-pre

Government
  - Major: Elder Cássio Oliva(PLLiberal Party (Brazil, 2006))

Area
  - Total: 115 sq mi (298 km^{2})

Population (2020)
  - Total: 10,118
  - Density: 8,790/sq mi (3,395/km^{2})
- Time zone: UTC−3 (BRT)

Ipuiúna is a municipality in the state of Minas Gerais in the Southeast region of Brazil.

== See also ==
- List of municipalities in Minas Gerais
