= Cachoeira de Minas =

Coordinates: 22.355°S 45.7789°W

- Municipality
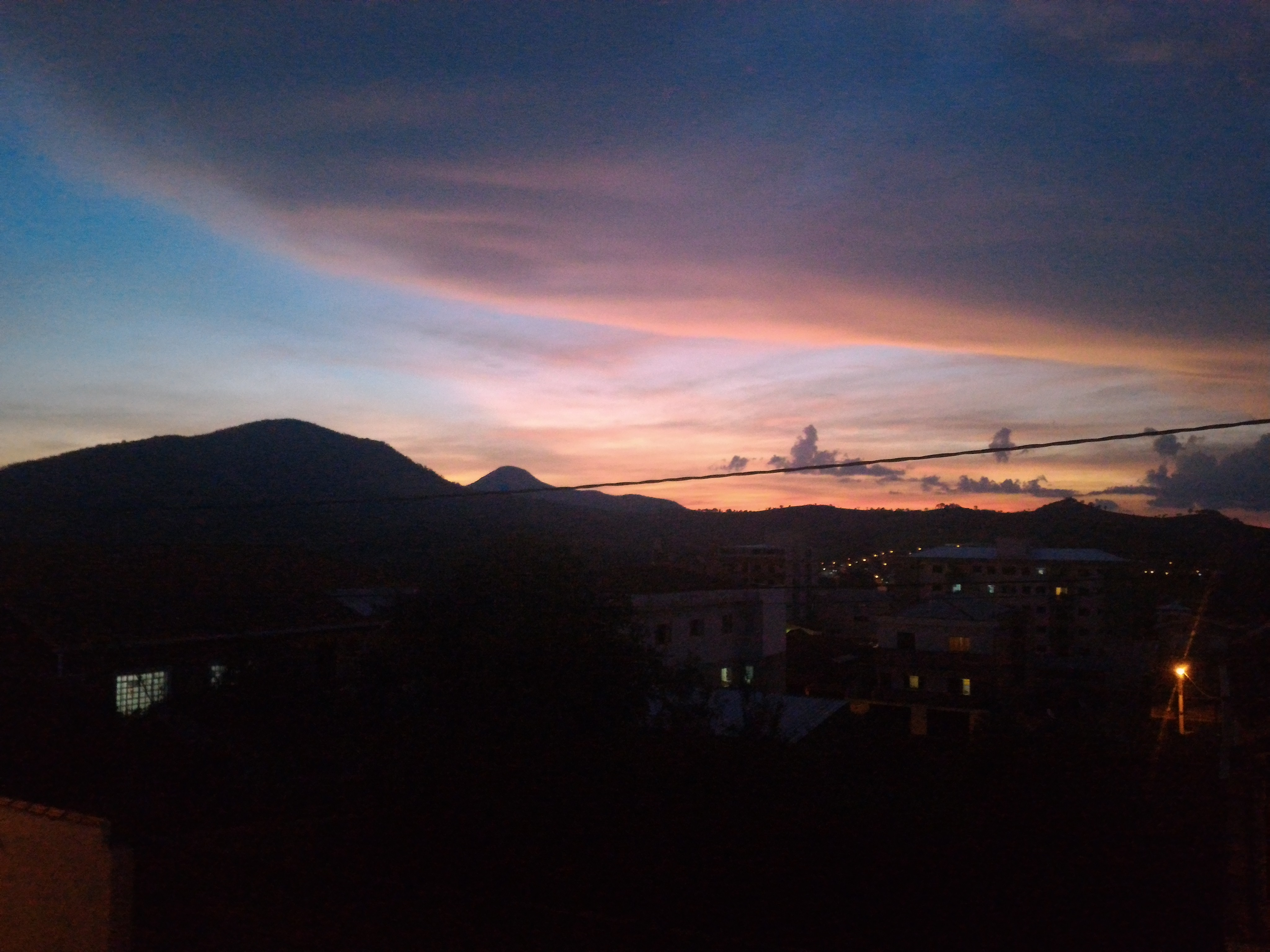

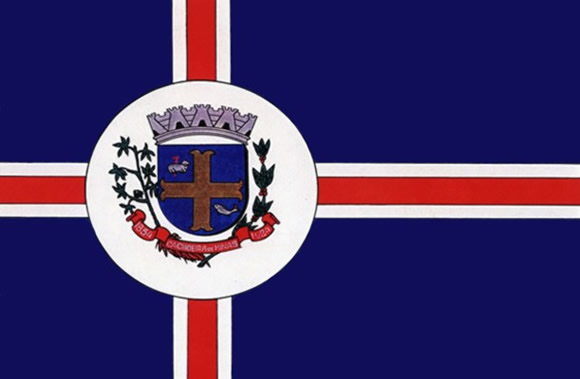
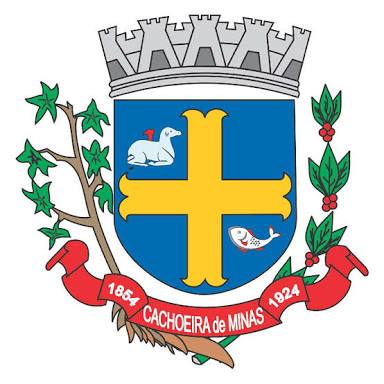
- Flag Coat of arms
- Interactive map of Cachoeira de Minas
- Country: Brazil
- Region: Southeast
- State: Minas Gerais
- Mesoregion: Sud/Sudoeste de Minas

Population (2020)
  - Total: 11,579
- Time zone: UTC−3 (BRT)

Cachoeira de Minas (translation: Minas' Waterfall) is a municipality in the state of Minas Gerais in the Southeast region of Brazil.

== See also ==
- List of municipalities in Minas Gerais
