= Santa Rita de Caldas =

- Municipality
- Coat of arms

- Location in Brazil
- Coordinates: 22°1′44″S 46°20′13″W
- Country: Brazil
- Region: Southeast
- State: Minas Gerais
- Mesoregion: Oeste de Minas

Population (2020)
  - Total: 8,924
- Time zone: UTC−3 (BRT)

Santa Rita de Caldas is a municipality in the state of Minas Gerais in the Southeast region of Brazil.

== See also ==
- List of municipalities in Minas Gerais
