= Congonhal =

Municipality in Southeast Brazil

Coordinates: 22.1528°S 46.0389°W

- Municipality
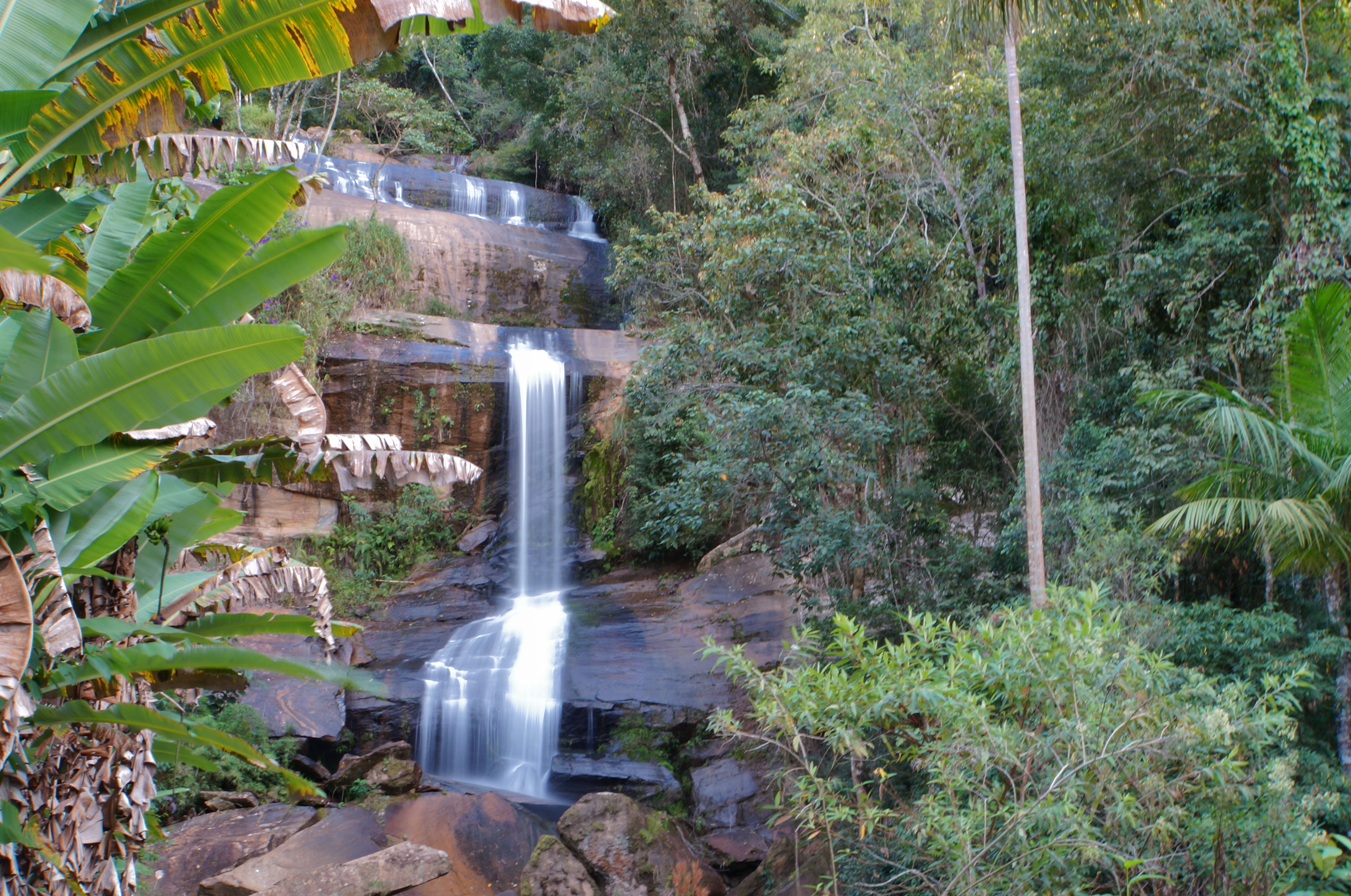

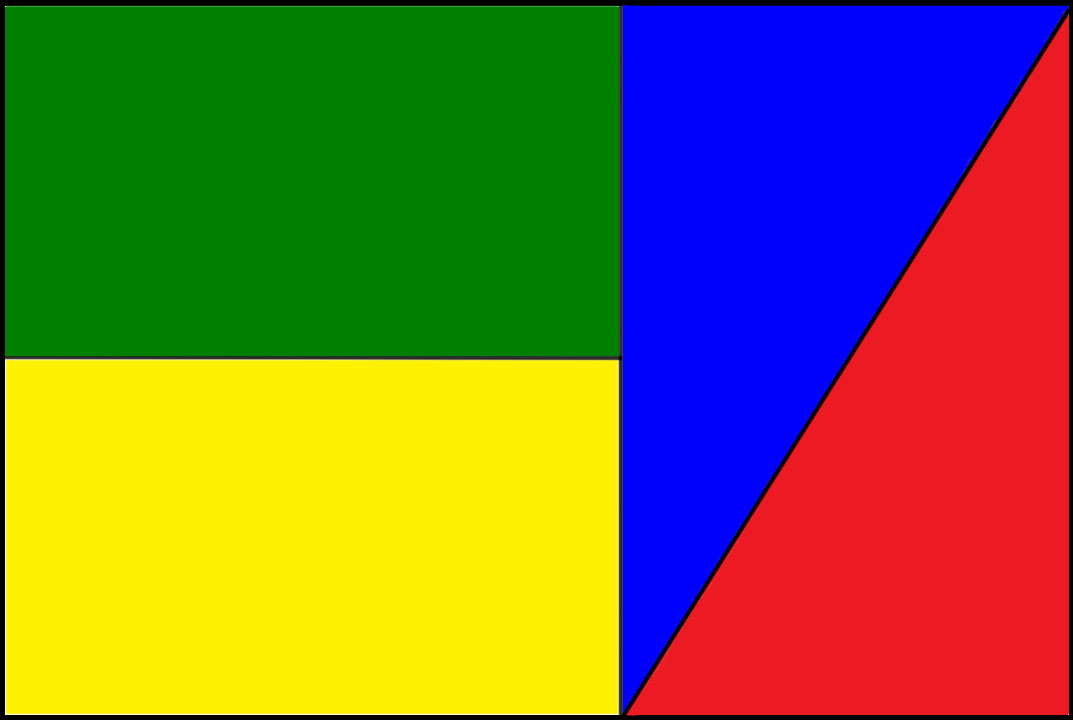
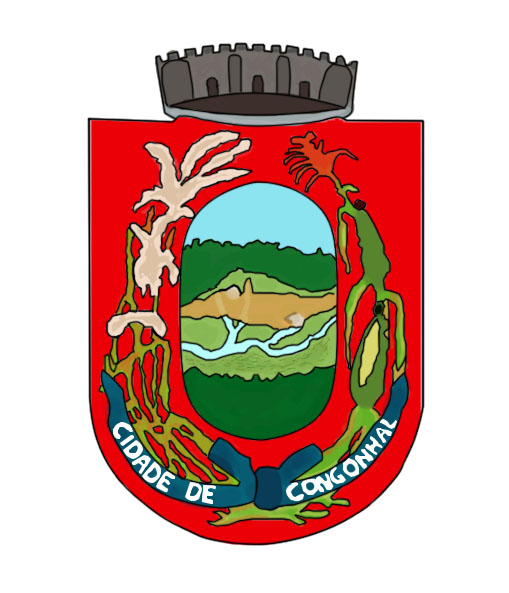
- Flag Coat of arms

- Location of Congonhal in Minas Gerais
- Country: Brazil
- Region: Southeast
- State: Minas Gerais
- Mesoregion: Sud/Sudoeste de Minas

Government
  - Mayor: Rubens Vilela dos Santos Junior (Republicans)

Area
  - Total: 79.199 sq mi (205.125 km^{2})
- Elevation: 2,828 ft (862 m)

Population (2020)
  - Total: 12,082
- Time zone: UTC−3 (BRT)

Congonhal is a municipality in the state of Minas Gerais in the Southeast region of Brazil. Its population in 2017 was of 11,706 inhabitants according to estimated data from IBGE.

== History ==
The beginning of historic occupation of the region where today is Congonhal and neighbor municipalities, goes back to the mid-eighteenth century, strongly driven by the discovery of gold in the mines of Alto Sapucaí. The city's settlement began in 1756 by paulistas and portugueses, when a bridge was constructed across a river. In 1880 the parish of San Jose was canonically instituted.

== See also ==
- List of municipalities in Minas Gerais
