= Cristina, Minas Gerais =

Cristina
- Municipality
- Municipality of Cristina
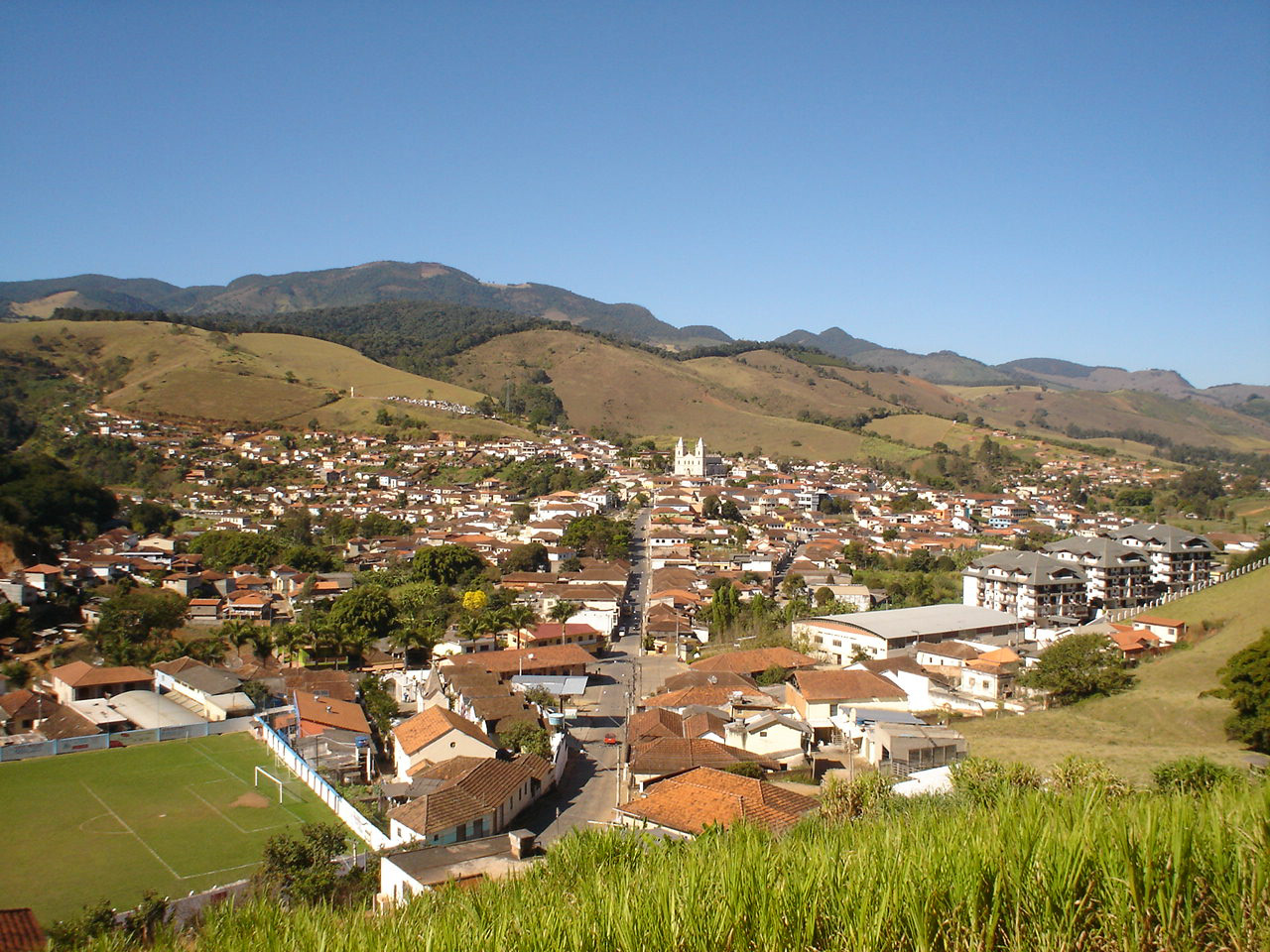
- View of Cristina

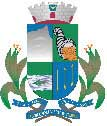
- Coat of arms

- Location in the State of Minas Gerais
- Coordinates: 22°12′43″S 45°15′50″W
- Country: Brazil
- Region: Southeast
- State: Minas Gerais
- Founded: May 13, 1774

Area
  - Total: 311.925 km^{2} (120.435 sq mi)
- Elevation: 1,025 m (3,363 ft)

Population (2020)
  - Total: 10,226
  - Density: 34/km^{2} (88/sq mi)
- Time zone: UTC−3 (BRT)
- Postal Code: 37476-000
- HDI (2010): 0.668 – medium
- Website: www.cristina.mg.gov.br

Cristina, Minas Gerais is a municipality in the state of Minas Gerais in the Southeast region of Brazil.

== Notable people ==
- Delfim Moreira, 10th President of Brazil

== See also ==
- List of municipalities in Minas Gerais
