= São José do Alegre =

- Municipality
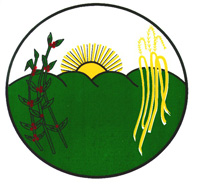
- Seal

- Location in the State of Minas Gerais
- Coordinates: 22°19′44″S 45°31′33″W
- Country: Brazil
- Region: Southeast
- State: Minas Gerais
- Founded: December 12, 1953

Area
  - Total: 89.243 km^{2} (34.457 sq mi)
- Elevation: 851 m (2,792 ft)

Population (2020)
  - Total: 4,210
  - Density: 46.6/km^{2} (121/sq mi)
- Time zone: UTC−3 (BRT)
- Postal Code: 37510-000

São José do Alegre is a municipality in the state of Minas Gerais in the Southeast region of Brazil.

== See also ==
- List of municipalities in Minas Gerais
