= Carmo de Minas =

- Municipality
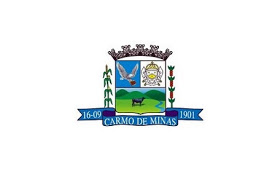
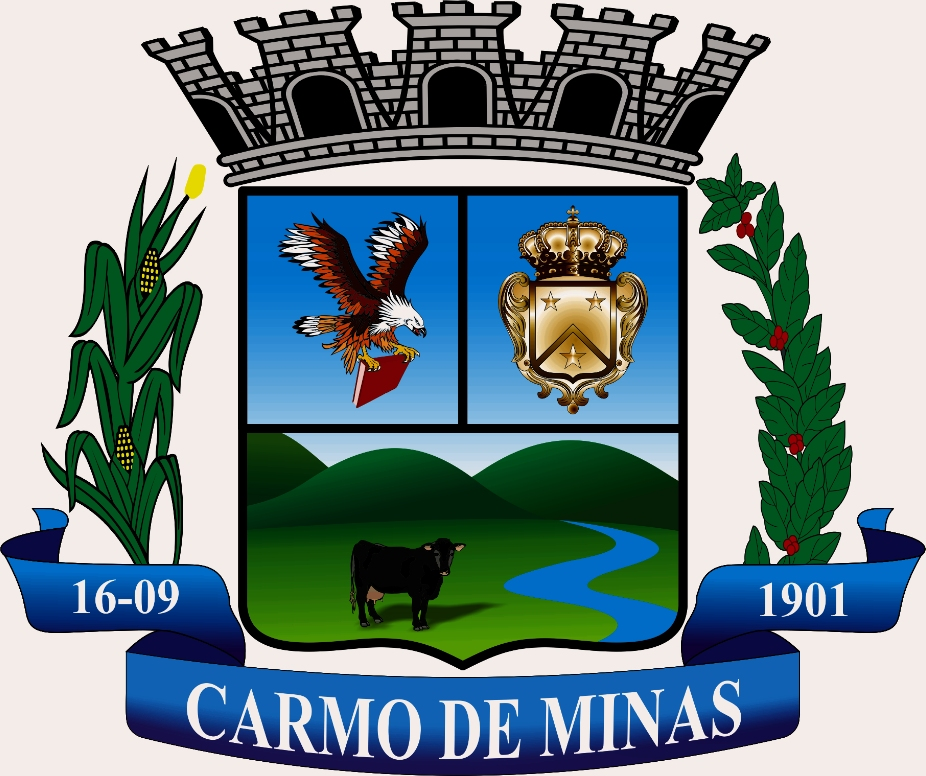
- Flag Coat of arms

- Location in Minas Gerais

- Location in Brazil
- Coordinates: 22°7′19″S 45°7′44″W
- Country: Brazil
- Region: Southeast
- State: Minas Gerais
- Mesoregion: Sul/Sudoeste de Minas

Population (2020)
  - Total: 14,947
- Time zone: UTC−3 (BRT)

Carmo de Minas is a municipality in the state of Minas Gerais in the Southeast region of Brazil.

== See also ==
- List of municipalities in Minas Gerais
