= Senador José Bento =

Coordinates: 22°10′S 46°10′W

- Municipality
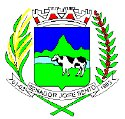
- Coat of arms
- Interactive map of Senador José Bento
- Country: Brazil
- Region: Southeast
- State: Minas Gerais
- Mesoregion: Sud/Sudoeste de Minas

Population (2020)
  - Total: 1,461
- Time zone: UTC−3 (BRT)

Senador José Bento is a municipality in the state of Minas Gerais in the Southeast region of Brazil.

== See also ==
- List of municipalities in Minas Gerais
