= Pedralva, Minas Gerais =

Pedralva
- Municipality
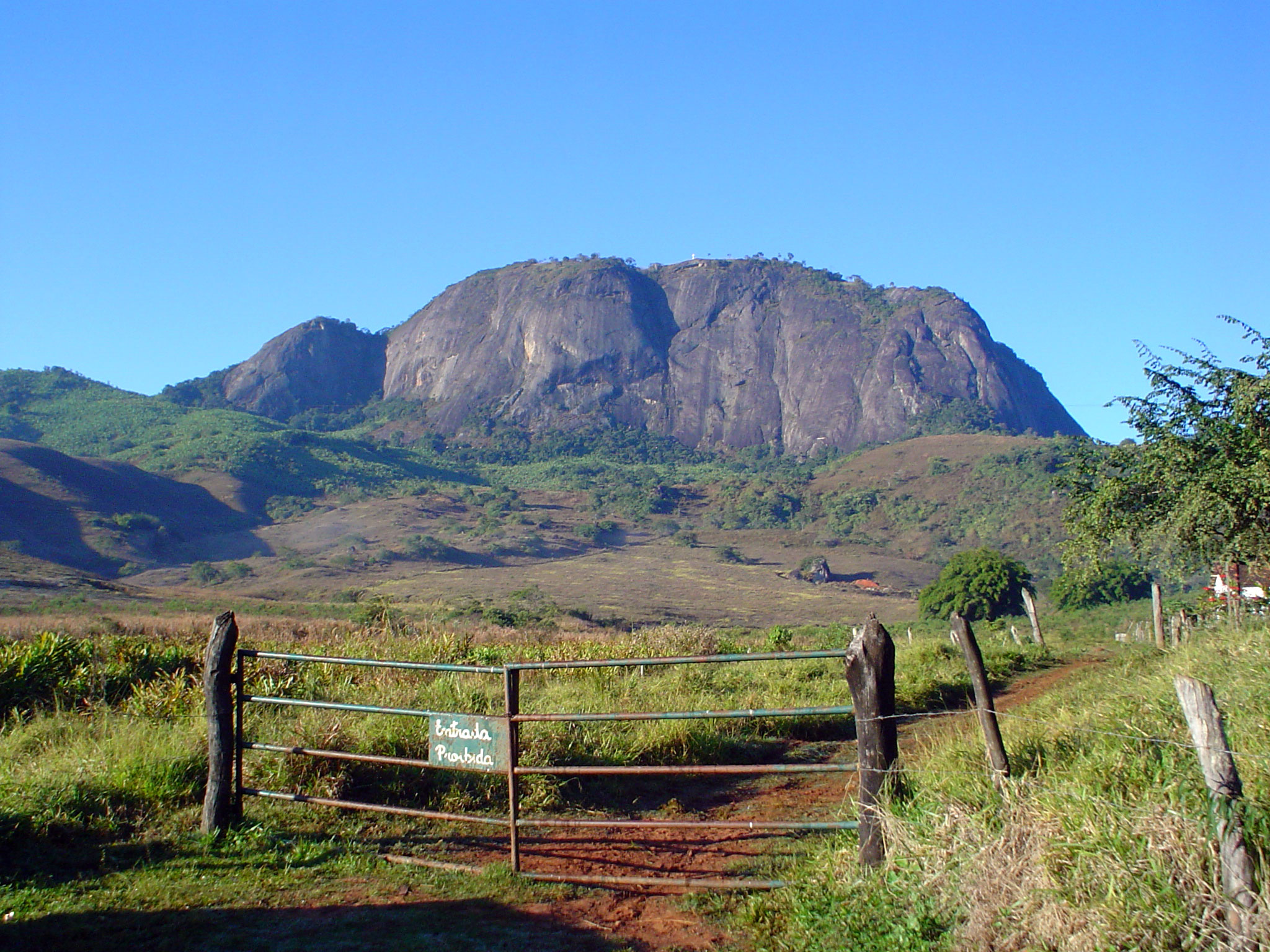
- Pedrão Mountain in Pedralva

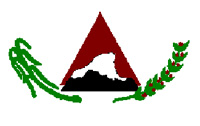
- Flag Coat of arms

- Location in the State of Minas Gerais
- Coordinates: 22°14′34″S 45°27′57″W
- Country: Brazil
- Region: Southeast
- State: Minas Gerais
- Founded: May 7, 1882

Area
  - Total: 217.298 km^{2} (83.899 sq mi)
- Elevation: 911 m (2,989 ft)

Population (2020)
  - Total: 11,146
  - Density: 58.7/km^{2} (152/sq mi)
- Time zone: UTC−3 (BST)
- Postal Code: 37520-000

Pedralva is a municipality in the state of Minas Gerais in the Southeast region of Brazil.

== See also ==
- List of municipalities in Minas Gerais
