= Piranguinho =

- Municipality
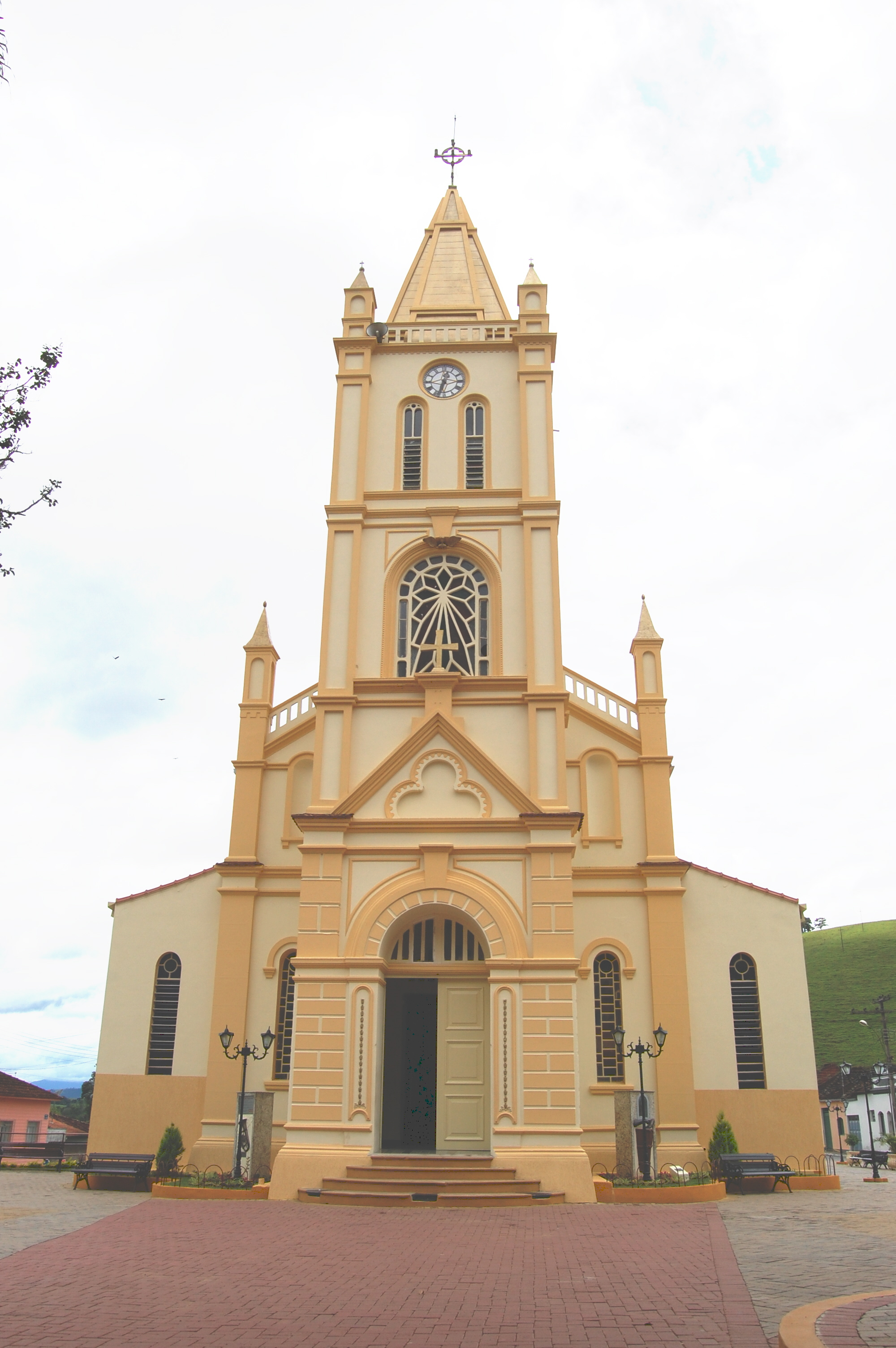
- Saint Elisabeth of Hungary Catholic Church

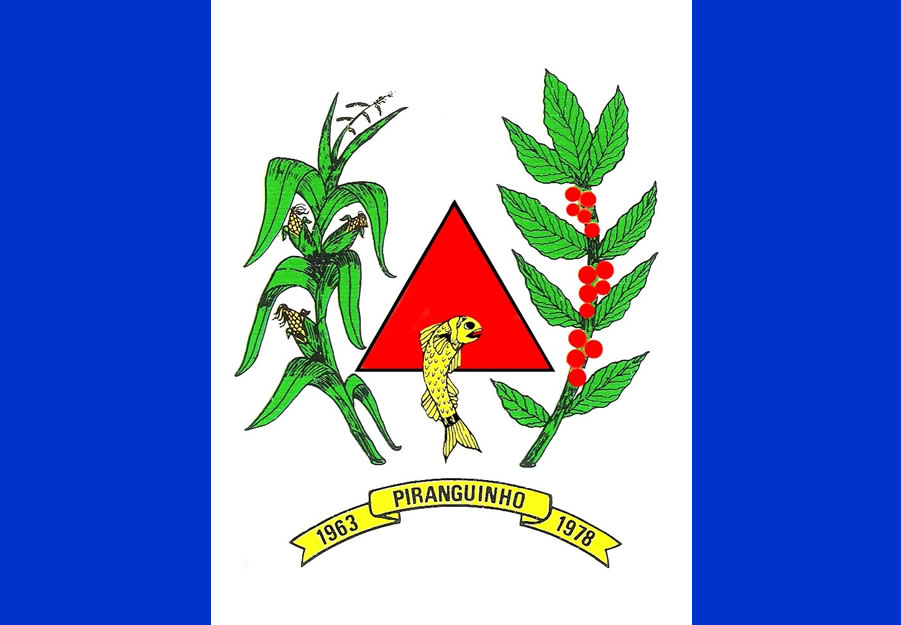
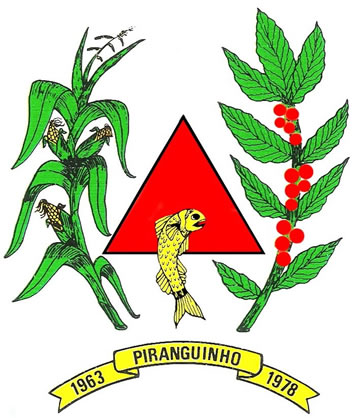
- Flag Coat of arms
- Nickname: Pé-de-moleque's National Capital
- Location in the State of Minas Gerais
- Coordinates: 22°24′03″S 45°31′55″W
- Country: Brazil
- Region: Southeast
- State: Minas Gerais
- Founded: March 1, 1963

Area
  - Total: 130.334 km^{2} (50.322 sq mi)

Population (2020)
  - Total: 8,640
  - Density: 64.5/km^{2} (167/sq mi)
- Time zone: UTC−3 (BRT)
- Postal Code: 37508-000
- Website: http://www.piranguinho.mg.gov.br/

Piranguinho is a municipality in the state of Minas Gerais in the Southeast region of Brazil.

It lies on the Sapucaí river valley, with mild to moderate temperatures during the year.

== History ==
Piranguinho's history resembles late in 19th century, when Brazil lived as an Empire, ruled by D. Pedro II. The country at that time had a great economic growth, due to the Coffee Cycle. This milestone can be remembered as the Southern part of Brazil received a lot of investments.

Although historians say that the coffee production was the solely activity responsible for the sudden development, it is well known that the Brazilian economy during this time faced a deep diversification on its activities. Then these activities were driven to supply the country internal needs. Therefore, these products can be also considered one of the factors that led to Brazil's modernization.

As a way to build up an infrastructure to support the Brazil's growth, railroads were constructed throughout all the country, then improving the communication and transport systems. As a direct result of these actions, many parts of Minas Gerais had the political, social, and economic boundaries expanded considerably.

The estate at that time was property of Baroness Leocádia de Lourenço. It was subordinated to São Caetano da Vargem Grande (currently Brazópolis). Later on the estate became a region of interest by the authorities responsible to develop the project for various railroads in Minas Gerais, called "Rede Mineira de Viação". Such contract sought the construction of a railroad connecting the cities of Itajubá and Santa Rita do Sapucaí. Besides these two cities, the railroad should be also connected to other nodes within Minas Gerais.

At that time, all the region had rich resources, necessary to the railroad construction. Hardwoods such as native Brazilian Jacarandá, Jequitibá, Taiúva, Pereira were available and in abundance. Then a deal was closed among the interest parties. The Baroness was responsible to lumber and provide the railroad sleepers necessary to the construction, work-force, to build up a water-powered sawmill (Portuguese: Engenho) to process the wood, rectify the Ribeirão dos Porcos course, and lastly manage all the infrastructure.

It is believed that the railroad construction started earlier in the 1880s. The increased demand for workers had attracted to the region a considerable number of people. This way, many wood and pau-a-pique homes were settled around the sawmill. Then a small community had started.

== Transportation ==
Piranguinho can count on the following roads that divides the city into sectors:

- BR-459 (In Portuguese)
- MG-295 (In Portuguese)

Note: When leaving or arriving Piranguinho towards MG-295, please watch out for the photo enforced radar installed on the city urban boundary. The speed limit is 40 km/h (24.8 Mph).

== Culture ==
The city is known in Brazil as the Brazilian National Capital of Pé-de-Moleque. Besides the gastronomy, Piranguinho has the following annual events:

- Rodeo at CRR (Centro Regional de Rodeio Paulo Max) that takes place in the 1st and 2nd half of each year
- Santa Efigênia's party (Catholic party that happens in July - The patron saint of Piranguinho)
- World's Biggest Pé-de-Moleque

== See also ==
- List of municipalities in Minas Gerais
