= Itajubá =

Itajubá, Minas Gerais
- Municipality
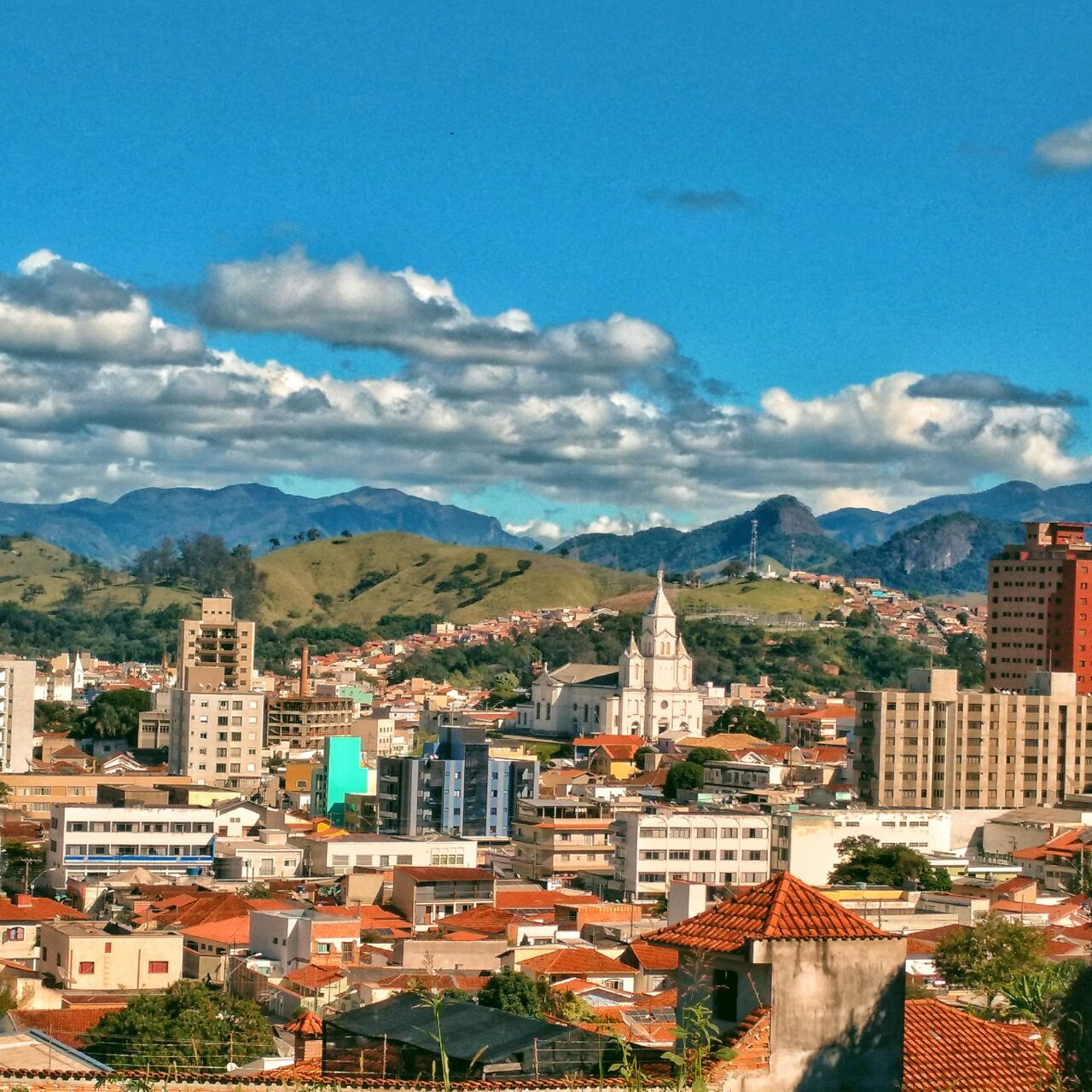
- View of Itajubá

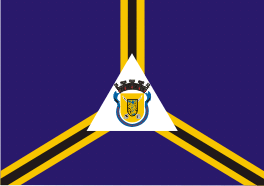
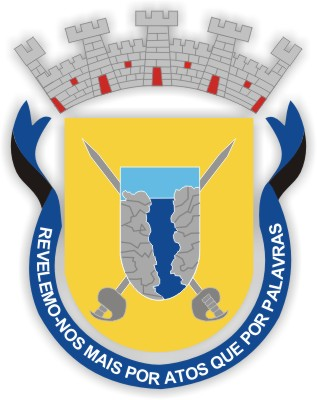
- Flag Coat of arms

- Location in the State of Minas Gerais
- Coordinates: 22°25′33″S 45°27′10″W
- Country: Brazil
- Region: Southeast
- State: Minas Gerais
- Founded: March 19, 1819

Government
  - Mayor: Rodrigo Imar Martinez Riera (2025-2028)

Area
  - Total: 294,835 km^{2} (113,836 sq mi)
- Elevation: 845 m (2,772 ft)

Population (2020)
  - Total: 97,334
  - Density: 312.1/km^{2} (808/sq mi)
- Time zone: UTC−3 (BST)
- Postal Code: 37500-000
- Website: http://www.itajuba.mg.gov.br

Itajubá is a municipality in southeastern Minas Gerais state of the Federative Republic of Brazil. It lies in a valley by the Sapucaí river and has terrain elevations ranging from 827 to 1500 metres, occupying an area of 290.45 km^{2} (112.14 mi^{2}), with a population of 97,334 people (2020 est). Neighboring the city are the mountain slopes of the Serra da Mantiqueira range. The climate sees heavy rain in the summer months with dry weather in the winter.

The city is a center with direct influence over 14 other municipalities of a region (called "Microregião do Sapucaí") that contains 6% of the population of Minas Gerais state. The local economy is based mainly on industry and agriculture. There are industries of auto parts, fiber optics, textile, electronic components, helicopters (Helibrás), and military weapons (IMBEL). In agriculture, most of the production is coffee, banana, potatoes, and is centred in the vicinity of Maria da Fé city where the climate is cooler.

== History ==
In the beginning of the 19th century, the region was mostly occupied by native Brazilians, the Puri-Coroados. In January 1819, priest Lourenço da Costa Moreira moved to the parish of Delfim Moreira (known at that time as Soledade de Itajubá). The place was deserted, since it was just a small village in the middle of the woods of the Serra da Mantiqueira, far away from a river. Moreira told the people in the settlement that its topography was unfavorable to its development. He invited them to move the village to a place closer to the Sapucaí River, down the mountains. About 80 families accepted the invitation and, on the morning of March 18, 1819 they moved. The next day, Moreira celebrated the first catholic mass in the new location. The new Itajubá was founded. After comparisons of topography had been made, part of the population decided to build a new church. Moreira then gathered the people and they moved the old church's pictures and items to the new church.

According to historians Geraldino Campista and J. Armelim Bernardo Guimarães, the name Itajubá means "water that falls on the rock" or "waterfall". There are several small waterfalls scattered in the vicinities of Itajubá.

The town is also the site of the Federal University of Itajubá, founded in 1913, which offers degrees in several technical fields, and also three other regionally important educational institutions: the Centro Universitário de Itajubá - Universitas (Itajubá University Center), the Faculdade de Medicina de Itajubá (Itajubá College of Medicine) and the FACESM - Faculdade de Ciências Sociais e Econômicas do Sul de Minas (South Minas Gerais Economic and Social Sciences College).

== Geography ==
The municipality is made up of the districts of the headquarters and Lourenço Velho. It borders the municipalities of São José do Alegre, Maria da Fé, Wenceslau Braz, Piranguçu, Piranguinho and Delfim Moreira. Its territory belongs to the Sapucaí River basin and the headquarters is located at latitude 22° 26’ South and longitude 45° 27’ West.

According to the regional division in force since 2017, established by the IBGE, the municipality is located in the Immediate Geographic Region of Itajubá, belonging to the Intermediate Geographic Region of Pouso Alegre. Until then, with the divisions into microregions and mesoregions in force, it was part of the microregion of Itajubá, which in turn was included in the mesoregion of the South and Southwest of Minas.

== Local media ==
The city has two weekly newspapers, six radio stations (FM and AM) and a local TV station. Of the six radio stations, one is a federal university (UNIFEI) station.

== Strategic industry ==
The city has a major armament and blade weapons factory, the Indústria de Material Bélico do Brasil - IMBEL (Brazilian Warfare Material Industry), builder of a licensed copy of the FN FAL assault rifle and several models of military-issue knives.

== Demographics ==
The population was estimated at 96,869 according to the Brazilian Institute of Geography and Statistics in 2019. The human development index of the municipality was estimated at 0.815.

It has a predominantly urban population, with 92 percent of the inhabitants living in its urban region and eight percent living in the countryside. Its vegetative growth rates are low, at around 1.3% per year. There is a large student population, mainly in undergraduate and graduate courses offered by colleges in the city. The city has many professional schools, thus having a lot of specialized labor.

== Government and politics ==
The current mayor is Rodrigo Imar Martinez Riera of the PSD party, and vice-mayor Roberto Sorgi of UNIÃO.

== Sister cities - twin towns ==
Itajubá has a one sister city:

Itabira, Minas Gerais, Brazil

== See also ==
- Federal University of Itajubá
- List of municipalities in Minas Gerais
