= Alagoa =

Alagoa may refer to:

== People ==
- E. J. Alagoa. Nigerian historian

== Places ==
Brazil:

- Alagoas, a northeastern state
- Alagoa, Minas Gerais
- Alagoa Grande, Paraíba
- Alagoa Nova, Paraíba
- Conceição das Alagoas, Minas Gerais
- Estrela de Alagoas, Alagoas

Portugal:

- Alagoa, Portalegre
