= Pouso Alto =

- Municipality
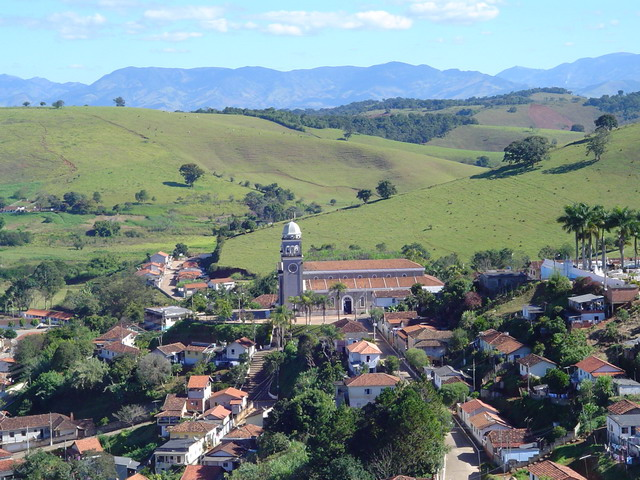

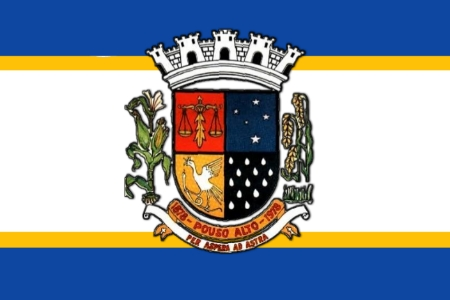
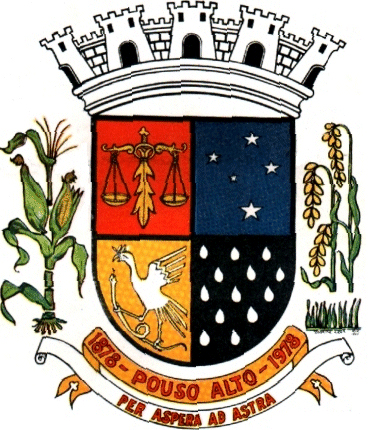
- Flag Coat of arms
- Interactive map of Pouso Alto
- Coordinates: 22°11′37″S 44°58′21″W
- Country: Brazil
- Region: Southeast
- State: Minas Gerais
- Mesoregion: Sul/Sudoeste de Minas
- Elevation: 884 m (2,900 ft)

Population (2020)
  - Total: 5,900
- Time zone: UTC−3 (BRT)

Pouso Alto (translation: High Landing) is a municipality in the state of Minas Gerais in the Southeast region of Brazil.

The municipality contains 4.39% of the 22,917-hectare (56,630-acre) Serra do Papagaio State Park, created in 1998.

== See also ==
- List of municipalities in Minas Gerais
