= Baependi =

Coordinates: 21°57′S 44°53′W

- Municipality
- Municipality of Baependi
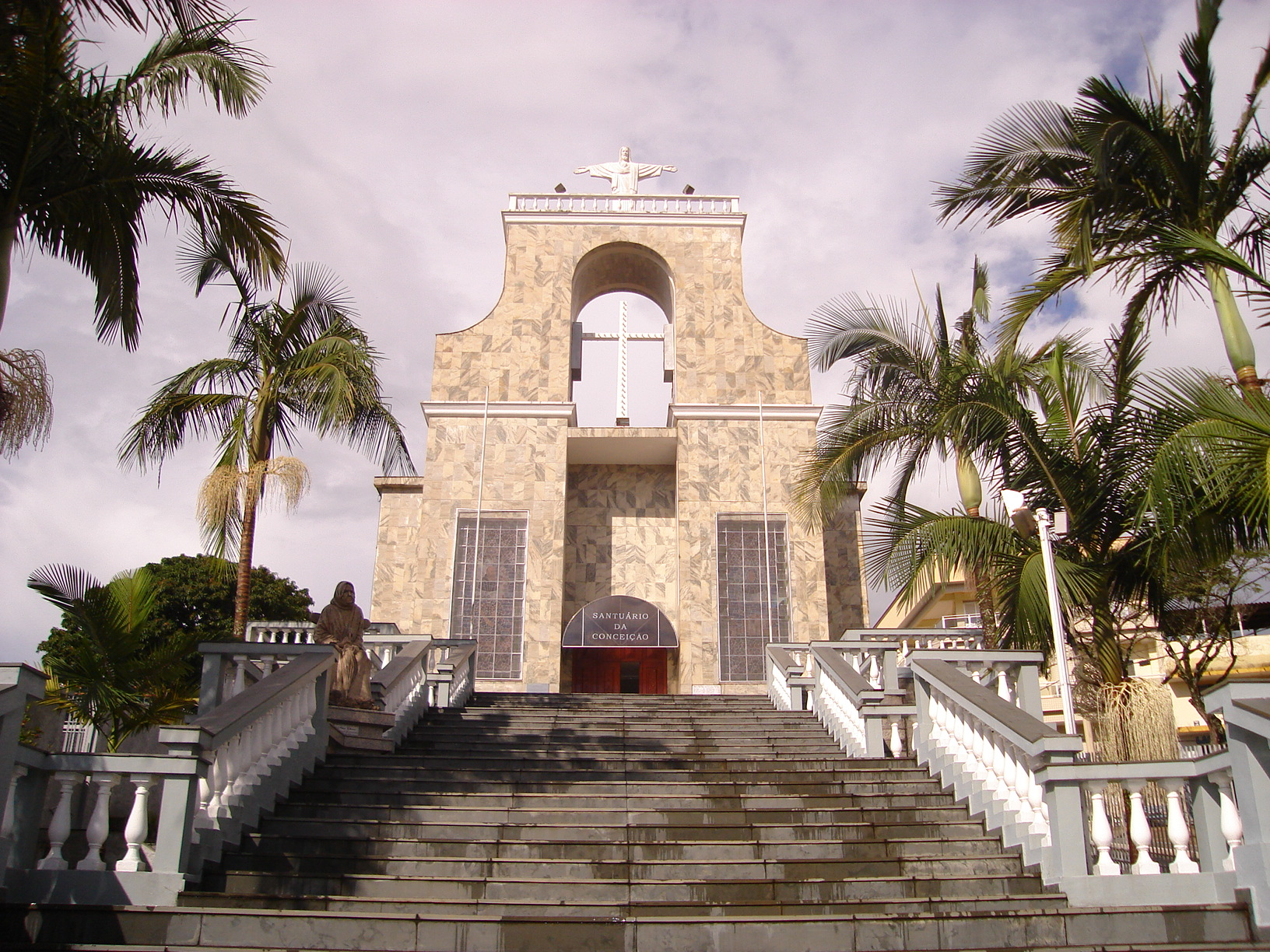

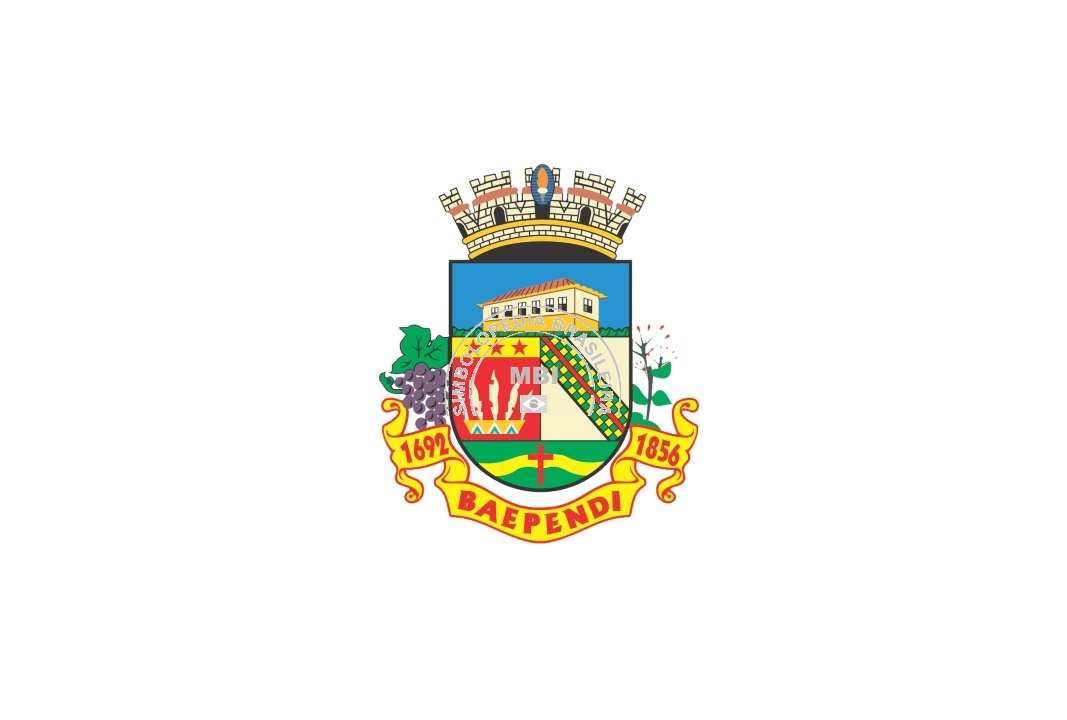
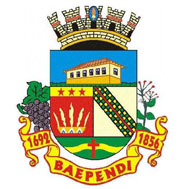
- Flag Coat of arms

- Location in of Minas Gerais
- Country: Brazil
- State: Minas Gerais
- Region: Southeast
- Intermediate Region: Pouso Alegre
- Immediate Region: Caxambu-Baependi
- Founded: 19 July 1814

Government
  - Mayor: Douglas Staduto Souza (PTB)

Area
  - Total: 750.554 km^{2} (289.791 sq mi)
- Elevation: 893 m (2,930 ft)

Population (2021)
  - Total: 19,249
  - Density: 25.646/km^{2} (66.424/sq mi)
- Demonym: baependiano
- Time zone: UTC−3 (BRT)
- Postal Code: 37443-000 to 37444-999
- HDI (2010): 0.681 – medium
- Website: baependi.mg.gov.br

Baependi is a Brazilian municipality in the state of Minas Gerais.

== Geography ==
The population of Baependi as of 2020 was estimated to be 19,199 people living at an altitude of 893 meters. The area of the municipality is 751.748 km^{2}. The city belongs to the mesoregion of Sul e Sudoeste de Minas and to the microregion of São Lourenço.

The municipality contains 39.93% of the 22,917 hectares (56,630 acres) Serra do Papagaio State Park, created in 1998.

== Toponym ==
"Baependi" is derived from the tupi language and means "water of the flattened thing"; mba'e ("thing"), peb ("flattened") and 'y ("water or river"). Another theory says that the name comes from the tupi mbaé-pindi, meaning "open glade".

== History ==
According to some reports, mining occurred in the southern region from 1601. The conquest of Baependi happened, however, at the end of the seventeenth century, around 1692, when the Paulistas Antonio Delgado da Veiga, his son Joao da Veiga and uncle Miguel Garcia and Captain Manoel Garcia Velho, started from Taubaté in search of gold. Crossing the Serra da Mantiqueira, they reached a site called maependi (mbaé-pindi means "open clearing" in Tupi-guarani).

The city is a remnant of the so-called cycle of Gold in Minas Gerais. Baependi developed along the Estrada Real - the first major means of regular communication in Brazil which linked the mines to the port of Paraty in Rio de Janeiro from where gold was shipped to Europe.

The Madeiran Tomé Rodrigues Nogueira do Ó (1715), Captain-mor and Ombudsman of Quintos the "registration of the Mantiqueira" was one of the first residents of the site and is considered the founder of the city as the first builder. Mining was, gradually, replaced by agriculture and cattle breeding. It had a large tobacco plantation, which made Baependi the centre of production of the province of Minas Gerais and represented a major source of wealth until the mid-nineteenth century.

Nowadays the municipality's economy is based on agriculture, handicrafts, gem stones, quartzite and tourism, due to the natural environment of the city, surrounded by mountains, forests, rivers and numerous waterfalls. Craft is an important economic activity in Baependi. Pieces made in bamboo, straw, corn and coffee wood are distributed in large urban centres such as São Paulo, Rio de Janeiro and Belo Horizonte.

== Culture ==
Baependi, as of 2015, is known to follow natural day-night sleep cycles, despite the availability of artificial lighting and electricity. The countryside surrounding Baependi rise at 6h30 and sleep at 21h20, while the town does so at 7h15 and 22h20 respectively. The difference is thought to be due to the influence of artificial lighting. The community is being studied due to their adherence to a diurnal/nocturnal cycle similar to that of ancestral humans.

=== Religion ===
Baependi has had a parish church since 1723. The ceremony of the Holy Week in Baependi has continued for over 200 years, being one of the most traditional of Minas Gerais. The daily processions accompanied by band and choir represent the passion and death of Jesus Christ.

Churches include:

- the Santuário de Nossa Senhora Conceição (better known as church of Nhá Chica)
- the parish church Nossa Senhora do Montserrat (1754)
- Nossa Senhora da Boa Morte (1815)
- Rosario (1820)

== Notable people ==
- José Zacarias de Miranda (born 1851), one of the pioneers of Presbyterianism in Brazil

== See also ==
- List of municipalities in Minas Gerais
- SS Baependy
