= Serra do Papagaio State Park =

State park in Minas Gerais, Brazil

- Parque Estadual da Serra do Papagaio
- IUCN category II (national park)
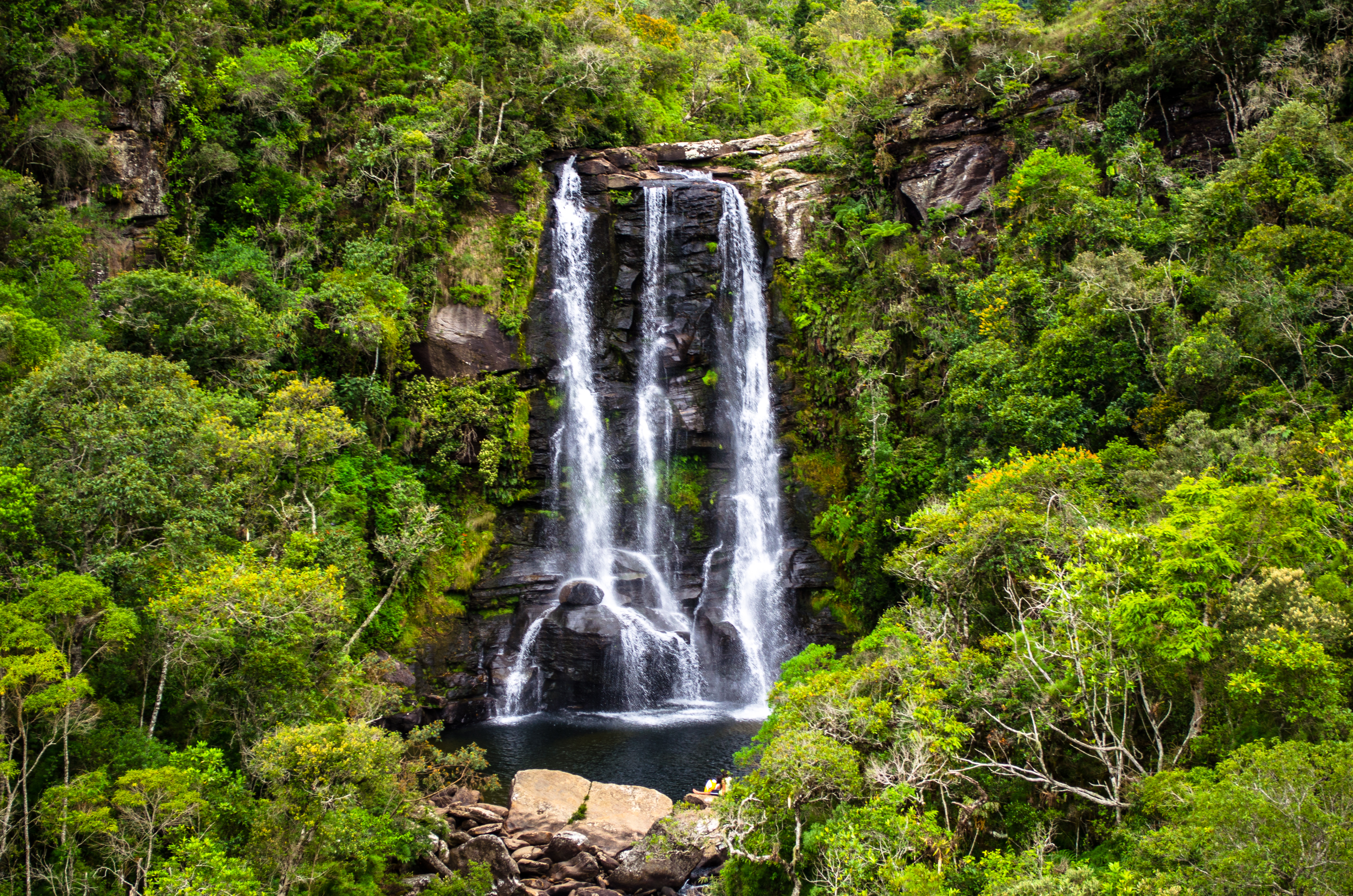
- Cachoeira dos Garcias (Aiuruoca)

- Location within Brazil
- Nearest city: Baependi, Minas Gerais
- Coordinates: 22°07′14″S 44°42′29″W
- Area: 22,917 hectares (56,630 acres)
- Designation: State park
- Created: 5 August 1998
- Administrator: Instituto Estadual de Florestas MG

The Serra do Papagaio State Park (Portuguese: Parque Estadual da Serra do Papagaio) is a state park in the state of Minas Gerais, Brazil. It protects a mountainous region of Atlantic Forest.

== Location ==
The Serra do Papagaio State Park is divided between the municipalities of Aiuruoca (15.76%), Alagoa (5.38%), Baependi (39.93%), Itamonte (34.54%) and Pouso Alto (4.39%) in Minas Gerais. It has an area of 22,917 hectares (56,630 acres). The park is located in the Mantiqueira Mountains, and includes parts of the Garrafão and Papagaio ranges. About half the area has steep slopes and altitudes above 1,800 metres (5,900 ft). The highest peaks are in the south, including the Morro da Mitra do Bispo at 2,149 metres (7,051 ft) and the southeast, including the Pico do Bandeira at 2,357 metres (7,733 ft).

== Environment ==
The park holds an important remnant of Atlantic Forest. It includes meadows, forests and enclaves of Araucaria forest. It is the source of the headwaters of major rivers that form the Rio Grande. Geographically it is connected to the northern part of the Itatiaia National Park, helping protect fauna and flora by providing a continuous area of protected mountains.

Construction of a hydroelectric power plant in the municipality of Aiuruoca, within the Serra da Mantiqueira Environmental Protection Area and part of the Serra do Papagaio State Park, has caused outrage in the local community and environmentalists. It is part of a program to build 65 small hydroelectric plants in Brazil, including 33 in Minas Gerais, which would threaten the last remnants of riparian forest in the state.

== History ==
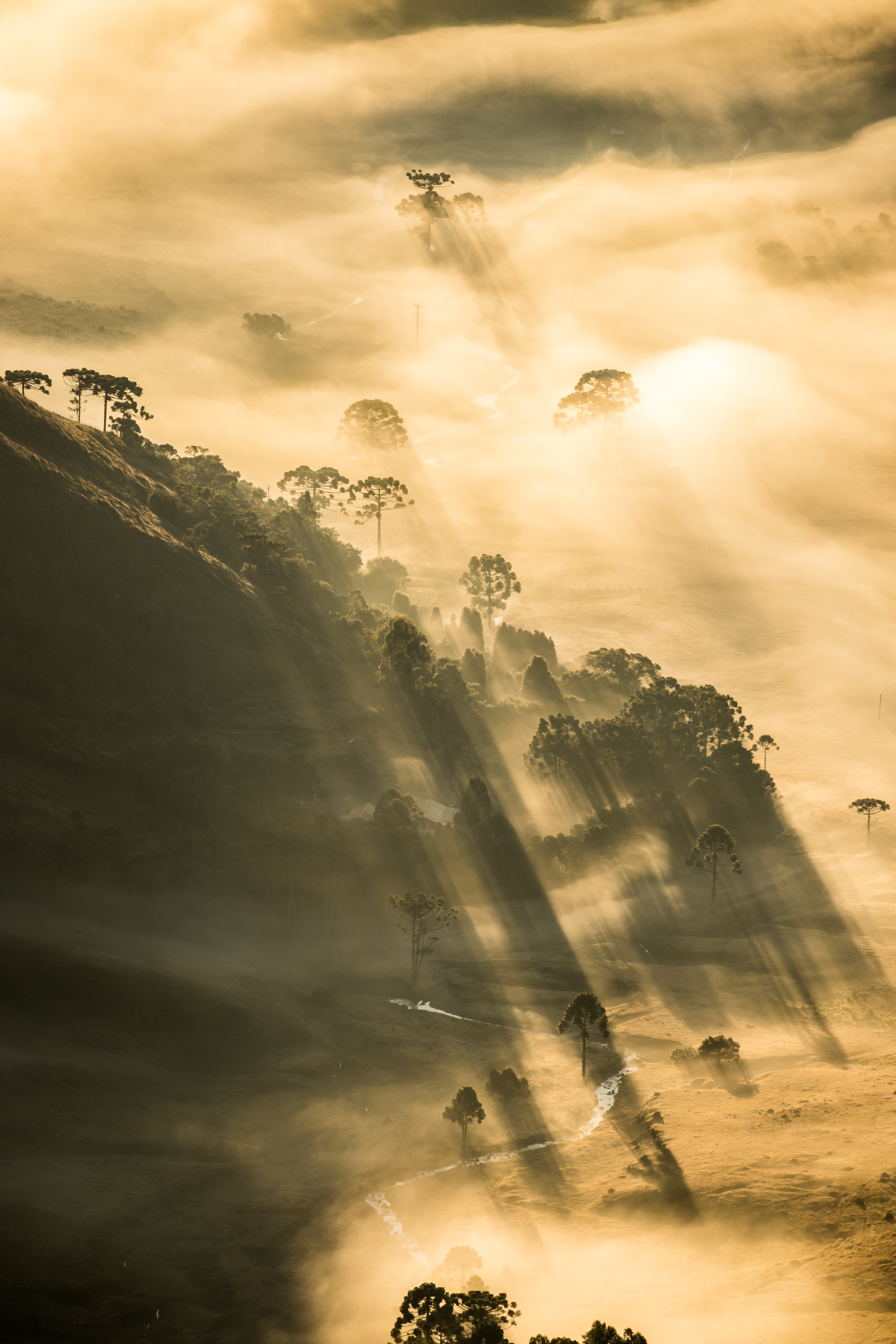
Crepuscular rays at Serra do Papagaio State Park, Minas Gerais, Brazil.

The Serra do Papagaio State Park was created by state governor decree 39.793 of 5 August 1998 with an area of about 22,917 hectares (56,630 acres). It is administered by the Instituto Estadual de Florestas. It is part of the Mantiqueira Mosaic of conservation units, created in 2006.

== Gallery ==
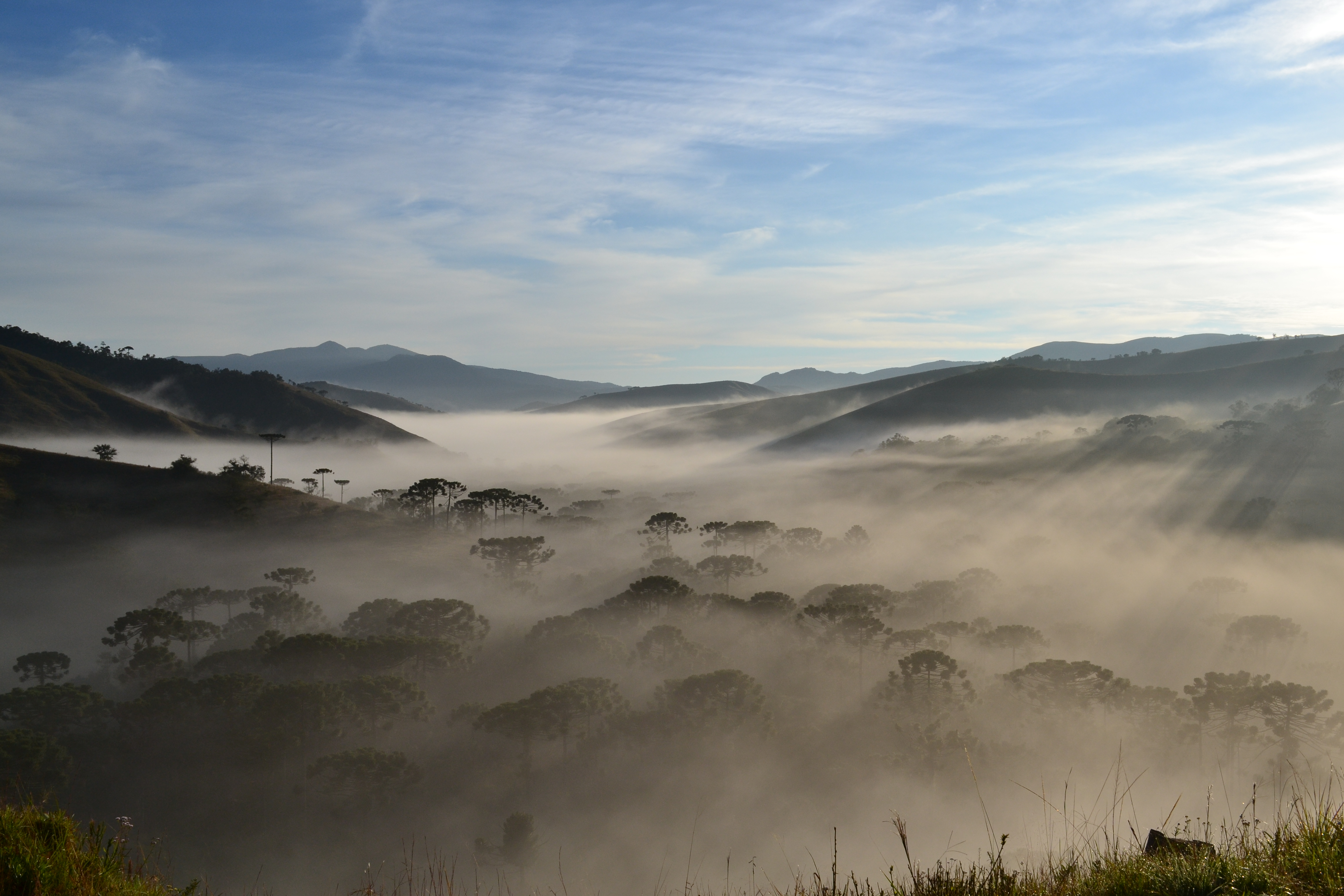
Neblina em floresta de araucárias

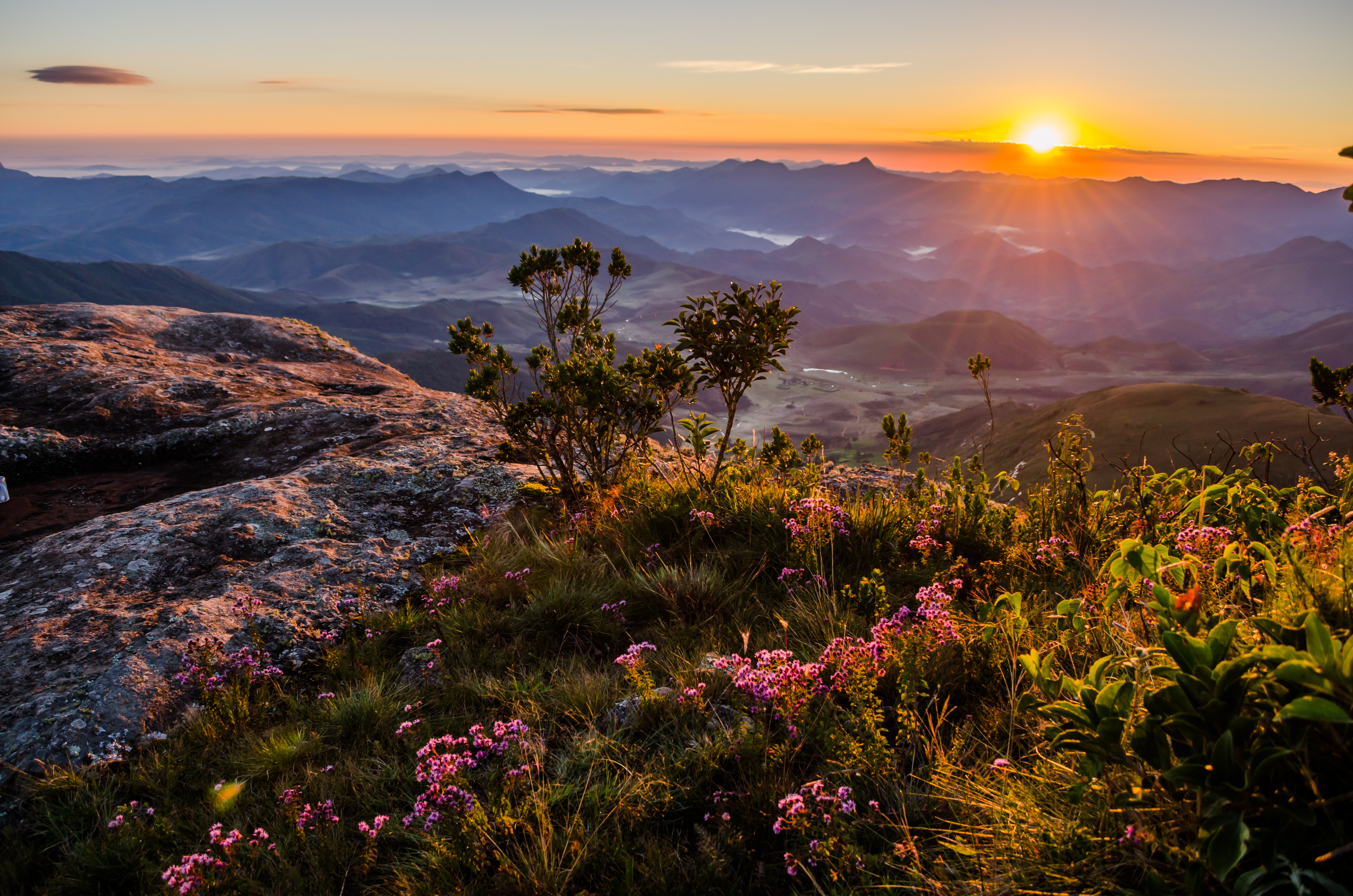
Pico do Garrafão

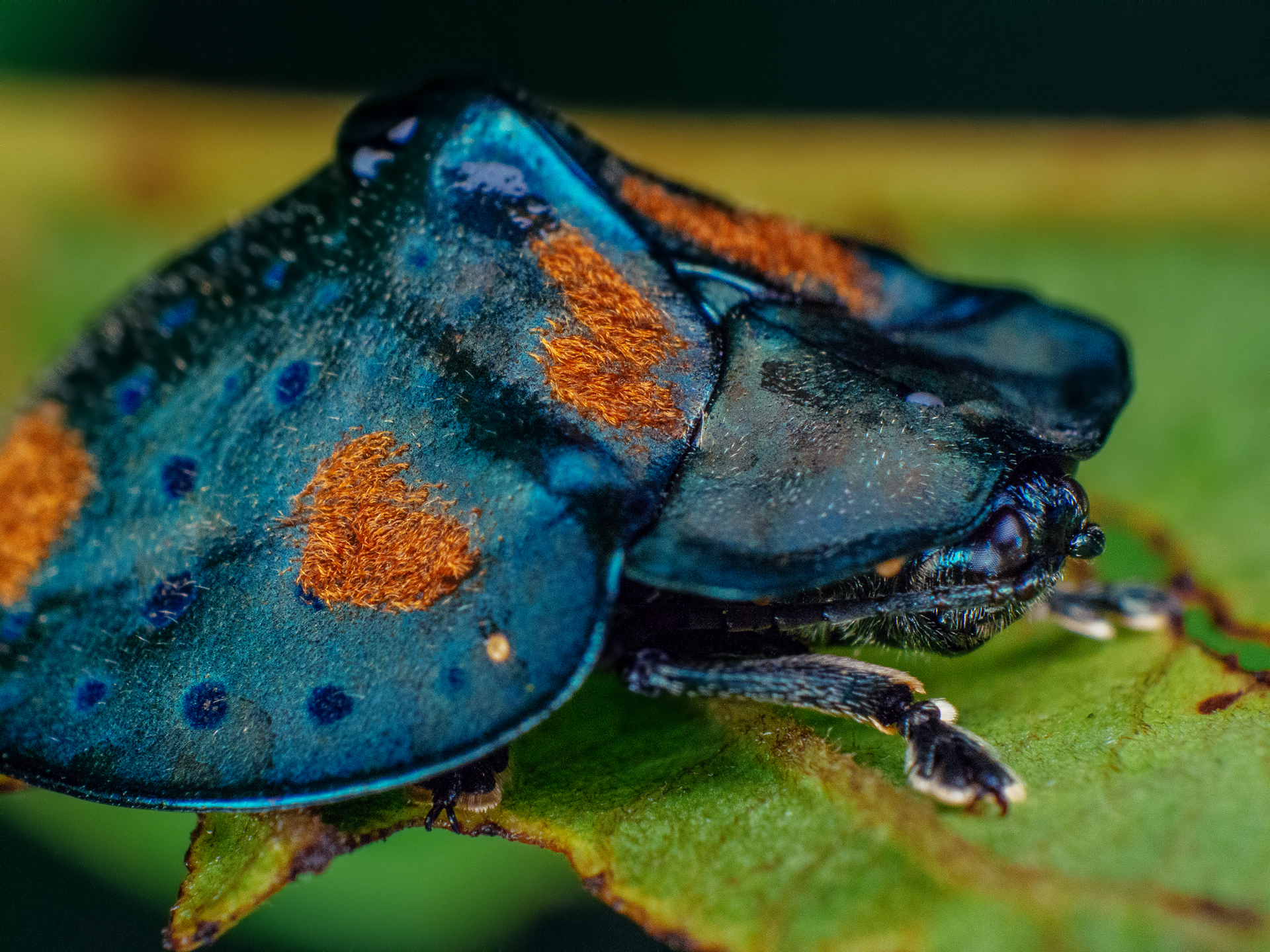
Besouro-tartaruga encontrado em trilha

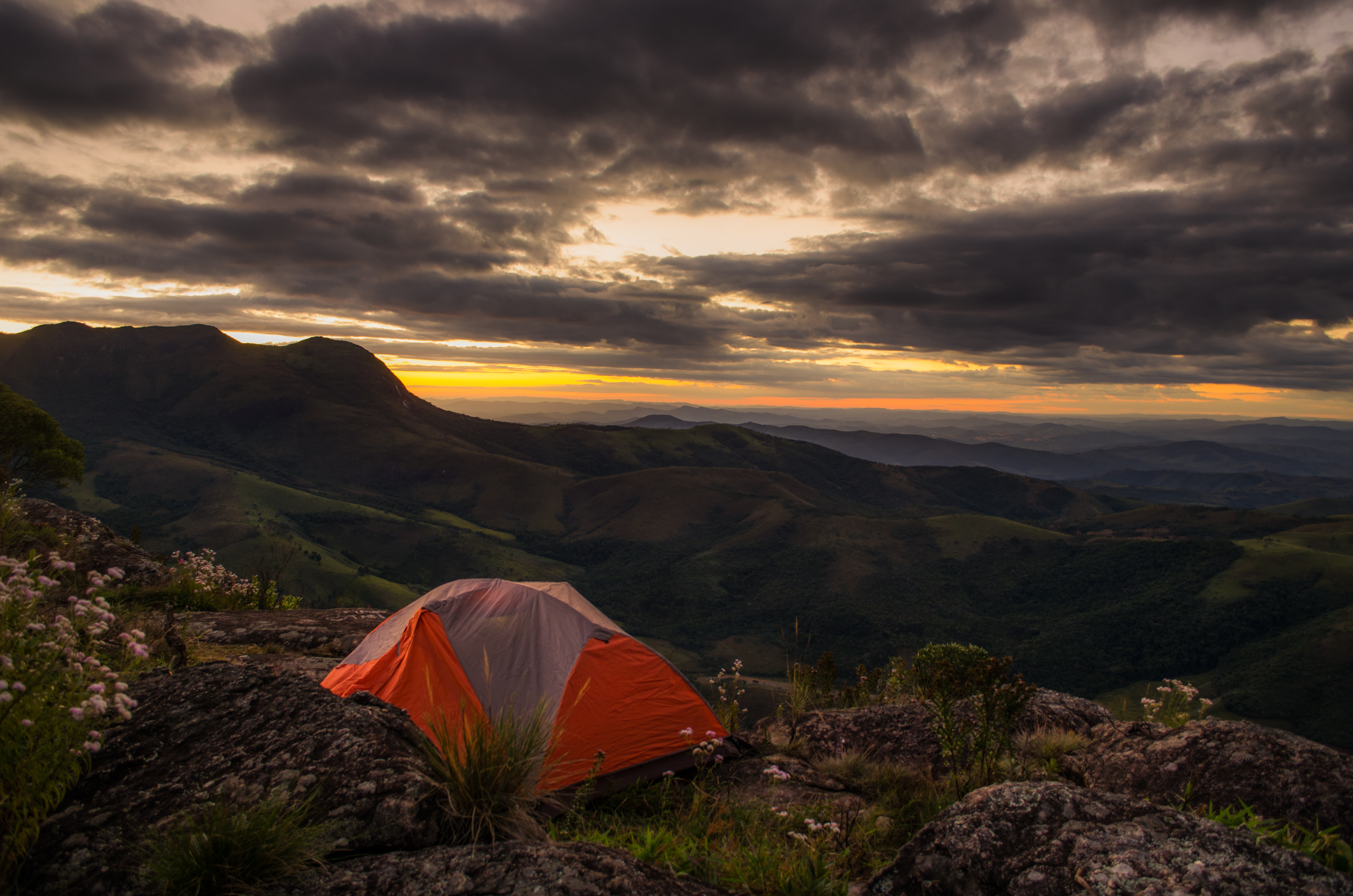
Pico do Chorão

== Sources ==
- o mosaico mantiqueira (in Portuguese), Mosaico Mantiqueira, archived from the original on 2016-09-27
- PES da Serra do Papagaio (in Portuguese), ISA: Instituto Socioambiental
