= Nhá Chica =

Afro-Brazilian Catholic Virgin and Blessed

Blessed Francisca de Paula de Jesus
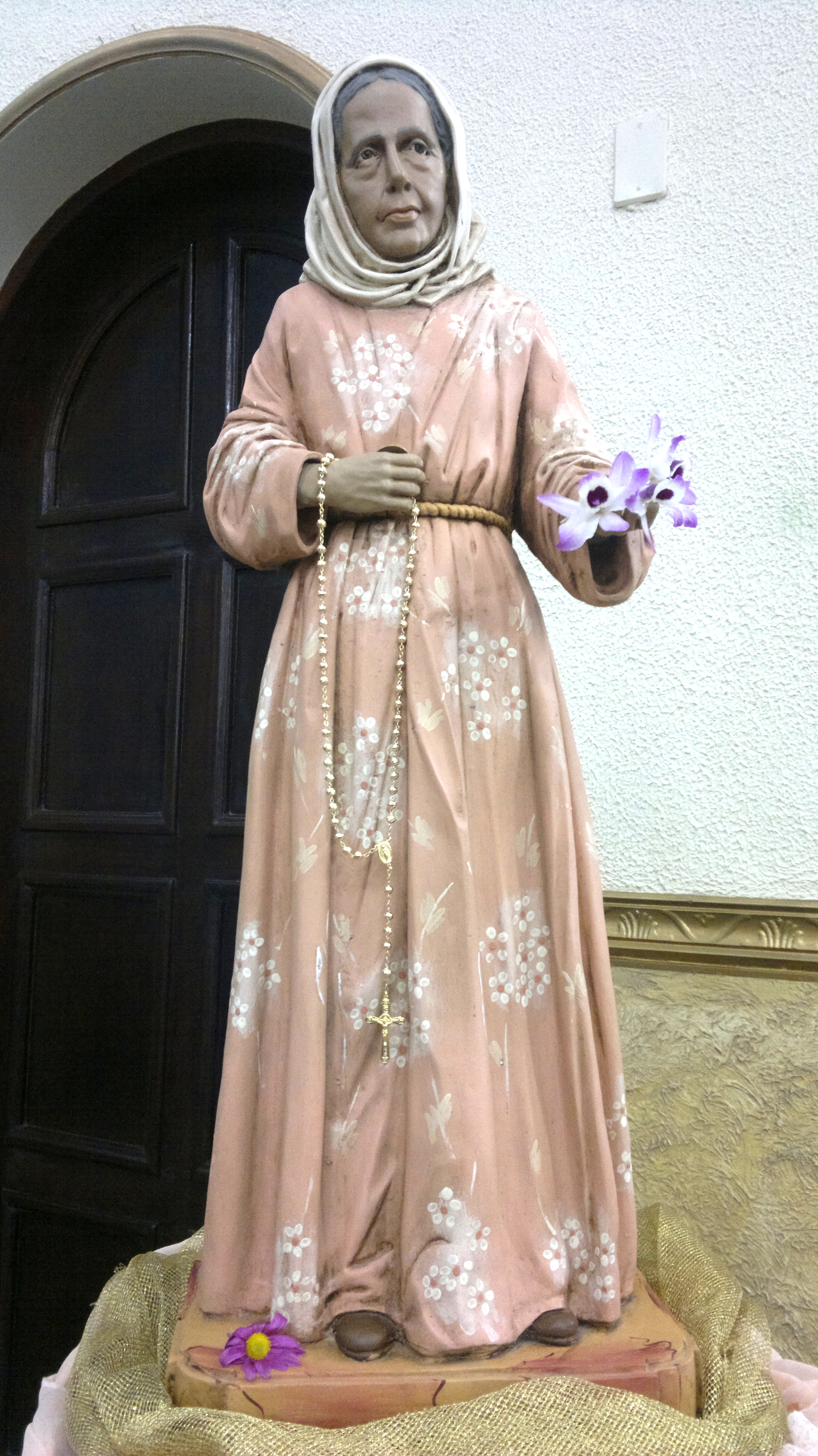

Virgin
- Born: 1810; São João del-Rei, Minas Gerais, Brazil
- Died: 14 June 1895; Baependi, Minas Gerais, Brazil
- Venerated in: Roman Catholic Church
- Beatified: 4 May 2013, Baependi, Minas Gerais, Brazil by Cardinal Angelo Amato
- Major shrine: Our Lady of Conception Sanctuary, Baependi, Brazil
- Feast: 14 June

Francisca de Paula de Jesus (São João del-Rei, Minas Gerais, 1810 – Baependi, Minas Gerais, 14 June 1895), also known as Nhá Chica ("Aunt Francie" in Portuguese), was a formerly enslaved Afro-Brazilian Catholic laywoman known for her humble life and her dedication to God.

Nhá Chica bore no surname and was an illegitimate child born to an enslaved mother; she herself was enslaved until being freed in 1820 which allowed her to dedicate herself to the plight of the region's poor and the construction of a Marian chapel near which she resided for the remainder of her life.

Her beatification was celebrated in Brazil in mid-2013 and made her the first Afro-Brazilian woman to be beatified.

== Life ==
Francisca de Paula de Jesus was born illegitimate in Santo Antônio do Rio das Mortes Pequeno, a neighborhood in São João del-Rei, in 1810 to the enslaved Brazilian woman Izabel Maria. It was there that Francisca, also enslaved, was baptized on 26 April 1810; this means her birth took place in the first quarter of 1810. Her mother decided to relocate after being freed in 1820, so the family moved to Baependi, where she lived until her death. Her maternal grandparents were also enslaved. Her half-brother, Theotonio Pereira do Armaral, came from another union.

In 1820 she had dedicated her life to her faith and decided to help the poor at her mother's request, as she was on her deathbed at that time; her mother's freedom was for only a few months before she died. The girl now chose to live alone rather than with her half-brother, and refused all marriage proposals put forward to her. Her brother died in 1862 and she was designated as his sole heir; she used her newfound inheritance to increase her social work and begin construction of a Marian chapel. Donations were used as a means for her to build the "Our Lady of Conception Sanctuary".

Despite being illiterate and impoverished, she welcomed the poor into her new place and became known as the "Mother of the Poor". She lived in a humble two-room hovel and constructed a small altar adorned with roses, and she was well known for giving acts of comfort and spiritual healing to those that visited her. On 8 July 1888 she drafted up a will in which she decided to leave all her possessions to her local parish and set out how she wanted the parish to distribute her possessions among the poor. She also set out how she wanted her funeral as well as the number of Masses celebrated for her soul.

Nhá Chica died on 14 June 1895 in her chapel, where she was buried on the following 18 June. It was reported that there was an unusual smell of perfume when she was buried and when her coffin was opened on 18 June 1998.

== Beatification ==
The beatification process commenced on 17 January 1992 under Pope John Paul II after the Congregation for the Causes of Saints issued the official "nihil obstat" to the cause and titled her as a Servant of God; the diocesan process was held in Campanha from 10 October 1993 until 31 May 1995 while a supplementary process was held throughout 1998. The C.C.S. later validated these two previous processes in Rome on 12 March 1999 and received the Positio from the postulation in 2000. Historians first assessed and approved the cause on 30 October 2001 as did the theologians on 8 June 2010 and the C.C.S. on 11 January 2011. The confirmation of her life of heroic virtue on 14 January 2011 allowed for Pope Benedict XVI to name her as Venerable.

The process for the miracle required for her beatification took place in 1998 and received validation from the C.C.S. on 8 October 1999 before a team of medical experts approved it around a decade later on 13 October 2011; theologians also assented to this on 18 February 2012 as did the C.C.S. on 5 June 2012. Benedict XVI approved this miracle on 28 June 2012 and thus confirmed the beatification would take place. Cardinal Angelo Amato presided over the beatification in Brazil on 4 May 2013 on the behalf of Pope Francis. The miracle that secured her beatification was the 1995 cure of the Brazilian woman Ana Lucia Meirelles who had been healed from pulmonary hypertension.

The current postulator for this cause is Dr. Paolo Vilotta.
