= Estrela de Alagoas =

Municipality in Alagoas, Brazil

- Municipality of Alagoas, Brazil
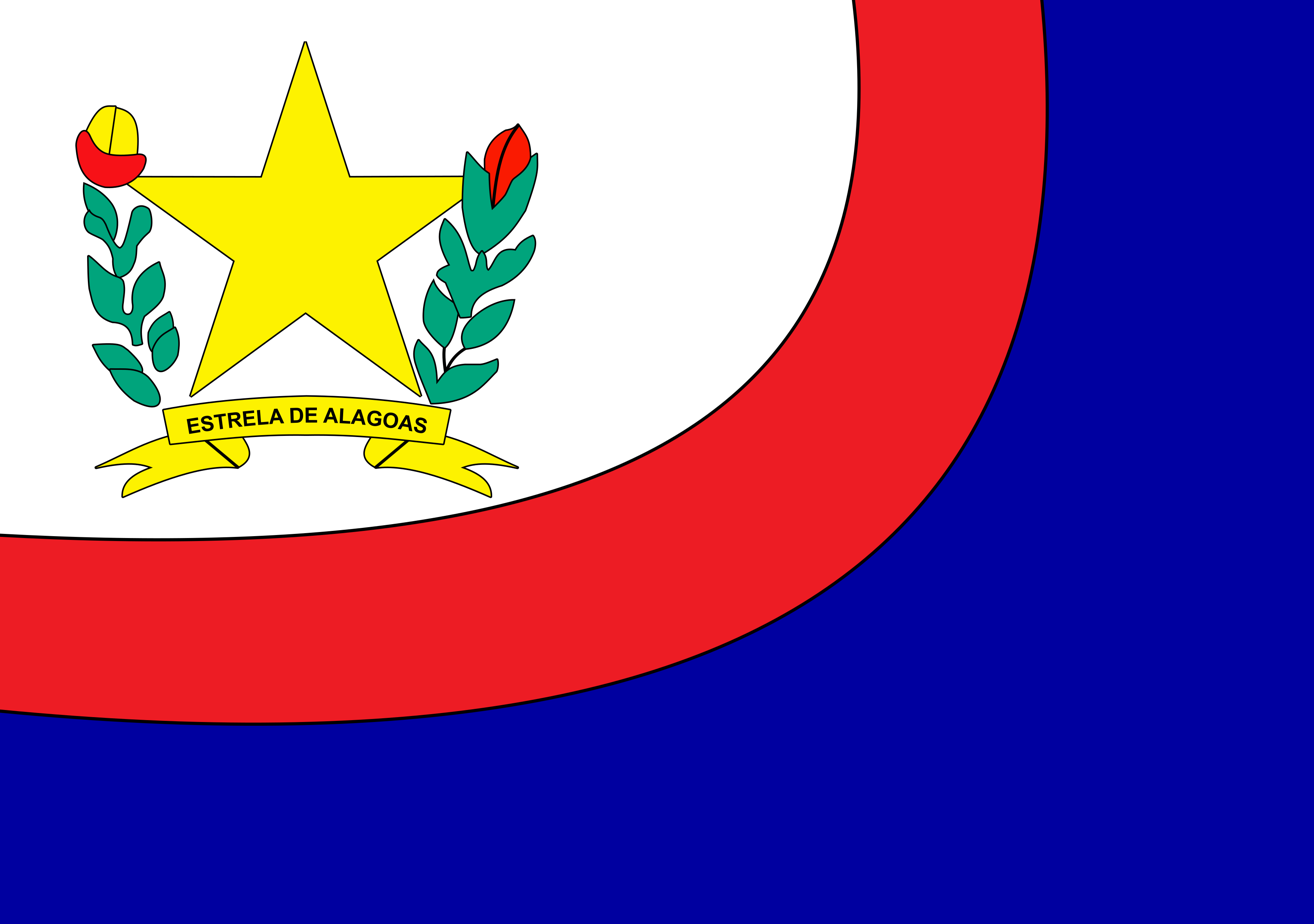
- Flag

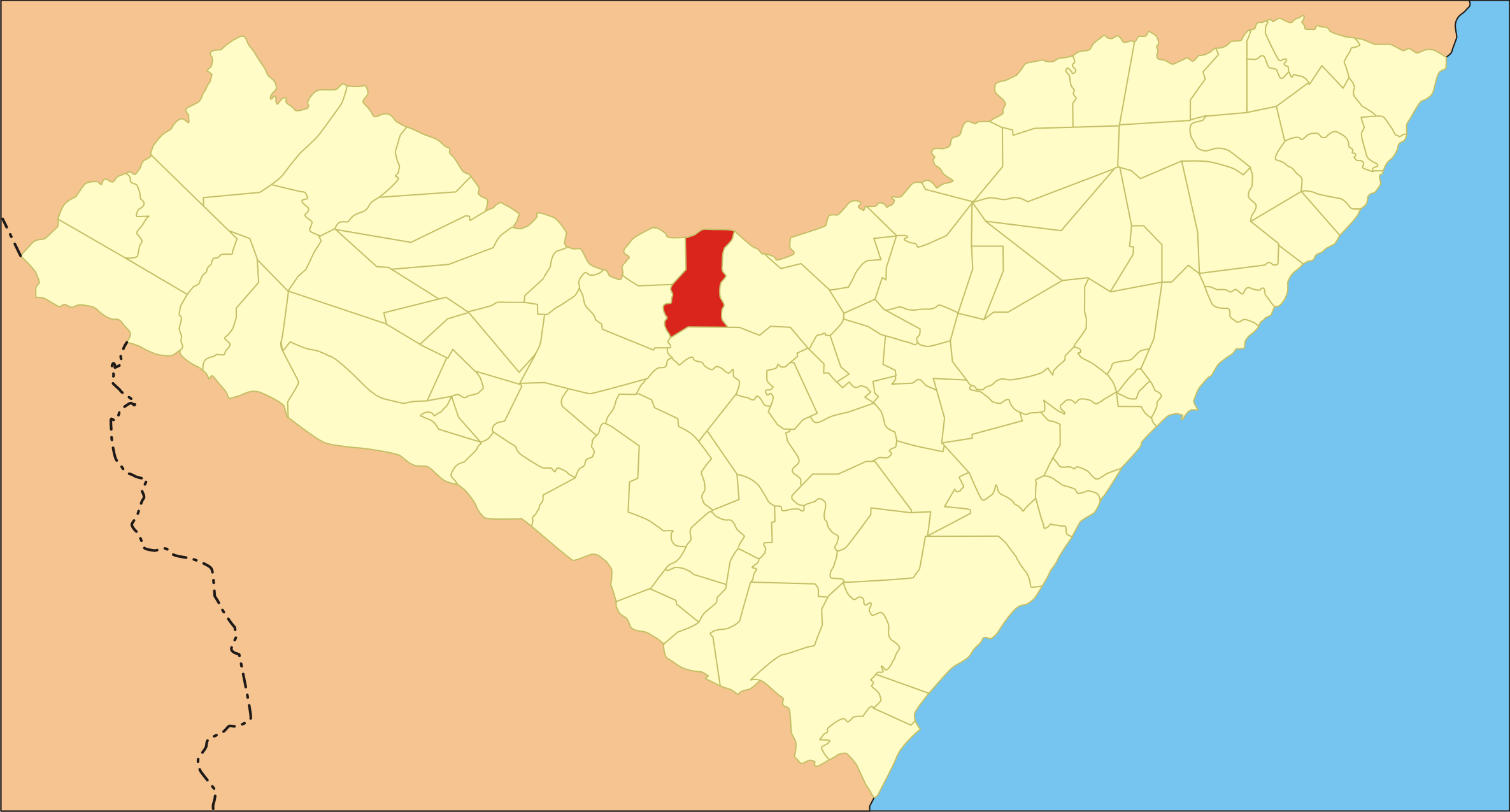
- Location of Estrela de Alagoas in Alagoas

- Location within Brazil Location within South America
- Coordinates: 9°23′24″S 36°45′36″W
- Country: Brazil
- Region: Northeast
- State: Alagoas
- Founded: 5 October 1992

Government
  - Mayor: Roberto Ferreira Wanderley (MDB) (2025-2028)
  - Vice Mayor: Cicero Pinheiro da Silva (MDB) (2025-2028)

Area
  - Total: 260.772 km^{2} (100.685 sq mi)
- Elevation: 324 m (1,063 ft)

Population (2022)
  - Total: 15,429
  - Density: 59.17/km^{2} (153.2/sq mi)
- Demonym: Estrelense (Brazilian Portuguese)
- Time zone: UTC-03:00 (Brasília Time)
- Postal code: 57625-000
- HDI (2010): 0.534 – low
- Website: estreladealagoas.al.gov.br

Estrela de Alagoas (Central northeastern portuguese pronunciation: [iʃˈtɾelɐ ˈdi ˈɐlɐˈɡoɐs]) is a municipality located in the west of the Brazilian state of Alagoas. Its population is 18,255 (2020) and its area is 264 km^{2} (102 sq mi).

== See also ==
- List of municipalities in Alagoas
