= Alagoa, Minas Gerais =

Town and municipality in the state of Minas Gerais, Brazil

Coordinates: 22°10′S 44°38′W

- Municipality
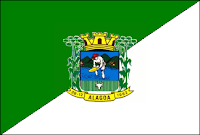
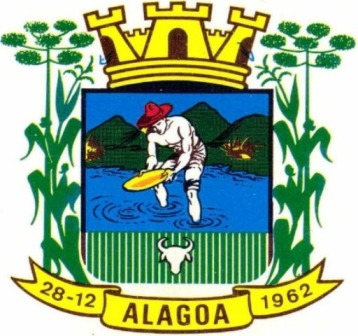
- Flag Coat of arms
- Interactive map of Alagoa, Minas Gerais
- Country: Brazil
- State: Minas Gerais
- Region: Southeast
- Time zone: UTC−3 (BRT)

Location of Alagoa

Alagoa is a city in the Brazilian state of Minas Gerais. In 2020 its population was estimated to be 2,665.

Alagoa was founded on 28 December 1962.

Turned into a municipality in 1962, the village of Alagoa was born by the Bandeirantes in the 18th century. It was part of the "Royal Road" to move gold and precious gems (including diamonds) from the State of Minas Gerais to Rio de Janeiro and São Paulo seaports.

The municipality contains 5.38% of the 22,917 hectares (56,630 acres) Serra do Papagaio State Park, created in 1998. On top of the Mantiqueira Mountains (The Crying Mountain, in the local Indians language), it contains part of the most important remains of the Brazilian Atlantic Forest and fresh water drained from the mountains to the State of Minas Gerais valleys.

== See also ==
- List of municipalities in Minas Gerais
