= Oliveira, Minas Gerais =

Oliveira
- Municipality
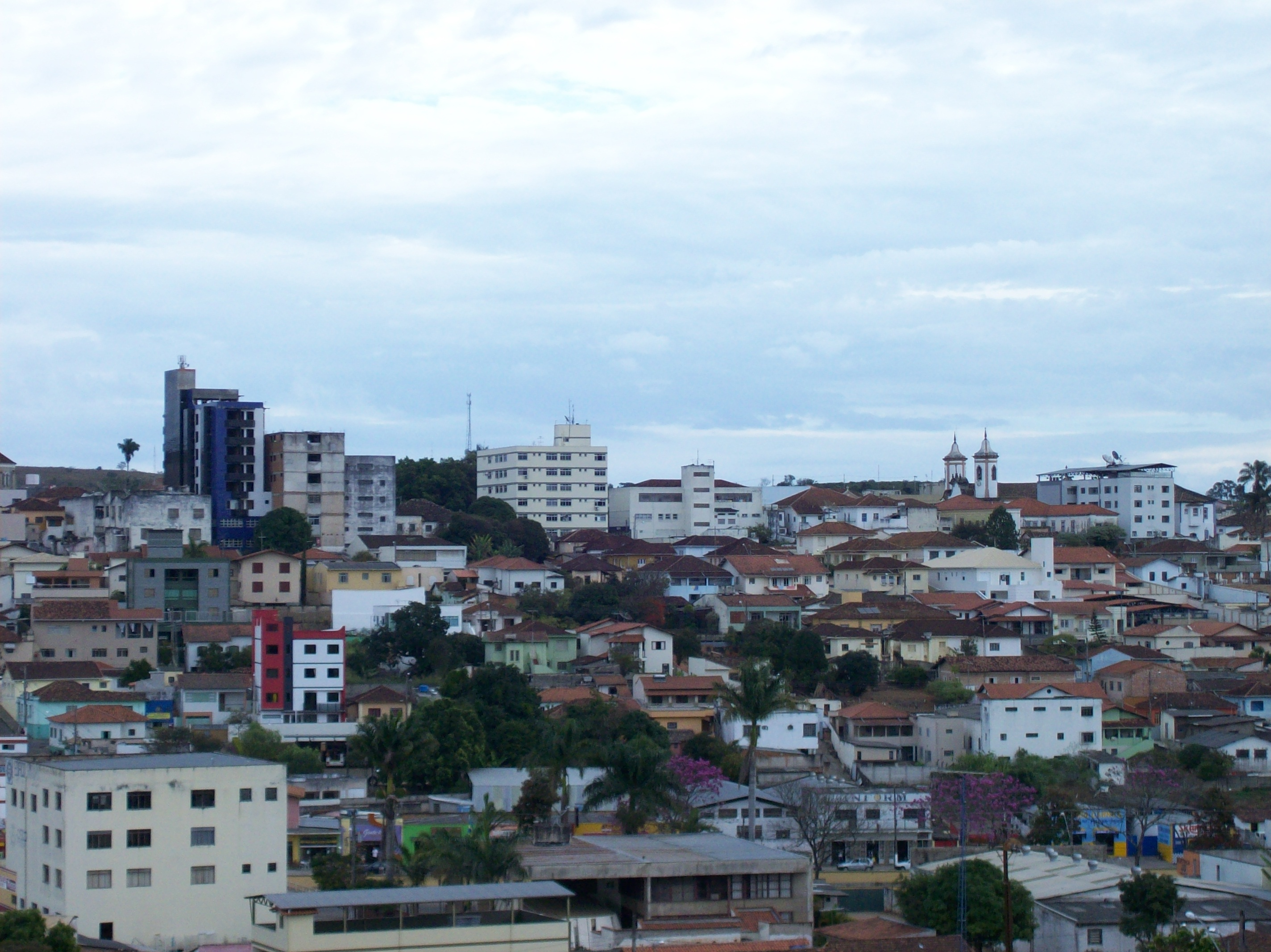
- View of Oliveira

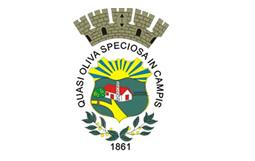
- Flag Coat of arms
- Nickname: "Princesa do Oeste" - "Princess of the West"
- Motto: "Quasi Oliva Speciosa in Campis" - "As a beautiful olive tree in the fields"
- Location of Oliveira in the State of Minas Gerais

- Location in Brazil
- Coordinates: 20°41′45″S 44°49′37″W
- Country: Brazil
- Region: Southeast
- State: Minas Gerais
- Established: 19 September 1861

Government
  - Mayor: João Batista de Sousa

Area
  - Total: 896,494 km^{2} (346,138 sq mi)
- Elevation: 982 m (3,222 ft)

Population (2022 Census)
  - Total: 39,262
  - Estimate (2025): 40,576
- Time zone: UTC−3 (BRT)
- GDP: 401,175 mil
- GDP per capita: 10,164.31
- Website: Prefeitura Municipal de Oliveira

Other information
CEP	35540-000
County	Oliveira
Demonym	Oliveirense
Aldermans	9
Voters	31,281 (2012)
Economically Active Population	17,642 (2000)
Gini index	0.43
HDI	0.770
GDP	401,175 thousand
GDP Per Capita	10,164.31 IBGE/2010

Oliveira is a Brazilian municipality in the state of Minas Gerais. It is located at latitude 20º41'47" south and longitude 44º49'38" west, at an altitude of 982 metres. It is located 165 kilometres at southwest from Belo Horizonte. Its estimated population was 41,181 according to the latest IBGE census.

Oliveira is the birthplace of Brazilian scientist Carlos Chagas. A person from Oliveira can be called "Oliveirense".

== History ==
Oliveira's history begins around the middle of the 16th century. Portuguese travellers used to stop in Oliveira's region, when travelling towards Goiás, through the "Picada de Goiás" or "Caminho de Goiás" (Path of Goiás). From this small village emerged the city. It used to have considerable political importance and regional hegemony during the Brazilian Empire.

Some stories say that a disease outbreak in the region of Mariana was also responsible for a great migration to Oliveira. The village of Oliveira used to belong to the village of São José do Rio das Mortes, which is the current Tiradentes (Minas Gerais), and it already possessed a chapel in 1758. The village was raised to the title of parish on July 14, 1832, and then raised to a town, on March 16, 1839, by the provincial law nº 134. Finally, it was lifted to the title of city on September 19, 1861. Differently than other cities in the same region, such as Ouro Preto and São João Del Rei, Oliveira did not emerge due to the exploration of gold and diamond, instead, the development of livestock and agriculture activities were the main reasons. Such activities began with the Bandeirantes that started to migrate from São Paulo to the countryside of Minas Gerais. During the transition from village to city, the municipality had always stood as a strategic place for goods exchange and capital flow, as it was an important path for travellers. Therefore, all these reasons were responsible for the rapidly growth of the municipality at that time. After the end of slavery in Brazil, the Brazilian government stimulated the immigration. Oliveira received Syrian and Lebanese settlers, who managed the commerce activities. Moreover, the city had a very strong Portuguese influence, mainly in architecture.

There are two versions about the origin of the Oliveira's name. There are stories that the first inhabitants of the region found some olive trees. Therefore, they named the place "Oliveiras" that later would be simplified to Oliveira. However, there is a rumor that a Portuguese woman, called Dona Maria de Oliveira, used to live in the region during the second half of the 18th century. She used to live in a house in the region where Oliveira currently exists, when the first Bandeirantes started to travel towards Goiás. Therefore, Oliveira was named because of her surname.

In the beginning of the 20th century, the city became known around the world, as it was the birthplace of the famous scientist Carlos Chagas. He discovered the Chagas disease and he was the pioneer in the research of diseases caused by protozoa. He was also indicated to the Nobel Prize in the beginning of the 20th century in Germany.

== Geography ==
Oliveira is located at latitude 20º41'45" south and longitude 44º49'37" west. It is located at the mesoregion called Campos das Vertentes and the average altitude is 982 meters. Politically, it is part of the West of the state of Minas Gerais, even though it is geographically located at the southwest of the state. The estimated population in 2006 was 40,966 according to the PNUD, and 41,181 in 2013 according to IBGE. Besides the main city, Oliveira also possess the district of Morro do Ferro, which consists on an approximate population of 1,500 inhabitants. Morro do Ferro is located at 35 kilometers from Oliveira's city centre. The whole municipality's area is 896,494 km^{2}.

Oliveira is the sixth most populous city in the West of Minas Gerais. It is the 80º most populous city of the state and 289º most populous city amos the Southeast of Brazil. It is currently attempting to become an important industrial hub.

Oliveira is located near the main urban agglomeration of the southeast of Brazil and the other important cities of the state of Minas Gerais. List of cities and the distance (in kilometers) to Oliveira:

- Belo Horizonte: 150 km
- Brasília: 810 km
- Buenos Aires: 2640 km
- Campinas: 430 km
- Carangola: 413 km
- Curitiba: 840 km
- Divinópolis: 73 km
- Itaúna: 110 km
- Juiz de Fora: 250 km
- Lavras: 90 km
- Ouro Fino: 307 km
- Petrópolis: 360 km
- Poços de Caldas: 295 km
- Pouso Alegre: 245 km
- Ribeirão Preto: 410 km
- Rio de Janeiro: 420 km
- São João Del Rey: 99 km
- São Paulo: 440 km
- Três Corações: 154 km
- Uberlândia: 520 km
- Varginha: 170 km

Oliveira is also the name of the political microregion of Oliveira (Microrregião de Oliveira), which also includes other eight municipalities located in the south of the West of Minas Gerais. The microregion of Oliveira is bordered by the microregions of São João Del Rei, Lavras, Divinópolis, Conselheiro Lafaiete, Formiga, Itaguara e Campo Belo. Therefore, it is a place of confluence in the West of Minas Gerais, the Metropolitan Area of Belo Horizonte, the South of Minas Gerais and the Campos das Vertentes.

List of the municipalities in the microregion of Oliveira (sorted by size of population/IBGE 2013):

- Oliveira: 41,181
- Carmópolis de Minas: 18,205
- Santo Antônio do Amparo: 18,162
- Bom Sucesso: 17,805
- Carmo da Mata: 11,382
- Passa Tempo: 8,377
- São Francisco de Paula: 6,666
- Piracema: 6,575
- Ibituruna: 2,979

=== Climate ===
As Oliveira is located in a very steep terrain, field and surrounded by mountains, it has a Köppen climate classification, or a tropical climate of altitude. Compared to the average of Brazil's climate, it can be considered a cold city. The average temperature is around 19 °C. The minimum temperature ever registered in Oliveira was -1 °C on July 18, 1926, and the maximum temperature ever registered was 34 °C on January 8, 1930 (shadow temperature). The trend for the current climate has been the decrease of maximum temperatures and the increase of minimum temperatures. The climate is temperate, which is the same in almost all cities in the southeast and south of Minas Gerais. The annually rainfall is around 1550 mm.

The average temperature during 24 hour period
Season	Average Temperature (in Celsius)
Spring	20.10 °C
Summer	21.57 °C
Fall	16.82 °C
Winter	19.67 °C
Annual	19.54 °C

Climate data for Oliveira, Minas Gerais - Brasil
Month	Jan	Feb	Mar	Apr	May	Jun	Jul	Aug	Sep	Oct	Nov	Dec	Year
Mean daily maximum °C (°F)	28.3 (82.9)	27.9 (82.2)	27.9 (82.2)	26.5 (79.7)	25.4 (77.7)	24.6 (76.3)	24.5 (76.1)	26.5 (79.7)	26.5 (79.7)	27.9 (82.2)	27.8 (82.0)	27.7 (81.9)	26.8 (80.2)
Mean daily minimum °C (°F)	17.9 (64.2)	17.8 (64.0)	17.1 (62.8)	15.1 (59.2)	12.7 (54.9)	10.8 (51.4)	9.8 (49.6)	11.4 (52.5)	13.8 (56.8)	15.8 (60.4)	16.7 (62.1)	17.5 (63.5)	14.7 (58.5)
Average precipitation mm (inches)	265.8 (10.46)	212.2 (8.35)	187.5 (7.38)	70.0 (2.76)	25.0 (0.98)	18.2 (0.72)	11.6 (0.46)	14.6 (0.57)	58.4 (2.30)	133.6 (5.26)	204.8 (8.06)	320.0 (12.60)	1,521.7 (59.9)

=== Hydrography ===
Oliveira's territory lies near the headwaters of two major river basins: the Platina and Sanfranciscana basins. Oliveira is part of the Platina basin. The main rivers supplying water to the city are the Lambari River and the Jacaré River, a tributary of the Grande River.

=== Topography and vegetation ===
Oliveira's territory is situated in a region that can be considered as an extension of the Mantiqueira Mountains. The city is located on a set of hills at an average altitude of 1000 meters above sea level. The topography is divided in:

Topography (%) Plain: 5 undulating: 70 Mountainous: 25 Maximum altitude: 1209 meters Minimum altitude: 910 meters

Oliveira's vegetation is composed predominantly by Cerrado and Temperate Grasslands. Temperate Grasslands are mainly consisted of grasses and can be found in the higher altitudes of Oliveira.

== Infrastructure ==
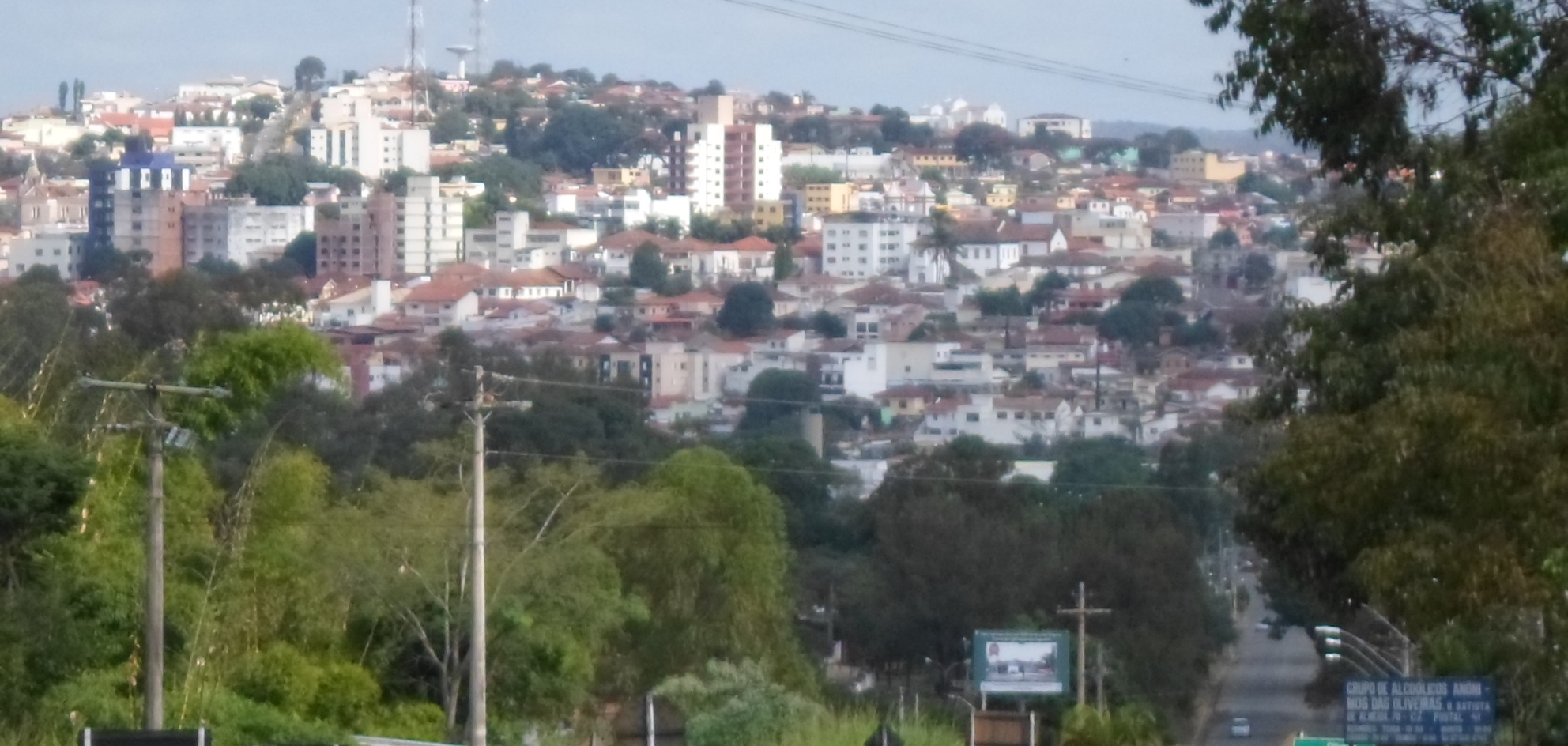
City's Centre.

Oliveira is known for having a vast urban infrastructure. It has the most successful First Aid Post (Emergency Department) of the Middle-West of Minas Gerais, which has been opened. Oliveira's architecture has a clearly Iberian Influence and it is visibly the most European-like city in the region. Such architecture is highly expressed in the great 19th-century mansions, statues, monuments spread along the city. Its squares and avenues are well decorated and its buildings are ornate, such as Our Lady of Oliveira Cathedral (Catedral de Nossa Senhora de Oliveira), which is based on Roman Gothic style and the old Matriz Church built in baroque style during the 18th century. Furthermore, there are several modern buildings in the city.

=== Highways ===
Oliveira is located at a strategic place and it is crossed by three important federal and state highways:

- BR-494
- BR-369
- BR-381

=== Railroads ===
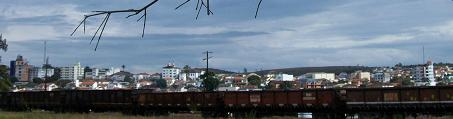
Centro-Atlantic Railroad passing through the city.

The Centro-Atlantic Railroad (Ferrovia Centro-Atlântica) passes through Oliveira and links interior areas of Brazil to the coast.

=== Airport ===
Oliveira has an airport, which runway is 1,180 meters length and 20 meters width. It can receive small and middle sized airplanes. There is also a terminal for boarding and arrivals.

== Subdivisions ==
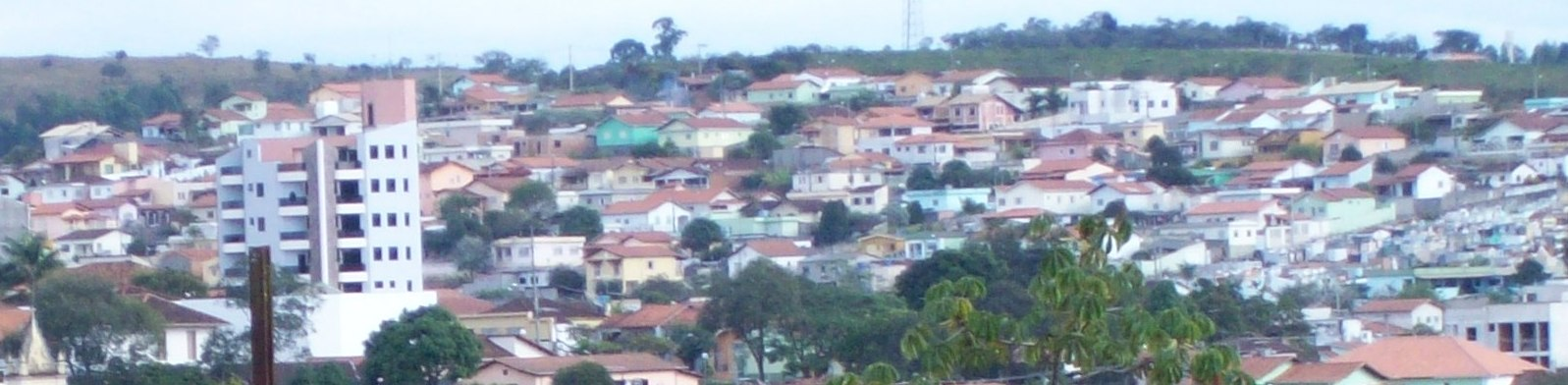
Acácio Ribeiro Neighborhood, traditional middle-class neighborhood

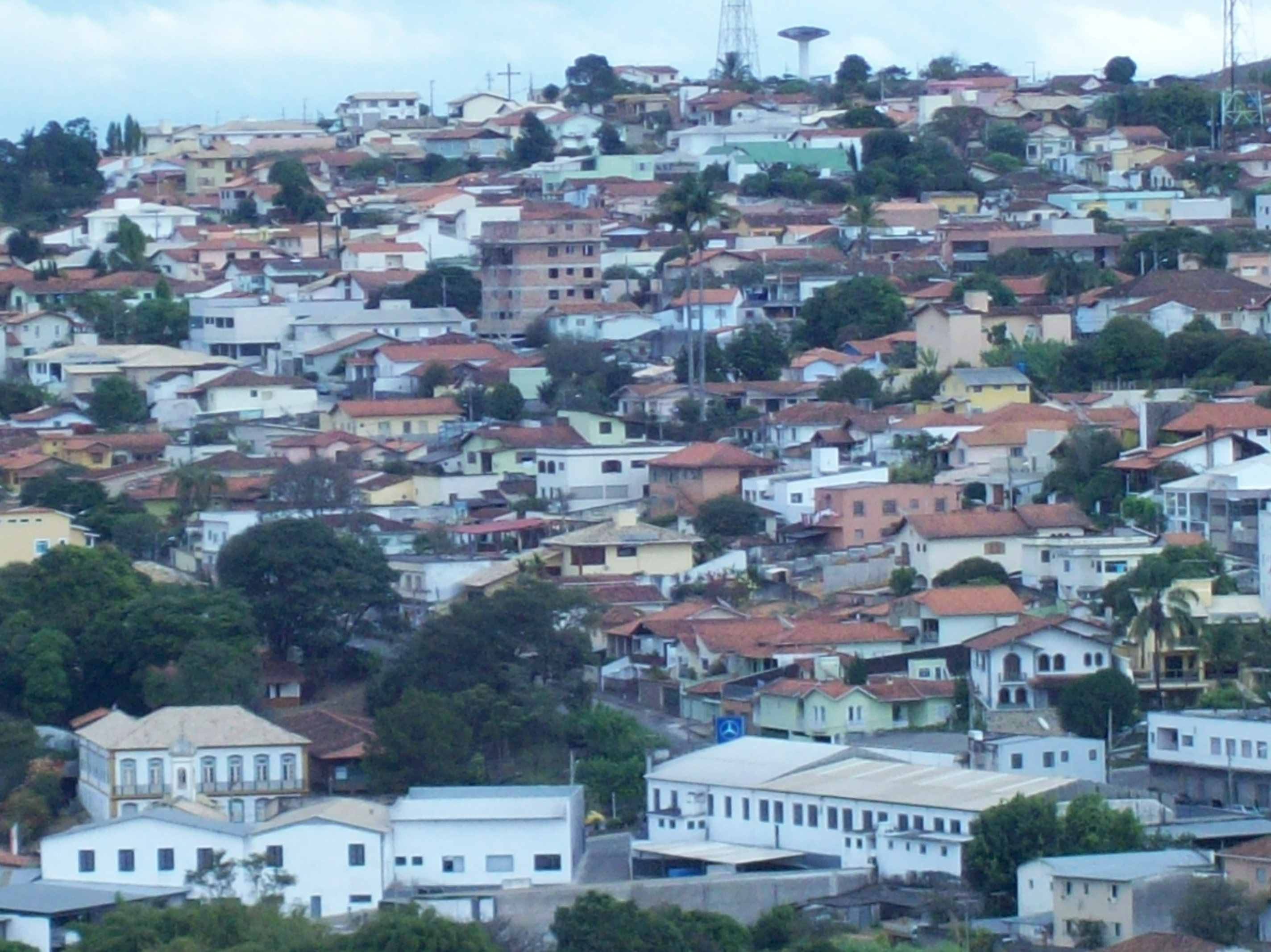
Dona Sinhaninha Neighborhood, middle class area

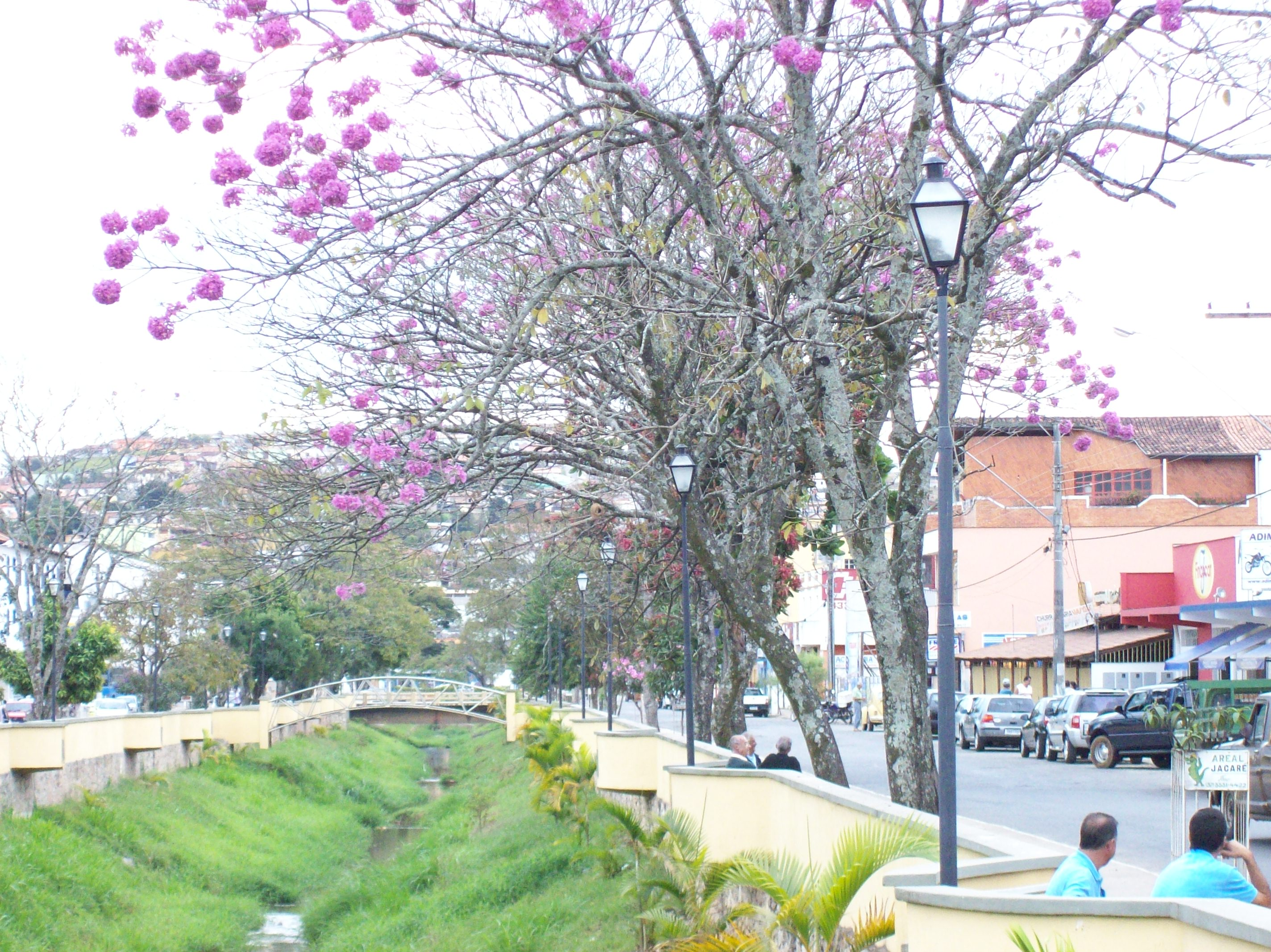
Boulevard Jacéa Abi-Ackel.

Oliveira's urban area can be divided into 51 neighborhoods, where there are more than 550 streets. The neighborhoods are:

- São Sebastião
- Acácio Ribeiro
- Acácio Ribeiro II
- Acácio Ribeiro III
- Centro
- Sinhaninha
- Rosário
- Santo Antônio
- Aparecida
- Caetano Mascarenhas
- Dona Zica
- Dom Bosco
- Doutor From
- COHAB João Paulo II
- São Geraldo
- Jardim Panorâmico I
- Jardim Panorâmico II
- Eldorado
- Novo Eldorado
- Santo Antônio
- Barro Preto
- Triângulo
- Cristo Redentor
- Santa Maria
- Segredo
- Graças
- Domingos Ribeiro
- Areões
- Distrito Industrial
- Cíntia
- Vila Progresso
- Cabrais
- Pedra Negra
- Santa Luzia
- Condomínio Rocha Costa
- COHAB Elias Raimundo
- Maria Amélia
- Aldeia São Vicente
- Arthur Henrique de Melo
- São Bernardo
- Jardim dos Bandeirantes
- Retiro das Pedras
- Oscar Faria Lobato
- Novo Horizonte
- Condomínio Vila Rica
- Distrito Industrial
- Vale do Sol
- São Dimas
- Bela Vista
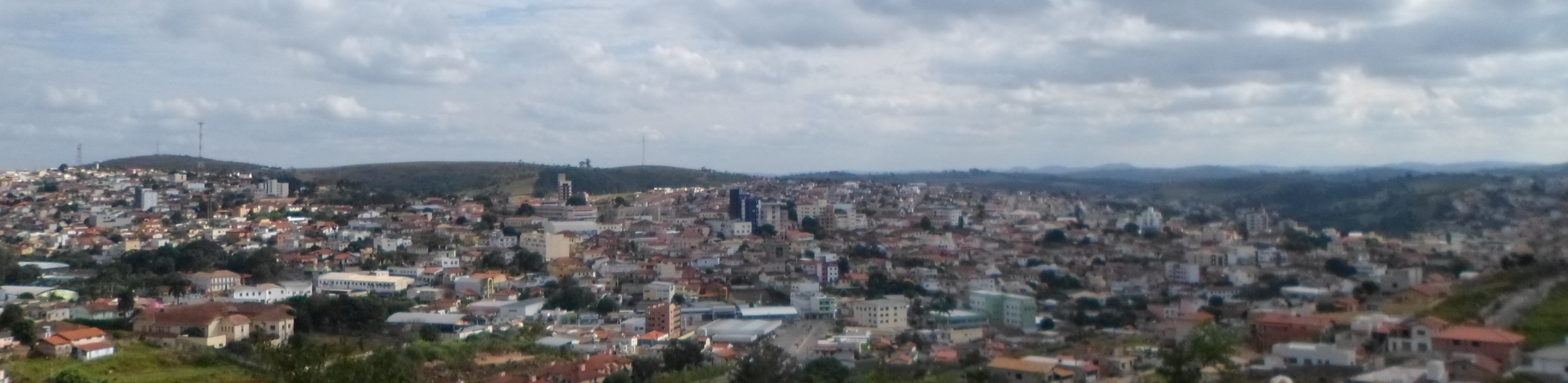
View of the whole city of Oliveira.

== Society ==
=== Social demographic indicators ===
Municipality's social indicators in 2000

- Growth rate: 1.50%
- Life expectancy at birth (years): 72.00
- Education Index (IDFM-E): 0.841
- Longevity Index (IDHM-L): 0.783
- Income Index (IDHM-R): 0.686
- Human Development Index: 0.770
- State Ranking (Minas Gerais State): 164° (among 853 municipalities)
- Region's Ranking (Southeast of Brazil): 611° (among 1666 municipalities)
- National Ranking: 1315° (among 5507 municipalities)
- Adult literacy rate: 90.39% (2000)
- Population: 41.181 (80° among 853 municipalities in Minas Gerais/2013)

=== Population growth ===
- 1970: 26,502
- 1980: 29,586
- 1991: 32,222
- 2000: 37,250
- 2010: 39,469
- 2013: 41,181

Aging is a remarkable fact about Oliveira's population. It is happening earlier and in a faster rate than it has been predicted for Brazilian Population in general. There are several reasons for this fact, but it can mainly attributed to the small birth and death rates in the city. According to the IBGE's census, Oliveira's population presents a faster aging process than the average of the state of Minas Gerais and the rest of the country.

== Economy ==
Oliveira's economy is mainly based on services sector (Tertiary sector). In the industrial sector (Secondary), two main industries can be highlighted: Baptista de Almeida (Candy and Caramel Factory Santa Rita) and Kromberg & Schubert (a German multinational company). The GDP division per economy sectors show that half of gross domestic product is generated by services sector. Industry comprises around a third of the city's economy, while the primary sector is only responsible by 17% of the city's economy.

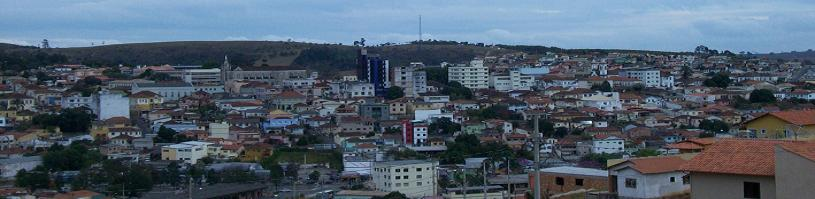
The main economic activity of the municipality is based on the tertiary sector. In the past few decades, there has been an effort to become an industrial centre.

GDP division by sectors

- Primary (agriculture and livestock farming): 17%
- Secondary (Industry): 33%
- Tertiary (Services): 50%

Between 2005 and 2012, Oliveira has had an astronomic economic and social growth. The urban structure and modernization can also be highlighted. In a recent study that has mapped the misery concentration in Brazil, it could be seen that the proportion of people that could be considered miserable in Oliveira is not even 1.5%, which is far lower than the national average that is 8.5% of the entire population. Oliveira is also located in a very dynamic and richest region in the state of Minas Gerais. Furthermore, Oliveira is placed in the top average monthly income per capita when compared with the surrounding municipalities. The following table show this information:

Average Monthly Income per capita
City	Average Monthly Income (Reais)
1º Oliveira	R$653.61
2º Campo Belo	R$647.36
3º Cláudio	R$639.46
4º Itapecerica	R$608.81
5º Carmo da Mata	R$591.77
6º Carmópolis de minas	R$581.83
7º Bom Sucesso	R$567.02
8º Santo Antônio do Amparo	R$459.30
9º São Francisco de Paula	R$460.94

== Religion ==
A traditional Oliveirense is a religious person. As Oliveira's history is highly based on the Iberian culture brought by its Portuguese settlers, Roman Catholicism is predominant in the city. However, other religions with fewer followers are also present in the city.

=== Catholicism ===
According to IBGE's census in 2010, there are 34,938 Catholics in Oliveira, which is around 84% of the population.

As said before, a traditional Oliveirense is a religious person. Roman Catholicism was brought by Portuguese settlers and it is still predominant in the city. This tradition led to the creation of the Diocese of Oliveira in 1941.

The Diocese of Oliveira was created on December 20, 1941, by Pope Pius XII (Bula Quo uberiores fructus), as a result of the dismemberment of Belo Horizonte's Archdiocese. The diocese is located in the mid-south region of the state of Minas Gerais bordering the dioceses of Campanha, Divinópolis, Luz and São João del Rei and the archdioceses of Belo Horizonte and Mariana. The entire territory is almost 8.000 km^{2} with a population of 300 thousand believers. In total, there are 28 parishes distributed in Oliveira's surroundings municipalities: Aguanil, Bom Sucesso, Campo Belo, Cana Verde, Candeias, Carmo da Mata, Carmópolis de Minas, Cristais, Desterro de Entre Rios, Itaguara, Oliveira, Passa Tempo, Perdões, Piracema, Ribeirão Vermelho, Santana do Jacaré, Santo Antônio do Amparo, São Francisco de Paula and São Tiago.

=== Other religions ===
Although most of Oliveira's population is catholic, there are other religions with fewer believers. According to IBGE's census in 2010, other religious such as Kardecists, Evangelicals also have considerable number of believers. People without any religion can also be found in the city. The following list summarizes the number of believers in some minor religions in the city:

Minor Religions

- Evangelicals: 3,373
- Kardecists: 398
- No Religion: 324 (62 atheists)
- Jehovah's Witnesses: 179
- Buddhism: 22
- Umbanda e Candomblé: 13

== Administration ==
The current administration of the municipality can be seen in the list below:

- Mayor: João da Batista de Sousa (2013/2016)
- Deputy Mayor: Salatiel Alvim Lobato
- President of the City Council Chamber: Leonardo Ananias Leão
- Deputy President of the City Council Chamber: Francisco José Ribeiro Filho

== Culture ==
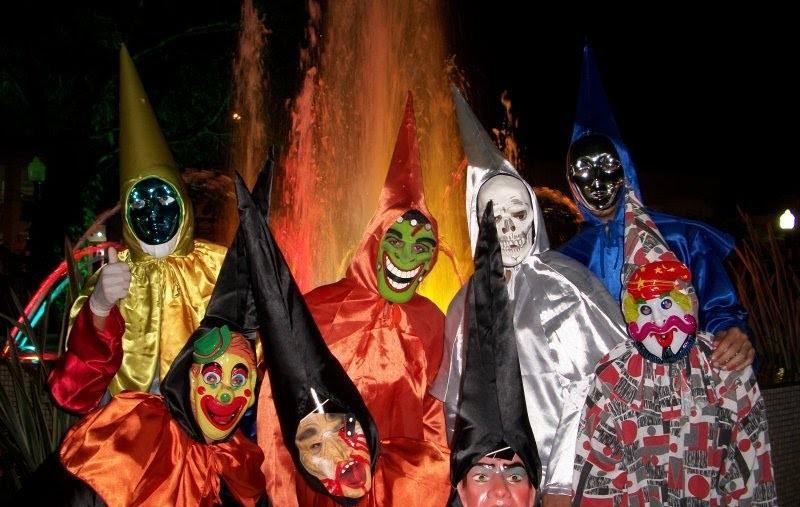
"Cainágua", centennial tradition in Oliveira's Carnaval.

The most famous cultural manifestation in the city is the Carnival(Carnaval Party). Oliveira's Carnaval is one of the most famous in Minas Gerais. The main figure of the city's Carnaval is the "Cainágua", which literally means "fall into the water" or someone who falls into the water. It is said that the "Caináguas" are an adaption of the masked figures in Venice's Carnaval. In Oliveira, the "Caináguas" were created from old roleplays where people wore masks to become unrecognizable during the party, so it would allow the party goers to get in touch with any other kind of people.

Another important feature of Oliveira's Carnaval is the group "Pelo amor de Deus", which literally means "For God's sake". The group was created by José Alberto Machado da Silva, followed by Maurício Almeida. The group usually party in Oliveira's city centre in the Friday night during Carnaval celebrations. Each "folião" (Carnaval goer) dresses a different costume to party with the group.

The municipality has a strong cultural identity, which was constantly built over two centuries of existence. It was largely influenced by Portuguese culture and other people that immigrated to Brazil. Those people built a series of cultural events in the city. Therefore, the Carnaval party, the Holy Week and the Congado are some of this events throughout the year.

== Tourism ==
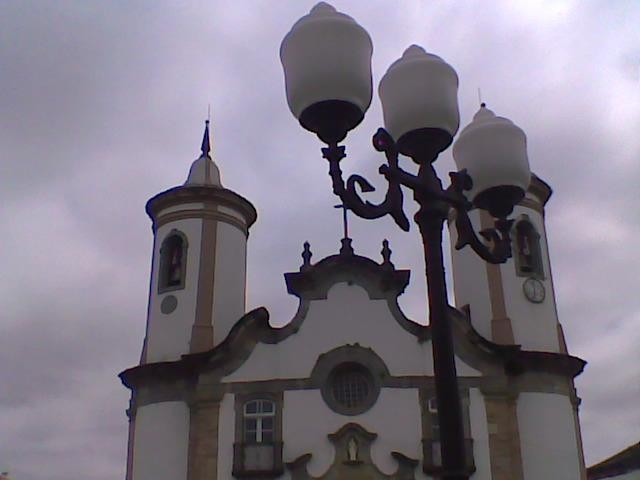
Matriz Church in Baroque style built by the Portuguese settlers in the 18th century. One of the few ones to possess two circular steeples.

The main touristic attractions in Oliveira are:

- A Grande Estátua do Cristo Redentor (Big Statue of Christ Redempteur)
- Casa de Cultura Carlos Chagas (Carlos Chagas Culture House)
- Antiga Igreja Matriz (Matriz Church, which was built in Baroque style)

The urban aspect of Oliveira is very traditional and impress visitors. For instance, the Boulevard that surrounds the city, the gardens and the plazas. Recently, the main city centre has been protected by the Instituto Estadual do Patrimônio Histórico e Artístico de Minas Gerais (IEPHA/MG). The main city centre still maintain several buildings from the 19th century, most of them in good conservation state.

== Famous Oliveirenses ==
- Áureo Ameno
- Carlos Chagas
- Eliseu Resende
- Emílio Haddad Filho
- Fernando Mitre
- José Maria Pinto
- José Oiticica
- Maurício Chagas Bicalho
- Nelson Ferreira Leite
- Olavo Romano
- Paulo Pinheiro Chagas
- Paulo Roberto Haddad
- Silvio Carvalho Mitre
- Werley Ananias da Silva
- Gabriel de Andrade Janot Pacheco
- Alberto Valentim
