= Miguel Ângelo Freitas Ribeiro =

Brazilian Roman Catholic bishop (born 1958)

The Most Reverend Miguel Ângelo Freitas Ribeiro
- Bishop Emeritus of Oliveira
- Church: Catholic Church
- Diocese: Oliveira
- Appointed: 31 October 2007
- Installed: 6 December 2007
- Term ended: 7 October 2026
- Predecessor: Jésus Rocha
- Successor: Antônio Carlos Paiva
- Previous post: Bishop of Tocantinópolis (2001–2007)

Orders
- Ordination: 11 January 1986 by Francisco Barroso Filho
- Consecration: 31 March 2001 by Francisco Barroso Filho

Personal details
- Born: 26 November 1958 (age 67) Itaguara, Minas Gerais, Brazil
- Education: Federal University of Minas Gerais; Pontifical Catholic University of Minas Gerais
- Motto: Deus providebit
- Coat of arms

Miguel Ângelo Freitas Ribeiro (born 26 November 1958) is a Brazilian Roman Catholic prelate who served as the Bishop of Oliveira from 2007 until his resignation was accepted in 2026. He previously served as the Bishop of Tocantinópolis from 2001 to 2007. Following the acceptance of his resignation, he became bishop emeritus of Oliveira.

== Early life and priesthood ==
Ribeiro was born in Itaguara, in the state of Minas Gerais, Brazil, on 26 November 1958. He studied philosophy at the Federal University of Minas Gerais and theology at the Pontifical Catholic University of Minas Gerais in Belo Horizonte. He also obtained a degree in letters from the Federal University of Minas Gerais. He was ordained a priest for the Diocese of Oliveira on 11 January 1986.

During his priestly ministry, Ribeiro served as a parish priest, spiritual director of the Cursillos of Christianity, director of the diocesan seminary, rector of the minor seminary São José, diocesan pastoral adviser, president of the diocesan Commission for Sacred Art, and a member of the College of Consultors.

== Episcopate ==
=== Bishop of Tocantinópolis ===
On 17 January 2001, Pope John Paul II appointed Ribeiro Bishop of Tocantinópolis in the state of Tocantins. At the time of his appointment he was a priest of the Diocese of Oliveira and parish priest of Nossa Senhora Aparecida.

He received his episcopal consecration on 31 March 2001. His principal consecrator was Francisco Barroso Filho, Bishop of Oliveira, with Alberto Taveira Corrêa, Archbishop of Palmas, and José Belisário da Silva, O.F.M., Bishop of Bacabal, serving as principal co-consecrators.

His episcopal motto was Deus providebit ("God will provide").

Ribeiro remained Bishop of Tocantinópolis until his transfer to Oliveira in 2007.

=== Bishop of Oliveira ===
On 31 October 2007, Pope Benedict XVI appointed Ribeiro Bishop of Oliveira. He took possession of the Diocese of Oliveira on 6 December 2007.

During his episcopate, Ribeiro participated in the activities of the National Conference of Bishops of Brazil (CNBB), including work within its regional structures. He also served in pastoral and ecclesial initiatives connected with the Diocese of Oliveira.

=== Resignation ===
On 7 October 2026, Pope Leo XIV accepted Ribeiro's resignation from the pastoral government of the Diocese of Oliveira. He was succeeded by Antônio Carlos Paiva.
