= Diocese of Tocantinópolis =

Catholic ecclesiastical territory

Diocese of Tocantinópolis Dioecesis Tocantinopolitanus Diocese de Tocantinópolis

Catholic

Location
- Country: Brazil
- Metropolitan: Archdiocese of Palmas
- Headquarters: Tocantinópolis, Tocantins, Brazil

Statistics
- Area: 15,761 km^{2} (6,085 sq mi)
- Population: Total; Catholics: (as of 2023); 214,313; 214,313 (70.0%)
- Parishes: 16

Information
- Denomination: Catholic Church
- Sui iuris church: Latin Church
- Rite: Roman Rite
- Established: 20 December 1954; 71 years ago
- Cathedral: Catedral Nossa Senhora da Consolação
- Patron saint: Our Lady of Consolation
- Secular priests: 17 (14 Diocesan, 3 Religious Orders)

Current leadership
- Pope: Leo XIV
- Bishop: Carlos Henrique Silva Oliveira
- Metropolitan Archbishop: Pedro Brito Guimarães

Website
- diocesedetocantinopolis.org.br

The Roman Catholic Diocese of Tocantinópolis (Latin: Dioecesis Tocantinopolitanus) is a diocese located in the city of Tocantinópolis in the ecclesiastical province of Palmas in Brazil.

== History ==
- 20 December 1954: Established as Territorial Prelature of Tocantinópolis from the Diocese of Porto Nacional
- 30 October 1980: Promoted as Diocese of Tocantinópolis
- 31 January 2023: Lost territories to establish the Diocese of Araguaína

== Bishops ==
Prelates of Tocantinópolis (Roman Rite)

- Cornélio Chizzini, F.D.P. (12 April 1962 – 30 October 1980 see below)

Bishops of Tocantinópolis (Roman rite)

- Cornélio Chizzini, F.D.P. (30 October 1980 – 12 August 1981)
- Aloísio Hilário de Pinho, F.D.P. (9 November 1981 – 22 December 1999), appointed Bishop of Jataí, Goiás
- Miguel Ângelo Freitas Ribeiro (17 January 2001 – 31 October 2007), appointed Bishop of Oliveira, Minas Gerais
- Giovane Pereira de Melo (4 March 2009 – 31 January 2023), appointed Bishop of Araguaína, Tocantins
- Carlos Henrique Silva Oliveira (19 March 2024 – Present)

=== Other priest of this diocese who became bishop ===
- Wellington de Queiroz Vieira (1996-2016), appointed Prelate of Cristalândia, Goiás in 2017
