= Carlos Manuel (footballer, born 2000) =

Brazilian footballer

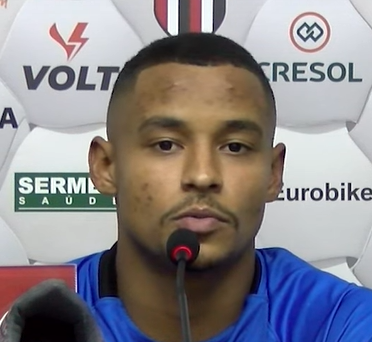
- Carlos Manuel in 2023

Personal information
- Full name: Carlos Manuel de Resende Teodoro
- Date of birth: 18 August 2000 (age 26)
- Place of birth: Passa Tempo, Brazil
- Height: 1.75 m (5 ft 9 in)
- Position: Defensive midfielder

Team information
- Current team: Velo Clube

Youth career
- 2012–2020: Atlético Mineiro

Senior career*
Years	Team	Apps	(Gls)
2021	Aymorés	5	(0)
2021	Contagem	8	(1)
2022	Penapolense	17	(1)
2022	Contagem	3	(0)
2023	Serra Branca	8	(0)
2023–2024	Botafogo-SP	48	(2)
2025–	Velo Clube	4	(0)
- * Club domestic league appearances and goals as of 06:31, 26 January 2025 (UTC)

Carlos Manuel de Resende Teodoro (born 18 August 2000), known as Carlos Manuel or just Carlos, is a Brazilian footballer who plays as a defensive midfielder for Velo Clube.

== Club career ==
Born in Passa Tempo, Minas Gerais, Carlos joined Atlético Mineiro's youth setup in 2012, aged eleven. On 21 May 2021, after finishing his formation, he was announced at Aymorés for the year's Campeonato Mineiro Módulo II.

In September 2021, Carlos was named as a part of Contagem's squad for the 2021 Campeonato Mineiro Segunda Divisão. He started the 2022 season at Penapolense, before returning to Contagem in August of that year.

On 6 December 2022, Carlos agreed to a contract with Serra Branca, and featured regularly during the 2023 Campeonato Paraibano. The following 22 March, he signed for Série B side Botafogo-SP.

On 29 December 2024, Carlos moved to Velo Clube.

== International career ==
Carlos received a call-up for the Brazil under-20 team in 2018, but did not play.

== Career statistics ==
As of 26 January 2025

Club	Season	League			State League		Cup		Continental		Other		Total	
Club	Season	Division	Apps	Goals	Apps	Goals	Apps	Goals	Apps	Goals	Apps	Goals	Apps	Goals
Aymorés	2021	Mineiro Módulo II	—		5	0	—		—		—		5	0
Contagem	2021	Mineiro 2ª Divisão	—		8	1	—		—		—		8	1
Penapolense	2022	Paulista 2ª Divisão	—		17	1	—		—		—		17	1
Contagem	2022	Mineiro 2ª Divisão	—		3	0	—		—		—		3	0
Serra Branca	2023	Paraibano	—		8	0	—		—		—		8	0
Botafogo-SP	2023	Série B	26	1	—		1	0	—		—		27	1
Botafogo-SP	2024	Série B	19	1	9	0	1	0	—		5 (Note: Appearance(s) in Copa Paulista)	0	34	1
Botafogo-SP	Total		45	2	9	0	2	0	—		5	0	61	2
Velo Clube	2025	Paulista	—		4	0	—		—		—		4	0
Career total			45	2	54	1	2	0	0	0	5	0	106	3
