= Benedict D. Coscia =

American friar and Catholic bishop

The Most Reverend Benedict D. Coscia, O.F.M.
- Bishop of Jataí
- Province: Goiânia
- See: Jataí
- Appointed: 8 June 1961
- Term ended: 24 February 1999
- Predecessor: Abel Ribeiro Camelo
- Successor: Miguel Pedro Mundo

Orders
- Ordination: 16 September 1949
- Consecration: 21 September 1961 by Bryan Joseph McEntegart

Personal details
- Born: 10 August 1922 Brooklyn, New York, United States
- Died: April 30, 2008 (aged 85) Goiânia, Goiás, Brazil
- Buried: Catedral Divino Espirito Santo, Jataí, Goiás, Brazil
- Parents: John & Angela Coscia

Benedict D. Coscia, O.F.M. Portuguese: Benedito Domingos Coscia, (10 August 1922 − 30 April 2008) was an American Friar Minor and a Catholic bishop.

== Life ==
=== Early life ===
He was born Vito Coscia in Brooklyn, New York, in 1922 and baptized at the Church of Our Lady, Help of Christians, on Staten Island. He attended Public School 104 in the Fort Hamilton section of Brooklyn for his elementary education (1928-1935) and then Immaculata High School in Manhattan (1935-1939). After graduation, he enrolled at St. Francis College in Brooklyn.

Coscia then felt called to enter the Franciscans. He was admitted as a candidate for Holy Name Province, based in New York City, and entered St. Joseph Seraphic Seminary in Callicoon, New York, where he was admitted to the novitiate and given the religious name of Dominic Coscia. He made his initial profession of religious vows on December 8, 1943. He was then sent to complete his college studies at St. Bonaventure College (1943-1945), followed by seminary studies at Holy Name College in Washington, D.C. (1945-1949). During this same period, he earned a Master's degree in Latin American history (1945-1948). He was ordained to the priesthood on November 6, 1949.

=== Missionary and bishop ===
After his ordination, Coscia immediately volunteered to serve in the missions being established in South America by his province. He was sent to Brazil in 1950, where he assumed the name of Benedict Dominic Coscia to honor Benedict the Moor, a Franciscan friar and saint, whom he greatly revered. He initially served as a parish vicar in Anápolis, Goiás, for seven years. From 1957 to 1961 he then served as a pastor, high school teacher and the Guardian of the community of Friars Minor in Pires do Rio.

In 1961, Coscia was selected to serve as the Bishop of Jataí by Pope John XXIII. His episcopal consecration took place at the Basilica of Our Lady of Perpetual Help in Brooklyn on September 21, 1961. Returning to Brazil, he spent his career as bishop building up church institutions to serve a population scattered throughout the region, both Brazilian farmers and the indigenous population. He worked hard in the social arena, especially health care, personally driving a health van mobile unit himself to the rural zones of his diocese, as well as supervising the establishment and operation of orphanages and daycare centers. During this time, he attended all four sessions of the Second Vatican Council.

== Later life ==
Coscia retired as bishop in 1999 and moved to Goiânia, where he continued to minister to the needy. He died in 2008 and was buried in his former cathedral.
