= BR-369 (Brazil highway) =

Highway of Brazil

BR-369

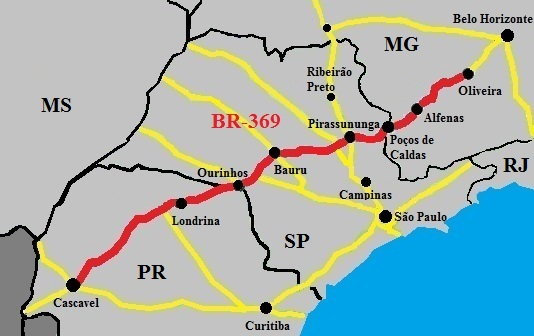
- BR-369

Route information
- Length: 1,232 km (766 mi)

Major junctions
- northeast end: Oliveira, Minas Gerais
- southwest end: Cascavel, Paraná

Location
- Country: Brazil

Highway system
- Highways in Brazil; Federal

BR-369 is a Brazilian federal highway that begins in Oliveira, Minas Gerais and ends in Cascavel in the state of Paraná. The highway also serves the municipalities of Campo Belo, Boa Esperança, and Campos Gerais in Minas Gerais; Pirassununga, Jaú, Bauru, and Ourinhos in the state of São Paulo; and Londrina and Campo Mourão in Paraná.

== Duplications ==
The highway is duplicated in a few parts.

BR-369, as well as BRs 277 and 376, which form a triangle within the state of Paraná, were granted to private companies in 1997, at the beginning of the era of road concessions in Brazil. The contracts are valid until 2021. Initially, 995 km of roads in Paraná should be duplicated, and the population was promised that the State would have First World highways, strongly boosting economic growth. But additions were soon signed that removed duplications and other works from the contracts. The duplication commitment fell from 995 to 616 km. To make matters worse, in 2019, what had been doubled was no more than 300 km, even with toll rates rising every year. The MPF (Federal Public Ministry) then carried out Operation Integration, which showed that the changes made to the contracts are part of a millionaire kickback scheme. The companies paid at least R $ 35 million in fees to achieve these changes in contracts. The estimated diversion of money in the toll system amounts to R $ 8.4 billion. Some of those cited by the MPF to receive these fees are: Jaime Lerner, Roberto Requião and Beto Richa, all former governors of the State of Paraná, and the concessionaires Rodonorte, Econorte, Ecovia, Ecocataratas, Caminhos do Paraná and Viapar.

For the next concession, to take place in 2021, the Federal Government, under the command of Jair Bolsonaro, and the Government of the State of Paraná, under the command of Ratinho Jr., intend, together, adopt a model with lower tariffs.

== History ==
The Grain Highway was created to dispose of the immense agricultural production of Paraná, and in 1963 the sections Maringá - Ourinhos and Uraí - Cornélio Procópio were delivered.

== Economic importance ==
The highway is used for transporting products from agriculture, livestock and industry between the states of Paraná and São Paulo, including soy, corn, coffee, beef and paper, as well as cellulose, wood and furniture.

The highway also connects the western states of Paraná and São Paulo with Paraguay. Paraguay imports most of the products it consumes from Brazil (one of the main promoters of the Paraguayan economy). Therefore, trade and tourism with Paraguay are strong in the region. Foz do Iguaçu and Ciudad del Este benefit directly from the highway.

== Gallery ==
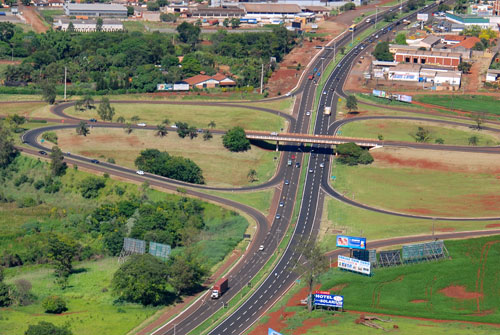
BR-369 between Cambé and Londrina, Paraná.

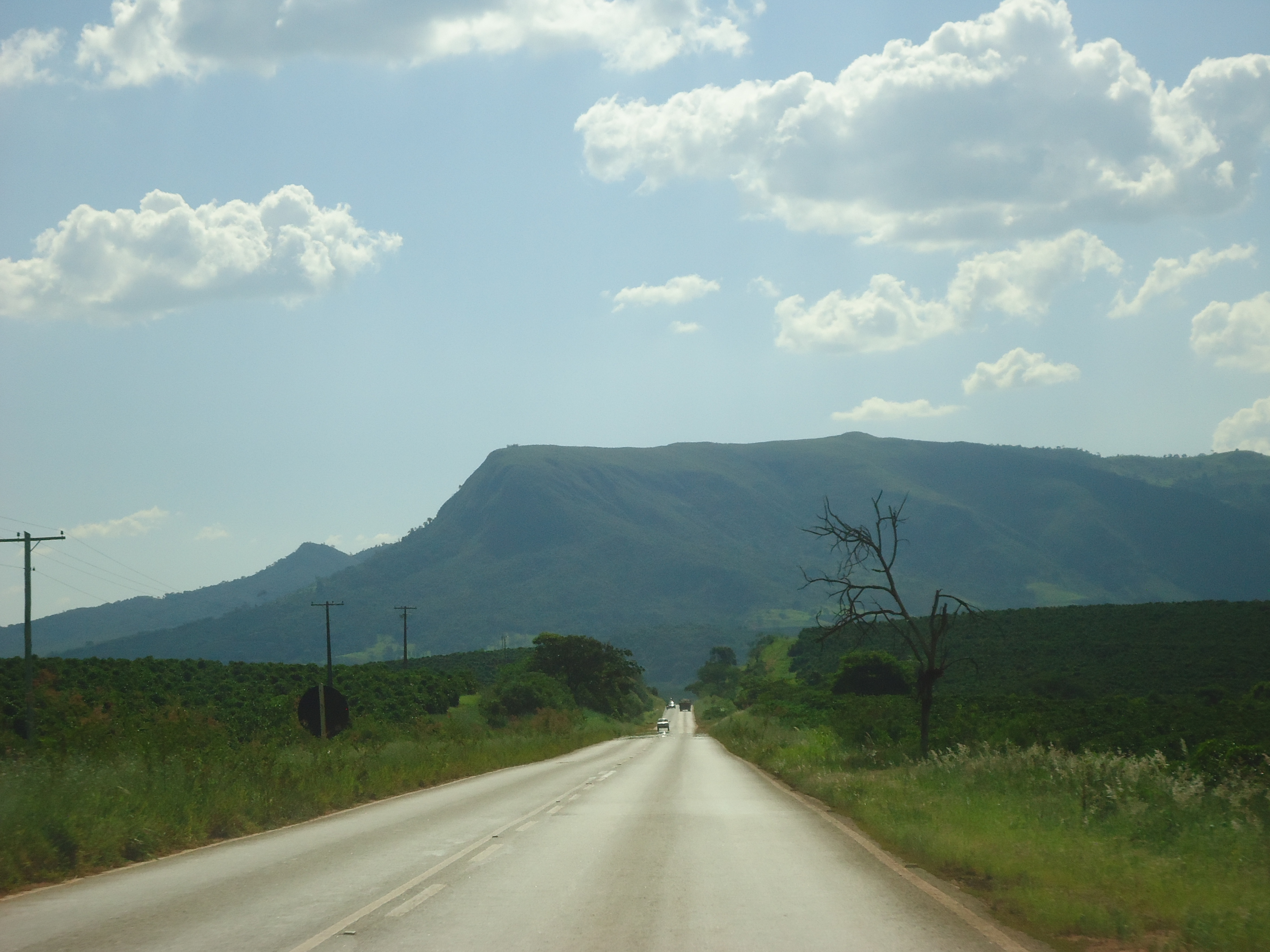
BR-369 in Boa Esperança, Minas Gerais
