= Franz Joseph Untersee =

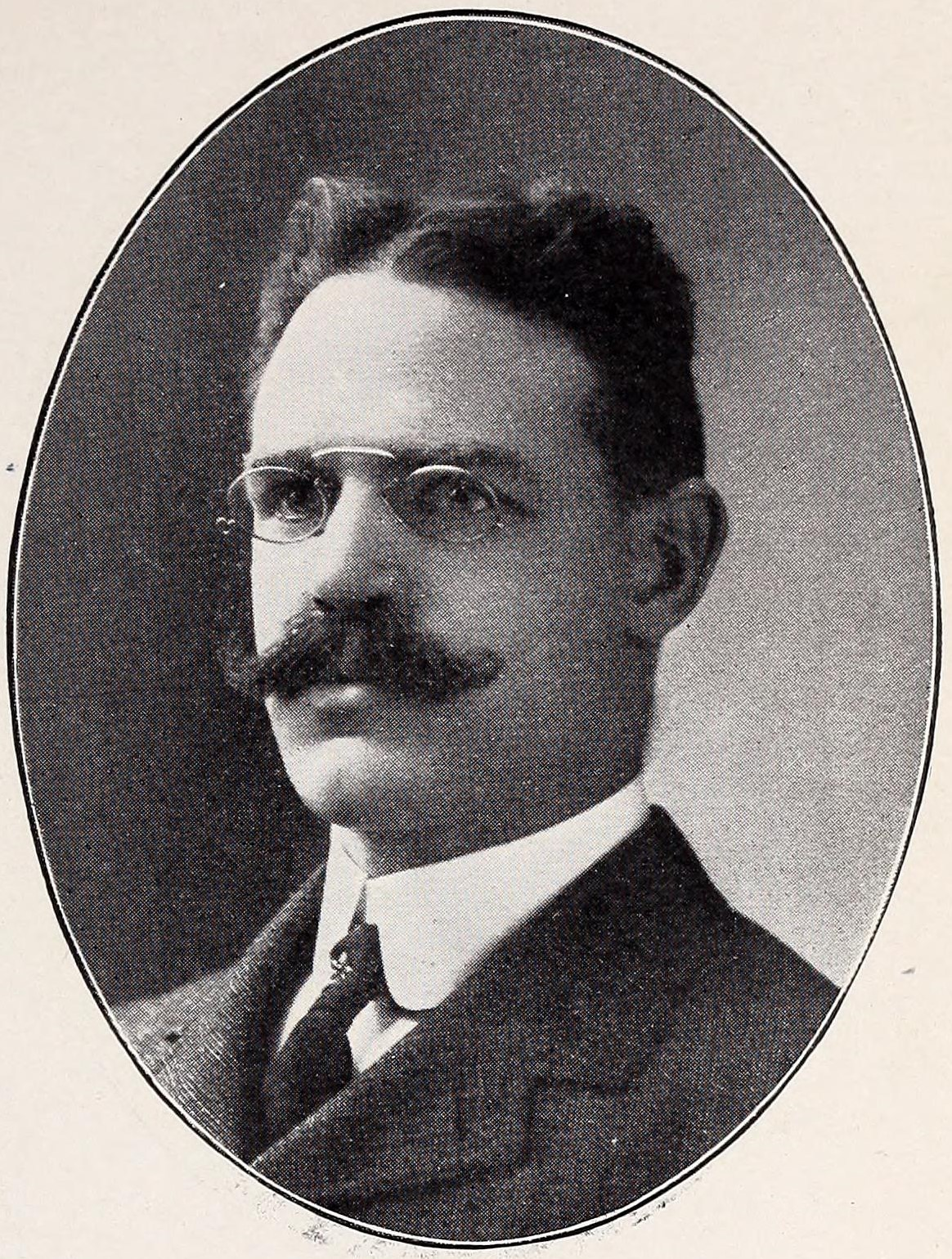
- Born: November 25, 1858; Glarus, Switzerland
- Died: September 5, 1927 (aged 68); Brookline, Massachusetts, U.S.
- Education: University of Stuttgart
- Occupation: Architect

Franz Joseph Untersee (November 25, 1858 – September 5, 1927) was a Swiss-American architect who designed many Roman Catholic churches throughout the eastern part of United States.

Born and educated in Glarus, Switzerland, he was sent to Germany for technical training, and after receiving his degree in architecture from Stuttgart University, returned to his native country. He served for a time as assistant to the City Architect of Bern but left to broaden the scope of his education in other cities of the continent.

In 1882, Untersee sailed for America and having established residence in Brookline, a suburb of Boston, opened an office where he continued active for forty years. He was elected to the Boston Society of Architects in 1896 and in 1901 became an Associate of the American Institute of Architects. Many of his early works were in Brookline including the old Public Bath House (1896), the Manual Training Center (1901) and Brookline Savings Bank (both old and new buildings).

It was however in the field of church design that he was best known. Many Roman Catholic buildings of the then popular Romanesque type were built from his plans in New England and New York State. His last work completed just before his death was the Mission High School, Roxbury, Massachusetts.

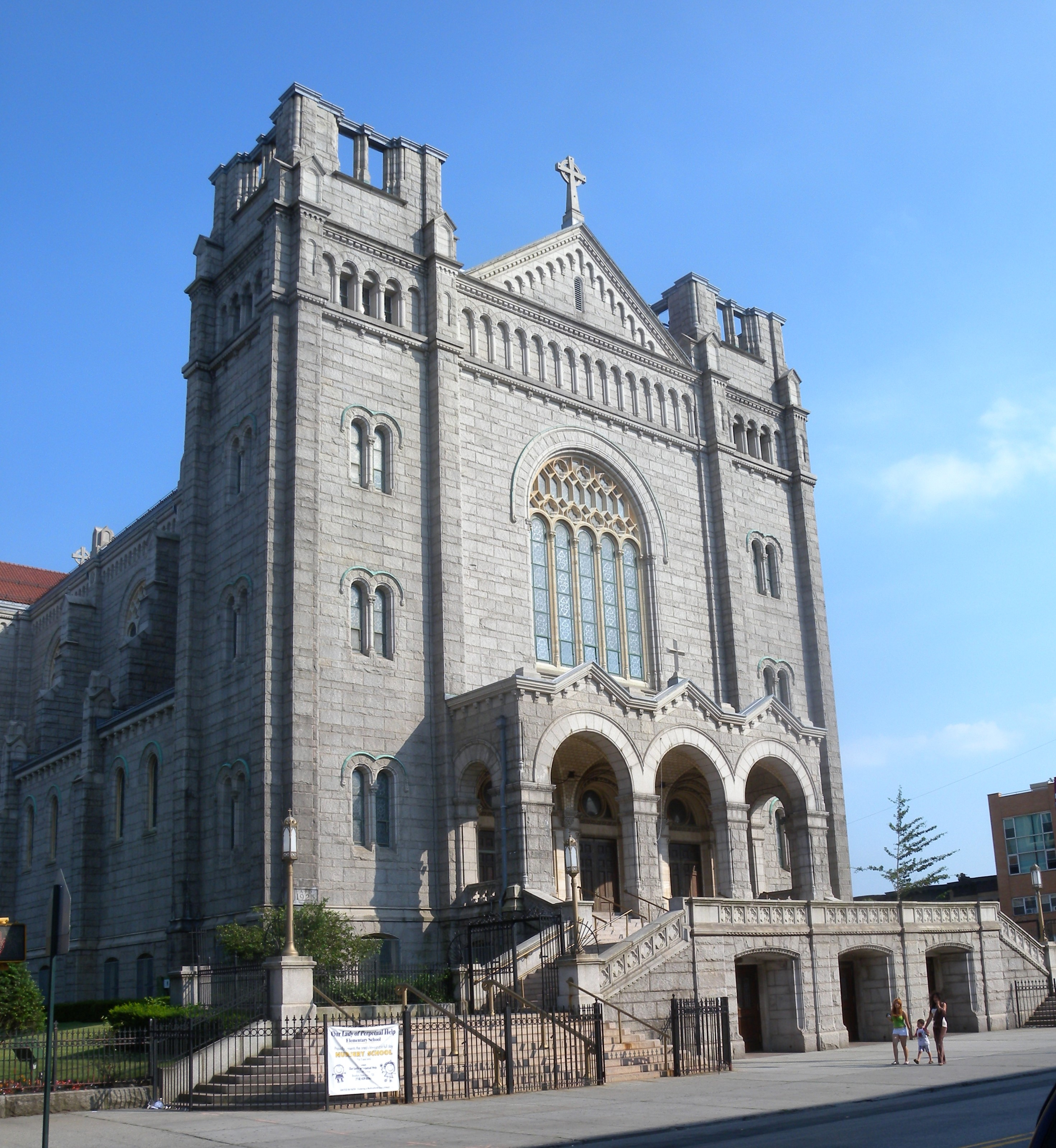
Basilica of Our Lady of Perpetual Help from 5th Avenue

== Works ==
- Basilica and Rectory of Our Lady of Perpetual Help, Brooklyn, New York
- St. Patrick's Church, East Jaffrey, New Hampshire
- St. Patrick's Church, Hampton Beach, New Hampshire
- St Peter & Paul Church and Rectory, Jamestown, New York
- Buildings for the Mt. Saint Alphonsus Retreat Center for the Redemptorist Fathers, Esopus-on-the-Hudson, New York
- The towers for the Mission Church, Boston together with a renovation of the interior.
- St. Alphonsus Hall Boston, Massachusetts
- The tower for St. Columbkille Church, Brighton, Massachusetts
- St. Columbkille School, Brighton, Massachusetts
- St. Anthony Church, Allston, Massachusetts
- St. Mary Star of the Sea Church, East Boston, Massachusetts
- St. Lawrence Church, Brookline, Massachusetts
- House of the Good Shepherd, Roxbury, Massachusetts (5 buildings, demolished in the 1960s)

== Buildings attributed to Untersee ==
- St John\St Hugh Church, Roxbury, MA
