= Alberto Valentim =

Brazilian footballer and manager (born 1975)

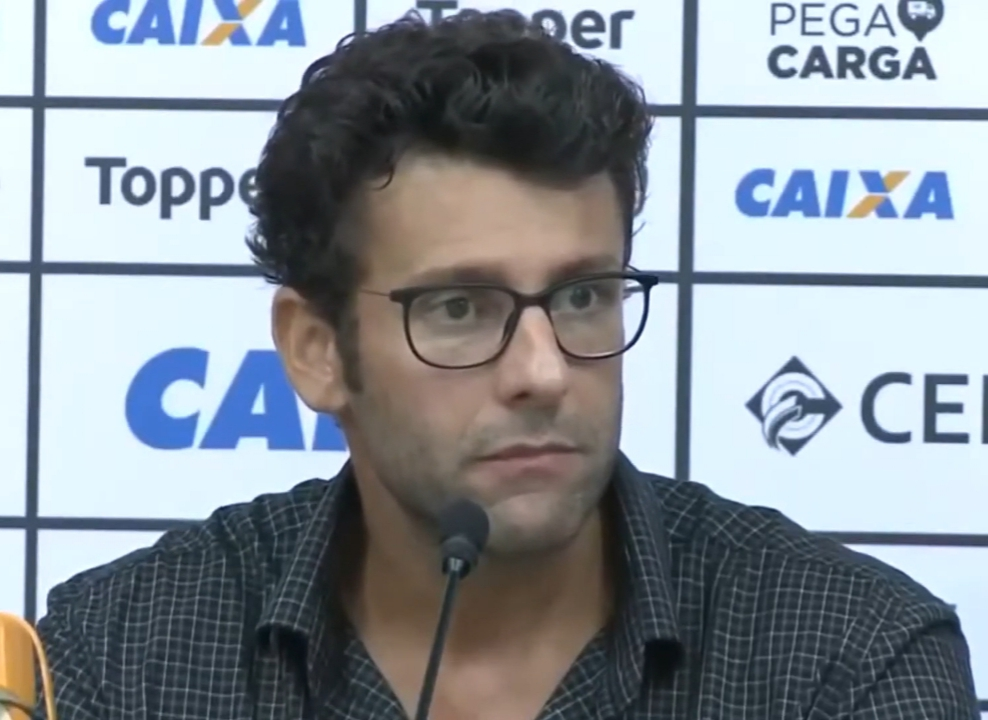
- Valentim in 2018

Personal information
- Full name: Alberto Valentim do Carmo Neto
- Date of birth: 22 March 1975 (age 51)
- Place of birth: Oliveira, Brazil
- Height: 1.81 m (5 ft 11 in)
- Position: Right back

Team information
- Current team: Operário Ferroviário (head coach)

Youth career
- América Mineiro

Senior career*
| Years | Team | Apps | (Gls) |
| 1995 | Guarani | 4 | (0) |
| 1995–1996 | Inter de Limeira | | |
| 1996–1999 | Atlético Paranaense | 73 | (1) |
| 1997 | → São Paulo (loan) | 0 | (0) |
| 1997 | → Cruzeiro (loan) | 0 | (0) |
| 1998 | → Flamengo (loan) | 0 | (0) |
| 2000–2005 | Udinese | 86 | (3) |
| 2005 | → Siena (loan) | 15 | (0) |
| 2005–2008 | Siena | 62 | (0) |
| 2008–2009 | Athletico Paranaense | 8 | (0) |
| Total | | 248 | (4) |

International career
| 1995 | Brazil U20 | 5 | (0) |
| 1995 | Brazil U23 | 5 | (0) |

Managerial career
- 2012–2013: Athletico Paranaense (assistant)
- 2013: Athletico Paranaense (interim)
- 2014–2016: Palmeiras (assistant)
- 2014: Palmeiras (interim)
- 2014: Palmeiras (interim)
- 2015: Palmeiras (interim)
- 2016: Palmeiras (interim)
- 2017: Red Bull Brasil
- 2017: Palmeiras (assistant)
- 2017: Palmeiras (interim)
- 2018: Botafogo
- 2018: Pyramids
- 2018–2019: Vasco da Gama
- 2019: Avaí
- 2019–2020: Botafogo
- 2021: Cuiabá
- 2021–2022: Athletico Paranaense
- 2022: CSA
- 2023: Atlético Goianiense
- 2024: Ituano
- 2025: Ponte Preta
- 2025–2026: América Mineiro
- 2026–: Operário Ferroviário
- * Club domestic league appearances and goals

Alberto Valentim do Carmo Neto (born 22 March 1975) is a Italo-Brazilian football coach and former player who played as a right back. He is the current head coach of Operário Ferroviário.

== Playing career ==
=== Brazil ===
Born in Oliveira, Minas Gerais, Alberto started his professional career at Guarani of São Paulo state. After a spell at Inter de Limeira, then spent 4 seasons at Athletico Paranaense, which also loaned to São Paulo and Flamengo for Copa do Brasil, Campeonato Paulista and Campeonato Carioca, and Cruzeiro for the 1997 Intercontinental Cup.

=== Udinese ===
In January 2000, he was signed by Italian Serie A club Udinese via Rentistas for US$6.65 million. He played his first Serie A match on 23 January, replaced Roberto Sosa in the 79th minutes. The match Udinese won Venezia 5–2. He played 14 league matches in the first season. But in September 2000, along with Warley, were found using a fake Portuguese passport by Polish officials while heading to Poland for the match against Polonia Warsaw. It followed by an investigation of Italian police, and found 2 more teammate namely Jorginho Paulista and Alejandro Da Silva were using fake passport. It is because Serie A restricted each club could only had 5 non-European Union footballers and 3 in each match, a fake passport could increase their chance to win a contract with Italian club. However, that season Alberto played 27 league matches and scored 2 goals, as the quota system was abolished in the mid of season. In June 2001, Alberto, along with a dozen other including 3 of Alberto's teammate, were banned, 10 of them including Alberto for a year and 3 youth players for 6 months. but allowed to remain at Italy. The ban was later reduced. On 14 April 2002, he played his first league match after the ban, but replaced by Siyabonga Nomvethe at half-time. The match Udinese lost 0–1 to Verona.

The then played 2 more seasons, for Udinese.

=== Siena ===
In January 2005, after just played 2 league matches for the Udine club, he joined another Serie A side Siena. In July 2005, Siena signed him from Udinese in co-ownership deal. He played 31 league matches that season for the Serie A struggler and the Tuscany side choose to sign him permanently in 2006. But in 2006–07 season, he just played 10 starts in 16 Serie A appearances and in 2007–08 season with only 2 starts.

=== Return to Brazil ===
In September 2008, he signed a 1 1/2-year contract with Club Athletico Paranaense but only played 8 matches in national leagues.

== Managerial career ==
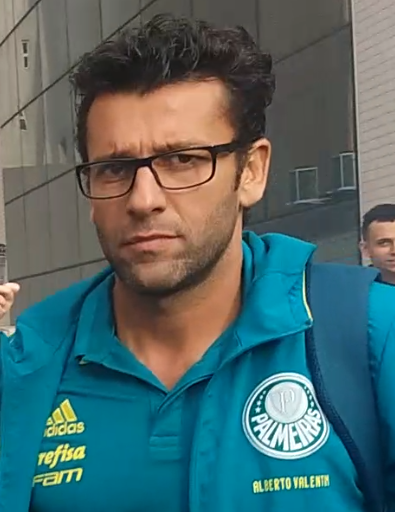
Valentim with Palmeiras in 2016

In 2012, Valentim returned to Atlético Paranaense as an assistant manager. He left the club in the following year, and joined Palmeiras in 2014, also as an assistant.

On 13 December 2016, Valentim was announced as Red Bull Brasil manager. The following 18 April, after a poor campaign in the 2017 Campeonato Paulista, he was sacked.

On 24 June 2017, Valentim returned to Palmeiras, again as an assistant. On 13 October, he was appointed interim manager in the place of sacked Cuca. Despite finishing second, he was released by the club on 5 December.

On 13 February 2018, Valentim was named manager of Botafogo. On 19 June, he resigned after accepting an offer from an Egyptian Club, Pyramids FC.

On 18 August 2018, Valentim left Pyramids FC following a dispute with the club's owner Turki Al-Sheikh regarding the future of the team's striker Ribamar. Just one week later, he has joined Vasco da Gama for the remainder of the Campeonato Brasileiro campaign.

Valentim was sacked on 21 April 2019, after losing the year's Campeonato Carioca. On 18 June, he took over fellow top-tier side Avaí, replacing fired Geninho, but returned to Botafogo on 11 October. He was dismissed by Bota for the second time on 9 February 2020, after a poor campaign in the Carioca.

On 1 April 2021, Valentim was named manager of top tier newcomers Cuiabá. He won the year's Campeonato Mato-Grossense, but was dismissed on 29 May after seven wins in ten matches.

On 1 October 2021, Valentim was named manager of Athletico Paranaense, still in the top tier. He left on a mutual agreement the following 10 April, after a 0–4 loss to São Paulo in the 2022 Série A opener.

On 15 June 2022, Valentim replaced Mozart at the helm of CSA. On 8 August, however, he was dismissed.

On 5 May 2023, after nearly one year without coaching, Valentim was named in charge of Atlético Goianiense in division two, but was dismissed on 10 July. On 26 February 2024, he was appointed head coach of fellow second division side Ituano.

Valentim suffered relegation with Ituano in the 2024 Campeonato Paulista, and was relieved from his duties on 20 October of that year, with the side also in the relegation zone of the 2024 Série B. On 26 November, he was announced as head coach of Ponte Preta.

Valentim opted to leave Ponte on 11 August 2025, amidst a financial crisis, after accepting an offer from América Mineiro. He avoided relegation with the latter, but was sacked on 12 April 2026.

On 8 October 2026, Valentim took over Operário Ferroviário also in the second division.

== Managerial statistics ==
As of 13 April 2026

Managerial record by team and tenure
| Team | Nat | From | To | Record | | | | | | | | Ref |
| Team | Nat | From | To | G | W | D | L | GF | GA | GD | Win % | Ref |
|---|---|---|---|---|---|---|---|---|---|---|---|---|
| Atlético Paranaense (interim) | (Brazil) | 12 July 2013 | 14 July 2013 | 1 | 0 | 0 | 1 | 0 | 1 | −1 | 0.00 | |
| Palmeiras (interim) | (Brazil) | 8 May 2014 | 1 June 2014 | 7 | 4 | 1 | 2 | 7 | 4 | +3 | 57.14 | |
| Palmeiras (interim) | (Brazil) | 2 September 2014 | 4 September 2014 | 1 | 0 | 0 | 1 | 0 | 2 | −2 | 0.00 | |
| Palmeiras (interim) | (Brazil) | 9 June 2015 | 14 June 2015 | 1 | 1 | 0 | 0 | 2 | 1 | +1 | 100.00 | |
| Palmeiras (interim) | (Brazil) | 10 March 2016 | 14 March 2016 | 1 | 1 | 0 | 0 | 2 | 0 | +2 | 100.00 | |
| Red Bull Brasil | (Brazil) | 13 December 2016 | 18 April 2017 | 15 | 4 | 4 | 7 | 19 | 22 | −3 | 26.67 | |
| Palmeiras (interim) | (Brazil) | 13 October 2017 | 5 December 2017 | 11 | 6 | 1 | 4 | 23 | 16 | +7 | 54.55 | |
| Botafogo | (Brazil) | 13 February 2018 | 19 June 2018 | 26 | 11 | 8 | 7 | 34 | 31 | +3 | 42.31 | |
| Pyramids | (Egypt) | 20 June 2018 | 16 August 2018 | 3 | 2 | 1 | 0 | 4 | 2 | +2 | 66.67 | |
| Vasco da Gama | (Brazil) | 24 August 2018 | 21 April 2019 | 41 | 17 | 11 | 13 | 46 | 40 | +6 | 41.46 | |
| Avaí | (Brazil) | 18 June 2019 | 13 October 2019 | 15 | 3 | 4 | 8 | 9 | 26 | −17 | 20.00 | |
| Botafogo | (Brazil) | 14 October 2019 | 9 February 2020 | 18 | 7 | 2 | 9 | 16 | 24 | −8 | 38.89 | |
| Cuiabá | (Brazil) | 1 April 2021 | 29 May 2021 | 10 | 7 | 3 | 0 | 18 | 5 | +13 | 70.00 | |
| Athletico Paranaense | (Brazil) | 1 October 2021 | 10 April 2022 | 28 | 8 | 8 | 12 | 25 | 34 | −9 | 28.57 | |
| CSA | (Brazil) | 15 June 2022 | 8 August 2022 | 10 | 1 | 4 | 5 | 6 | 12 | −6 | 10.00 | |
| Atlético Goianiense | (Brazil) | 5 May 2023 | 10 July 2023 | 12 | 3 | 6 | 3 | 12 | 18 | −6 | 25.00 | |
| Ituano | (Brazil) | 26 February 2024 | 20 October 2024 | 34 | 9 | 4 | 21 | 37 | 57 | −20 | 26.47 | |
| Ponte Preta | (Brazil) | 26 November 2024 | 11 August 2025 | 27 | 13 | 6 | 8 | 27 | 24 | +3 | 48.15 | |
| América Mineiro | (Brazil) | 12 August 2025 | 12 April 2026 | 35 | 10 | 16 | 9 | 37 | 35 | +2 | 28.57 | |
| Career total | | | | 294 | 107 | 79 | 108 | 324 | 354 | −30 | 36.39 | — |

== Honours ==
=== Player ===
Guarani

- Copa São Paulo de Futebol Júnior: 1994

Inter de Limeira

- Campeonato Paulista Série A2: 1996

São Paulo

- Campeonato Paulista: 1998

Udinese

- UEFA Intertoto Cup: 2000

Athletico Paranaense

- Campeonato Paranaense: 2009

Brazil U20

- Toulon Tournament: 1995

Individual

- Bola de Prata: 1996

=== Manager ===
Botafogo

- Campeonato Carioca: 2018

Vasco da Gama

- Taça Guanabara: 2019

Cuiabá

- Campeonato Mato-Grossense: 2021

Athletico Paranaense

- Copa Sudamericana: 2021
