= Carmópolis de Minas =

Municipality in Minas Gerais, Brazil

Coordinates: 20°33′S 44°38′W

- Municipality
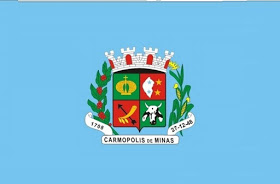
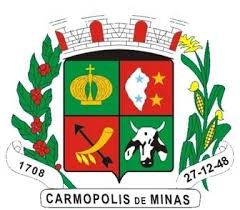
- Flag Coat of arms
- Interactive map of Carmópolis de Minas
- Country: Brazil
- State: Minas Gerais
- Region: Southeast

Population (2022 Census)
  - Total: 18,003
  - Estimate (2025): 18,561
- Time zone: UTC−3 (BRT)

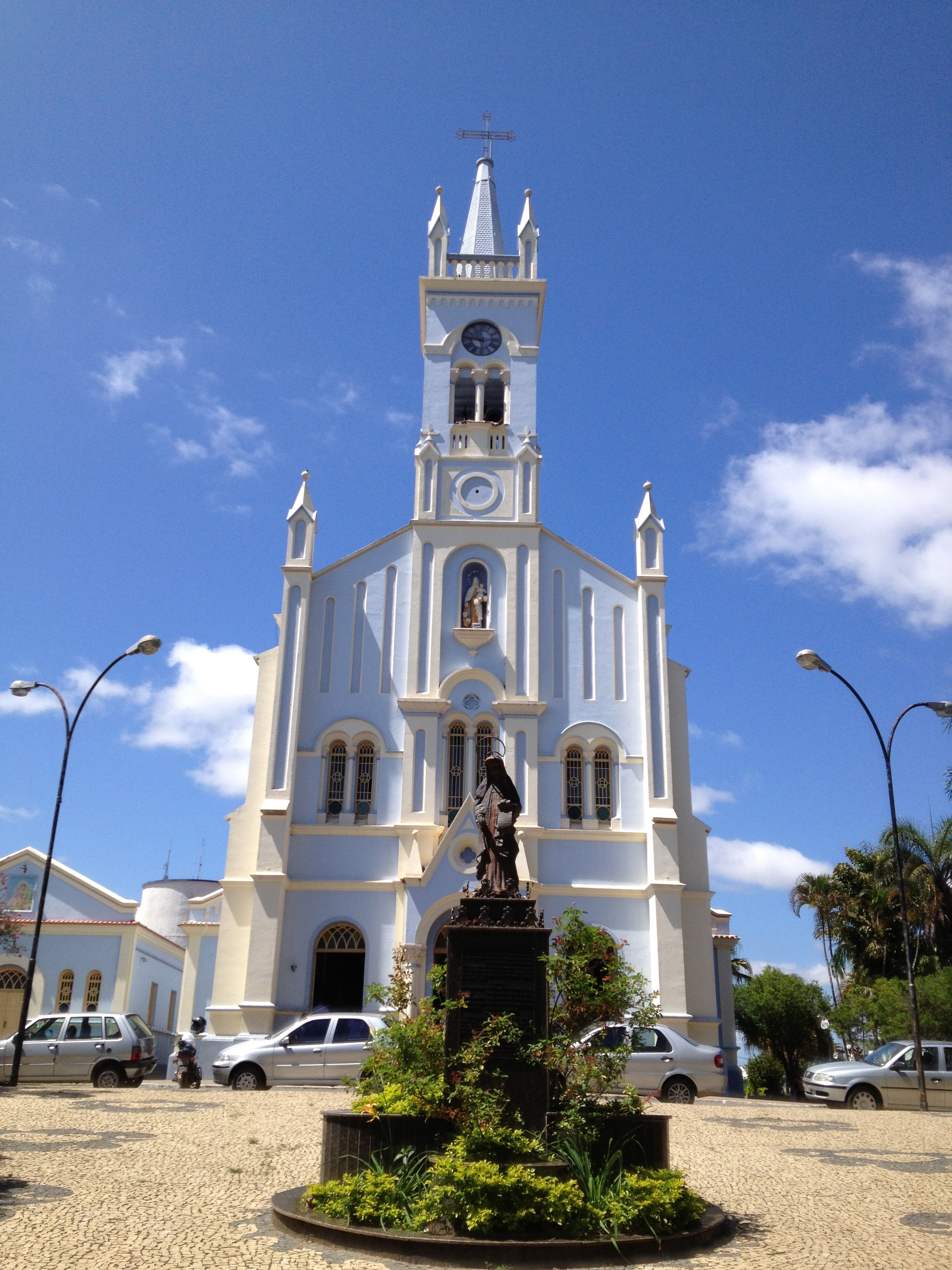
Our Lady of Mount Carmel church in Carmópolis de Minas

Carmópolis de Minas is a municipality in the Brazilian state of Minas Gerais. As of 2020, the estimated population was 19,559.

== History ==
The municipality is named "Carmópolis" (City of Carmel) after its patron Our Lady of Carmel.

The indigenous inhabitants of the region were the Carijós, Goianazes and Cataguás. Around 1700, the region was first visited by white, bandeirantes paulistas and Portuguese. They moved through the area, leaving some white settlers in charge of farming, to ensure food supply on their return. In 1807, construction began of the Church, by Father Dominic da Costa Guimarães. The town slowly developed, and in 1862 became the village of Oliveira, which it remained until 1948, when it was named Carmópolis de Minas.

== See also ==
- List of municipalities in Minas Gerais
