= Jaffrey Mills =

- U.S. National Register of Historic Places
- U.S. Historic district – Contributing property
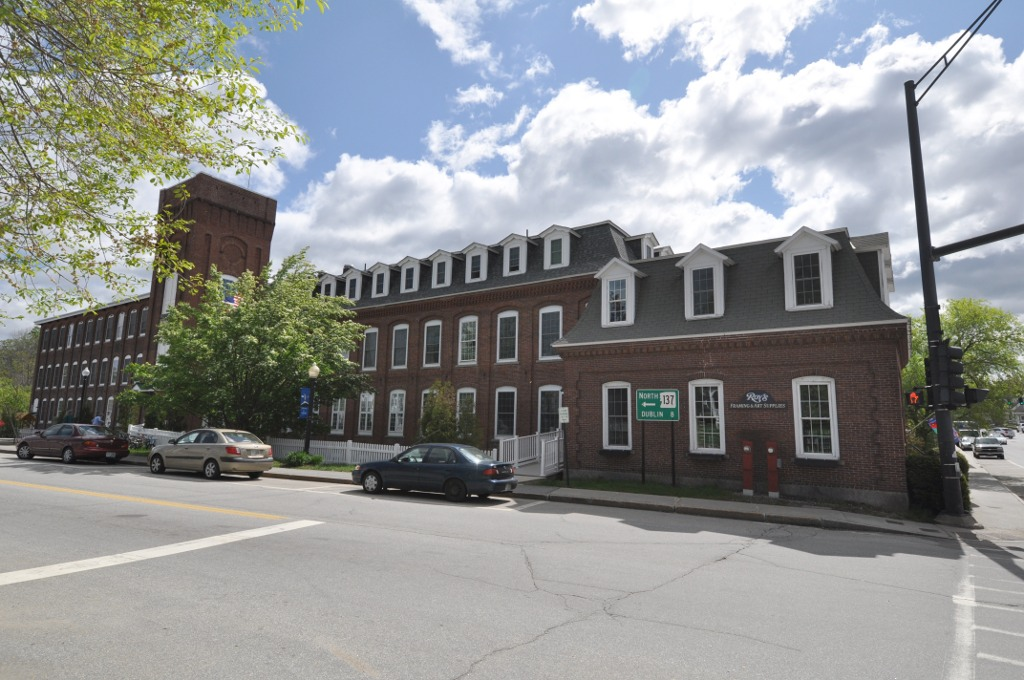

- Location within New Hampshire Location within the United States
- Location: 41 Main St., Jaffrey, New Hampshire
- Coordinates: 42°48′54″N 72°1′25″W
- Area: 1.4 acres (0.57 ha)
- Built: 1868
- Part of: East Jaffrey Historic District (ID02000642)
- NRHP reference No.: 82004992

Significant dates
- Added to NRHP: August 10, 1982
- Designated CP: June 14, 2002

The Jaffrey Mills is a historic mill complex at 41 Main Street, in the central business district of Jaffrey, New Hampshire. It consists of a connected series of primarily brick buildings flanking the Contoocook River just north of Main Street. Its oldest buildings, the original mill and office building, are on the west side of the river. They were built in 1868, and feature mansard roofs and banded dentil brick cornices. The mill building has a tower that originally sported a cupola, but this was removed early in the 20th century. In 1872 the building on the east side was built, and the two sides joined by timber-frame bridges were added in 1897, at the same time the east building was extended northward. Later additions to the north of the east building include a storage area and a loading dock. The mill complex, the only 19th-century industrial complex of its type to be built in Jaffrey, was listed on the National Register of Historic Places in 1982. It has been converted into residences.

The oldest buildings in the complex were built by Alonzo Bascom, the local postmaster. He sold them, unused due to his ill health, in 1871 to Stone Brothers and Curtis. They built the east side mills, and began the manufacture of woven cotton fabric, also using the water power to support a grist mill and various woodworking operations. Their business was short-lived due to the post-Civil War economic downturn, and they closed in 1876. The White Brothers of Winchendon, Massachusetts next took over the property, again using for textile manufacture until 1939, when it closed due to the Great Depression. Before it was converted to housing, it saw a number of varied light industrial uses in the mid-20th century.

== See also ==
- National Register of Historic Places listings in Cheshire County, New Hampshire
