= Aloísio Hilário de Pinho =

Brazilian Roman Catholic bishop (1934–2021)

Aloísio Hilário de Pinho F.D.P.
- Bishop of Jataí
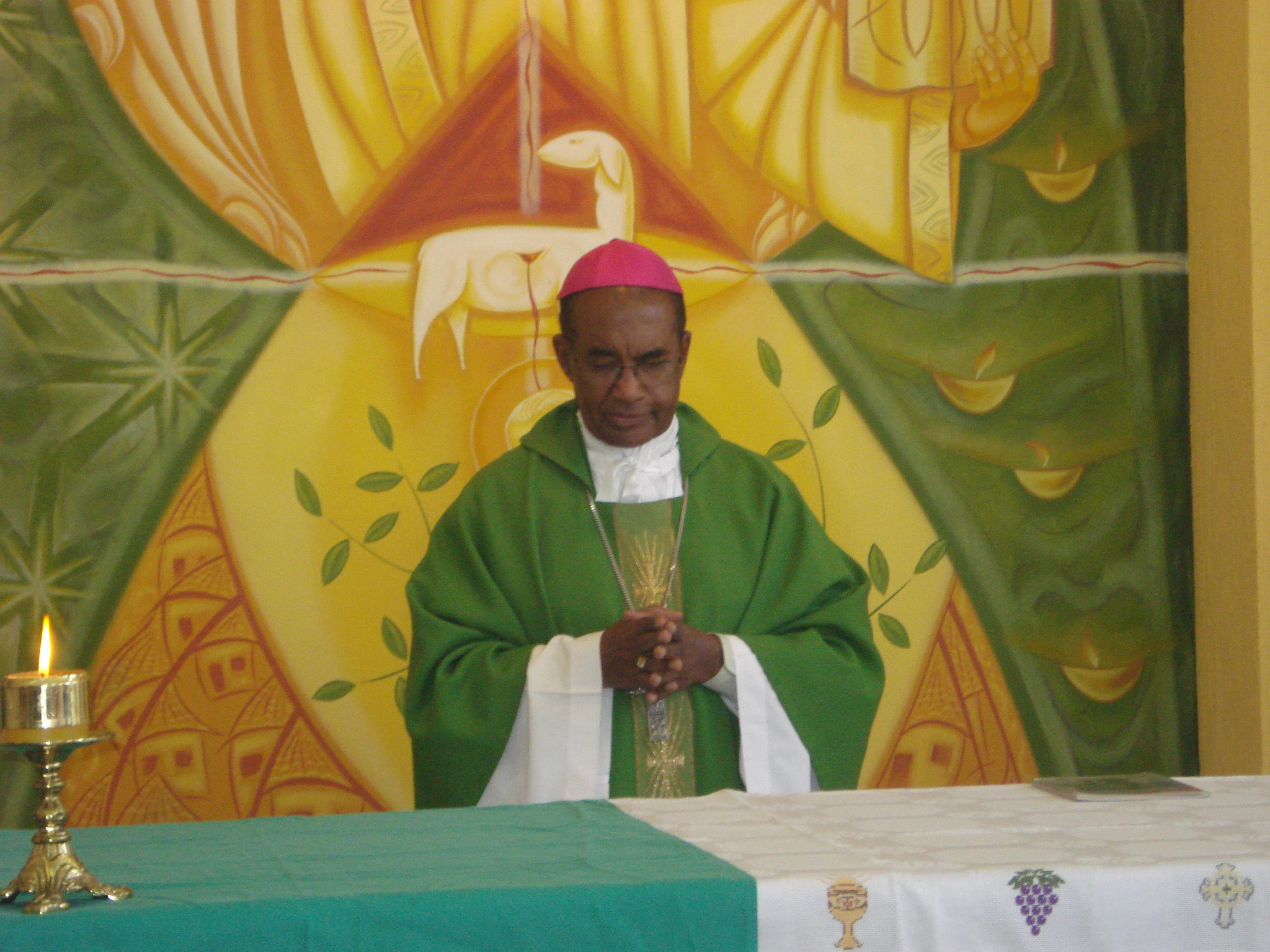
- de Pinho in 2008
- Church: Catholic Church
- Diocese: Diocese of Jataí
- In office: 22 December 1999 – 16 December 2009
- Predecessor: Miguel Pedro Mundo
- Successor: José Luiz Majella Delgado
- Previous post: Bishop of Tocantinópolis (1981-1999)

Orders
- Ordination: 19 March 1963
- Consecration: 20 December 1981 by Paulo Evaristo Arns

Personal details
- Born: 14 January 1934 Mariana, Minas Gerais, Republic of the United States of Brazil
- Died: 4 May 2021 (aged 87) Rio Claro, São Paulo, Brazil

Aloísio Hilário de Pinho (14 January 1934 – 4 May 2021) was a Brazilian Roman Catholic bishop.

De Pinho was born in Brazil and was ordained to the priesthood in 1963. He served as bishop of the Roman Catholic Diocese of Tocantinópolis, Brazil, from 1982 to 2000 and as bishop of the Roman Catholic Diocese of Jataí, Brazil, from 2000 to 2009.
