= Antônio Carlos Mesquita =

Brazilian bishop

- Bishop of São João del Rei
- Church: Catholic Church
- Diocese: Diocese of São João del Rei
- In office: 16 December 1983 – 26 June 1996
- Predecessor: Delfim Ribeiro Guedes
- Successor: Waldemar Chaves de Araújo
- Previous posts: Bishop of Oliveira (1977-1983); Titular Bishop of Tamada (1974-1977); Coadjutor Bishop of Oliveira (1974-1977)

Orders
- Ordination: 8 December 1947
- Consecration: 29 June 1974 by João Resende Costa

Personal details
- Born: 13 October 1923 Itapecerica, Minas Gerais, United States of Brazil
- Died: 19 December 2005 (aged 82) Itapecerica, Minas Gerais, Brazil

Antônio Carlos Mesquita (Itapecerica, Minas Gerais, 13 October 1923 - 19 December 2005) was a Brazilian bishop.

He was the second bishop of both the Roman Catholic Diocese of Oliveira and the Roman Catholic Diocese of São João del-Rei.
