= Diocese of Oliveira =

Catholic ecclesiastical territory

Diocese of Oliveira Dioecesis Oliveirensis Diocese de Oliveira
- Coat of arms

Location
- Country: Brazil
- Ecclesiastical province: Belo Horizonte
- Metropolitan: Belo Horizonte

Statistics
- Area: 7,738 km^{2} (2,988 sq mi)
- Population: Total; Catholics: (as of 2004); 300,000; 285,000 (95.0%)

Information
- Denomination: Catholic Church
- Rite: Latin Rite
- Established: 20 December 1941 (84 years ago)
- Cathedral: Cathedral of Our Lady of Oliveira in Oliveira, Minas Gerais

Current leadership
- Pope: Leo XIV
- Bishop: Antônio Carlos Paiva
- Metropolitan Archbishop: Walmor Oliveira de Azevedo
- Bishops emeritus: Francisco Barroso Filho, Miguel Ângelo Freitas Ribeiro

Website
- www.dioceseoliveira.org.br

The Roman Catholic Diocese of Oliveira (Latin: Dioecesis Oliveirensis) is a diocese located in the city of Oliveira in the ecclesiastical province of Belo Horizonte in Brazil.

== History ==
- December 20, 1941: Established as Diocese of Oliveira from the Metropolitan Archdiocese of Belo Horizonte

== Bishops ==
- Bishops of Oliveira (Roman rite)
- Archbishop Antônio dos Santos Cabral, Ap. Administrator (1944 – 1945.08.14)
- Bishop José de Medeiros Leite (1945.08.14 – 1977.03.06)
- Bishop Antônio Carlos Mesquita (1977.03.06 – 1983.12.16)
- Bishop Francisco Barroso Filho (1983.12.21 – 2004.10.20)
- Bishop Jésus Rocha (2004.10.20 – 2006.07.13)
- Bishop Miguel Ângelo Freitas Ribeiro (2007.10.31 – 2026.10.07)
- Bishop Antônio Carlos Paiva (since 2026.10.07)

=== Coadjutor bishop ===
- Antônio Carlos Mesquita (1974.04.08 – 1977.03.06)
- Antônio Carlos Paiva (2025.04.08 – 2026.10.07)

== Sources ==
- GCatholic.org
- Catholic Hierarchy
