= Delfim Ribeiro Guedes =

- Bishop of São João del Rei
- Church: Catholic Church
- Diocese: Diocese of São João del Rei
- In office: 23 July 1960 – 7 December 1983
- Predecessor: Position established
- Successor: Antônio Carlos Mesquita
- Previous post: Bishop of Leopoldina (1943-1960)

Orders
- Ordination: 25 October 1931
- Consecration: 3 October 1943 by Otávio Augusto Chagas de Miranda

Personal details
- Born: 2 May 1908 Maria da Fé, Minas Gerais, United States of Brazil
- Died: 23 February 1985 (aged 76)

Delfim Ribeiro Guedes (Maria da Fé, state of Minas Gerais, 2 May 1908 - 23 February 1985) was a Brazilian bishop.

He was the first bishop of both the Diocese of Leopoldina and the Diocese of São João del Rei.
