= Antônio Carlos Paiva =

Brazilian Roman Catholic bishop (born 1968)

The Most Reverend Antônio Carlos Paiva
- Bishop of Oliveira
- Church: Catholic Church
- Diocese: Oliveira
- Appointed: 7 October 2026
- Predecessor: Miguel Ângelo Freitas Ribeiro
- Previous post: Coadjutor Bishop of Oliveira (2025–2026)

Orders
- Ordination: 15 November 1999 by João Bosco Oliver de Faria
- Consecration: 14 June 2025 by Cláudio Nori Sturm

Personal details
- Born: 9 May 1968 (age 58) Alto Rio Doce, Minas Gerais, Brazil
- Education: Pontifical Gregorian University
- Motto: Christus in vobis spes gloriae
- Coat of arms

Antônio Carlos Paiva (born 9 May 1968) is a Brazilian Roman Catholic prelate who has served as bishop of Oliveira since 7 October 2026. He previously served as coadjutor bishop of Oliveira from 2025 to 2026.

== Early life and education ==
Antônio Carlos Paiva was born on 9 May 1968 in Alto Rio Doce, in the Archdiocese of Mariana, Minas Gerais, Brazil. He studied philosophy at the Maria Imaculada Major Seminary in Araxá from 1992 to 1994 and theology at the Dom José André Coimbra Major Seminary in Patos de Minas from 1995 to 1998. He subsequently obtained a master's degree in spiritual theology from the Pontifical Gregorian University in Rome.

== Priesthood ==
Paiva was ordained a priest for the Diocese of Patos de Minas on 15 November 1999 by Bishop João Bosco Oliver de Faria.

From 1999 onward, he served in a number of pastoral and diocesan positions. He was parochial vicar of São Benedito in Patos de Minas from 1999 to 2000 and parish administrator of Bom Jesus in Monte Carmelo from 2000 to 2001. He served as rector of the Dom José André Coimbra Major Seminary from 2001 to 2003 and again from 2016 to 2020, and as vicar general from 2003 to 2004.

Paiva was subsequently parish priest of São Sebastião in São Gotardo from 2006 to 2011 and of São Benedito in Patos de Minas from 2011 to 2016. From 2020 until his episcopal appointment, he was parish priest of Nossa Senhora da Piedade in Lagoa Formosa.

During his priestly ministry, he also served as a member of the diocesan College of Consultors and Presbyteral Council and held several other diocesan responsibilities, including work related to clergy formation and pastoral ministry.

== Episcopate ==
=== Coadjutor bishop of Oliveira ===
On 8 April 2025, Pope Francis appointed Paiva coadjutor bishop of the Diocese of Oliveira, in Minas Gerais. The appointment was made after the then bishop of Oliveira, Miguel Ângelo Freitas Ribeiro, requested a coadjutor to assist in the pastoral governance of the diocese.

Paiva was consecrated a bishop on 14 June 2025 in Patos de Minas. His principal consecrator was Cláudio Nori Sturm, Bishop of Patos de Minas; his principal co-consecrators were Miguel Ângelo Freitas Ribeiro, Bishop of Oliveira, and João Bosco Oliver de Faria, Archbishop Emeritus of Diamantina.

His episcopal motto is Christus in vobis spes gloriae ("Christ in you, the hope of glory"), taken from Colossians 1:27.

=== Bishop of Oliveira ===
On 7 October 2026, Pope Leo XIV accepted the resignation of Miguel Ângelo Freitas Ribeiro from the pastoral governance of the Diocese of Oliveira. Paiva, who had been serving as coadjutor bishop, succeeded him as diocesan bishop. The National Conference of Bishops of Brazil subsequently issued a greeting to Paiva as the new bishop of Oliveira.
