= Miguel Pedro Mundo =

Catholic bishop (1937–1999)

The Most Reverend Miguel P. Mundo
- Bishop of Jataí
- Province: Goiânia
- Diocese: Jataí
- Appointed: February 24, 1999
- Term ended: May 18, 1999
- Predecessor: Benedict D. Coscia, O.F.M.
- Successor: Aloísio Hilário de Pinho, F.D.P.
- Previous post: Auxiliary Bishop of Jataí (1978–1999)

Orders
- Ordination: May 19, 1962 by Celestine Damiano
- Consecration: June 2, 1978 by George Henry Guilfoyle

Personal details
- Born: July 25, 1937 Staten Island, New York, United States
- Died: May 18, 1999 (aged 61) Jataí, Goiás, Brazil

Miguel Pedro Mundo (July 25, 1937 – May 18, 1999) was an American-born bishop of the Catholic Church in Brazil. In the Diocese of Jataí, he served as Auxiliary Bishop from 1978 to 1999, then Bishop of Jataí for the last three months of his life.

== Biography ==
Born in Staten Island, New York, Mundo was ordained a priest on May 19, 1962, for the Diocese of Camden in New Jersey.

On March 6, 1978, Pope Paul VI appointed him as the Titular Bishop of Blanda Julia and Auxiliary Bishop of Jataí. He was consecrated by Bishop George Guilfoyle of Camden on June 2, 1978. The principal co-consecrators were Bishop Benedict D. Coscia, O.F.M., of Jataí and Camden Auxiliary Bishop James Schad.

Pope John Paul II appointed Mundo to succeed Coscia as Bishop of Jataí on February 24, 1999. He died three months later on May 18, 1999, at the age of 61.

Catholic Church titles
Preceded by Benedict D. Coscia, O.F.M.	Bishop of Jataí, Brazil; 1999–1999	Succeeded by Aloísio Hilário de Pinho, F.D.P.
