= São Francisco de Paula, Minas Gerais =

São Francisco de Paula
- Municipality
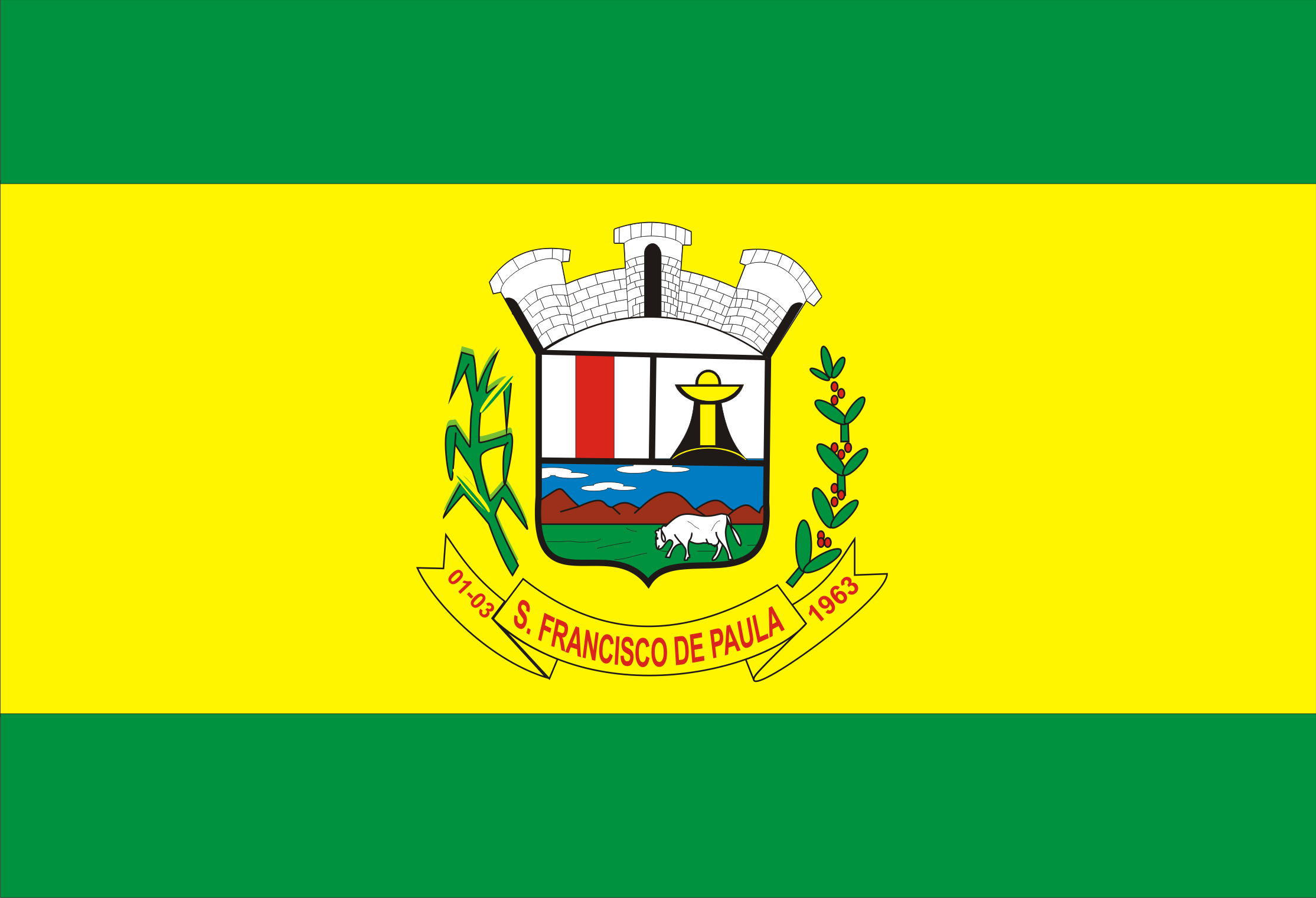
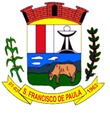
- Flag Coat of arms

- Location in Brazil
- Coordinates: 20°42′36″S 44°59′6″W
- Country: Brazil
- Region: Southeast
- State: Minas Gerais
- Mesoregion: Oeste de Minas

Population (2022 Census)
  - Total: 6,187
  - Estimate (2025): 6,281
- Time zone: UTC−3 (BRT)

São Francisco de Paula is a municipality in the state of Minas Gerais in the Southeast region of Brazil.

== See also ==
- List of municipalities in Minas Gerais
