= East Jaffrey Historic District =

Historic district in New Hampshire, United States

- U.S. National Register of Historic Places
- U.S. Historic district
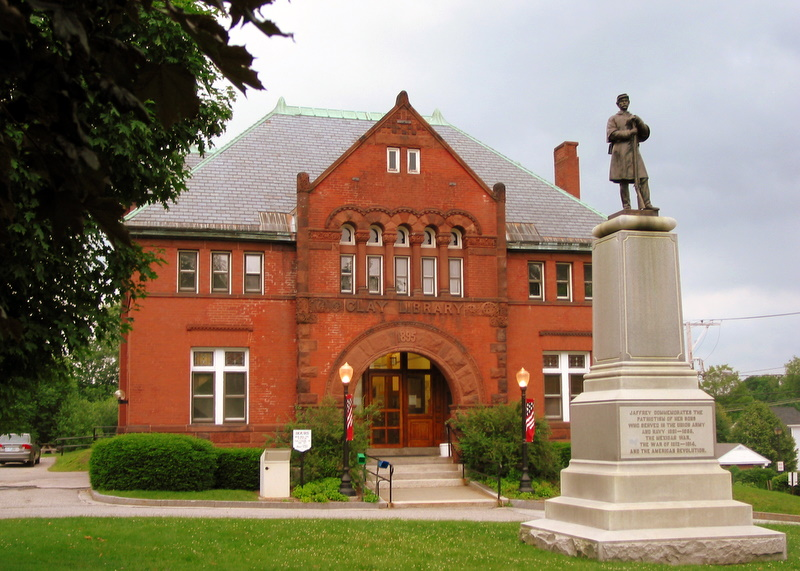
- The Jaffrey Library

- Location within New Hampshire Location within the United States
- Location: Roughly along NH 124 and US 202, Jaffrey, New Hampshire
- Coordinates: 42°48′56″N 72°1′30″W
- Area: 75 acres (30 ha)
- NRHP reference No.: 02000642
- Added to NRHP: June 14, 2002

The East Jaffrey Historic District is a historic district running roughly along NH Route 124 (Main Street) through Jaffrey, New Hampshire. It encompasses what is now the economic and civic heart of the town, centered on the Jaffrey Mills and the crossing of the Contoocook River by Route 124. It extends as far west as St. Patrick's Church beyond Charlonne Street and as far east as the US Post Office building at Route 124 and Ellison Street. To the north it extends along Peterborough Street (United States Route 202) to Christian Court, and to the south it extends along River Street (also US 202) and School Street to their junction. The district includes early 19th-century residential structures, as well as industrial buildings and housing associated with the Jaffrey Mills which arose in the mid-19th century. The district was added to the National Register of Historic Places in 2002.

The town of Jaffrey was laid out in the 1740s, and incorporated in 1773. Its original town center, now the Jaffrey Center Historic District, was located near its geographic center. The village of East Jaffrey had its beginnings with the establishment of saw and grist mills on the Contoocook River in 1770 by John Boorland. The construction of a turnpike (now NH 124) near the mills in 1799 brought further economic activity. In 1814, the mill complex was replaced by a woolen mill, predecessor to the Jaffrey Mills buildings that now line the river north of the Main Street bridge. By the mid-19th century the area had seen significant growth, with a large number of Greek Revival houses, and a growing array of businesses and civic institutions. The arrival of the railroad in 1870 cemented the area's economic and civic importance.

== See also ==
- National Register of Historic Places listings in Cheshire County, New Hampshire
