= Basilica of Our Lady of Perpetual Help =

Catholic basilica in New York City

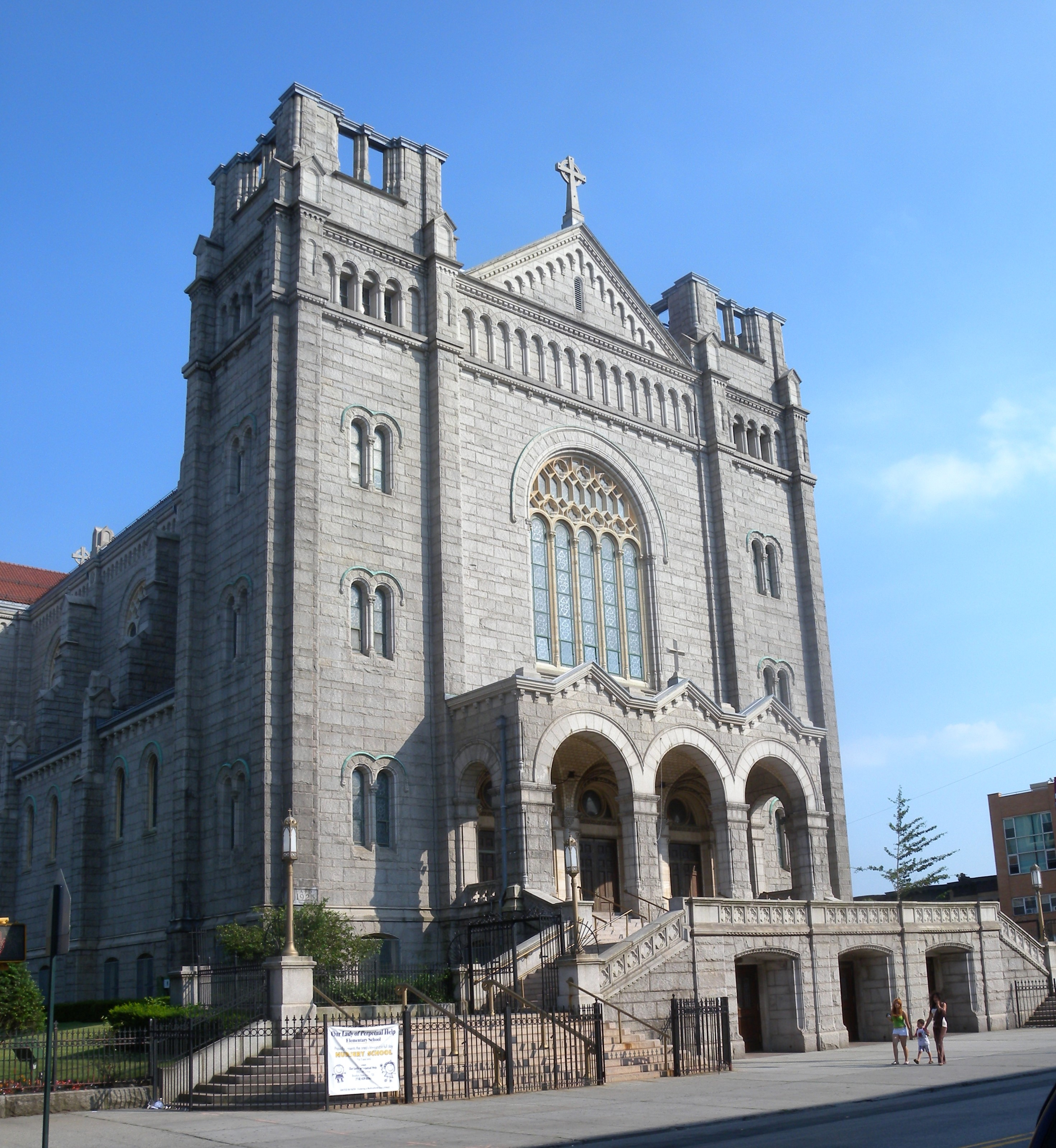
- Basilica of Our Lady of Perpetual Help from 5th Avenue

- Location within New York City
- 40°38′23″N 74°0′56″W
- Location: 526 59th Street; Brooklyn, New York
- Country: United States
- Denomination: Catholic Church
- Sui iuris church: Latin Church
- Website: www.olphbkny.org

History
- Status: Minor Basilica
- Founded: November 1892; 133 years ago
- Founder: Bishop Charles Edward McDonnell
- Dedication: Our Mother of Perpetual Succour

Architecture
- Functional status: Parish church
- Groundbreaking: 1907; 119 years ago
- Completed: 1928; 98 years ago

Administration
- Diocese: Brooklyn
- Parish: Parish of Our Lady of Perpetual Help

Clergy
- Bishop(s): His Excellency, Most Rev. Robert J. Brennan
- Pastor(s): Very Rev. Robert Wojtek, C.SS.R.

The Basilica of Our Lady of Perpetual Help is a Roman Catholic minor basilica and Marian shrine in Brooklyn, New York, United States. The shrine is dedicated to the Blessed Virgin Mary under the title of Our Mother of Perpetual Succour.

Pope Paul VI raised the shrine to the status of Minor Basilica via the Pontifical Decree Quamquam Christianus on 15 September 1969.

== History ==
The parish of Our Lady of Perpetual Help was established by Bishop Charles Edward McDonnell in November 1892 to serve the residents of the Sunset Park neighborhood of Brooklyn. It was formed from the parishes of Our Lady of Angels and St. Michael. The Congregation of the Most Holy Redeemer (Redemptorists) purchased land, bordered by 59th and 60th Streets and by Fifth and Sixth Avenues in what was then a relatively rural area. The first Mass was celebrated on Easter Sunday, April 2, 1893, in the Morse family house on 54th Street and 4th Avenue. A wooden frame church on Fifth Avenue between 59th and 60th Streets was dedicated by Bishop Charles Edward McDonnell on January 14, 1894.

The Redemptorists hold a particular regard for Mary, under the title Our Lady of Perpetual Help. On May 6, 1894, they established the devotion in the parish, distributing prayer cards. The following December a copy of the icon of Our Lady of Perpetual Help, brought from Rome, was installed in the new church. The perpetual novena to Mary under the title of Our Lady of Perpetual Help continues.

Construction on the current church began in 1907. The lower level was opened for services two years later, with the upper church completed in 1928. The church was decreed a minor basilica on 15 September 1969 by the Vatican. The public inauguration ceremony was held on 1 November 1969.

At the time of its completion, the parish was largely Irish in character (as evidenced by the inscriptions on the memorial windows). It was built on what was known as Irish Hill. Some of the family names include Collins, Brennan, Wade, Connors, Burns, McCaffrey, Healy, and Coffey. There is still an Irish presence, but today it is predominantly Hispanic and Chinese. The basilica enjoys large attendance, particularly on holidays such as Ash Wednesday, Palm Sunday and Christmas.

The parish offers immigration services in its Juan Neumann Center, operates a food pantry, hosts a Chinese senior citizen group and leases space to benefit the community to a pre-k program and Lutheran Medical Center.

== Description ==
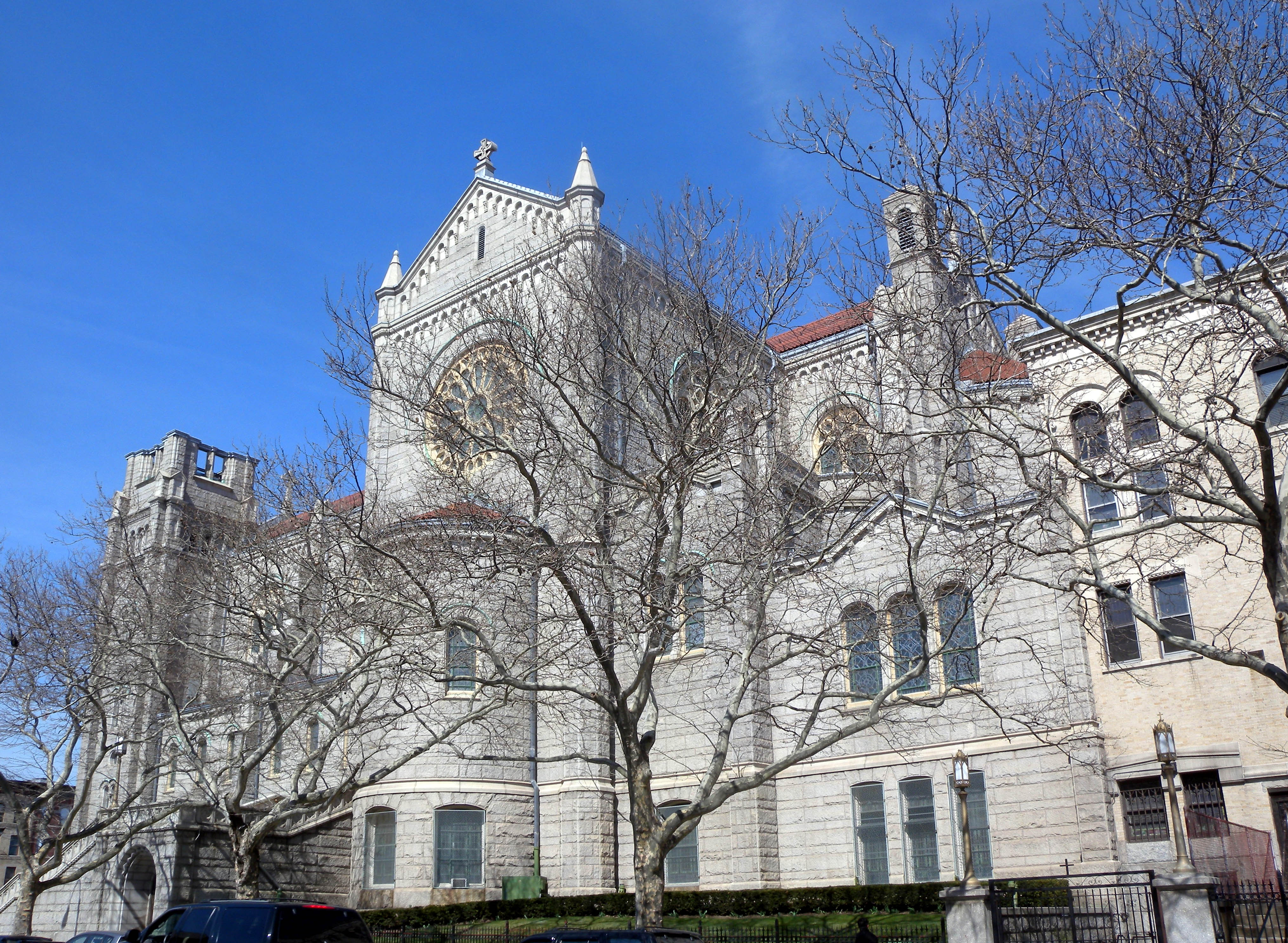
Basilica of Our Lady of Perpetual Help from 60th Street

The basilica, founded and still staffed by the Redemptorists, is a Roman Catholic parish church of the Diocese of Brooklyn. It is dedicated to Our Lady of Perpetual Help, and serves as a pro-cathedral. The architect was Franz Joseph Untersee of Boston. The granite church is Romanesque with a limestone exterior. As a double chapel, the basilica has two floors of worship, like the Basilica of San Francesco d'Assisi. The upstairs church was commonly only used to host weddings and special group services such as confirmation and communion, but has come back into more frequent use. For many years, mass in Spanish was held upstairs because of the large number of parishioners in attendance. Masses are also celebrated in Chinese and Vietnamese. The lower level is for smaller services. The first floor has been renovated many times in recent years.

Because of its size, the basilica hosts major diocesan services (e.g., ordinations) that would otherwise be held at Brooklyn's other, considerably smaller basilica, the Cathedral Basilica of St. James. For the same reason, it also hosts more somber events; it is a venue-of-choice for the larger funerals of those who have fallen in the line of duty while in the service of the New York City Police Department and the New York City Fire Department.

== School ==
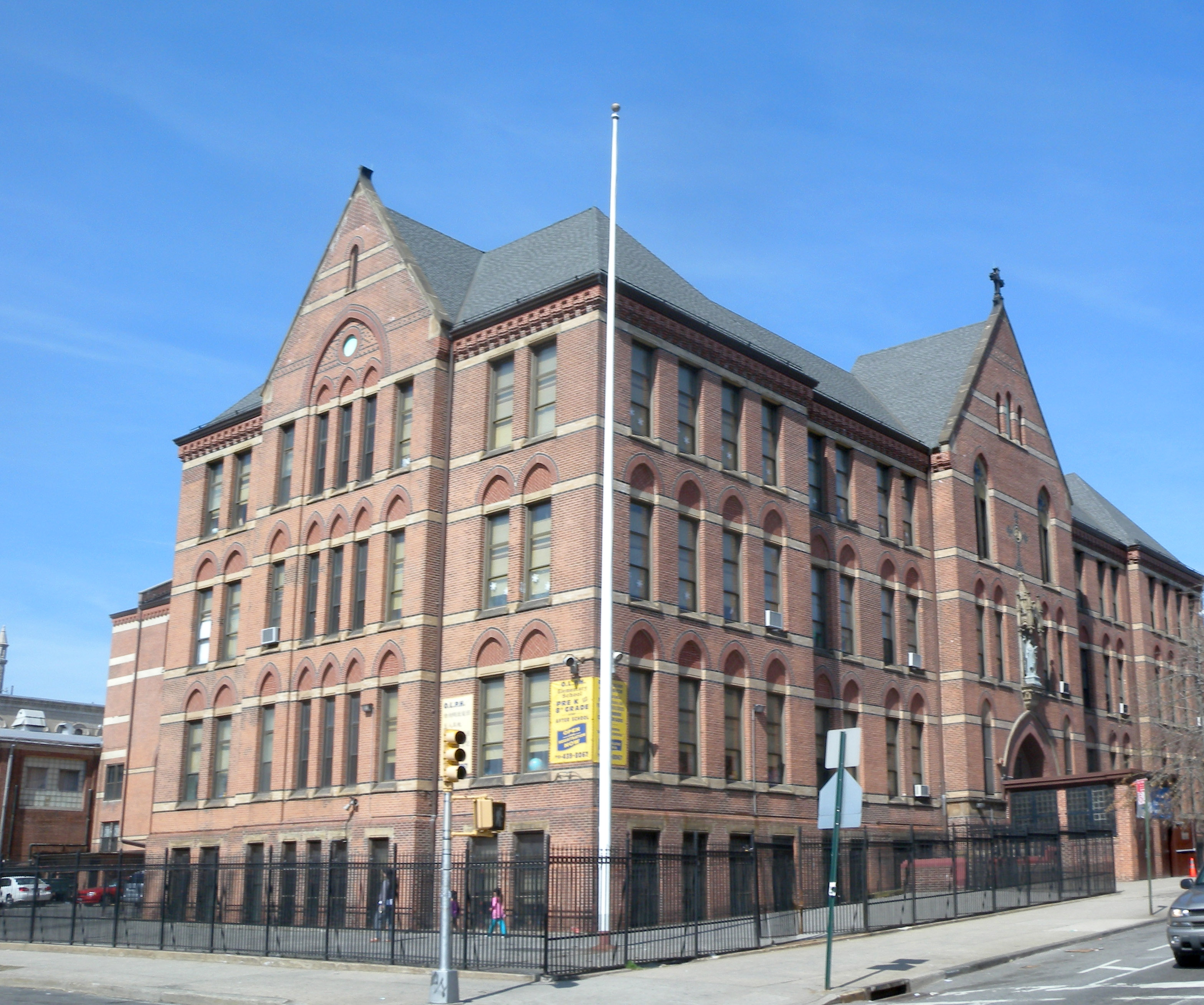
OLPH school

The parish had an elementary / middle school, Our Lady of Perpetual Help School, which was located on 6th Avenue between 59th and 60th Street. The elementary school originally opened on September 9, 1903 as Saint Alphonsus School. The name was changed to Our Lady of Perpetual Help School in 1917 when Brooklyn Bishop Charles E. McDonnell approved the name change. In 2016 the parish school became defunct after 113 years and was immediately succeeded by Our Lady of Perpetual Help Catholic Academy of Brooklyn (OLPHCAB). However, OLPH Cab closed permanently in June 2025 after 9 years of operation. The decision was announced by the Diocese of Brooklyn due to the declining of 36% in student enrollment and financial constraints.

In 2012, the not-for-profit Regina Opera Company moved to the auditorium of OLPH School.

== Notable people ==
Chuck Connors, of The Rifleman, grew up in the neighborhood and served as an altar boy at OLPH.
