= Piracema =

Piracema (from tupi "pirá", fish + "sema", exit) is the name given to the period of the year when fish within the Paraguay River drainage basin―which includes the Pantanal region in the Brazilian states of Mato Grosso and Mato Grosso do Sul―reproduce.

The season lasts from October to March, during which the fish swim upstream to lay their eggs and reproduce. Thus the season is critical for the maintenance of fish populations in the waters of the local rivers and lakes. Both of the Brazilian states prohibit fishing during this period.

== Prohibition of Fishing ==
Measures have been taken as a way of preventing impacts from overfishing during the piracema period.

In the states of Mato Grosso and Mato Grosso do Sul it is a crime to fish in any location that has been designated by any environmental institution.

The use of explosives, toxic substances, fishing gear such as spears, harpoons, drag nets, and diving equipment are all prohibited by law, since they can affect the life cycles of the fish population.

Some species of fish are protected and they can only be caught if they are within a certain size range. For example, the golden dourado (Salminus brasiliensis) can only be caught if it is no longer than 55 cm.
