= Diocese of Jataí =

Catholic ecclesiastical territory

Coordinates: 17.8859°S 51.7238°W

Diocese of Jataí Dioecesis Iataiensis

Catholic
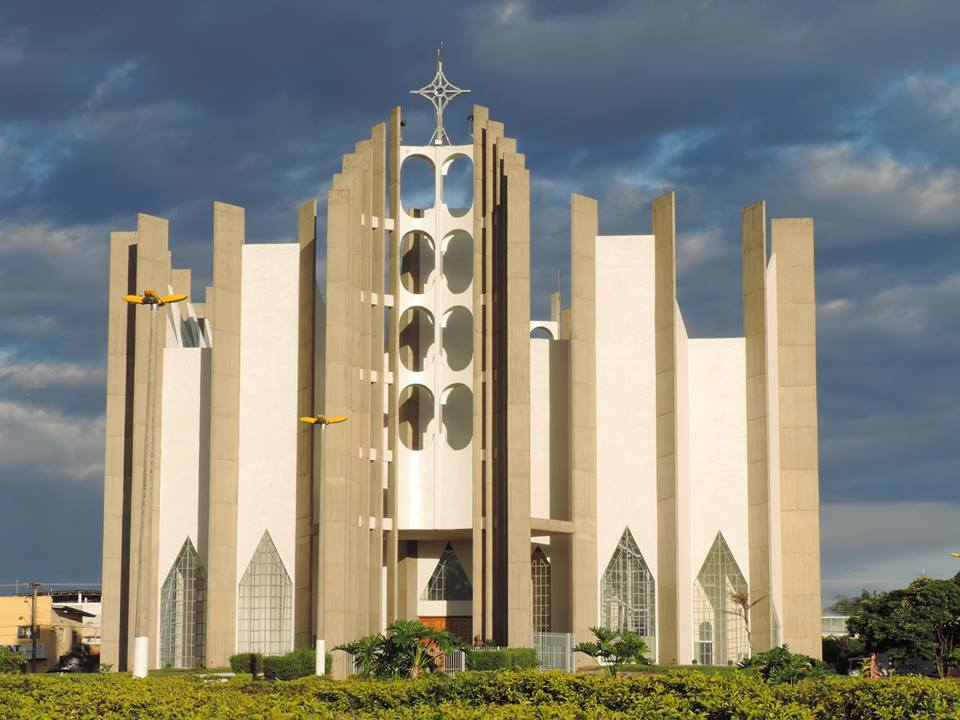

Location
- Country: Brazil
- Ecclesiastical province: Goiânia

Statistics
- Area: 62,978 km^{2} (24,316 sq mi)
- Population: Total; Catholics: (as of 2006); 543,000; 441,000 (81.2%)

Information
- Rite: Latin Rite
- Established: 26 March 1956 (70 years ago)
- Cathedral: Holy Spirit Cathedral, Jataí
- Patron saint: Our Lady of Guadalupe

Current leadership
- Pope: Leo XIV
- Bishop: Joaquim Carlos Carvalho, O.S.B.

Website
- https://www.diocesedejatai.org/

The Roman Catholic Diocese of Jataí (Latin: Dioecesis Iataiensis) is a diocese located in the city of Jataí in the ecclesiastical province of Goiânia in Brazil.

== History ==
On 21 June 1929 Pope Pius XI established the Territorial Prelature of Jataí from the Diocese of Goiás. Pope Pius XII elevated the prelature to the Diocese of Jataí on 26 March 1956.

On January 22, 2026, Pope Leo XIV proclaimed Our Lady of Guadalupe as the patroness of the diocese, through a decree from the Dicastery for Divine Worship and the Discipline of the Sacraments (Prot. N. 6/26).

== Bishops ==
=== Ordinaries ===
Prelates of Jataí

- Bishop Germán Vega Campón, O.S.A. (1941.04.19 – 1955.05.08)

Bishops of Jataí

- Bishop Abel Ribeiro Camelo (1957.01.17 – 1960.05.14), appointed Bishop of Goiás
- Bishop Benedito Domingos Vito Coscia, O.F.M. (1961.06.08 – 1999.02.24). Died 2008.04.30.
- Bishop Miguel Pedro Mundo (1999.02.24 – 1999.05.19). Died in office.
- Bishop Aloísio Hilário de Pinho, F.D.P. (1999.12.22 – 2009.12.16)
- Bishop José Luis Majella Delgado, C.Ss.R. (2010.03.06 – 2014.05.28), appointed Archbishop of Pouso Alegre, Minas Gerais
- Bishop Nélio Domingos Zortea (2015 – 2023.03.29), appointed Bishop of Cruz Alta, Rio Grande do Sul
- Bishop Joaquim Carlos Carvalho, O.S.B. (2023 - ...)

=== Auxiliary bishops of Jatai ===
- Miguel Pedro Mundo (1978.03.06 – 1999.02.24), appointed Bishop of Jataí
- Mathias William Schmidt, O.S.B. (1972.06.10 - 1976.05.14), appointed Bishop of Ruy Barbosa (Rui Barbosa), Bahia
