= Francisco Barroso Filho =

Brazilian Roman Catholic bishop (born 1928)

The Most Reverend Francisco Barroso Filho
- Bishop Emeritus of Oliveira
- Church: Roman Catholic Church
- Diocese: Diocese of Oliveira
- Appointed: 21 December 1983
- Term ended: 20 October 2004

Orders
- Ordination: 1 December 1957
- Consecration: 19 March 1984 by Oscar de Oliveira

Personal details
- Born: 8 October 1928 (age 98) Ouro Preto, Minas Gerais, Brazil
- Motto: In unitatem fidei

Francisco Barroso Filho (born 8 October 1928) is a Brazilian Roman Catholic prelate who served as the Bishop of the Diocese of Oliveira from 1983 until 2004.

== Early life and priesthood ==
Francisco Barroso Filho was born on 8 October 1928 in Ouro Preto, in the state of Minas Gerais, Brazil. He was ordained to the priesthood on 1 December 1957 for the Archdiocese of Mariana.

During his early priestly ministry, Barroso served in parish work and became involved in cultural, artistic, and musical initiatives, particularly connected to the historical and religious heritage of Ouro Preto.

== Episcopal ministry ==
On 21 December 1983, Barroso was appointed Bishop of the Diocese of Oliveira by Pope John Paul II. He received episcopal consecration on 19 March 1984, with Archbishop Oscar de Oliveira as the principal consecrator.

As bishop, Barroso emphasized pastoral unity, the promotion of priestly and religious vocations, and the strengthening of diocesan pastoral structures. His episcopal motto was In unitatem fidei (“For the unity of the faith”).

He governed the diocese for more than two decades, retiring on 20 October 2004 upon reaching the canonical age limit for bishops.

== Cultural and intellectual activity ==
In addition to his ecclesiastical ministry, Barroso is known for his contributions to Brazilian cultural and religious life. He is a musician and founded the Coral São Pio X and the Orquestra São Pio X in Ouro Preto. He also participated in initiatives related to sacred art, historical preservation, and religious music.

Barroso has authored books and essays on spirituality, sacred art, and personal recollections, and has delivered lectures at cultural and academic institutions, including the Academia Mineira de Letras.

== Later life ==
Following his retirement, Barroso has continued to reside in Ouro Preto, where he remains active in ecclesiastical celebrations and cultural events. His life and ministry have been the subject of biographical works and commemorations highlighting his role as a church leader and cultural figure in Minas Gerais.
