= Campo Belo =

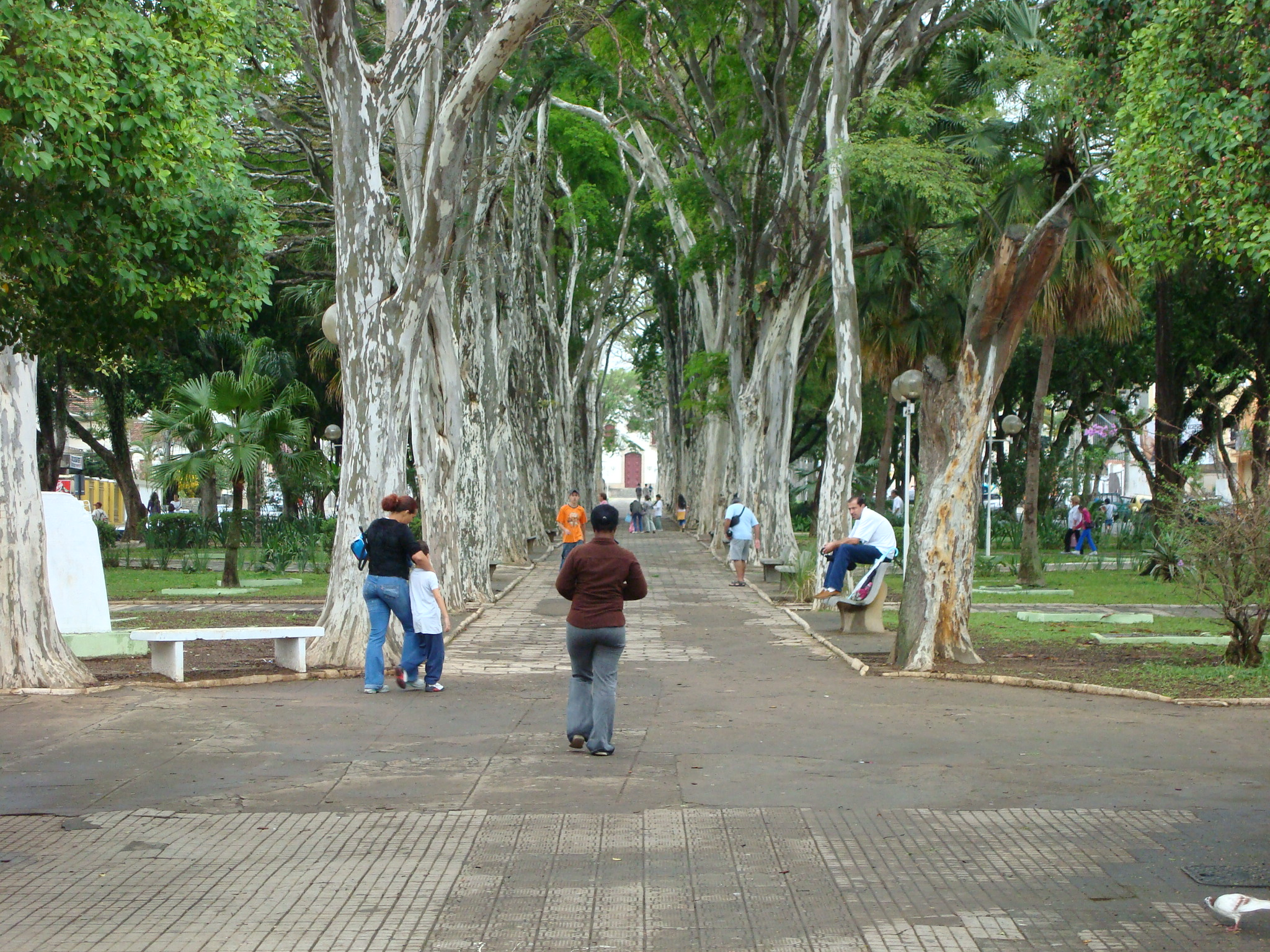
- View of Campo Belo's main square

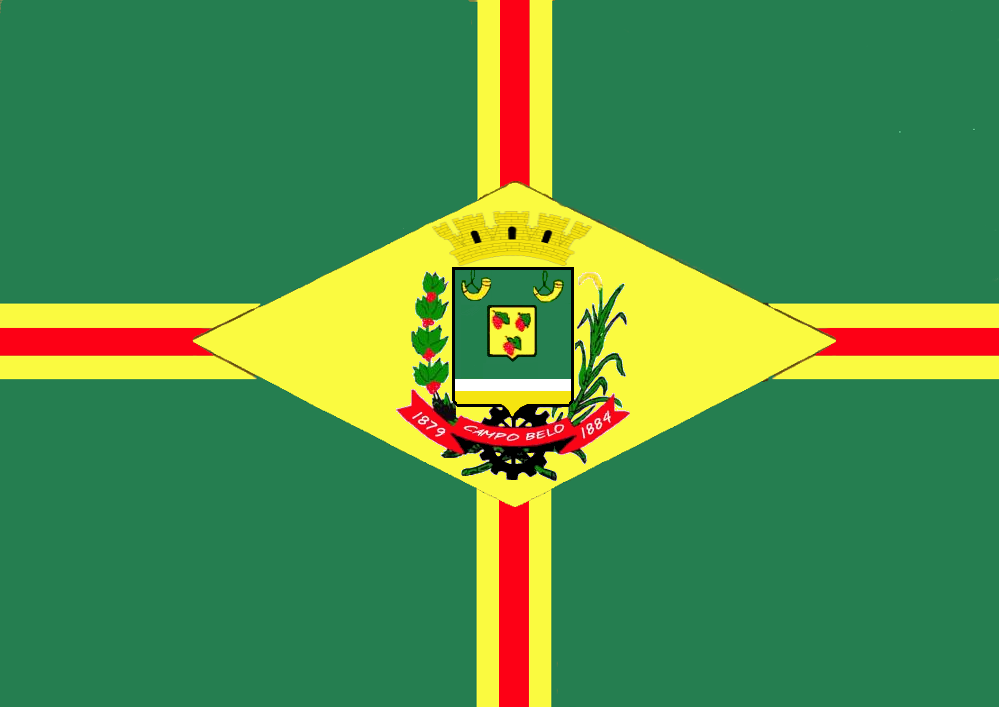
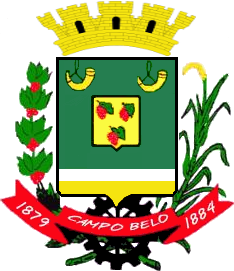
- Flag Coat of arms
- Motto: Portuguese: União, Ordem e Progresso (Union, Order and Progress)
- Location in Brazil

- Location within Brazil
- Coordinates: 20°53′49″S 45°16′37″W
- Country: Brazil
- Region: Southeast
- State: Minas Gerais
- Mesoregion: West of Minas Gerais
- Microregion: Campo Belo
- Founded: 1879

Government
  - Mayor: Tulio Miguel

Area
  - Total: 528.225 km^{2} (203.949 sq mi)
- Elevation: 945.0 m (3,100.4 ft)

Population (2020)
  - Total: 54,186
  - Density: 97.58/km^{2} (252.7/sq mi)
- Demonym: Campo-belense
- Time zone: UTC-3 (BRT)
  - Summer (DST): UTC-2 (BRST)
- HDI (2010): 0.711
- Website: Campo Belo, Minas Gerais

Campo Belo (Portuguese for "beautiful field") is a city located in Minas Gerais state, in Brazil. The estimated population in 2020 was 54,186 inhabitants, and the total area of the municipality was 528.225 square kilometres (203.949 sq mi). It was founded in 1879.

== Geography ==
=== Climate ===
Campo Belo's climate can be classified as tropical altitude, with yearly average temperature of 23.5 °C (74.3 °F). The Köppen climate classification of the region is Cwa (Tropical on high altitudes, humid/warm summer and a dry/cool winter).

Campo Belo

Climate chart (precipitation, max. and min. temperature)
J	F	M	A	M	J	J	A	S	O	N	D
177 28 18	155 29 18	111 28 18	35 27 16	39 25 14	11 24 12	9 24 11	10 26 12	42 27 14	75 28 16	135 28 17	170 28 18
- █ Average max. and min. temperatures in °C
- █ Precipitation totals in mm
- Source: MSN Weather
Imperial conversion
J	F	M	A	M	J	J	A	S	O	N	D
7 82 64	6.1 84 64	4.4 82 64	1.4 81 61	1.5 77 57	0.4 75 54	0.4 75 52	0.4 79 54	1.7 81 57	3 82 61	5.3 82 63	6.7 82 64
- █ Average max. and min. temperatures in °F
- █ Precipitation totals in inches

=== Soil ===
- Silic - Clay.

=== Topography ===
- Plain : 15%
- Waivy : 55%
- Mountain: 30%
