= Itaguara =

Town and municipality in the state of Minas Gerais, Brazil

Coordinates: 20°23′31″S 44°29′16″W

- Municipality
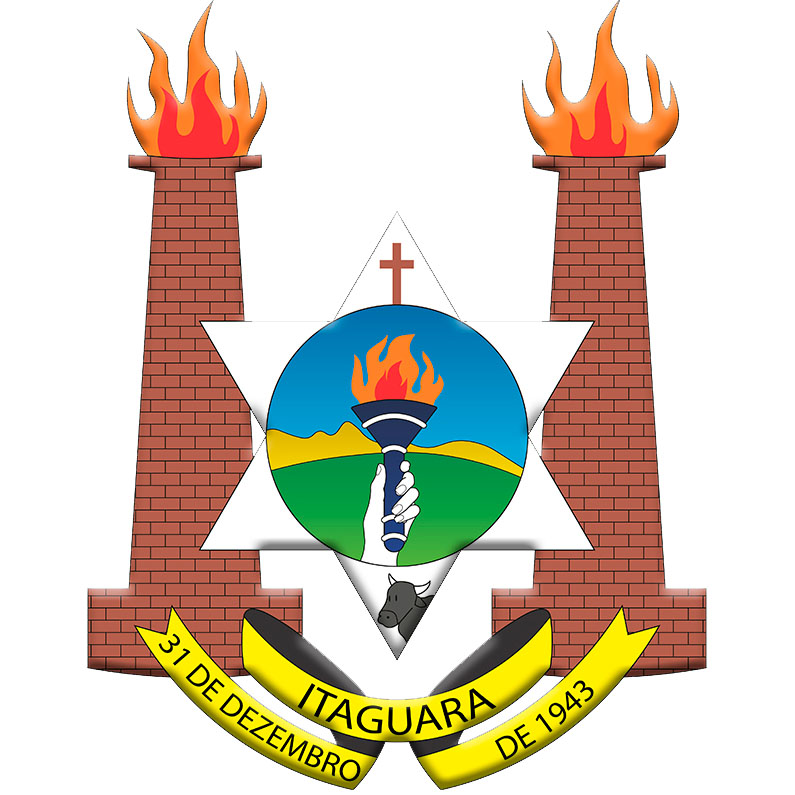
- Coat of arms
- Interactive map of Itaguara
- Country: Brazil
- State: Minas Gerais
- Region: Southeast

Population (2022 Census)
  - Total: 13,846
  - Estimate (2025): 14,415
- Time zone: UTC−3 (BRT)

Location of Itaguara within Minas Gerais

Itaguara is a Brazilian municipality in the state of Minas Gerais. Its population in 2025 was 14,415.

== Toponym ==
Itaguara is a coinage from Tupi–Guarani, meaning "wolf rock", by combining itá (rock) and guará (Wolf).

== See also ==
- List of municipalities in Minas Gerais
