= Passa Tempo =

Coordinates: 20.6508°S 44.4958°W

- Municipality
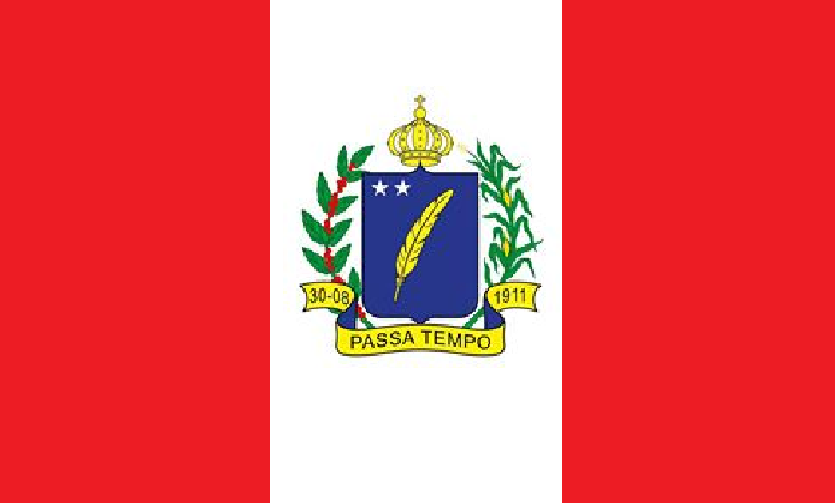
- Flag
- Interactive map of Passa Tempo
- Country: Brazil
- Region: Southeast
- State: Minas Gerais
- Mesoregion: Oeste de Minas

Government
  - Mayor: Edilson Rodrigues (PSB)

Population (2022 Census)
  - Total: 8,473
  - Estimate (2025): 8,716
- Time zone: UTC−3 (BRT)

Passa Tempo is a municipality in the state of Minas Gerais in the Southeast region of Brazil.

== See also ==
- List of municipalities in Minas Gerais
