= MG-050 (Minas Gerais highway) =

Highway in Minas Gerais, Brazil

MG-050

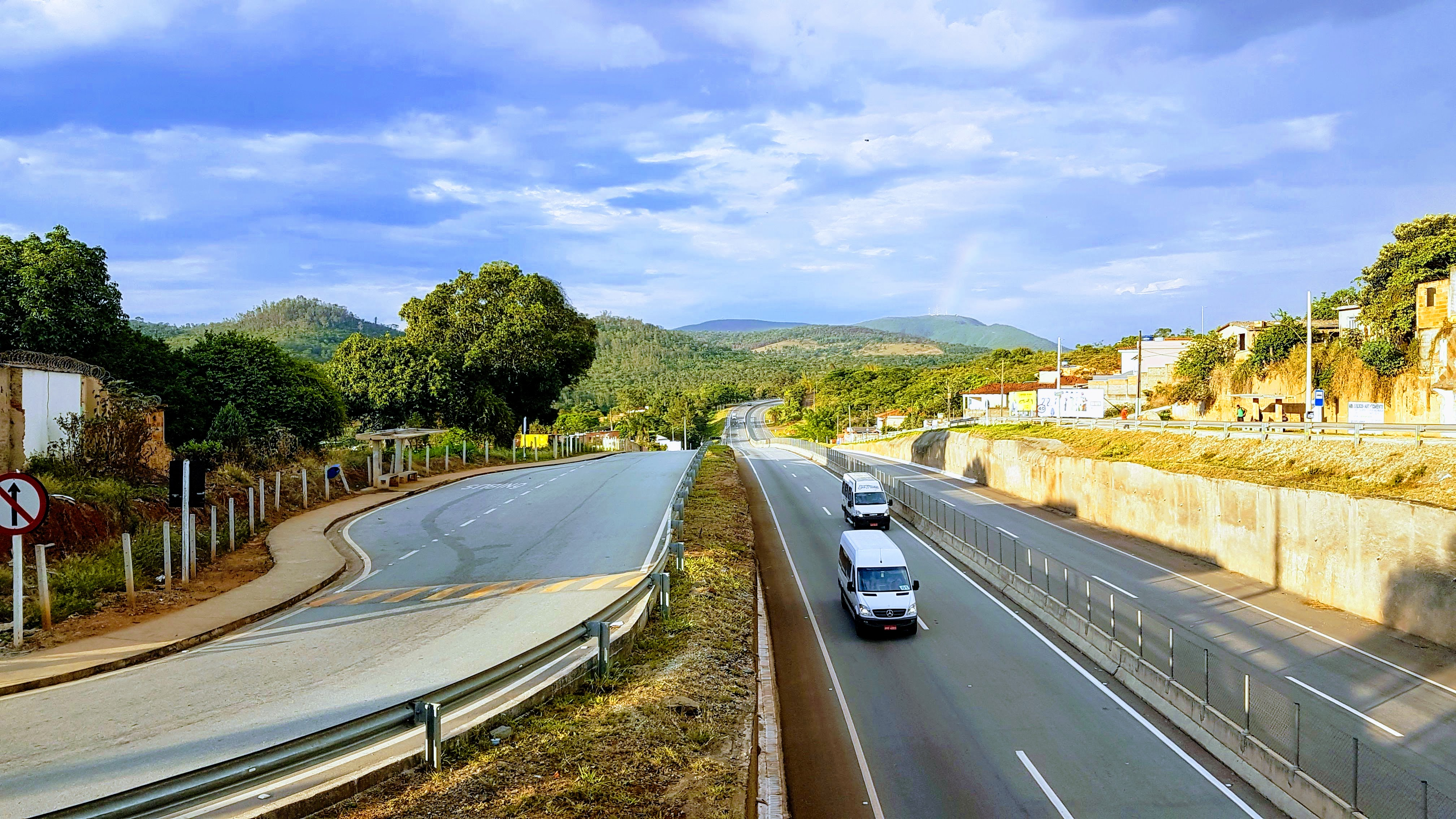
- MG-050 in Azurita, district of Mateus Leme

Route information
- Length: 406.7 km (252.7 mi)

Major junctions
- Northeast end: Betim
- Southwest end: São Sebastião do Paraíso

Location
- Country: Brazil
- State: Minas Gerais

Highway system
- Highways in Brazil; Federal; Minas Gerais State Highways

The MG-050, also called Newton Penido, is a state highway located in the Brazilian state of Minas Gerais. Its total length is 406.7 km (252.7 mi), and its entire network is paved.

== Route ==
MG-050 passes through the following municipalities:

- Belo Horizonte
- Betim
- Juatuba
- Mateus Leme
- Itaúna
- Igaratinga
- Carmo do Cajuru
- Divinópolis
- São Sebastião do Oeste
- Itapecerica
- Pedra do Indaiá
- Formiga
- Piumhi
- Córrego Fundo
- Pimenta
- Capitólio
- Passos
- Itaú de Minas
- Pratápolis
- São Sebastião do Paraíso
