= Pedra do Indaiá =

Town and municipality in state of Minas Gerais, Brazil

Coordinates: 20°15′28″S 45°12′32″W

- Municipality
- Interactive map of Pedra do Indaiá
- Country: Brazil
- State: Minas Gerais
- Region: Southeast

Population (2022 Census)
  - Total: 4/112
  - Estimate (2025): 4,247
- Time zone: UTC−3 (BRT)

Location of Pedra do Indaiá on a map of the state of Minas Gerais

Pedra do Indaiá is a Brazilian municipality. It is located in the center of the state of Minas Gerais. Pedra do Indaiá has a total area of 349 km^{2} (135 sq mi). As of 2025, it had an estimated population of 4,247. The city belongs to the meso-region of Oeste de Minas and to the micro-region of Formiga. It became a municipality in 1962.

== History ==
According to legend, an image of Jesus was left near a stone, referred to as Pedra. A chapel was constructed out of stone, and settlers built homes nearby. The settlement grew and was designated Senhor Bom Jesus da Pedra do Indaiá. In 1923, the settlement was renamed, becoming Pedra do Indaiá. In 1962, Pedra do Indaiá separated from Itapecerica and became a municipality.

== Geography ==
The center of Pedra do Indaiá is approximately halfway between Formiga and Divinópolis, with an elevation of 693 meters. It is just north of state highway MG-050, which connects Belo Horizonte to Passos. Neighboring municipalities include Santo Antônio do Monte (N), São Sebastião do Oeste (E), Itapecerica (S), and Formiga (W).

=== Distances to other cities ===
- Connection with BR-050: 6 km
- Belo Horizonte/MG - 173 km
- Formiga/MG - 46 km
- Divinópolis/MG - 40 km
- Santo Antônio do Monte/MG - 24 km

== Economy ==
Agriculture, general services, and various other small industries compose most of the economy in Pedra do Indaiá. As of 2005, there were 9 quarries and 13 transformation industries, with the latter employing 340 workers.

In 2005, the town's GDP was approximately R$29 million - 3 million reais from taxes, 11 million reais from various services, 9 million reais from the industrial sector, and 5 million reais from agriculture.

In 2006, 19,000 hectares of land were being cultivated by 463 farmers, 33 of whom had tractors, with a total of approximately 1,100 persons involved in some form of agriculture. The most produced crops included rice, beans, and corn, and there were 11,000 head of cattle as of 2006.

In 2007, the motor vehicle fleet comprised 482 automobiles, 51 trucks, 45 pickup trucks, and 223 motorcycles.

== Health and education ==
There are 6 public health clinics, one of which is specialized. Patients with more serious health conditions are transported to Formiga or Divinópolis. There are 4 primary schools, 1 middle school, and 1 pre-primary school, which serve 750 students.

=== Statistics ===
- Municipal Human Development Index: 0.755 (2000)
- State ranking: 249 out of 853 municipalities as of 2000
- National ranking: 1729 out of 5,138 municipalities as of 2000
- Literacy rate: 83%
- Life expectancy: 74 (average of males and females)

In 2000, the per capita monthly income in Pedra do Indaiá was R$183. This was well below the state and national average of R$276.00 and R$297.00, respectively.

== See also ==
- List of municipalities in Minas Gerais
