= 2025 Copa do Brasil =

Tournament details
- Country: Brazil
- Dates: 18 February – 21 December
- Teams: 92

Final positions
- Champions: Corinthians (4th title)
- Runners-up: Vasco da Gama
- 2026 Copa Libertadores: Corinthians

Tournament statistics
- Matches played: 122
- Goals scored: 279 (2.29 per match)
- Top goal scorer(s): Kaio Jorge; Rayan (5 goals each)

Awards
- Best player: Hugo Souza (Corinthians)
- Best goalkeeper: Hugo Souza (Corinthians)

The 2025 Copa do Brasil (officially the Copa Betano do Brasil 2025 for sponsorship reasons) was the 37th edition of Brazil's domestic cup, the Copa do Brasil. It was held from 18 February to 21 December 2025. Flamengo were the defending champions but they were eliminated in the round of 16 by Atlético Mineiro.

Corinthians defeated Vasco da Gama 2–1 in the final to win their fourth title. As champions, Corinthians qualified for the 2026 Copa Libertadores group stage and the 2026 Supercopa do Brasil.

== Qualified teams ==
Each state league received a number of berths based on their state ranking. The states chose how to distribute those berths between league placements and state cup champions. Teams in bold enter the competition in the third round.

Association	Team	Qualification method
Acre; 2 berths	Independência	2024 Campeonato Acreano champions
Acre; 2 berths	Humaitá	2024 Campeonato Acreano runners-up
Alagoas; 3 + 1 berths	**CRB**	**2024 Copa do Nordeste runners-up**
Alagoas; 3 + 1 berths	ASA	2024 Campeonato Alagoano runners-up
Alagoas; 3 + 1 berths	CSE	2024 Campeonato Alagoano 3rd place
Alagoas; 3 + 1 berths	CSA	2024 Campeonato Alagoano play-off winners
Amapá; 2 berths	Trem	2024 Campeonato Amapaense champions
Amapá; 2 berths	Oratório	2024 Campeonato Amapaense runners-up
Amazonas; 2 berths	Manaus	2024 Campeonato Amazonense champions
Amazonas; 2 berths	Amazonas	2024 Campeonato Amazonense runners-up
Bahia; 3 + 1 berths	**Bahia**	**2024 Série A 8th place**
Bahia; 3 + 1 berths	Vitória	2024 Campeonato Baiano champions
Bahia; 3 + 1 berths	Barcelona de Ilhéus	2024 Campeonato Baiano 3rd place
Bahia; 3 + 1 berths	Jequié	2024 Campeonato Baiano 4rd place
Ceará; 3 + 1 berths	**Fortaleza**	**2024 Série A 4th place**
Ceará; 3 + 1 berths	Ceará	2024 Campeonato Cearense champions
Ceará; 3 + 1 berths	Maracanã	2024 Campeonato Cearense 3rd place
Ceará; 3 + 1 berths	Ferroviário	2024 Copa Fares Lopes champions
Distrito Federal; 2 berths	Ceilândia	2024 Campeonato Brasiliense champions
Distrito Federal; 2 berths	Capital	2024 Campeonato Brasiliense runners-up
Espírito Santo; 2 berths	Rio Branco-ES	2024 Campeonato Capixaba champions
Espírito Santo; 2 berths	Rio Branco VN	2024 Campeonato Capixaba runners-up
Goiás; 3 berths	Atlético Goianiense	2024 Campeonato Goiano champions
Goiás; 3 berths	Vila Nova	2024 Campeonato Goiano runners-up
Goiás; 3 berths	Aparecidense	2024 Campeonato Goiano 3rd place
Maranhão; 2 berths	Sampaio Corrêa	2024 Campeonato Maranhense champions
Maranhão; 2 berths	Maranhão	2024 Campeonato Maranhense runners-up
Mato Grosso; 3 berths	Cuiabá	2024 Campeonato Mato-Grossense champions
Mato Grosso; 3 berths	União Rondonópolis	2024 Campeonato Mato-Grossense runners-up
Mato Grosso; 3 berths	CEOV	2024 Copa FMF champions
Mato Grosso do Sul; 2 berths	Operário-MS	2024 Campeonato Sul-Mato-Grossense champions
Mato Grosso do Sul; 2 berths	Dourados	2024 Campeonato Sul-Mato-Grossense runners-up
Minas Gerais; 5 + 1 berths	**Cruzeiro**	**2024 Série A 9th place**
Minas Gerais; 5 + 1 berths	Atlético Mineiro	2024 Campeonato Mineiro champions
Minas Gerais; 5 + 1 berths	América Mineiro	2024 Campeonato Mineiro 3rd place
Minas Gerais; 5 + 1 berths	Tombense	2024 Campeonato Mineiro 4th place
Minas Gerais; 5 + 1 berths	Pouso Alegre	2024 Campeonato Mineiro 6th place
Minas Gerais; 5 + 1 berths	Athletic	2024 Troféu Inconfidência champions
Pará; 3 + 1 berths	**Paysandu**	**2024 Copa Verde champions**
Pará; 3 + 1 berths	Remo	2024 Campeonato Paraense runners-up
Pará; 3 + 1 berths	Águia de Marabá	2024 Campeonato Paraense 4th place
Pará; 3 + 1 berths	Tuna Luso	2024 Copa Grão-Pará champions
Paraíba; 2 berths	Sousa	2024 Campeonato Paraibano champions
Paraíba; 2 berths	Botafogo-PB	2024 Campeonato Paraibano runners-up
Paraná; 5 berths	Athletico Paranaense	2024 Campeonato Paranaense champions
Paraná; 5 berths	Maringá	2024 Campeonato Paranaense runners-up
Paraná; 5 berths	Coritiba	2024 Campeonato Paranaense 3rd place
Paraná; 5 berths	Operário Ferroviário	2024 Campeonato Paranaense 4th place
Paraná; 5 berths	FC Cascavel	2024 Campeonato Paranaense 5th place
Pernambuco; 3 berths	Sport	2024 Campeonato Pernambucano champions
Pernambuco; 3 berths	Náutico	2024 Campeonato Pernambucano runners-up
Pernambuco; 3 berths	Retrô	2024 Campeonato Pernambucano 3rd place
Piauí; 2 berths	Altos	2023 Campeonato Piauiense champions
Piauí; 2 berths	Parnahyba	2024 Campeonato Piauiense runners-up
Rio de Janeiro; 6 + 1 + 1 berths	**Flamengo**	**2024 Copa do Brasil champions**
Rio de Janeiro; 6 + 1 + 1 berths	**Botafogo**	**2024 Copa Libertadores champions**
Rio de Janeiro; 6 + 1 + 1 berths	Nova Iguaçu	2024 Campeonato Carioca runners-up
Rio de Janeiro; 6 + 1 + 1 berths	Vasco da Gama	2024 Campeonato Carioca 3rd place
Rio de Janeiro; 6 + 1 + 1 berths	Fluminense	2024 Campeonato Carioca 4th place
Rio de Janeiro; 6 + 1 + 1 berths	Boavista	2024 Campeonato Carioca 6th place
Rio de Janeiro; 6 + 1 + 1 berths	Portuguesa-RJ	2024 Campeonato Carioca 7th place
Rio de Janeiro; 6 + 1 + 1 berths	Olaria	2024 Copa Rio runners-up
Rio Grande do Norte; 3 berths	América de Natal	2024 Campeonato Potiguar champions
Rio Grande do Norte; 3 berths	Santa Cruz de Natal	2024 Campeonato Potiguar runners-up
Rio Grande do Norte; 3 berths	ABC	2024 Campeonato Potiguar 3rd Palace
Rio Grande do Sul; 5 +1 berths	**Internacional**	**2024 Série A 5th place**
Rio Grande do Sul; 5 +1 berths	Grêmio	2024 Campeonato Gaúcho champions
Rio Grande do Sul; 5 +1 berths	Juventude	2024 Campeonato Gaúcho runners-up
Rio Grande do Sul; 5 +1 berths	Caxias	2024 Campeonato Gaúcho 4th place
Rio Grande do Sul; 5 +1 berths	Guarany de Bagé	2024 Campeonato Gaúcho 5th place
Rio Grande do Sul; 5 +1 berths	São José-RS	2024 Copa FGF champions
Rondônia; 2 berths	Porto Velho	2024 Campeonato Rondoniense champions
Rondônia; 2 berths	Barcelona-RO	2024 Campeonato Rondoniense runners-up
Roraima; 2 berths	GAS	2024 Campeonato Roraimense champions
Roraima; 2 berths	São Raimundo-RR	2024 Campeonato Roraimense runners-up
Santa Catarina; 3 berths	Criciúma	2024 Campeonato Catarinense champions
Santa Catarina; 3 berths	Brusque	2024 Campeonato Catarinense runners-up
Santa Catarina; 3 berths	Concórdia	2024 Copa Santa Catarina champions
São Paulo; 6 + 3 + 1 berths	**Palmeiras**	**2024 Série A runners-up**
São Paulo; 6 + 3 + 1 berths	**São Paulo**	**2024 Série A 6th place**
São Paulo; 6 + 3 + 1 berths	**Corinthians**	**2024 Série A 7th place**
São Paulo; 6 + 3 + 1 berths	**Santos**	**2024 Série B champions**
São Paulo; 6 + 3 + 1 berths	Red Bull Bragantino	2024 Campeonato Paulista 3rd place
São Paulo; 6 + 3 + 1 berths	Novorizontino	2024 Campeonato Paulista 4th place
São Paulo; 6 + 3 + 1 berths	Inter de Limeira	2024 Campeonato Paulista 6th place
São Paulo; 6 + 3 + 1 berths	Ponte Preta	2024 Campeonato Paulista 7th place
São Paulo; 6 + 3 + 1 berths	Portuguesa	2024 Campeonato Paulista 8th place
São Paulo; 6 + 3 + 1 berths	Votuporanguense	2024 Copa Paulista runners-up
Sergipe; 2 berths	Confiança	2024 Campeonato Sergipano champions
Sergipe; 2 berths	Sergipe	2024 Campeonato Sergipano runners-up
Tocantins; 2 berths	União-TO	2024 Campeonato Tocantinense champions
Tocantins; 2 berths	Tocantinópolis	2024 Campeonato Tocantinense runners-up

== Schedule ==
On 12 November 2024, CBF published the 2025 Copa do Brasil schedule:

Single-legged rounds
Stage	Week 1	Week 2
First round	18 February	27 February
Second round	5 March	12 March

Two-legged rounds
Stage	First leg	Second leg
Third round	30 April	21 May
Round of 16	30 July	6 August
Quarter-finals	27 August	11 September
Semi-finals	10 December	14 December
Finals	17 December	21 December

== Single-legged rounds ==
The draw for the first and second rounds was held on 7 February 2025 at the CBF headquarters in Rio de Janeiro. Teams were seeded into eight groups as per their national ranking. Matches were drawn using pot A vs E, B vs F, C vs G, and D vs H; lower-ranked teams host the match in the first round.

Draw

Each CBF team's ranking is shown in parentheses.

Pot A	Pot B	Pot C	Pot D
Atlético Mineiro (5); Athletico Paranaense (6); Fluminense (7); Grêmio (10); América Mineiro (13); Red Bull Bragantino (14); Vasco da Gama (15); Atlético Goianiense (17); Juventude (18); Cuiabá (20)	Ceará (22); Vitória (23); Coritiba (24); Sport (25); Criciúma (26); Vila Nova (29); Operário Ferroviário (31); Ponte Preta (33); Brusque (35); Sampaio Corrêa (36)	Novorizontino (39); Tombense (40); CSA (42); ABC (43); Remo (44); Náutico (46); Amazonas (49); Confiança (50); Ferroviário (51); Botafogo-PB (53)	América de Natal (55); Manaus (56); São José-RS (57); Aparecidense (59); Altos (62); Retrô (63); Caxias (64); Athletic (66); Nova Iguaçu (67); Portuguesa-RJ (68)
Pot E	Pot F	Pot G	Pot H
Sousa (69); Águia de Marabá (70); Tocantinópolis (71); São Raimundo-RR (72); Maringá (73); FC Cascavel (76); Pouso Alegre (77); ASA (79); União Rondonópolis (82); Porto Velho (87)	Sergipe (88); Humaitá (=89); Trem (=89); Ceilândia (94); Inter de Limeira (86); Maranhão (103); CEOV (105); Tuna Luso (106); Operário-MS (114); Concórdia (125)	CSE (132); Boavista (142); Parnahyba (144); Maracanã (=153); Santa Cruz de Natal (=153); GAS (176); Rio Branco-ES (186); Rio Branco de Venda Nova (202); Olaria (208); Portuguesa (213)	Votuporanguense (—); Guarany de Bagé (—); Barcelona de Ilhéus (—); Jequié (—); Capital (—); Independência (—); União-TO (—); Barcelona-RO (—); Dourados (—); Oratório (—)

=== First round ===
The first round was contest by 80 teams and they played between 18 and 27 February 2025, in a single knock-out match format. The 40 winning teams advanced to the second round.

Times are BRT (UTC–3), as listed by CBF (local times, if different, are in parentheses).

19 February 2025	ASA	1–1 (5–6 p)	Atlético Goianiense	Arapiraca
21:30	Chudo 66'	Report	Caio Dantas 42'	Stadium: Coaracy da Mata Fonseca; Attendance: 5,141; Referee: Edina Alves Batista (São Paulo)

26 February 2025	Jequié	1–2	Retrô	Jequié
19:30	João Grilo 22'	Report	Fabinho 24'; Claudinho 36'	Stadium: Waldomiro Borges; Attendance: 1,018; Referee: Wallas Martins Lopes (Maranhão)

19 February 2025	Tuna Luso	1–0	Sampaio Corrêa	Belém
15:30	Dedé 85'	Report		Stadium: Francisco Vasques; Attendance: 914; Referee: Alisson Sidnei Furtado (Tocantins)

19 February 2025	Boavista	0–2	CSA	Saquarema
19:30		Report	Igor Bahia 23'; Betão 81'	Stadium: Elcyr Resende de Mendonça; Attendance: 937; Referee: Emerson Ricardo de Almeida Andrade (Bahia)

18 February 2025	União Rondonópolis	0–3	Vasco da Gama	Cariacica
21:30		Report	Vegetti 48' (pen.); Rayan 81'; Hugo Moura 89'	Stadium: Kleber Andrade; Attendance: 5,594; Referee: Rodrigo José Pereira de Lima (Pernambuco)

26 February 2025	Barcelona-RO	1–4	Nova Iguaçu	Porto Velho
20:00 (19:00 AMT)	João 1'	Report	Gabriel 3', 22'; Victor Rangel 50'; Alexandre 79'	Stadium: Aluizão; Attendance: 410; Referee: Lucas Costa Modesto (Distrito Federal)

26 February 2025	Humaitá	0–0 (1–3 p)	Operário Ferroviário	Rio Branco
21:00 (19:00 ACT)		Report		Stadium: Arena da Floresta; Attendance: 1,483; Referee: João Vitor Gobi (São Paulo)

26 February 2025	CSE	1–3	Tombense	Palmeira dos Índios
19:00	João Victor 87'	Report	João Vitor 4'; Anderson Ligeiro 11'; Cleiton 90'	Stadium: Juca Sampaio; Attendance: 2,017; Referee: Arthur Gomes Rabelo (Espírito Santo)

25 February 2025	Pouso Alegre	0–2	Athletico Paranaense	Pouso Alegre
21:30		Report	Luiz Fernando 5'; Velasco 74'	Stadium: Manduzão; Attendance: 4,507; Referee: Bráulio da Silva Machado (Santa Catarina)

26 February 2025	Guarany de Bagé	2–1	Altos	Bagé
19:00	Yan 52'; Alberte 88' (o.g.)	Report	Reis 47'	Stadium: Estrela D'Alva; Attendance: 2,378; Referee: Júlio César Pfleger (Santa Catarina)

27 February 2025	Ceilândia	2–2 (4–2 p)	Coritiba	Ceilândia
19:00	Clemente 51', 69'	Report	Lucas Ronier 55'; Bianqui 90+2'	Stadium: Abadião; Attendance: 2,669; Referee: Alex Gomes Stefano (Rio de Janeiro)

26 February 2025	Maracanã	1–1 (5–4 p)	Ferroviário	Horizonte
20:00	Luan Lucas 77'	Report	Ciel 31'	Stadium: Domingão; Attendance: 312; Referee: Tarcizo Pinheiro Caetano (Rio de Janeiro)

19 February 2025	Porto Velho	0–0 (4–3 p)	Cuiabá	Porto Velho
20:00 (19:00 AMT)		Report		Stadium: Aluizão; Attendance: 2,231; Referee: Antônio Dib Moraes de Sousa (Piauí)

19 February 2025	Capital	0–0 (5–3 p)	Portuguesa-RJ	Paranoá
20:00		Report		Stadium: JK Paranoá; Attendance: 4,998; Referee: Fábio Augusto Santos Sá Junior (Sergipe)

19 February 2025	Sergipe	0–2	Ceará	Aracaju
20:00		Report	Pedro Henrique 16' (pen.); Diego 61'	Stadium: Batistão; Attendance: 0 (closed doors); Referee: Felipe Fernandes de Lima (Minas Gerais)

26 February 2025	Parnahyba	0–5	Confiança	Teresina
20:00		Report	Breyner 10'; André Lima 15'; Fábio 32' (pen.); Neto 37'; Ronald 59'	Stadium: Albertão; Attendance: 413; Referee: Felipe Fernandes de Lima (Minas Gerais)

25 February 2025	Maringá	1–0	Juventude	Maringá
19:30	Cauã 18'	Report		Stadium: Willie Davids; Attendance: 7,868; Referee: Gustavo Ervino Bauermann (Santa Catarina)

26 February 2025	União-TO	4–2	América de Natal	Araguaína
20:00	Jean Bala 43', 47'; Allan Rosário 45+2'; Gabriel 60'	Report	Ricardo Bueno 3'; Lucas 7'	Stadium: Mirandão; Attendance: 2,599; Referee: Daniel Alejandro Hidalgo Blanco (Roraima)

26 February 2025	Concórdia	2–1	Ponte Preta	Concórdia
21:30	Felipinho 44'; José Weliton 50'	Report	Everton 13'	Stadium: Domingos Machado de Lima; Attendance: 1,302; Referee: Lucas Casagrande (Paraná)

27 February 2025	Portuguesa	1–1 (3–4 p)	Botafogo-PB	São Paulo
21:00	Rildo 12'	Report	Rodrigo 4'	Stadium: Pacamebu; Attendance: 2,036; Referee: Jonathan Benkenstein Pinheiro (Rio Grande do Sul)

19 February 2025	São Raimundo-RR	1–1 (1–4 p)	Grêmio	Boa Vista
19:30 (18:30 AMT)	Kante 65'	Report	Olivera 90+3'	Stadium: Canarinho; Attendance: 5,000; Referee: Gustavo Ervino Bauermann (Santa Catarina)

25 February 2025	Barcelona de Ilhéus	1–2	Athletic	Jequié
19:30	Alesandro 85'	Report	Edson Alves 26'; Welinton 43'	Stadium: Waldomiro Borges; Attendance: 97; Referee: Paulo Henrique Schleich Vollkopf (Mato Grosso do Sul)

25 February 2025	Maranhão	0–1	Vitória	São Luís
19:00		Report	Gabriel Baralhas 80'	Stadium: Castelão; Attendance: 673; Referee: Bruno Arleu de Araújo (Rio de Janeiro)

19 February 2025	Santa Cruz de Natal	0–4	Náutico	Natal
19:00		Report	Paulo Sérgio 27'; Sousa 68'; Bruno Mezenga 78'; Kayon 86'	Stadium: Frasqueirão; Attendance: 336; Referee: Fernando Antônio Mendes de Salles Nascimento Filho (Pará)

27 February 2025	Sousa	1–1 (4–5 p)	Red Bull Bragantino	Sousa
21:30	Augusto 53'	Report	Patrik 90+10' (o.g.)	Stadium: Marizão; Attendance: 3,086; Referee: Caio Max Augusto Vieira (Goiás)

26 February 2025	Oratório	1–3	São José-RS	Macapá
20:00	Aldair 45'	Report	Giovane 52', 87'; Fábio 75' (pen.)	Stadium: Zerão; Attendance: 0 (closed doors); Referee: José Ricardo Vasconcellos Laranjeira (Alagoas)

25 February 2025	Operário-MS	0–1	Criciúma	Campo Grande
20:00 (19:00 AMT)		Report	Everton Morelli 8'	Stadium: Jacques da Luz; Attendance: 3,292; Referee: Paulo César Zanovelli da Silva (Minas Gerais)

26 February 2025	GAS	0–4	Remo	Boa Vista
20:30 (19:30 AMT)		Report	Jáderson 15'; Pedro Rocha 55'; Ytalo 58'; Maxwell 83'	Stadium: Canarinho; Attendance: 2,109; Referee: Lucas Canetto Bellote (São Paulo)

26 February 2025	FC Cascavel	1–0	América Mineiro	Cascavel
19:00	Lucas Serafini 32'	Report		Stadium: Olímpico Regional; Attendance: 1,595; Referee: Wagner do Nascimento Magalhães (Rio de Janeiro)

26 February 2025	Votuporanguense	2–2 (4–5 p)	Aparecidense	Votuporanga
19:30	Gabriel 73'; Pedrinho 90+2'	Report	João Marcos 39'; Higor Leite 85'	Stadium: Arena Plínio Marin; Attendance: 2,507; Referee: Raimundo Rodrigues de Oliveira Junior (Ceará)

27 February 2025	Inter de Limeira	0–0 (6–7 p)	Vila Nova	Limeira
21:30		Report		Stadium: Major José Levy Sobrinho; Attendance: 1,409; Referee: Lucas Paulo Torezin (Paraná)

20 February 2025	Rio Branco de Venda Nova	0–0 (5–3 p)	Amazonas	Cariacica
20:00		Report		Stadium: Kleber Andrade; Attendance: 1,804; Referee: José Magno Teixeira do Nascimento (Rio Grande do Norte)

18 February 2025	Tocantinópolis	0–2	Atlético Mineiro	Tocantinópolis
18:00		Report	Hulk 87' (pen.); Rony 90+5'	Stadium: João Ribeiro; Attendance: 5,495; Referee: Marcelo de Lima Henrique (Ceará)

19 February 2025	Independência	1–1 (2–4 p)	Manaus	Rio Branco
21:00 (19:00 ACT)	Anderson Brito 69'	Report	Lelo 71'	Stadium: Arena da Floresta; Attendance: 1,829; Referee: Thaillan Azevedo Gomes (Amapá)

19 February 2025	Trem	0–2	Brusque	Macapá
20:30		Report	Pollero 40'; Diego Mathias 90+1'	Stadium: Zerão; Attendance: 0 (closed doors); Referee: Jonathan Antero Silva (Rondônia)

20 February 2025	Olaria	1–0	ABC	Rio de Janeiro
21:30	Wesley 34'	Report		Stadium: Moça Bonita; Attendance: 99; Referee: Anderson Ribeiro Gonçalves (Goiás)

26 February 2025	Águia de Marabá	0–8	Fluminense	Belém
19:30		Report	Canobbio 11'; Cano 14', 31'; Ignácio 45'; Paulo Baya 68'; Arias 70'; Everaldo 78'; Serna 81'	Stadium: Mangueirão; Attendance: 4,455; Referee: Davi de Oliveira Lacerda (Espírito Santo)

26 February 2025	Dourados	0–2	Caxias	Dourados
16:00 (15:00 AMT)		Report	Bastos 65' (pen.), 90+4'	Stadium: Douradão; Attendance: 1,184; Referee: Fabiano Monteiro dos Santos (São Paulo)

25 February 2025	CEOV	0–0 (4–2 p)	Sport	Cuiabá
21:30 (20:30 AMT)		Report		Stadium: Eurico Gaspar Dutra; Attendance: 1,511; Referee: Sávio Sampaio (Distrito Federal)

27 February 2025	Rio Branco-ES	1–3	Novorizontino	Cariacica
20:00	Donato 14' (o.g.)	Report	Robson 45+4'; Marlon 83', 87'	Stadium: Kleber Andrade; Attendance: 7,512; Referee: Jefferson Ferreira de Moraes (Goiás)

=== Second round ===
The second round was contest by the 40 teams qualified from the first round and they played between 4 and 13 March 2025, in a single knock-out match format. The 20 winning teams advanced to the third round.

Times are BRT (UTC–3), as listed by CBF (local times, if different, are in parentheses).

12 March 2025	Atlético Goianiense	1–1 (1–4 p)	Retrô	Goiânia
21:30	Caio Dantas 60'	Report	Maycon 40'	Stadium: Antônio Accioly; Attendance: 2,492; Referee: Wagner do Nascimento Magalhães (Rio de Janeiro)
	Penalties
	William Pottker (penalty scored); Guilherme Romão (penalty missed); Araos (penalty missed)		(penalty scored) Grafite; (penalty scored) Ericson; (penalty scored) Radsley; (penalty scored) Ly

13 March 2025	CSA	5–0	Tuna Luso	Maceió
21:30	Guilherme Cachoeira 2'; Klenisson 17'; Tiago Marques 19', 23'; Brayann 60'	Report		Stadium: Rei Pelé; Attendance: 6,078; Referee: Lucas Paulo Torezin (Paraná)

5 March 2025	Nova Iguaçu	0–3	Vasco da Gama	Rio de Janeiro
21:30		Report	Rayan 9'; Coutinho 20' (pen.), 38'	Stadium: Nilton Santos; Attendance: 9,351; Referee: Anderson Daronco (Rio Grande do Sul)

12 March 2025	Operário Ferroviário	1–0	Tombense	Ponta Grossa
19:30	Roger Carvalho 1' (o.g.)	Report		Stadium: Germano Krüger; Attendance: 3,690; Referee: Sávio Sampaio (Distrito Federal)

13 March 2025	Athletico Paranaense	3–1	Guarany de Bagé	Curitiba
19:30	Luiz Fernando 12', 40', 73'	Report	Yan 58'	Stadium: Arena da Baixada; Attendance: 15,675; Referee: Flávio Rodrigues de Souza (São Paulo)

12 March 2025	Maracanã	0–0 (4–3 p)	Ceilândia	Horizonte
20:00		Report		Stadium: Domingão; Attendance: 229; Referee: André Luiz Skettino Policarpo Bento (Minas Gerais)
	Penalties
	Jair Berlitz (penalty scored); Luan Lucas (penalty missed); Jairo (penalty scored); Leandro Cerqueira (penalty scored); Rafael Mandacaru (penalty missed); Matheus Lima (penalty scored)		(penalty scored) Pedro Bambu; (penalty missed) Lagoa; (penalty missed) Valter Bala; (penalty scored) Diego Bolt; (penalty scored) Rafael Sayão; (penalty missed) Kennedy Cordeiro

12 March 2025	Capital	3–1	Porto Velho	Paranoá
20:00	Rikelmi 34'; Rodriguinho 37'; Deysinho 85'	Report	Emerson 90+3'	Stadium: JK Paranoá; Attendance: 4,423; Referee: Bruno Pereira Vasconcelos (Bahia)

12 March 2025	Ceará	2–2 (3–0 p)	Confiança	Fortaleza
21:30	Pedro Raul 73'; Galeano 84'	Report	Ronald 9'; Fábio 35'	Stadium: Castelão; Attendance: 11,996; Referee: Davi de Oliveira Lacerda (Espírito Santo)
	Penalties
	Fernando Sobral (penalty scored); Galeano (penalty scored); Rômulo (penalty scored)		(penalty missed) Fábio; (penalty missed) Airton; (penalty missed) André

6 March 2025	Maringá	4–2	União-TO	Maringá
19:30	Maranhão 1', 24'; Zé Vitor 13' (pen.); Moraes 42'	Report	Jhonattas Brasileiro 38'; Allan Rosário 72'	Stadium: Willie Davids; Attendance: 8,060; Referee: Jefferson Ferreira de Moraes (Goiás)

11 March 2025	Botafogo-PB	4–0	Concórdia	João Pessoa
21:30	Marcelo Gama 25'; Guilherme Santos 33'; Rodrigo Alves 49'; Henrique Dourado 63'	Report		Stadium: Almeidão; Attendance: 5,231; Referee: Alex Gomes Stefano (Rio de Janeiro)

12 March 2025	Athletic	3–3 (7–8 p)	Grêmio	São João del-Rei
19:30	David 2'; Diego Fumaça 47'; João Lucas 90+3' (o.g.)	Report	Braithwaite 10'; João Lucas 20'; Arezo 87'	Stadium: Joaquim Portugal; Attendance: 3,600; Referee: Matheus Delgado Candançan (São Paulo)
	Penalties
	David (penalty scored); Diego Fumaça (penalty scored); Yuri (penalty scored); Wesley Gasolina (penalty scored); Mateus Gonçalves (penalty scored); Neto Costa (penalty scored); Alexsandro (penalty scored); Edson Alves (penalty missed)		(penalty scored) Wagner Leonardo; (penalty scored) Jemerson; (penalty scored) Arezo; (penalty scored) Olivera; (penalty scored) Dodi; (penalty scored) Camilo; (penalty scored) Gustavo Martins; (penalty scored) João Lucas

12 March 2025	Vitória	0–2	Náutico	Salvador
19:00		Report	Hélio 27'; Buiú 35'	Stadium: Barradão; Attendance: 16,754; Referee: Paulo César Zanovelli da Silva (Minas Gerais)

11 March 2025	Red Bull Bragantino	1–1 (4–2 p)	São José-RS	Bragança Paulista
21:30	Jhon Jhon 5'	Report	Lailson 48'	Stadium: Nabi Abi Chedid; Attendance: 1,760; Referee: Rodrigo José Pereira de Lima (Pernambuco)
	Penalties
	Eduardo Sasha (penalty scored); Fernando (penalty scored); Jhon Jhon (penalty scored); Cleiton (penalty scored)		(penalty missed) Fábio; (penalty scored) Giovane; (penalty missed) Danielzinho; (penalty scored) Douglas

11 March 2025	Remo	1–2	Criciúma	Belém
19:30	Ytalo 45+2'	Report	Luciano Castán 27'; Werik Popó 79'	Stadium: Mangueirão; Attendance: 14,487; Referee: Wilton Sampaio (Goiás)

4 March 2025	Aparecidense	1–0	FC Cascavel	Aparecida de Goiânia
21:30	Higor Leite 90+5'	Report		Stadium: Annibal Batista de Toledo; Attendance: 754; Referee: Yuri Elino Ferreira da Cruz (Rio de Janeiro)

13 March 2025	Vila Nova	6–0	Rio Branco de Venda Nova	Goiânia
21:30	Gabriel Poveda 8'; Jean Mota 63'; Tiago Pagnussat 71'; Torres 74'; Elias 80'; Gabriel Silva 82'	Report		Stadium: Serra Dourada; Attendance: 7,465; Referee: Maguielson Lima Barbosa (Distrito Federal)

5 March 2025	Atlético Mineiro	4–1	Manaus	Belo Horizonte
19:30	Alisson 17'; Cuello 31'; Rony 48'; Deyverson 65'	Report	Renan 52'	Stadium: Mineirão; Attendance: 15,815; Referee: Ramon Abatti (Santa Catarina)

6 March 2025	Olaria	1–2	Brusque	Rio de Janeiro
21:30	Cipriano 73'	Report	Jhan Pool 34'; Diego Mathias 81'	Stadium: Luso Brasileiro; Attendance: 918; Referee: Denis da Silva Ribeiro Serafim (Alagoas)

5 March 2025	Caxias	1–2	Fluminense	Caxias do Sul
19:00	Alisson 68'	Report	Cano 40', 65'	Stadium: Centenário; Attendance: 4,870; Referee: Raphael Claus (São Paulo)

11 March 2025	CEOV	0–1	Novorizontino	Cuiabá
19:00 (18:00 AMT)		Report	Waguininho 44'	Stadium: Eurico Gaspar Dutra; Attendance: 1,438; Referee: Gustavo Ervino Bauermann (Santa Catarina)

== Two-legged rounds ==
=== Third round ===
The draw for the third round was held on 9 April 2025 at the CBF headquarters in Rio de Janeiro. The 20 teams qualified from the previous round additionally to the 12 teams that will be enter from this round were placed into two pots, seeded by their national ranking, and then drawn into 16 ties. The competition from this round onwards will be played on a home-and-away two-legged basis. The winning teams advanced to the round of 16.

==== Draw ====
Each CBF team's ranking is shown in parentheses and the teams entering from this round are in bold.

Pot A	Pot B
**Flamengo** (1); **São Paulo** (2); **Palmeiras** (3); **Corinthians** (4); Atlético Mineiro (5); Athletico Paranaense (6); Fluminense (7); **Botafogo** (8); **Fortaleza** (9); Grêmio (10); **Bahia** (11); **Internacional** (12); Red Bull Bragantino (14); Vasco da Gama (15); **Santos** (16); **Cruzeiro** (19)	Ceará (22); Criciúma (26); **CRB** (27); Vila Nova (29); Operário Ferroviário (31); Brusque (35); Novorizontino (39); **Paysandu** (41); CSA (42); Náutico (46); Botafogo-PB (53); Aparecidense (59); Retrô (63); Maringá (73); Maracanã (153); Capital (—)

==== Matches ====
The third round pairings are:

Team 1	Agg.	Team 2	1st leg	2nd leg
Operário Ferroviário	2–2 (6–7 p)	**Vasco da Gama**	1–1	1–1
**Fluminense**	5–1	Aparecidense	1–0	4–1
Paysandu	0–5	**Bahia**	0–1	0–4
**Botafogo**	4–1	Capital	4–0	0–1
**Internacional**	4–0	Maracanã	1–0	3–0
**Retrô**	2–2 (4–1 p)	Fortaleza	1–1	1–1
Brusque	0–1	**Athletico Paranaense**	0–0	0–1
Ceará	0–4	**Palmeiras**	0–1	0–3
Maringá	2–6	**Atlético Mineiro**	2–2	0–4
Botafogo-PB	2–5	**Flamengo**	0–1	2–4
**São Paulo**	4–2	Náutico	2–1	2–1
**Cruzeiro**	5–0	Vila Nova	2–0	3–0
Santos	1–1 (4–5 p)	**CRB**	1–1	0–0
Novorizontino	0–2	**Corinthians**	0–1	0–1
Criciúma	1–6	**Red Bull Bragantino**	1–0	0–6
**CSA**	3–2	Grêmio	3–2	0–0

==== First leg ====
1 May 2025	**Operário Ferroviário**	**1–1**	**Vasco da Gama**	Ponta Grossa
16:00	Boschilia 71'	Report	Moreira 20'	Stadium: Germano Krüger; Attendance: 7,248; Referee: Anderson Daronco (Rio Grande do Sul)

29 April 2025	**Fluminense**	**1–0**	**Aparecidense**	Rio de Janeiro
21:30	Keno 81'	Report		Stadium: Maracanã; Attendance: 8,702; Referee: Jonathan Benkenstein Pinheiro (Rio Grande do Sul)

30 April 2025	**Paysandu**	**0–1**	**Bahia**	Belém
21:30		Report	Cauly 42' (pen.)	Stadium: Mangueirão; Attendance: 17,029; Referee: Bruno Arleu de Araujo (Rio de Janeiro)

30 April 2025	**Botafogo**	**4–0**	**Capital**	Rio de Janeiro
19:00	Alex Telles 11' (pen.); Igor Jesus 72' (pen.); Artur 75'; Rwan 90'	Report		Stadium: Nilton Santos; Attendance: 8,847; Referee: Lucas Casagrande (Paraná)

29 April 2025	**Internacional**	**1–0**	**Maracanã**	Porto Alegre
19:00 UTC−3	Gustavo Prado 90+2'	Report		Stadium: Beira-Rio; Attendance: 16,145; Referee: Bruno Pereira Vasconcelos (Bahia)

29 April 2025	**Retrô**	**1–1**	**Fortaleza**	São Lourenço da Mata
19:00	Franco 32'	Report	Lucero 88'	Stadium: Arena Pernambuco; Attendance: 2,385; Referee: Gustavo Sampaio Octaviano de Souza (Pernambuco)

1 May 2025	**Brusque**	**0–0**	**Athletico Paranaense**	Joinville
16:00		Report		Stadium: Arena Joinville; Attendance: 6,158; Referee: Edina Alves Batista (São Paulo)

30 April 2025	**Ceará**	**0–1**	**Palmeiras**	Fortaleza
19:30		Report	Gómez 34'	Stadium: Castelão; Attendance: 44,079; Referee: Rodrigo José Pereira de Lima (Pernambuco)

29 April 2025	**Maringá**	**2–2**	**Atlético Mineiro**	Maringá
19:30 UTC−3	Maranhão 16'; Vera 50' (o.g.)	Report	Igor Rabello 43'; Hulk 70'	Stadium: Willie Davids; Attendance: 10,341; Referee: Denis da Silva Ribeiro Serafim (Alagoas)

1 May 2025	**Botafogo-PB**	**0–1**	**Flamengo**	São Luís
20:00		Report	Joshua 85'	Stadium: Castelão; Attendance: 35,381; Referee: João Vitor Gobi (São Paulo)

29 April 2025	**São Paulo**	**2–1**	**Náutico**	São Paulo
21:30 UTC−3	Luciano 21', 46'	Report	Caio Vitor 16'	Stadium: Morumbi; Attendance: 29,291; Referee: Sávio Sampaio (Distrito Federal)

1 May 2025	**Cruzeiro**	**2–0**	**Vila Nova**	Belo Horizonte
21:30	Kaio Jorge 33', 36'	Report		Stadium: Mineirão; Attendance: 27,772; Referee: Raphael Claus (São Paulo)

1 May 2025	**Santos**	**1–1**	**CRB**	Santos
18:00	Rollheiser 45'	Report	Breno 57'	Stadium: Vila Belmiro; Attendance: 10,350; Referee: Lucas Paulo Torezin (Paraná)

30 April 2025	**Novorizontino**	**0–1**	**Corinthians**	Novo Horizonte
21:30		Report	Hernández 12'	Stadium: Jorge Ismael de Biasi; Attendance: 7,521; Referee: Wilton Sampaio (Goiás)

1 May 2025	**Criciúma**	**1–0**	**Red Bull Bragantino**	Criciúma
18:30	Matheus Trindade 54'	Report		Stadium: Heriberto Hülse; Attendance: 11,606; Referee: Felipe Fernandes de Lima (Minas Gerais)

30 April 2025	**CSA**	**3–2**	**Grêmio**	Maceió
21:30	Tiago Marques 14'; Marcelinho 86'; Brayann 90+1'	Report	Braithwaite 23'; Dodi 79'	Stadium: Rei Pelé; Attendance: 9,739; Referee: Paulo César Zanovelli da Silva (Minas Gerais)

==== Second leg ====
20 May 2025	**Vasco da Gama**	**1–1** (**2–2** agg.) (**7–6** p)	Operário Ferroviário	Rio de Janeiro
19:00	Rayan 42'	Report	Ademilson 90+2'	Stadium: São Januário; Attendance: 17,499; Referee: Sávio Sampaio (Distrito Federal)
	**Penalties**
	Vegetti (penalty scored); Tchê Tchê (penalty scored); Lucas Piton (penalty scored); João Victor (penalty missed); Mateus Carvalho (penalty scored); Adson (penalty scored); Hugo Moura (penalty scored); Paulo Henrique (penalty missed); Loide Augusto (penalty scored)		(penalty scored) Allano; (penalty missed) Neto Paraíba; (penalty scored) Gabriel Boschilia; (penalty scored) Rodrigo; (penalty scored) Ademilson; (penalty scored) Índio; (penalty scored) Cristiano; (penalty missed) Thales; (penalty missed) Allan

21 May 2025	Aparecidense	**1–4** (**1–5** agg.)	**Fluminense**	Brasília
19:30	Wellington Carvalho 31'	Report	Samuel Xavier 41'; Everaldo 45+2'; Vanderley 64' (o.g.); Ganso 71'	Stadium: Mané Garrincha; Attendance: 10,113; Referee: Felipe Fernandes de Lima (Minas Gerais)

21 May 2025	**Bahia**	**4–0** (**5–0** agg.)	Paysandu	Salvador
19:30	Michel Araújo 2'; Willian José 32', 45+2'; Rodrigo Nestor 65'	Report		Stadium: Arena Fonte Nova; Attendance: 30,403; Referee: João Vitor Gobi (São Paulo)

22 May 2025	Capital	**1–0** (**1–4** agg.)	**Botafogo**	Brasília
21:30	Rodriguinho 30'	Report		Stadium: Mané Garrincha; Attendance: 14,636; Referee: Bruno Pereira Vasconcelos (Bahia)

22 May 2025	Maracanã	**0–3** (**0–4** agg.)	**Internacional**	Florianópolis
19:00		Report	Alan Patrick 50'; Wesley 73'; Romero 85'	Stadium: Orlando Scarpelli; Attendance: 12,265; Referee: Edina Alves Batista (São Paulo)

21 May 2025	Fortaleza	**1–1** (**2–2** agg.) (**1–4** p)	**Retrô**	Fortaleza
19:00	Breno 56'	Report	Mike 65'	Stadium: Castelão; Attendance: 15,170; Referee: Flávio Rodrigues de Souza (São Paulo)
	**Penalties**
	Lucero (penalty missed); Yago Pikachu (penalty scored); Andrade (penalty missed)		(penalty scored) Bruno Marques; (penalty scored) Júnior Fialho; (penalty scored) Radsley; (penalty scored) Franco

20 May 2025	**Athletico Paranaense**	**1–0** (**1–0** agg.)	Brusque	Curitiba
19:30	Kauã Moraes 1'	Report		Stadium: Arena da Baixada; Attendance: 14,293; Referee: Paulo César Zanovelli da Silva (Minas Gerais)

22 May 2025	**Palmeiras**	**3–0** (**4–0** agg.)	Ceará	São Paulo
19:30	Estêvão 67', 69'; López 86'	Report		Stadium: Allianz Parque; Attendance: 38,598; Referee: Anderson Daronco (Rio Grande do Sul)

21 May 2025	**Atlético Mineiro**	**4–0** (**6–2** agg.)	Maringá	Belo Horizonte
21:30	Rubens 45+3'; Patrick 52'; Rony 77'; Lyanco 88'	Report		Stadium: Arena MRV; Attendance: 19,853; Referee: Bruno Arleu de Araujo (Rio de Janeiro)

21 May 2025	**Flamengo**	**4–2** (**5–2** agg.)	Botafogo-PB	Rio de Janeiro
21:30	Danilo 4'; Pedro 6'; Varela 21'; Everton 48'	Report	Henrique Dourado 35'; Rodrigo Alves 69'	Stadium: Maracanã; Attendance: 25,814; Referee: Lucas Paulo Torezin (Paraná)

20 May 2025	Náutico	**1–2** (**2–4** agg.)	**São Paulo**	Recife
21:30	Hélio 84'	Report	Luciano 3'; Rodriguinho 74'	Stadium: Aflitos; Attendance: 16,832; Referee: Gustavo Sampaio Octaviano de Souza (Pernambuco)

22 May 2025	Vila Nova	**0–3** (**0–5** agg.)	**Cruzeiro**	Goiânia
19:00		Report	Carlos Eduardo 56', 74'; Jonathan 86'	Stadium: Serra Dourada; Attendance: 14,749; Referee: Gustavo Ervino Bauermann (Santa Catarina)

22 May 2025	**CRB**	**0–0** (**1–1** agg.) (**5–4** p)	Santos	Maceió
21:30		Report		Stadium: Rei Pelé; Attendance: 15,174; Referee: Ramon Abatti (Santa Catarina)
	**Penalties**
	Higor Meritão (penalty scored); Fernando Henrique (penalty missed); Matheus Ribeiro (penalty scored); Segovia (penalty scored); Henri (penalty scored); Weverton (penalty scored)		(penalty scored) Neymar; (penalty missed) Guilherme; (penalty scored) Rincón; (penalty scored) Tiquinho; (penalty scored) Gabriel Bontempo; (penalty missed) Zé Ivaldo

21 May 2025	**Corinthians**	**1–0** (**2–0** agg.)	Novorizontino	São Paulo
21:30	Yuri Alberto 90+2'	Report		Stadium: Arena Corinthians; Attendance: 40,505; Referee: Davi de Oliveira Lacerda (Espírito Santo)

22 May 2025	**Red Bull Bragantino**	**6–0** (**6–1** agg.)	Criciúma	Bragança Paulista
21:30	Eduardo Sasha 8' (pen.); Lucas Barbosa 21' (pen.), 52', 67'; Borbas 61', 87'	Report		Stadium: Cícero de Souza Marques; Attendance: 3,588; Referee: Wilton Sampaio (Goiás)

20 May 2025	Grêmio	**0–0** (**2–3** agg.)	**CSA**	Porto Alegre
21:30		Report		Stadium: Arena do Grêmio; Attendance: 12,961; Referee: Matheus Delgado Candançan (São Paulo)

=== Round of 16 ===
The draw for the round of 16 were held on 2 June 2025 at the CBF headquarters in Rio de Janeiro. The 16 teams qualified from the previous round was placed into a single pot and then drawn into eight ties. The winning teams will advance to the quarter-finals.

==== Draw ====
Each CBF team's ranking is shown in parentheses.

Single pot
- Flamengo (1)
- São Paulo (2)
- Palmeiras (3)
- Corinthians (4)
- Atlético Mineiro (5)
- Athletico Paranaense (6)
- Fluminense (7)
- Botafogo (8)
- Bahia (11)
- Internacional (12)
- Red Bull Bragantino (14)
- Vasco da Gama (15)
- Cruzeiro (19)
- CRB (27)
- CSA (42)
- Retrô (63)

==== Matches ====
The round of 16 pairings are:

Team 1	Agg.	Team 2	1st leg	2nd leg
São Paulo	2–2 (0–3 p)	**Athletico Paranaense**	2–1	0–1
Flamengo	1–1 (3–4 p)	**Atlético Mineiro**	0–1	1–0
**Bahia**	3–2	Retrô	3–2	0–0
Internacional	2–3	**Fluminense**	1–2	1–1
**Cruzeiro**	2–0	CRB	0–0	2–0
CSA	1–3	**Vasco da Gama**	0–0	1–3
**Corinthians**	3–0	Palmeiras	1–0	2–0
**Botafogo**	3–0	Red Bull Bragantino	2–0	1–0

==== First leg ====
31 July 2025	**São Paulo**	**2–1**	**Athletico Paranaense**	São Paulo
19:30	Pablo Maia 30'; Ferreira 76'	Report	Viveros 86'	Stadium: Morumbi; Attendance: 42,012; Referee: Ramon Abatti (Santa Catarina)

31 July 2025	**Flamengo**	**0–1**	**Atlético Mineiro**	Rio de Janeiro
21:30		Report	Cuello 65'	Stadium: Maracanã; Attendance: 64,681; Referee: Raphael Claus (São Paulo)

30 July 2025	**Bahia**	**3–2**	**Retrô**	Salvador
19:30	Rodríguez 18', 19'; Willian José 79'	Report	Diego Guerra 31'; Mascote 86'	Stadium: Arena Fonte Nova; Attendance: 29,308; Referee: Flávio Rodrigues de Souza (São Paulo)

30 July 2025	**Internacional**	**1–2**	**Fluminense**	Porto Alegre
21:30	Carbonero 34'	Report	Everaldo 10', 40'	Stadium: Beira-Rio; Attendance: 34,948; Referee: Rodrigo José Pereira de Lima (Pernambuco)

30 July 2025	**Cruzeiro**	**0–0**	**CRB**	Belo Horizonte
19:30		Report		Stadium: Mineirão; Attendance: 33,068; Referee: Edina Alves Batista (São Paulo)

30 July 2025	**CSA**	**0–0**	**Vasco da Gama**	Maceió
19:00		Report		Stadium: Rei Pelé; Attendance: 15,187; Referee: Rafael Rodrigo Klein (Rio Grande do Sul)

30 July 2025	**Corinthians**	**1–0**	**Palmeiras**	São Paulo
21:30	Depay 78'	Report		Stadium: Arena Corinthians; Attendance: 45,527; Referee: Wilton Sampaio (Goiás)

29 July 2025	**Botafogo**	**2–0**	**Red Bull Bragantino**	Rio de Janeiro
19:00	Montoro 16'; Barboza 31'	Report		Stadium: Nilton Santos; Attendance: 26,656; Referee: Anderson Daronco (Rio Grande do Sul)

==== Second leg ====
6 August 2025	**Athletico Paranaense**	**1–0** (**2–2** agg.) (**3–0** p)	São Paulo	Curitiba
19:30	Esquivel 68'	Report		Stadium: Arena da Baixada; Attendance: 30,078; Referee: Felipe Fernandes de Lima (Minas Gerais)
	**Penalties**
	Giuliano (penalty scored); Esquivel (penalty scored); Mendoza (penalty scored)		(penalty missed) Sabino; (penalty missed) Tapia; (penalty missed) Jandrei

6 August 2025	**Atlético Mineiro**	**0–1** (**1–1** agg.) (**4–3** p)	Flamengo	Belo Horizonte
19:00		Report	Everton 20'	Stadium: Arena MRV; Attendance: 38,873; Referee: Rafael Rodrigo Klein (Rio Grande do Sul)
	**Penalties**
	Hulk (penalty scored); Gustavo Scarpa (penalty scored); Alonso (penalty missed); Igor Gomes (penalty scored); Everson (penalty scored)		(penalty scored) De Arrascaeta; (penalty scored) Jorginho; (penalty scored) Saúl; (penalty missed) Samuel Lino; (penalty missed) Wallace Yan

6 August 2025	Retrô	**0–0** (**2–3** agg.)	**Bahia**	São Lourenço da Mata
19:30		Report		Stadium: Arena Pernambuco; Attendance: 2,913; Referee: Matheus Delgado Candançan (São Paulo)

6 August 2025	**Fluminense**	**1–1** (**3–2** agg.)	Internacional	Rio de Janeiro
21:30	Canobbio 46'	Report	Alan Patrick 64' (pen.)	Stadium: Maracanã; Attendance: 32,368; Referee: Ramon Abatti (Santa Catarina)

7 August 2025	CRB	**0–2** (**0–2** agg.)	**Cruzeiro**	Maceió
21:00		Report	Villalba 42'; Carlos Eduardo 90+6'	Stadium: Rei Pelé; Attendance: 15,200; Referee: Flávio Rodrigues de Souza (São Paulo)

7 August 2025	**Vasco da Gama**	**3–1** (**3–1** agg.)	CSA	Rio de Janeiro
20:00	Rayan 19'; Coutinho 30'; Tchê Tchê 45'	Report	Brayann 48'	Stadium: São Januário; Attendance: 19,171; Referee: Raphael Claus (São Paulo)

6 August 2025	Palmeiras	**0–2** (**0–3** agg.)	**Corinthians**	São Paulo
21:30		Report	Matheus Bidu 42'; Gustavo Henrique 57'	Stadium: Allianz Parque; Attendance: 41,466; Referee: Anderson Daronco (Rio Grande do Sul)

6 August 2025	Red Bull Bragantino	**0–1** (**0–3** agg.)	**Botafogo**	Bragança Paulista
19:00		Report	Savarino 54'	Stadium: Cícero de Souza Marques; Attendance: 3,876; Referee: Rodrigo José Pereira de Lima (Pernambuco)

== Final rounds ==
The draw for the quarter-finals was held on 12 August 2025 at the CBF headquarters in Rio de Janeiro. The last 8 teams qualified from the round of 16 was placed into a single pot and then drawn until the finals, also played on a home-and-away two-legged basis.

=== Draw ===
Each CBF team's ranking is shown in parentheses.

Single pot
- Corinthians (4)
- Atlético Mineiro (5)
- Athletico Paranaense (6)
- Fluminense (7)
- Botafogo (8)
- Bahia (11)
- Vasco da Gama (15)
- Cruzeiro (19)

=== Bracket ===
Quarter-finals
(Minas Gerais) Atlético Mineiro	0	0	0
(Minas Gerais) Cruzeiro	2	2	4
(Paraná (state)) Athletico Paranaense	0	0	0
(São Paulo (state)) Corinthians	1	2	3
(Rio de Janeiro (state)) Vasco da Gama (p)	1	1	2 (5)
(Rio de Janeiro (state)) Botafogo	1	1	2 (3)
Bahia	1	0	1
(Rio de Janeiro (state)) Fluminense	0	2	2

Semi-finals
(Minas Gerais) Cruzeiro	0	2	2 (4)
(São Paulo (state)) Corinthians (p)	1	1	2 (5)
(Rio de Janeiro (state)) Vasco da Gama (p)	2	0	2 (4)
(Rio de Janeiro (state)) Fluminense	1	1	2 (3)

Finals
(São Paulo (state)) Corinthians	0	2	2
(Rio de Janeiro (state)) Vasco da Gama	0	1	1

=== Quarter-finals ===
==== First leg ====
27 August 2025	Atlético Mineiro	0–2	Cruzeiro	Belo Horizonte
19:30		Report	Fabrício Bruno 50'; Kaio Jorge 64'	Stadium: Arena MRV; Attendance: 44,286; Referee: Ramon Abatti (Santa Catarina)

27 August 2025	Athletico Paranaense	0–1	Corinthians	Curitiba
21:30		Report	Gui Negão 58'	Stadium: Arena da Baixada; Attendance: 39,280; Referee: Wilton Sampaio (Goiás)

27 August 2025	Vasco da Gama	1–1	Botafogo	Rio de Janeiro
21:30	Jair 17'	Report	Arthur Cabral 8'	Stadium: São Januário; Attendance: 20,358; Referee: Anderson Daronco (Rio Grande do Sul)

28 August 2025	Bahia	1–0	Fluminense	Salvador
19:30	Luciano Juba 85'	Report		Stadium: Arena Fonte Nova; Attendance: 43,276; Referee: Raphael Claus (São Paulo)

==== Second leg ====
11 September 2025	Cruzeiro	2–0 (4–0 agg.)	Atlético Mineiro	Belo Horizonte
19:30	Kaio Jorge 4', 47'	Report		Stadium: Mineirão; Attendance: 61,584; Referee: Rafael Rodrigo Klein (Rio Grande do Sul)

10 September 2025	Corinthians	2–0 (3–0 agg.)	Athletico Paranaense	São Paulo
21:30	Garro 43'; Gui Negão 63'	Report		Stadium: Arena Corinthians; Attendance: 41,450; Referee: Davi de Oliveira Lacerda (Espírito Santo)

11 September 2025	Botafogo	1–1 (2–2 agg.) (3–5 p)	Vasco da Gama	Rio de Janeiro
21:30	Alex Telles 42' (pen.)	Report	Nuno Moreira 20'	Stadium: Nilton Santos; Attendance: 40,649; Referee: Rodrigo José Pereira de Lima (Pernambuco)
	Penalties
	Alex Telles (penalty missed); Marlon Freitas (penalty scored); Matheus Martins (penalty scored); Savarino (penalty scored)		(penalty scored) Vegetti; (penalty scored) Rayan; (penalty scored) Rodríguez; (penalty scored) Matheus França; (penalty scored) Robert Renan

10 September 2025	Fluminense	2–0 (2–1 agg.)	Bahia	Rio de Janeiro
19:00	Canobbio 54' (pen.); Thiago Silva 84'	Report		Stadium: Maracanã; Attendance: 48,669; Referee: Matheus Delgado Candançan (São Paulo)

=== Semi-finals ===
The order of legs for the semi-finals was decided in a draw held on 22 October 2025 at the CBF headquarters in Rio de Janeiro.

==== First leg ====
10 December 2025	Cruzeiro	0–1	Corinthians	Belo Horizonte
21:30		Report	Depay 21'	Stadium: Mineirão; Attendance: 59,052; Referee: Anderson Daronco (Rio Grande do Sul)

11 December 2025	Vasco da Gama	2–1	Fluminense	Rio de Janeiro
20:00	Rayan 49'; Vegetti 90+4'	Report	Serna 22'	Stadium: Maracanã; Attendance: 64,990; Referee: Raphael Claus (São Paulo)

==== Second leg ====
14 December 2025	Corinthians	1–2 (2–2 agg.) (5–4 p)	Cruzeiro	São Paulo
18:00	Bidu 54'	Report	Arroyo 39', 49'	Stadium: Arena Corinthians; Attendance: 46,946; Referee: Rodrigo José Pereira de Lima (Pernambuco)
	Penalties
	Yuri Alberto (penalty missed); Depay (penalty scored); Garro (penalty scored); Vitinho (penalty scored); Gustavo Henrique (penalty scored); Breno Bidon (penalty scored)		(penalty scored) Matheus Pereira; (penalty scored) Wanderson; (penalty scored) William; (penalty scored) Lucas Silva; (penalty missed) Gabriel; (penalty missed) Walace

14 December 2025	Fluminense	1–0 (2–2 agg.) (3–4 p)	Vasco da Gama	Rio de Janeiro
20:30	Paulo Henrique 35' (o.g.)	Report		Stadium: Maracanã; Attendance: 67,560; Referee: Wilton Sampaio (Goiás)
	Penalties
	Thiago Silva (penalty scored); John Kennedy (penalty missed); Ganso (penalty scored); Renê (penalty scored); Canobbio (penalty missed)		(penalty missed) Vegetti; (penalty scored) Rayan; (penalty scored) Victor Luis; (penalty scored) Coutinho; (penalty scored) Rodríguez

=== Finals ===
The order of legs for the finals was decided in a draw held on 22 October 2025 at the CBF headquarters in Rio de Janeiro.

==== First leg ====
17 December 2025	Corinthians	0–0	Vasco da Gama	São Paulo
21:30		Report		Stadium: Arena Corinthians; Attendance: 46,616; Referee: Rafael Rodrigo Klein (Rio Grande do Sul)

==== Second leg ====
21 December 2025	Vasco da Gama	1–2	Corinthians	Rio de Janeiro
18:00	Nuno Moreira 41'	Report	Yuri Alberto 18'; Depay 62'	Stadium: Maracanã; Attendance: 67,111; Referee: Wilton Sampaio (Goiás)

Copa do Brasil
2025 champions

4th title

== Top scorers ==
Rank	Player	Club	Goals
1	(Brazil) Kaio Jorge	Cruzeiro	5
1	(Brazil) Rayan	Vasco da Gama	5
3	(Argentina) Germán Cano	Fluminense	4
3	(Brazil) Everaldo	Fluminense	4
3	(Brazil) Luiz Fernando	Athletico Paranaense	4
