= Santo Antônio do Monte =

- Municipality

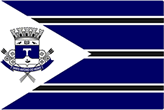
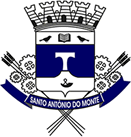
- Flag Coat of arms

- Location in Minas Gerais state

- Location in Brazil
- Coordinates: 20°05′13″S 45°37′38″W
- Country: Brazil
- Region: Southeast
- State: Minas Gerais

Area
  - Total: 1,125.78 km^{2} (434.67 sq mi)

Population (2022 Census)
  - Total: 27,295
  - Estimate (2025): 28,456
  - Density: 24.245/km^{2} (62.795/sq mi)
- Time zone: UTC−3 (BRT)

Santo Antônio do Monte (Portuguese, St. Antony of the Hill) is a municipality in the central part of the state of Minas Gerais, Brazil. The population is 28,456 (2025 est.) in an area of 1,125.78 km^{2} (434.67 sq mi). The city is located 194 km west of state capital Belo Horizonte. The city is also known as Samonte. Santo Antonio do Monte was founded in the 18th century and it became a municipality on November 16, 1875. The main economic activity of the city is the production of fireworks. Nowadays there are in the city about 70 firework factories.

== Neighboring municipalities ==
- Divinópolis
- Lagoa da Prata
- Formiga
- Pedra do Indaiá
- São Sebastião do Oeste
- Arcos
- Luz
- Bom Despacho
