= Fumaça =

Fumaça (Portuguese, 'smoke') may refer to:

== Brazilian footballers ==
- Fumaça (footballer, born 1976) (José Rodrigues Alves Antunes)
- Fumaça (footballer, born 1985) (Alessandro Pedro Ribeiro)
- Fumaça (footballer, born 1987) (Jonatha Alves da Silva)
- Rodrigo Fumaça (born 1995)
- Diego Fumaça (born 1994)

== Other uses ==
- Fumaça River, in Tocantins state, Brazil

== See also ==
- Smoke
- Maria Fumaça, a 1977 album by Banda Black Rio
- Morro da Fumaça, a Brazilian municipality in the state of Santa Catarina
