= Otávio (footballer, born December 2005) =

Brazilian footballer (born 2005)

Personal information
- Full name: Otávio Eleodoro Rezende Costa
- Date of birth: 27 December 2005 (age 20)
- Place of birth: Perdigão, Brazil
- Height: 1.91 m (6 ft 3 in)
- Position: Goalkeeper

Team information
- Current team: Cruzeiro
- Number: 81

Youth career
- 2016–2025: Cruzeiro

Senior career*
Years	Team	Apps	(Gls)
2025–	Cruzeiro	16	(0)

International career^{‡}
2025	Brazil U20	5	(0)
2026–	Brazil	1	(0)
- * Club domestic league appearances and goals as of 19:53, 9 September 2026 (UTC) ‡ National team caps and goals as of 29 September 2026

Otávio Eleodoro Rezende Costa (born 27 December 2005), simply known as Otávio, is a Brazilian footballer who plays as a goalkeeper for Cruzeiro and the Brazil national team.

== Club career ==
Born in Perdigão, Minas Gerais, Otávio joined Cruzeiro's youth sides at the age of ten, in 2016. He signed his first professional contract with the club in April 2022, agreeing to a three-year deal, and further extended his link with the club until December 2028 in January 2024.

Otávio was promoted to the first team ahead of the 2025 season, but was mainly a third-choice behind Cássio and Léo Aragão during the year. He remained a third-choice in 2026, behind Cássio and new signing Matheus Cunha, but made his senior debut on 10 January of that year, starting in a 2–1 Campeonato Mineiro home loss to Pouso Alegre.

A backup to Cunha after Cássio suffered an injury, Otávio was made a starter by new head coach Artur Jorge in a Copa do Brasil match against Goiás on 22 April 2026, before also featuring the full 90 minutes in a 1–0 win over Boca Juniors six days later; in the process, he became the youngest Brazilian goalkeeper to feature in a Copa Libertadores match.

== International career ==
In December 2024, Otávio was called up to the Brazil national under-20 team for the 2025 South American U-20 Championship, but was cut from the squad at his club's request. He was a part of the squad in the 2025 FIFA U-20 World Cup, playing in all three matches in the competition.

On 9 September 2026, Otávio was called up to the full side by Carlo Ancelotti for two friendlies against Australia and India. He made his full international debut twenty days later, starting in a 4–2 win over the former.

== Career statistics ==
As of 9 September 2026

Club	Season	League			State League		Cup		Continental		Other		Total	
Club	Season	Division	Apps	Goals	Apps	Goals	Apps	Goals	Apps	Goals	Apps	Goals	Apps	Goals
Cruzeiro	2025	Série A	0	0	0	0	0	0	0	0	—		0	0
Cruzeiro	2026	Série A	13	0	3	0	6	0	6 (Note: Appearance(s) in Copa Libertadores)	0	—		28	0
Career total			13	0	3	0	6	0	6	0	0	0	28	0

=== International ===
As of 29 September 2026

Appearances and goals by national team and year
National team	Year	Apps	Goals
Brazil	2026	1	0
Total		1	0
