= Divinópolis =

- Municipality
- Municipality of Divinópolis
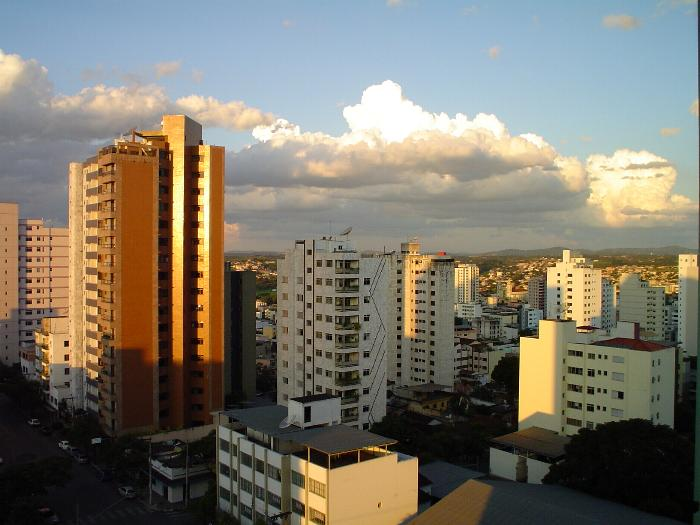

- Flag Coat of arms
- Nickname: Princesa do Oeste (The West Princess)
- Location within Brazil
- Coordinates: 20°08′20″S 44°53′02″W
- Country: Brazil
- Region: Southeast
- State: Minas Gerais

Government
  - Mayor: Gleidson Azevedo (NOVO)

Area
  - Total: 708.909 km^{2} (273.711 sq mi)

Population (2022 Brazilian census)
  - Total: 231,091
  - Estimate (2025): 243.583
  - Density: 325.981/km^{2} (844.287/sq mi)
- Time zone: UTC−3 (BRT)
- HDI (2010): 0.764 – high
- Website: divinopolis.mg.gov.br

Divinópolis is a municipality in the centre-west of Minas Gerais state, Brazil. The estimated population in 2025 was 243,583 inhabitants. The total area of the municipality is 709 km^{2} and the elevation is 712 metres. It is 120 km from state capital Belo Horizonte. Divinópolis is the seat of the Regional Administration of the Upper São Francisco River.

== Geography ==
The city centre of Divinópolis is at an elevation of 712 meters approximately 120 km southwest of Belo Horizonte. Neighbouring municipalities are Nova Serrana (N), São Gonçalo do Pará and Carmo do Cajuru (E), Cláudio and São Sebastião do Oeste (S), Santo Antônio do Monte and Perdigão (W).

The characteristic vegetation of the municipality is cerrado, but there are still some gallery forests along the rivers. The climate is classified as subtropical mesothermic, characterised by dry winters and wet summers. The average temperature in winter is approximately 16 °C and the average of the hottest month is about 25 °C. The period between December and February is the rainiest. The driest months are from April to September. The lowest temperature set was in 1997 with 0.7 °C (33 °F).

Divinópolis is watered by the Pará and Itapecerica rivers. The basin of the Pará is one of the most important of the São Francisco River and crosses 16 municipalities.

Divinópolis is the seat of a diocese that covers 25 municipalities and over 600,000 people.

According to the modern (2017) geographic classification by Brazil's National Institute of Geography and Statistics (IBGE), the city is the main municipality in the Intermediate Geographic Region of Divinópolis.

=== Statistical micro-region ===
Divinópolis is a statistical micro-region including 11 municipalities: Carmo do Cajuru, Cláudio, Conceição do Pará, Divinópolis, Igaratinga, Itaúna, Nova Serrana, Perdigão, Santo Antônio do Monte, São Gonçalo do Pará, and São Sebastião do Oeste. In 2000, the population was 379,122 inhabitants living in an area of 5,105.50 km^{2}.

=== Driving distances ===
- Bom Despacho: 102 km (north on BR-494 then west on BR-262)
- Uberaba: 423 km (north on BR-494 then west on BR-262)
- Formiga: 76 km southwest on MG-050

=== Climate ===
Climate data for Divinópolis (1981–2010)
Month	Jan	Feb	Mar	Apr	May	Jun	Jul	Aug	Sep	Oct	Nov	Dec	Year
Mean daily maximum °C (°F)	30.1 (86.2)	30.7 (87.3)	30.1 (86.2)	29.4 (84.9)	27.1 (80.8)	26.5 (79.7)	26.8 (80.2)	28.5 (83.3)	29.7 (85.5)	30.4 (86.7)	29.1 (84.4)	29.4 (84.9)	29 (84)
Daily mean °C (°F)	23.8 (74.8)	24.0 (75.2)	23.6 (74.5)	22.2 (72.0)	19.1 (66.4)	17.8 (64.0)	18.0 (64.4)	19.8 (67.6)	21.9 (71.4)	23.4 (74.1)	23.0 (73.4)	23.4 (74.1)	21.7 (71.1)
Mean daily minimum °C (°F)	19.1 (66.4)	18.9 (66.0)	18.5 (65.3)	16.4 (61.5)	12.7 (54.9)	10.7 (51.3)	10.4 (50.7)	11.7 (53.1)	15.0 (59.0)	17.3 (63.1)	18.2 (64.8)	19.0 (66.2)	15.7 (60.3)
Average precipitation mm (inches)	300.2 (11.82)	167.3 (6.59)	157.0 (6.18)	51.2 (2.02)	27.3 (1.07)	13.6 (0.54)	7.9 (0.31)	17.3 (0.68)	52.0 (2.05)	109.7 (4.32)	208.4 (8.20)	296.2 (11.66)	1,408.1 (55.44)
Average precipitation days (≥ 1.0 mm)	16	11	11	5	3	1	1	2	5	8	14	17	94
Average relative humidity (%)	72.9	69.8	72.1	68.8	68.4	66.3	61.0	53.4	56.2	60.1	70.1	74.4	66.1
Mean monthly sunshine hours	174.3	183.9	189.1	218.9	217.3	210.8	228.1	242.0	197.4	194.7	158.1	148.8	2,363.4
Source: Instituto Nacional de Meteorologia

== History ==
Divinópolis was founded in 1767 by 50 families who lived in the lands near the Itapecerica and Pará rivers. The first settlement took root near the waterfalls on the Itapecerica and was called Paragem da Itapecerica in reference to the river. In 1770 it became Espírito Santo da Itapecerica and was a district of Tamanduá. In 1912 it became a city with the name Divinópolis (City of the Holy Spirit) in homage to the older name of Espírito Santo.

The arrival of the Estrada de Ferro Oeste de Minas (a narrow gauge railroad) in 1890 offered the city opportunities for the installation of industries of iron and steel, providing a reasonable standard of living, as well as a high level of social development.

== Economy ==
The main economic activities are services, industry, and agriculture. The GDP in 2005 was approximately 2 billion reais, with 244 million reais coming from taxes, 1,215,000 reais from services, 603,000 reais from industry, and 45,000 reais from agriculture. In 2005 there were 1,947 transformation industries employing 16,687 people and 4,526 retail units employing 16,559 people. Public administration employed 3,972 people and health services employed 2,434 people.

In the rural area there were 942 farms on 31,000 hectares (2006). 1,200 people were engaged in the agricultural sector. The main crops were citrus fruits, rice, beans, and corn. There were 43,000 head of cattle, of which 10,000 were dairy cattle.

At the end of the 1970s the economic problems of the steel industry caused factories to close and many workers to be laid off. The difficulties forced the appearance of clothing factories, which were an important economic alternative. In addition to clothing, the city produces beverages, dairy products, and meat products.

== Transport ==
Divinópolis has the Brigadeiro Cabral Airport.

== Health and education ==
In the health sector there were 94 establishments, of which 36 were public and 56 were private (2005). There were 36 specialized health clinics and 4 hospitals with 593 beds. (2005). Patients with more serious health conditions are transported to Belo Horizonte.

Education needs of 44,000 students were met by 93 primary schools, 32 middle schools, and 92 pre-primary schools.

There are five institutions that provide higher education: Instituto Superior de Educação de Divinópolis (ISED), Faculdade de Arte e Design (FAD), Faculdade de Ciências Econômicas e Administrativas de Divinópolis (FACED), Instituto de Ensino Superior e Pesquisa (INESP), and Faculdades Integradas do Oeste de Minas (FADOM). There is a satellite campus of the Federal University of São João del-Rei (UFSJ), which goes by the name of "Dona Lindu", in homage to president Lula's mother.

- Municipal Human Development Index: 0.831 (2000)
- State ranking: 5 out of 853 municipalities as of 2000
- National ranking: 132 out of 5,138 municipalities as of 2000
- Literacy rate: 94%
- Life expectancy: 75 (average of males and females)

In 2000 the per capita monthly income of R$327.00 was above the state average of R$276.00 and the national average of R$297.00. Poços de Caldas had the highest per capita monthly income in 2000 with R$435.00. The lowest was Setubinha with R$73.00.

The highest ranking municipality in Minas Gerais in 2000 was Poços de Caldas with 0.841, while the lowest was Setubinha with 0.568. Nationally the highest was São Caetano do Sul in São Paulo with 0.919, while the lowest was Setubinha. In more recent statistics (considering 5,507 municipalities) Manari in the state of Pernambuco has the lowest rating in the country—0,467—putting it in last place.

== Notable people ==
- Ricardo Nunes, founder of Ricardo Eletro, one of the largest Brazilian retail chains specializing in household appliances, was born in Divinópolis in 1970
- Adélia Prado, writer and poet (1935–), has lived in Divinópolis her entire life
- Luma Russo – Brazilian beauty pageant titleholder
- The footballer Emerson Aparecido Vivas Vergílio, or simply Emerson was born in Divinópolis on May 28, 1982

== See also ==
- List of municipalities in Minas Gerais
