= Córrego Fundo =

- City
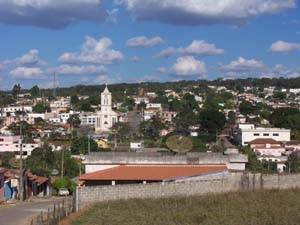

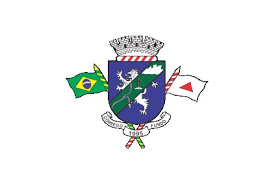
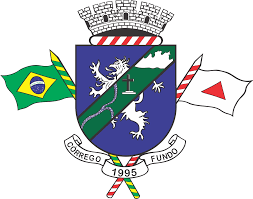
- Flag Coat of arms

- Location of Córrego Fundo on a map of the state of Minas Gerais
- Coordinates: 20°26′56″S 45°33′18″W
- Country: Brazil
- Region: Southeast
- State: Minas Gerais
- Mesoregion: West of Minas Gerais
- Microregion: Formiga
- Incorporated: October 23rd, 1995

Government
  - Mayor: Erica Maria Leão Costa (PSDC)

Area
  - Total: 40,690 sq mi (105,387 km^{2})
- Elevation: 2,769 ft (844 m)

Population (2022 Census)
  - Total: 6,133
  - Estimate (2025): 6,333
- Time zone: UTC−3 (BRT)
- HDI (2013): 0.678
- Website: Official Website

Córrego Fundo is a Brazilian municipality located in the center of the state of Minas Gerais. Its population as of 2025 was 6,333 people living in a total area of 101 km^{2}. The city belongs to the meso-region of Oeste de Minas and to the micro-region of Formiga. It became a municipality in 1995.

== Geography ==
The city center of Córrego Fundo is located at an elevation of 844 meters a short distance west of Formiga. It is connected to Formiga, Divinópolis, and Belo Horizonte by highway MG-050. Neighboring municipalities are: Arcos (N and NW), Formiga (E and S), and Pains (W).

Distances to other cities

- Belo Horizonte/MG - 200 km
- Formiga/MG - 8 km
- Piumhi/MG - 50 km
- Divinópolis/MG - 83 km

== Economic activities ==
Services and industry are the most important economic activities. In 2005 there were 16 extractive industries (mining) and 143 transformation industries. Transformation industries employed 701 workers. The GDP in 2005 was approximately R$66 million, 8 million reais from taxes, 23 million reais from services, 30 million reais from industry, and 4 million reais from agriculture. There were 414 rural producers on 5,000 hectares of land (2006). 24 farms had tractors (2006). Approximately 900 persons were involved in agriculture. The main crops are coffee, rice, beans, and corn. There were 4,000 head of cattle (2006).

There were no banks (2007). The motor vehicle fleet had 848 automobiles, 279 trucks, 66 pickup trucks, and 269 motorcycles.

== Health and education ==
In the health sector there were 2 public health clinics (2005). Patients with more serious health conditions are transported to Formiga or Divinópolis. Educational needs of 1,000 students were met by 3 primary schools, 1 middle school, and 2 pre-primary schools.

- Municipal Human Development Index: 0.678 (2010)
- National ranking: 2481 out of 5,565 municipalities as of 2010
- Literacy rate: 88%
- Life expectancy: 70 (average of males and females)

In 2000 the per capita monthly income of R$169.00 was well below the state and national average of R$276.00 and R$297.00 respectively. Poços de Caldas had the highest per capita monthly income in 2000 with R$435.00. The lowest was Setubinha with R$73.00.

The highest ranking municipality in Minas Gerais in 2000 was Poços de Caldas with 0.841, while the lowest was Setubinha with 0.568. Nationally the highest was São Caetano do Sul in São Paulo with 0.919, while the lowest was Setubinha. In more recent statistics (considering 5,507 municipalities) Manari in the state of Pernambuco has the lowest rating in the country—0,467—putting it in last place.

== See also ==
- List of municipalities in Minas Gerais
