= Perdigão =

Perdigão may refer to:

- Perdigão, Minas Gerais, a municipality in the state of Minas Gerais in the Southeast region of Brazil
- Perdigão S.A., a Brazilian foods company
- Perdigão (footballer, born 1977), born Cleilton Eduardo Vicente, Brazilian football defensive midfielder
- Perdigão (footballer, born 1991), born Jeferson Fernandes Macedo, Brazilian football winger
