= Arcos, Minas Gerais =

Town and municipality in the state of Minas Gerais, Brazil

Coordinates: 20°17′29″S 45°32′23″W

- Municipality
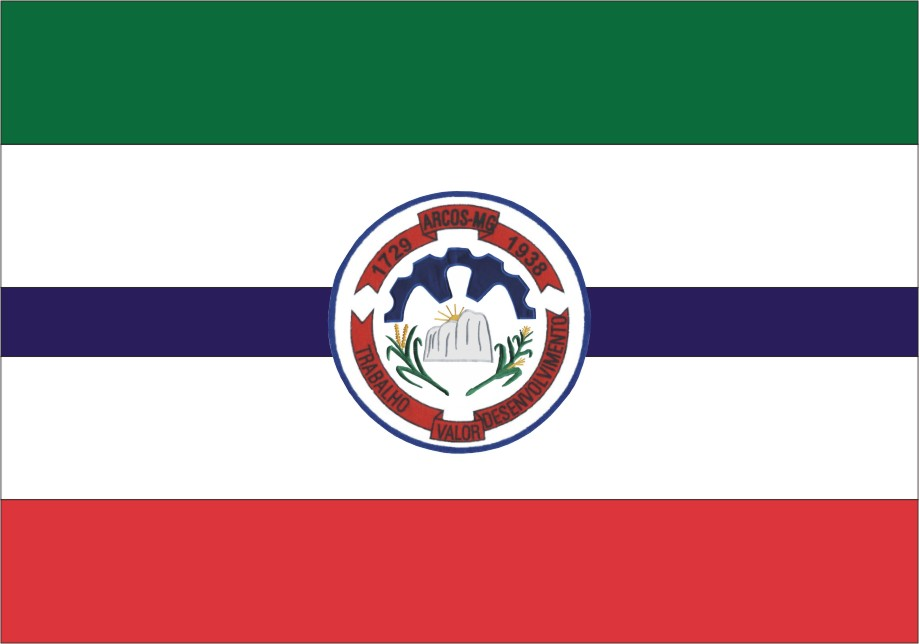
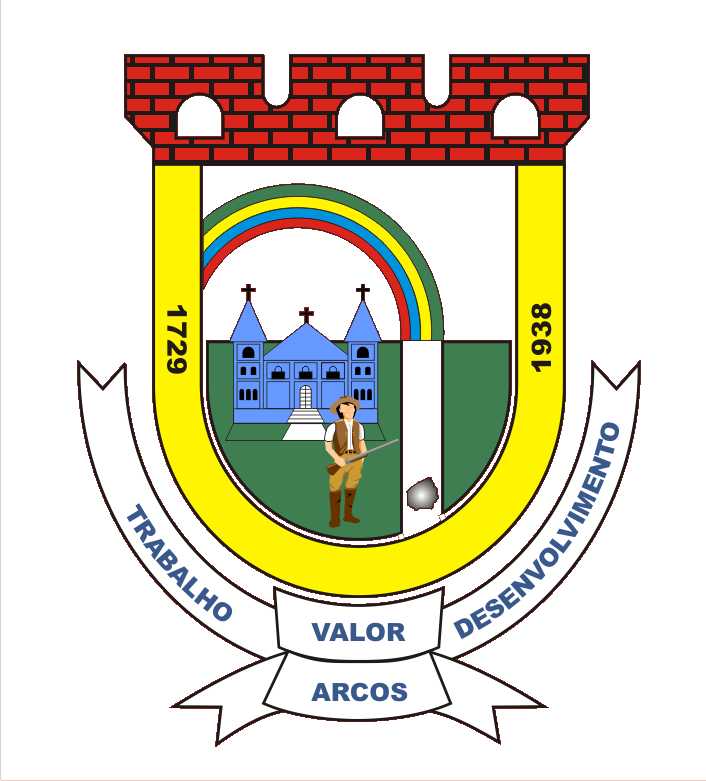
- Flag Coat of arms
- Interactive map of Arcos, Minas Gerais
- Country: Brazil
- State: Minas Gerais
- Region: Southeast

Population (2022 Census)
  - Total: 41,416
  - Estimate (2025): 43,653
- Time zone: UTC−3 (BRT)

Location of Arcos on a map of the state of Minas Gerais

Arcos is a Brazilian municipality located in the center of the state of Minas Gerais. Its population as of 2025 was 43,653 people living in a total area of 509 km^{2}. The city belongs to the meso-region of Oeste de Minas and to the micro-region of Formiga. It became a municipality in 1938.

== Geography ==
The city center of Arcos is located at an elevation of 740 meters just off state highway BR-354. Neighboring municipalities are: Lagoa da Prata (N), Santo Antônio do Monte (NE), Formiga (SE), Córrego Fundo (S), Pains (SW), and Iguatama (NW).

Distances to other cities

- Belo Horizonte/MG - 210 km
- Formiga/MG - 32 km
- Japaraíba/MG - 39 km
- Divinópolis/MG - 95 km

== Origin of the name ==
There are several explanations for the name of the city, but the most accepted is the theory that rims ("arcos" or "aros" in Portuguese) of barrels were left on the bank of the stream that crosses the region to mark the trail for cattle heading west to the Triângulo Mineiro. The pioneers knew of the place along the stream where the barrel rims could be found. Little by little the place became known as "Córrego dos Arcos", Stream of the Barrel Rims. However the city only received the name in 1833. Before it had been called São Julião. Today this name belongs to a rural community of the municipality which has the chapel of São Julião.

== Economy ==
Services, mining, light industry, and agriculture are the most important economic activities. In 2005 there were 239 units of transformation industries and 935 units of commerce, vehicle repair, personal and domestic articles. There are large reserves of limestone and many workers are employed in the mining and the transformation of the product. The GDP in 2005 was approximately R$342 million, R$37 million from taxes, 157 million reais from services, 127 million reais from industry, and 20 million reais from agriculture. There were 892 rural producers on 26,000 hectares of land (2006). 125 farms had tractors (2006). Approximately 2,000 persons were involved in agriculture. The main crops are rice, beans, and corn. There were 26,000 head of cattle (2006).

There were 4 banks (2007). The motor vehicle fleet had 7,708 automobiles, 886 trucks, 736 pickup trucks, and 3,0820 motorcycles.

Working population by sector

- Transformation industries: 2,389 workers
- Commerce: 2,509 workers
- Lodging and restaurants: 222 workers
- Transport, storage, communications: 702 workers
- Public administration: 752 workers
- Health and social services: 168 workers

== Health and education ==
In the health sector there were 9 public health clinics (2005) and 1 hospital with 87 beds. Patients with more serious health conditions are transported to Formiga or Belo Horizonte. Educational needs of 7,200 students were met by 10 primary schools, 8 middle schools, and 13 pre-primary schools.

- Municipal Human Development Index: 0.808 (2000)
- State ranking: 26 out of 853 municipalities as of 2000
- National ranking: 414 out of 5,138 municipalities as of 2000
- Literacy rate: 92%
- Life expectancy: 74 (average of males and females)

In 2000 the per capita monthly income of R$265.00 was below the state and national average of R$276.00 and R$297.00 respectively. Poços de Caldas had the highest per capita monthly income in 2000 with R$435.00. The lowest was Setubinha with R$73.00.

The highest ranking municipality in Minas Gerais in 2000 was Poços de Caldas with 0.841, while the lowest was Setubinha with 0.568. Nationally the highest was São Caetano do Sul in São Paulo with 0.919, while the lowest was Setubinha. In more recent statistics (considering 5,507 municipalities) Manari in the state of Pernambuco has the lowest rating in the country—0,467—putting it in last place.

== See also ==
- List of municipalities in Minas Gerais
