= Camacho, Minas Gerais =

Town and municipality in Minas Gerais, Brazil

Coordinates: 20°37′30″S 45°09′25″W

- Municipality
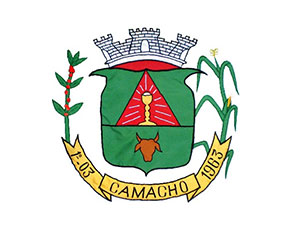
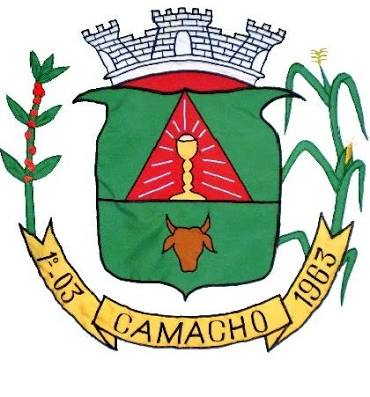
- Flag Coat of arms
- Interactive map of Camacho, Minas Gerais
- Country: Brazil
- State: Minas Gerais
- Region: Southeast

Population (2022 Census)
  - Total: 2,838
  - Estimate (2025): 2,851
- Time zone: UTC−3 (BRT)

Location of Camacho on a map of the state of Minas Gerais

Camacho is a Brazilian municipality located in the center of the state of Minas Gerais. Its population as of 2025 was 2,851 people living in a total area of 223 km^{2} (86 sq mi). The city belongs to the meso-region of Oeste de Minas and to the micro-region of Formiga. It became a municipality in 1962.

== Geography ==
The city center of Camacho is located at an elevation of 957 meters southeast of Formiga. Neighboring municipalities are: Itapecerica (N and NW), Oliveira (E), and Candeias (S and W).

Distances to other cities

- Belo Horizonte/MG - 212 km
- Formiga/MG - 70 km
- Candeias/MG - 28 km
- Itapecerica/MG - 22 km

== Economy ==
Services and agriculture are the most important economic activities. The GDP in 2005 was approximately R$28 million, 9 million reais from services and 17 million reais from agriculture. There were 546 rural producers on 15,000 hectares of land (2006). 42 farms had tractors (2006). Approximately 1,800 persons were involved in agriculture. The main crops are coffee, rice, beans, and corn. There were 6,000 head of cattle (2006).

There were no banks (2007). The motor vehicle fleet had 299 automobiles, 51 trucks, 35 pickup trucks, and 245 motorcycles.

== Health and education ==
In the health sector there were 2 public health clinics (2005). Patients with more serious health conditions are transported to Formiga or Belo Horizonte. Educational needs of 700 students were met by 4 primary schools, 1 middle school, and 1 pre-primary school.

- Municipal Human Development Index: 0.698 (2000)
- State ranking: 554 out of 853 municipalities as of 2000
- National ranking: 3026 out of 5,138 municipalities as of 2000
- Literacy rate: 78%
- Life expectancy: 70 (average of males and females)

In 2000 the per capita monthly income of R$121.00 was well below the state and national average of R$276.00 and R$297.00 respectively. Poços de Caldas had the highest per capita monthly income in 2000 with R$435.00. The lowest was Setubinha with R$73.00.

The highest ranking municipality in Minas Gerais in 2000 was Poços de Caldas with 0.841, while the lowest was Setubinha with 0.568. Nationally the highest was São Caetano do Sul in São Paulo with 0.919, while the lowest was Setubinha. In more recent statistics (considering 5,507 municipalities) Manari in the state of Pernambuco has the lowest rating in the country—0,467—putting it in last place.

== See also ==
- List of municipalities in Minas Gerais
