= Emerson (footballer, born May 1982) =

Brazilian footballer

Personal information
- Full name: Emerson Aparecido Vivas Vergílio
- Date of birth: May 28, 1982 (age 44)
- Place of birth: Divinópolis, Brazil
- Height: 1.73 m (5 ft 8 in)
- Position: Defensive midfielder

Youth career
- 2003: América-MG

Senior career*
Years	Team	Apps	(Gls)
2004	Cruzeiro		
2005	→ Ipatinga (loan)		
2005	Bahia (loan)		
2006–2008	Cruzeiro		
2007–2008	→ Villa Nova-MG (loan)		
2009–2010	Villa Nova-MG		
2011	Guarani-MG		
2011	América-RN		
- * Club domestic league appearances and goals

Emerson Aparecido Vivas Vergílio, or simply Emerson (born May 28, 1982 in Divinópolis), is a Brazilian defensive midfielder.

== Honours ==
- Minas Gerais State League: 2005, 2006

== Contract ==
- Villa Nova (Loan) 1 January 2008 to 15 May 2008
- Cruzeiro 1 January 2006 to 31 December 2008
