= Itapecerica =

- Municipality
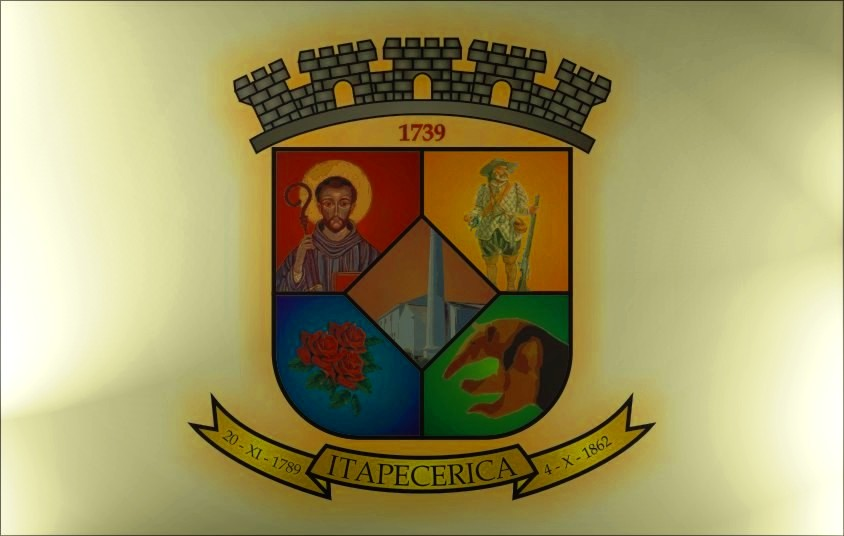
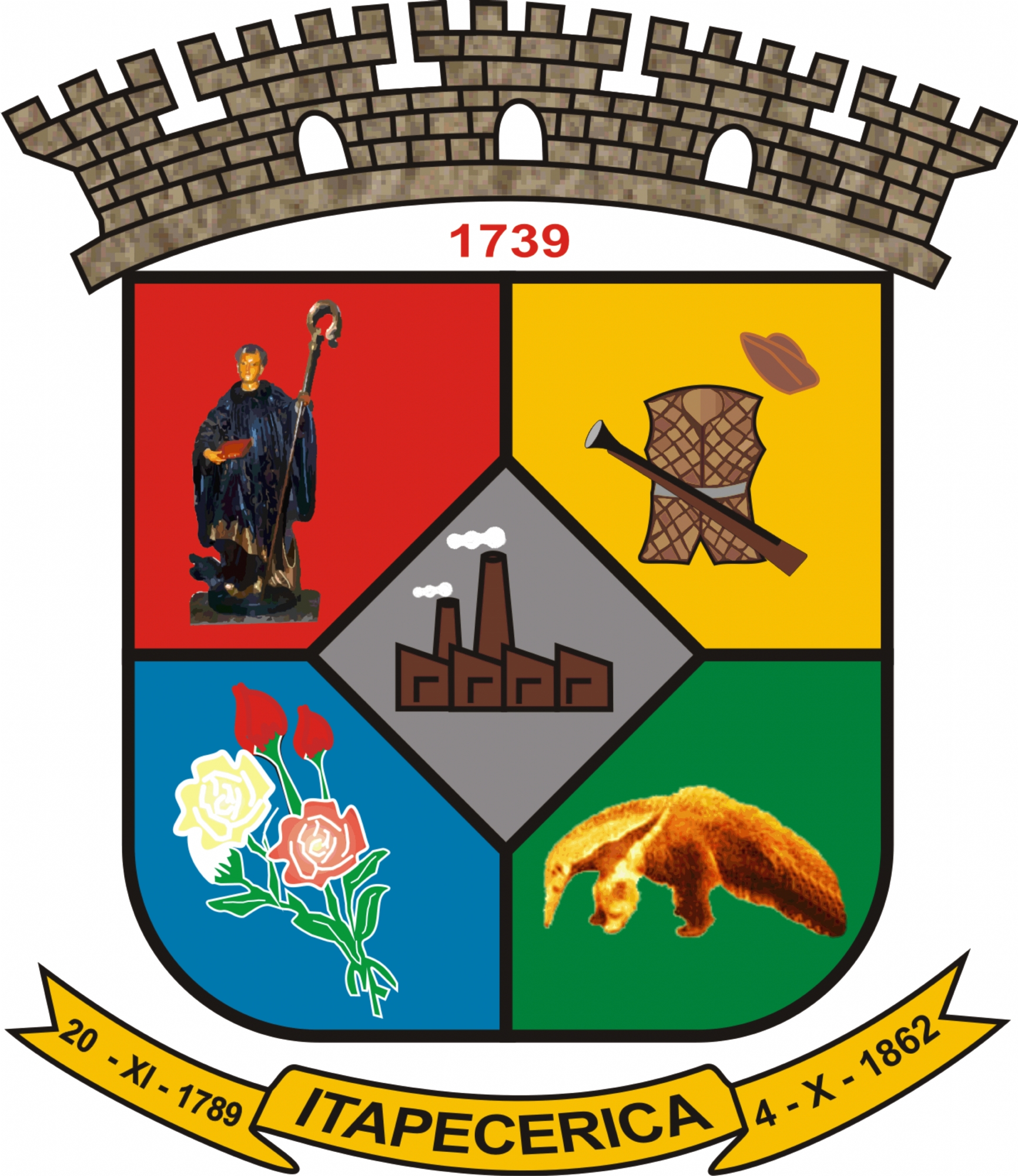
- Flag Coat of arms

- Location in Minas Gerais state

- Location in Brazil
- Coordinates: 20°28′22″S 46°7′33″W
- Country: Brazil
- Region: Southeast
- State: Minas Gerais

Area
  - Total: 1,041 km^{2} (402 sq mi)

Population (2022 Census)
  - Total: 21,046
  - Estimate (2025): 21,456
  - Density: 20.22/km^{2} (52.36/sq mi)
- Time zone: UTC−3 (BRT)

Itapecerica (Portuguese pronunciation: [itapeˈsɛɾikɐ], [itapeˈsɛɾika]) is a municipality located in the center of the Brazilian state of Minas Gerais. The population is 21,456 (2025 est.) in an area of 1,040 km^{2} (400 sq mi). The city belongs to the meso-region of Oeste de Minas and to the micro-region of Formiga. It was founded in 1789.

== History ==
Candindé, an extinct Jê language, was once spoken in the Itapecerica Valley.

== Geography ==
The city center of Itapecerica is located at an elevation of 825 meters east of Formiga and southeast of Divinópolis. Neighboring municipalities are: Divinópolis (N), Cláudio (E), Camacho (S), Oliveira (SE), and Formiga (W).

Distances to other cities

- Belo Horizonte/MG - 180 km
- Formiga/MG - 62 km
- Camacho/MG - 22 km
- Divinópolis/MG - 55 km

== Economic activities ==
Services, mining, and industry are the most important economic activities. There are large deposits of graphite in the region, which is used in making pencils. In 2005 there were 25 extractive industries (mining) employing 404 persons and 89 transformation industries employing 628 persons. The GDP in 2005 was approximately R$121 million, 9 million reais from taxes, 67 million reais from services, 24 million reais from industry, and 19 million reais from agriculture. There were 1,203 rural producers on 86,000 hectares of land (2006). 127 farms had tractors (2006). Approximately 2,500 persons were involved in agriculture. The main crops are coffee, sugarcane, and corn. There were 41,000 head of cattle (2006), a large percentage of which were dairy cattle. Poultry raising was also important.

There were 4 banks (2007). The motor vehicle fleet had 2,525 automobiles, 258 trucks, 196 pickup trucks, and 1,155 motorcycles (2007).

== Health and education ==
In the health sector there were 11 public health clinics and 1 hospital with 59 beds (2005). Patients with more serious health conditions are transported to Formiga or Divinópolis. Educational needs of 4,600 students were met by 19 primary schools, 6 middle schools, and 4 pre-primary schools.

- Municipal Human Development Index: 0.763 (2000)
- State ranking: 200 out of 853 municipalities in 2000
- National ranking: 1514 out of 5,138 municipalities in 2000
- Literacy rate: 85%
- Life expectancy: 72 (average of males and females)

In 2000 the per capita monthly income of R$223.00 was well below the state and national average of R$276.00 and R$297.00 respectively. Poços de Caldas had the highest per capita monthly income in 2000 with R$435.00. The lowest was Setubinha with R$73.00.

The highest ranking municipality in Minas Gerais in 2000 was Poços de Caldas with 0.841, while the lowest was Setubinha with 0.568. Nationally the highest was São Caetano do Sul in São Paulo with 0.919, while the lowest was Setubinha. In more recent statistics (considering 5,507 municipalities) Manari in the state of Pernambuco has the lowest rating in the country—0,467—putting it in last place.

== See also ==
- List of municipalities in Minas Gerais
