= Fumaça (footballer, born 1985) =

Brazilian footballer

Personal information
- Full name: Alessandro Pedro Ribeiro
- Date of birth: 16 June 1985 (age 41)
- Place of birth: Perdigão, Minas Gerais, Brazil
- Height: 1.83 m (6 ft 0 in)
- Position: Striker

Team information
- Current team: Sollefteå GIF

Youth career
- 2006: Noroeste

Senior career*
Years	Team	Apps	(Gls)
2006	Juventus Minasnovense		
2006–2009	Croatia Sesvete		
2008	→ NK Križevci (loan)		
2008	→ HAŠK (loan)		
2009	→ Marsonia 1909 (loan)		
2009	Junsele IF		
2010	Friska Viljor		
2011–	Sollefteå GIF		
- * Club domestic league appearances and goals

Alessandro Pedro Ribeiro nickname Fumaça (born 16 June 1985) is a Brazilian footballer who plays as a striker for Swedish club Sollefteå GIF.

== Career ==
Fumaça was born in Perdigão, Minas Gerais. He previously played with Brazilian clubs Noroeste and Juventus Minasnovense before moving in 2006 to Croatia to play for Croatia Sesvete in the Prva HNL. Until 2009 he had several loan spells with Druga HNL teams such as NK Križevci, NK HAŠK and Marsonia 1909. In summer 2009 he signed with Swedish Junsele IF where he played the following six months. During 2010 he played with Friska Viljor before moving by the end of the year to Sollefteå GIF.
