= São Gonçalo do Pará =

- city
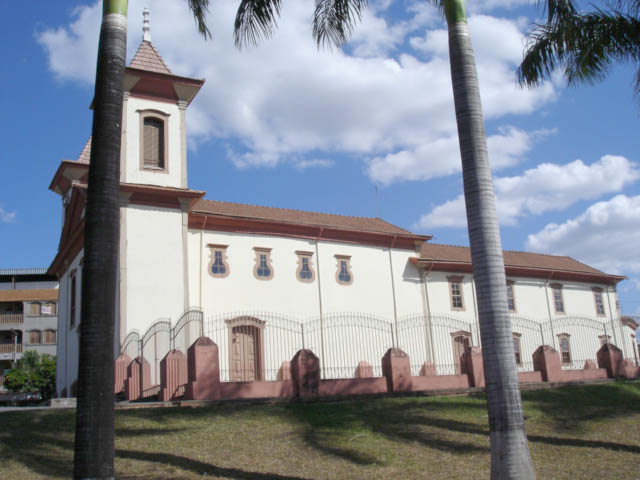

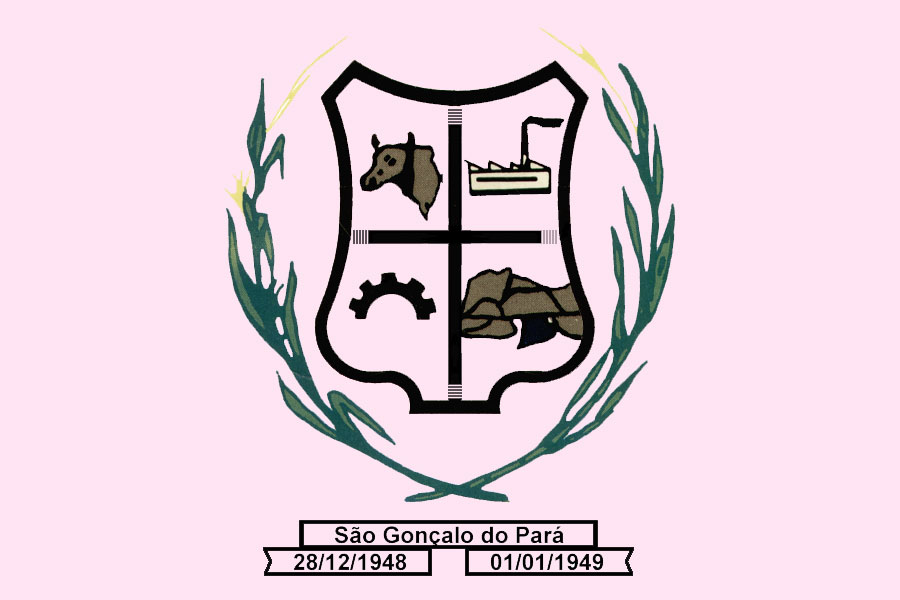
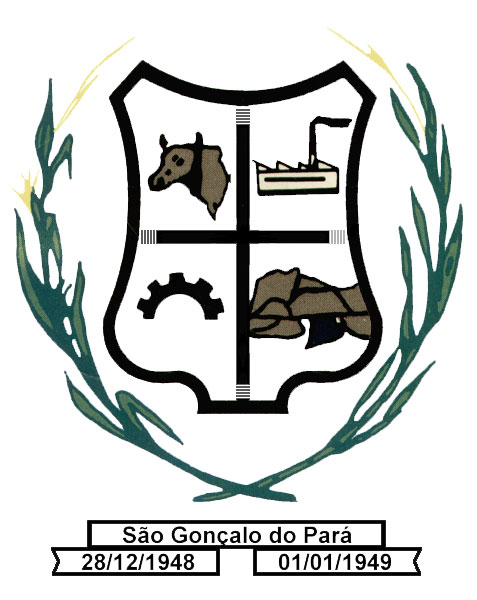
- Flag Coat of arms
- Nickname: Terra do doce
- Location in West Minas Gerais
- Coordinates: 19°58′58″S 44°51′32″W
- Country: Brazil
- Region: Southeast
- State: Minas Gerais
- Founded: 1717
- Incorporated (as city): 1 January 1949

Government
  - Mayor: ÂNGELO JOSÉ RONCALLI DE FREITAS(PSDB)

Area
  - Total: 265 km^{2} (102 sq mi)
- Elevation: 750 m (2,460 ft)

Population (2022 Census)
  - Total: 11,770
  - Estimate (2025): 12,275
  - Density: 31.2/km^{2} (81/sq mi)
- Time zone: UTC−3 (BRT)

São Gonçalo do Pará is a municipality in the center-west of the state of Minas Gerais, Brazil. The estimated population in 2025 was 12,275 inhabitants. The total area of the municipality is 265 km^{2} (102 sq mi) and the elevation is 750 m (2,461 ft). It is located at 129 km (80 mi) from state capital Belo Horizonte. São Gonçalo do Pará is the seat of the regional administration of the Upper São Francisco River.

== History ==
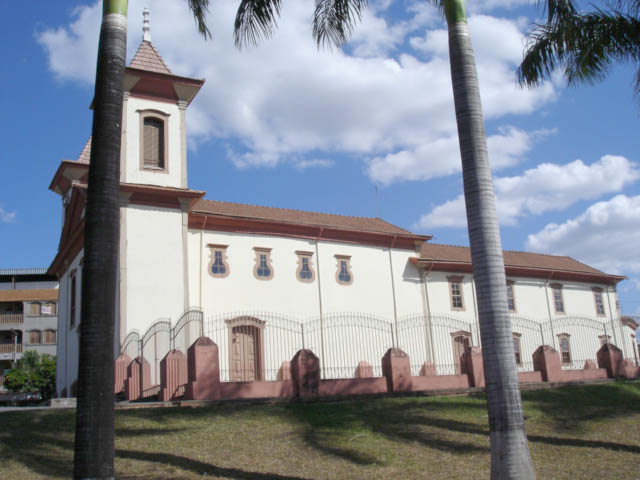
church of São Gonçalo, in center of São Gonçalo do Pará

The founding of the town of São Gonçalo of Pará is closely linked to the revolutionary revolts carried out in 1717 by miners of the Captainship of Minas Gerais. Filipe de Freitas Mourão was a Portuguese gold prospector who worked in the Pitangui mines during the colonial period. He was involved in revolutionary movements opposing the taxation of gold, eventually leading to his having to flee with his wife, Estefânia de Mourão Bravo. They escaped to an area near the source of the Pará River where they found other Portuguese fugitives from Vila Rica (Pero Gonçalves de Amaranto and Estácio Campos de Borgonha).

The Portuguese hired Filipe de Freitas as an overseer of slaves. He oversaw the mines and plantation, and he made excursions to locate traces of gold. Accompanied by slaves, he explored some land next to the Pará River, and discovered a stream with banks suitable for cultivation. They called the place "Ribeirão dos Morais" ("the Morais stream"). There they built wattle and daub huts, moving in once the construction was finished, on 18 December 1723. In a newly built chapel they placed an image of Saint Gonçalo of the Amarante, which they had brought with them.

Filipe continued to explore, taking slaves with him, and found an area rich in hardwood. Here he began construction of a primitive settlement which would later become São Gonçalo of Pará. Construction was completed in 1735, including a chapel with the image of São Gonçalo of the Amarante.

There was a suggestion to name the town "Pará Acima" after a place close to the banks of River Pará where Filipe de Freitas had stopped when he came from Pitangui. The name settled on was "Paragem do Pará" (Stop of Pará), on 7 September 1735. In 1750 the name of the town was changed to São Gonçalo of Pará, alluding to the Pará River, which had brought the founders and remains one of the borders of the city.

Between 1751 and 1755, a new church in the baroque style was built on the site of the old chapel.

In 1870, the town of São Gonçalo of Pará became part of the district of Pitangui and was annexed to the village Vila de Nossa Senhora da Piedade (presently Pará de Minas).

The town became politically emancipated on 1 January 1949.

== Economy ==
The city's economy is based on gold extraction, livestock farming, and the planting of corn, beans and sugar cane.

== Gallery ==
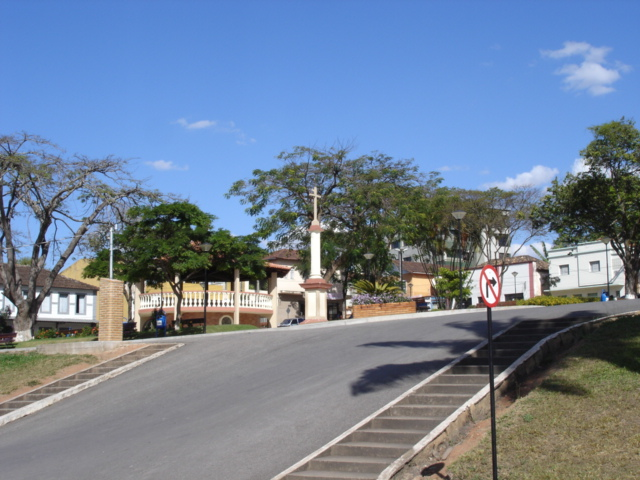

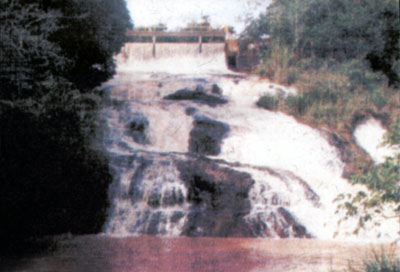
