= Concórdia Futebol Clube =

Concórdia
- Full name: Concórdia Futebol Clube
- Nickname(s): Galo do Oeste
- Founded: 9 May 2003
- Dissolved: 2005
- Ground: Estádio Domingos Machado de Lima, Concórdia, Santa Catarina state, Brazil
- Capacity: 3,000
Home colors	Away colors

Concórdia Futebol Clube, commonly known as Concórdia, is a Brazilian football club based in Concórdia, Santa Catarina state.

== History ==
The club was founded on May 9, 2003.

== Stadium ==
Concórdia Futebol Clube play their home games at Estádio Domingos Machado de Lima. The stadium has a maximum capacity of 3,000 people.
