= Rodriguinho (footballer, born 1994) =

Brazilian footballer (born 1994)

Personal information
- Full name: Rodrigo Henrique Oliveira Alves
- Date of birth: March 6, 1994 (age 32)
- Place of birth: Goiânia, Brazil
- Position: Midfielder

Team information
- Current team: Juventus-SP

Youth career
- 2010-2013: Umuarama

Senior career*
Years	Team	Apps	(Gls)
2013-2015	Grêmio Anápolis	24	(0)
2016	Goianésia	2	(0)
2017	Iporá	14	(2)
2017	Aparecidense	3	(0)
2018	Iporá	18	(6)
2018	Bragantino	4	(0)
2019	Goianésia	13	(5)
2019	Aparecidense	6	(4)
2019	Votuporanguense	0	(0)
2019	Rio Verde	8	(1)
2020	Goianésia	14	(1)
2020	Capital	2	(0)
2020-2023	Aparecidense	99	(4)
2023-2024	América de Natal	27	(2)
2025	Capital	22	(0)
2025	Floresta	11	(0)
2026	Capital	20	(3)
2026–	Juventus-SP	0	(0)
- * Club domestic league appearances and goals as of 23 July 2026

Rodrigo Henrique Oliveira Alves (born 6 March 1994), commonly known as Rodriguinho, is a Brazilian footballer who plays as a midfielder for Juventus.

== Club career ==
=== Early career ===
Born in Goiânia, in the state of Goiás, Rodriguinho began his career playing for his hometown club, Umuarama, before being signed by Grêmio Anápolis after standing out as the club's top scorer. He subsequently had spells with Iporá and Goianésia.

=== Aparecidense ===
Rodriguinho had several stints with Aparecidense, first joining the Goiás-based club in 2018 and returning on multiple occasions over the following years, amassing more than five seasons with the team in total. During his time at the club he was part of the squad that won the Série D in 2021.

=== América-RN ===
On 18 May 2023, Rodriguinho signed for América-RN, reuniting with coach Thiago Carvalho, with whom he had previously worked at Aparecidense. With the Rio Grande do Norte-based club, he won the Campeonato Potiguar in 2024.

=== Capital and Floresta ===
Rodriguinho later joined Capital CF, with whom he scored a goal in a 3–1 win over Porto Velho in the second round of the 2025 Copa do Brasil, helping the Brasília-based club reach the third round of the competition for the first time in its history. He also had a spell with Floresta-CE, in the state of Ceará, before returning to Capital-CF for the 2026 season.

=== Juventus ===
On 22 July 2026, Rodriguinho signed for Juventus to bolster the club's squad for the remainder of the Copa Paulista, arriving after a spell at Capital CF, with whom he had played the Série D and the Copa do Brasil during the season. In 2026, prior to the move, he had made 26 appearances and scored three goals for Capital CF across the Série D, the Copa do Brasil, the Copa Centro-Oeste and the Campeonato Candango, accumulating more than 2,100 minutes of play.

== Honours ==
Aparecidense

- Campeonato Brasileiro Série D: 2021

América-RN

- Campeonato Potiguar: 2024

== Career statistics ==
As of match played 22 September 2026

Appearances and goals by club and season
Club	Season	League			State League		Cup		Continental		Other		Total	
Club	Season	Division	Apps	Goals	Apps	Goals	Apps	Goals	Apps	Goals	Apps	Goals	Apps	Goals
Grêmio Anápolis	2013	Goiano	—		2	0	—		—		—		2	0
Grêmio Anápolis	2014	Goiano	—		9	0	—		—		—		9	0
Grêmio Anápolis	2015	Goiano	—		13	0	—		—		—		13	0
Grêmio Anápolis	Total		—		24	0	—		—		—		24	0
Goianésia	2016	Goiano	—		2	0	—		—		—		2	0
Iporá	2017	Goiano	—		14	2	—		—		—		14	2
Aparecidense	2017	Série D	3	0	—		—		—		—		3	0
Iporá	2018	Série D	5	2	13	4	—		—		—		18	6
Red Bull Bragantino	2018	Série C	4	0	—		—		—		10 (Note: Appearance(s) in Copa Paulista)	0	14	0
Goianésia	2019	Goiano	—		13	5	—		—		—		13	5
Aparecidense	2019	Série D	6	4	—		—		—		—		6	4
CA Votuporanguense	2019	Série A2	—		—		—		—		7	0	7	0
Rio Verde-GO	2019	Goiano 2ª Divisão	—		8	1	—		—		—		8	1
Goianésia	2020	Goiano	—		14	1	—		—		—		14	1
Capital CF	2020	Brasiliense	—		2	0	—		—		—		2	0
Aparecidense	2020	Série D	19	2	—		—		—		2 (Note: Appearance(s) in Copa Verde)	0	21	2
Aparecidense	2021	Série D	22	1	13	0	—		—		—		35	1
Aparecidense	2022	Série C	22	1	10	0	—		—		—		32	1
Aparecidense	2023	Série C	—		13	0	—		—		—		13	0
Aparecidense	Total		63	4	36	0	—		—		2	0	101	4
América-RN	2023	Série C	15	0	—		—		—		—		15	0
América-RN	2024	Série D	2	0	10	2	2	0	—		6 (Note: Appearance(s) in Copa do Nordeste)	0	20	2
América-RN	Total		17	0	10	2	2	0	—		6	0	35	2
Capital CF	2025	Série D	10	0	12	0	4	2	—		2	0	28	2
Floresta-CE	2025	Série C	11	0	—		—		—		—		11	0
Capital CF	2026	Série D	11	2	9	1	2	0	—		4 (Note: Appearance(s) in Copa Centro-Oeste)	0	26	3
Juventus-SP	2026	Paulista A2	—		—		—		—		6 (Note: Appearance(s) in Copa Paulista)	0	6	0
Career total			130	10	157	16	8	2	0	0	37	0	332	30
