= Cláudio, Minas Gerais =

Cláudio
- Municipality
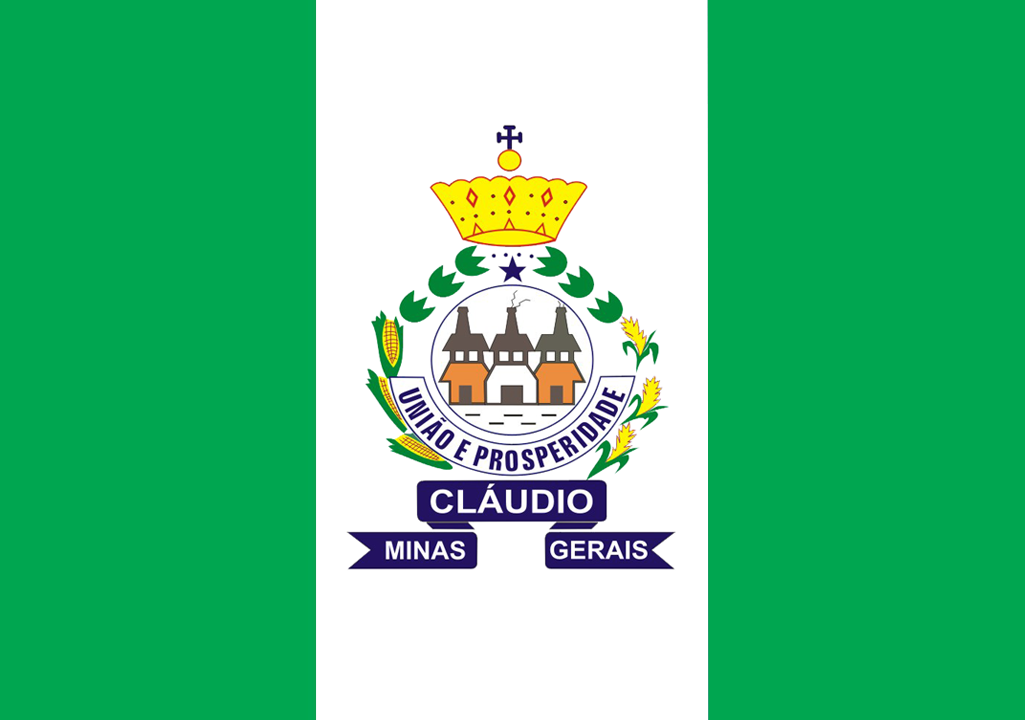
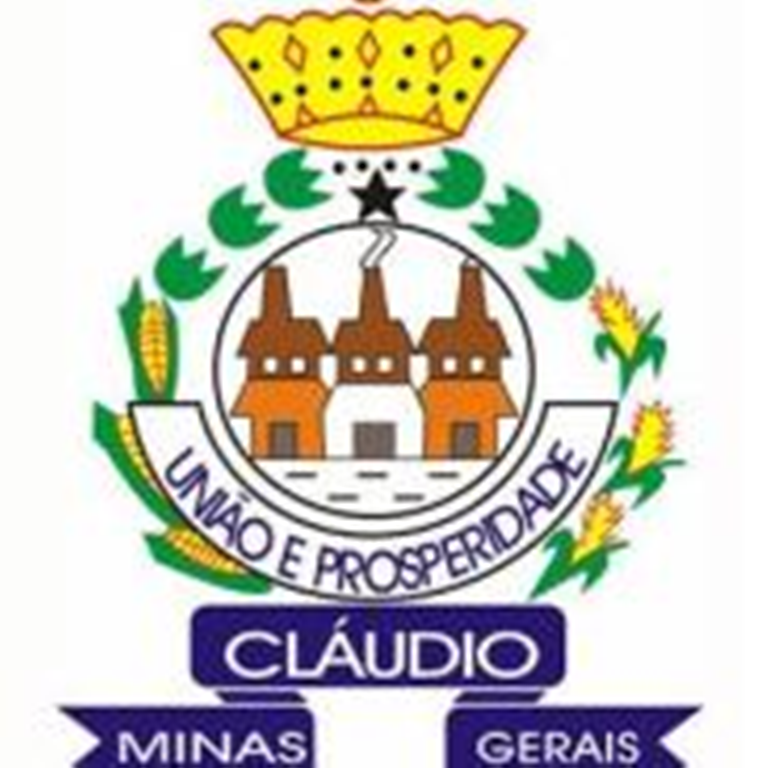
- Flag Coat of arms
- Motto(s): Portuguese: União e Prosperidade (Union and Prosperity)
- Location in Minas Gerais

- Location in Brazil
- Coordinates: 20°26′34″S 44°45′57″W
- Country: Brazil
- Region: Southeast
- State: Minas Gerais
- Mesoregion: Oeste de Minas
- Microregion: Divinópolis

Area
  - Total: 630.706 km^{2} (243.517 sq mi)
- Elevation: 832 m (2,730 ft)

Population (2022 Census)
  - Total: 30,159
  - Estimate (2025): 31,936
- Time zone: UTC−3 ( BRT)

Cláudio is a municipality in the state of Minas Gerais in the Southeast region of Brazil.

== See also ==
- List of municipalities in Minas Gerais
