= Formiga, Minas Gerais =

Municipality in Minas Gerais, Brazil

Formiga
- Municipality
- Municipality of Formiga
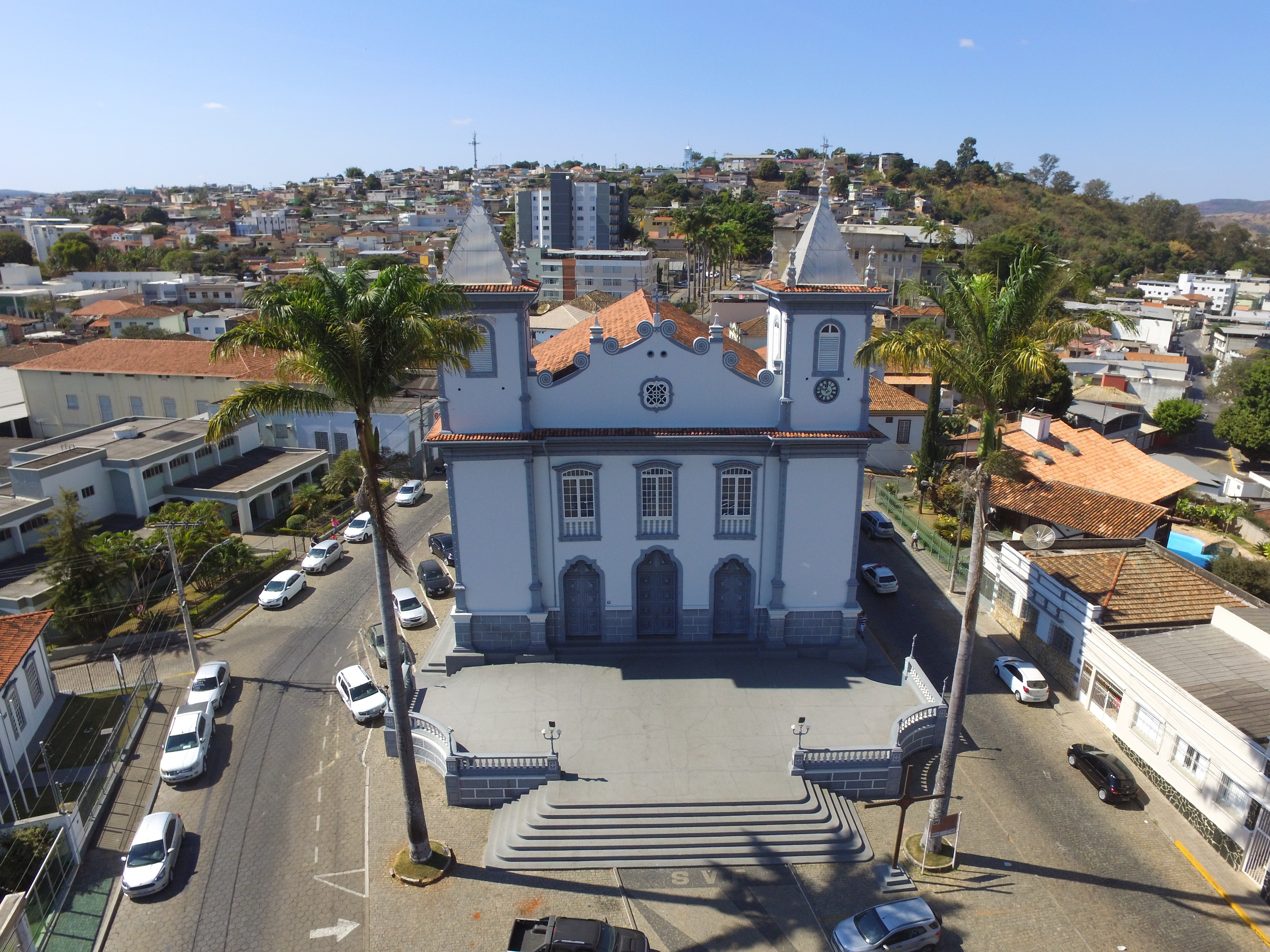
- São Vicente Ferrer Church and central Formiga

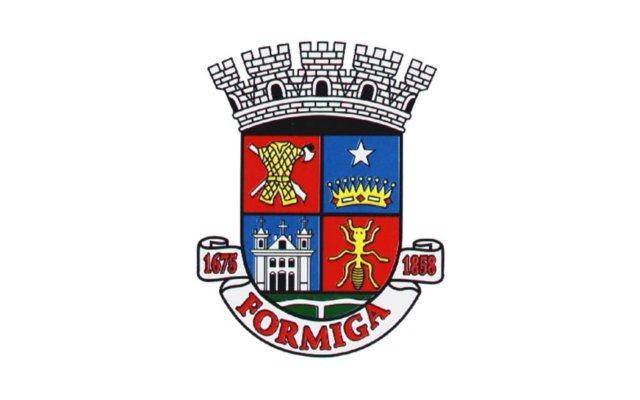
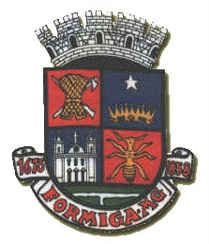
- Flag Coat of arms

- Location in Minas Gerais

- Location in Minas Gerais Location in Brazil
- Coordinates: 20°27′50″S 45°25′33″W
- Country: Brazil
- Region: Southeast
- State: Minas Gerais
- Intermediate region: Divinópolis
- Immediate region: Formiga
- Municipality created: 16 March 1839
- Municipality installed: 29 September 1839
- City status: 6 June 1858
- Districts: Formiga (seat), Albertos, Baiões, and Pontevila

Government
  - Mayor: Laércio dos Reis Gomes (PL)
  - Term: 2025–2028

Area
  - Total: 1,501.915 km^{2} (579.893 sq mi)
- Elevation: 785 m (2,575 ft)

Population (2022 census)
  - Total: 68,248
  - Estimate (2025): 70,897
  - Density: 45.441/km^{2} (117.69/sq mi)
- Demonym: formiguense
- Time zone: UTC−3 (BRT)
- Postal code: 35570-000 to 35577-999
- Area code: 37
- HDI (2010): 0.755 (high)
- GDP per capita (2023): R$43,506.98
- Website: www.formiga.mg.gov.br

Formiga is a municipality in central-western Minas Gerais, Brazil. It had a population of 68,248 in the 2022 census, with an estimated population of 70,897 in 2025, in an area of 1,501.915 km^{2} (579.893 sq mi). It is part of the Immediate Geographic Region of Formiga, within the Intermediate Geographic Region of Divinópolis. The municipality was created in 1839 and received city status in 1858.

== Geography ==
=== Statistical Micro-region ===
Formiga is a statistical micro-region containing municipalities: Arcos, Camacho, Córrego Fundo, Formiga, Itapecerica, Pains, Pedra do Indaiá, and Pimenta. In 2000 the population of this area was 144,506 in an area of 4,577.20 km^{2}. The population density in 2000 was 31.57 inhabitants/km^{2}.

=== Location ===
The municipal seat lies at an elevation of 785 metres, near the MG-050 highway. Neighboring municipalities are: Pains, Córrego Fundo, Arcos, and Japaraíba (North), Pedra do Indaiá, Itapecerica, Camacho (East), Candeias, Cristais, and Guapé (South), and Pimenta (West).

=== Communications ===
Formiga is linked to Belo Horizonte by MG-050 and lies 2 km south of the highway junction. There is also a railroad line carrying freight. The closest point on the Furnas reservoir is 25 km to the southwest.

Distances to other cities

- Divinópolis: 76 km
- Bom Despacho: 110 km
- Lavras: 115 km
- Arcos: 26 km
- Belo Horizonte: 194 km
- Rio de Janeiro: 545 km
- São Paulo: 470 km
- Brasília: 812 km

=== Weather ===
- Average annual temperature: 21.3 C
- Maximum annual temperature: 26.2 C
- Minimum annual temperature: 15.1 C
- Average annual rainfall index: 1.400 mm

Main rivers: Rio Formiga, Rio Mata-Cavalo, Rio Pouso Alegre and Furnas Reservoir. Formiga is located in the Grande River basin.

== Economy ==
Services, light industry, and agriculture are the most important economic activities. In 2004 there were 2,481 enterprises, of which the majority were concentrated in the commerce sector, vehicle repair, and sales of personal and domestic objects. The GDP in 2005 was approximately R$474 million, R$44 million from taxes, 311 million reais from services, 67 million reais from industry, and 50 million reais from agriculture. There were 1,865 rural producers on 77,000 hectares of land (2006). 229 farms had tractors (2006). Approximately 5,600 persons were employed in agriculture. The main crops are coffee, beans, soybeans, rice, sugarcane, and corn. There were 69,000 head of cattle (2006). Poultry raising was also substantial with two hundred head in 2006.

There were 7 banks (2007). The motor vehicle fleet had 13,066 automobiles, 1,281 trucks, 1,255 pickup trucks, and 5,894 motorcycles. The ratio of inhabitant per motor vehicle was 3 vehicles per inhabitant.

Working population by sector (2005)

- Transformation industries (508 units): 4,368 workers
- Construction (21 units): 974 workers
- Commerce (1,447 units): 4,612 workers
- Lodging and restaurants (124 units): 339 workers
- Transport, storage, communications (132 units): 730 workers
- Public administration: 1,694 workers
- Health and social services: 512 workers

== Health and education ==
In the health sector there were 31 public health clinics (2005) and 2 private hospitals with 116 beds. Patients with more serious health conditions are transported to Divinópolis. Educational needs of 13,800 students were met by 30 primary schools, 8 middle schools, and 25 pre-primary schools. The private university UNIPAC has a campus in the city offering 19 undergraduate courses and 3 post-graduate courses. Formiga has one institute of higher learning—the Centro Universitário de Formiga UNIFORMG, offering 17 majors.

- Municipal Human Development Index: 0.793 (2000)
- State ranking: 65 out of 853 municipalities as of 2000
- National ranking: 736 out of 5,138 municipalities as of 2000
- Literacy rate: 91%
- Life expectancy: 74 (average of males and females)

In 2000 the per capita monthly income of R$254.00 was below the state and national average of R$276.00 and R$297.00 respectively. Poços de Caldas had the highest per capita monthly income in 2000 with R$435.00. The lowest was Setubinha with R$73.00.

The highest ranking municipality in Minas Gerais in 2000 was Poços de Caldas with 0.841, while the lowest was Setubinha with 0.568. Nationally the highest was São Caetano do Sul in São Paulo with 0.919, while the lowest was Setubinha. In more recent statistics (considering 5,507 municipalities) Manari in the state of Pernambuco has the lowest rating in the country—0,467—putting it in last place.

== Tourism ==
In recent years, due to the proximity of the Furnas reservoir tourism has grown substantially. Furnas is an artificial lake fed by the Rio Grande and Sapucaí rivers and has an area of more than 1,400 km^{2}. It is so big—the largest in Brazil when it was built in the 1960s—that it is called the Sea of Mina Gerais. According to the city government site, the city had 7 hotels.

== Notable people ==
- Marcelo Garcia

== See also ==
- List of municipalities in Minas Gerais
