= Oeste de Minas (mesoregion) =

- Mesoregion
- Location of the Mesoregion of West of Minas
- Coordinates: 20°27′50″S 45°25′33″W
- Country: Brazil
- Region: Southeast
- State: Minas Gerais

Area
  - Total: 24,043.467 km^{2} (9,283.235 sq mi)

Population (2010/IBGE)
  - Total: 922,656
  - Density: 38.4/km^{2} (99/sq mi)
- Time zone: UTC-3 (BRT)
  - Summer (DST): UTC-2 (BRST)
- Area code: +55 35

Oeste de Minas (English: Western Minas) is one of the twelve mesoregions of the Brazilian state of Minas Gerais. It is composed of 44 municipalities, distributed across 5 microregions.
