= Diego Fumaça =

Brazilian footballer (born 1994)

Personal information
- Full name: Diego César de Oliveira
- Date of birth: 18 December 1994 (age 31)
- Place of birth: Barbacena, Brazil
- Height: 1.76 m (5 ft 9 1/2 in)
- Position: Midfielder

Team information
- Current team: Uberlândia
- Number: 35

Senior career*
Years	Team	Apps	(Gls)
2015	Araxá	0	(0)
2016	Valeriodoce	0	(0)
2017	Patrocinense	0	(0)
2017–2018	Ipatinga	0	(0)
2018	Atlético Mineiro (U20)	0	(0)
2019	Goiânia	0	(0)
2019	Atlético Goianiense	1	(0)
2019–2020	Marcílio Dias	4	(0)
2020–2021	Goiânia	14	(0)
2021–2025	Athletic	86	(1)
2021	→ Villa Nova (loan)		
2021	→ Coimbra (loan)		
2022	→ Pouso Alegre (loan)	5	(0)
2022	→ Helsingborgs IF (loan)	10	(0)
2023	→ Vitória (loan)	5	(0)
2023	→ Amazonas (loan)	4	(0)
2026–	Uberlândia	25	(0)
- * Club domestic league appearances and goals as of 18 December 2025

Diego César de Oliveira, commonly known as Diego Fumaça, is a Brazilian footballer who plays as a midfielder for Uberlândia.

== Career ==
Diego Fumaça spent his early years playing in the lower divisions of Campeonato Mineiro. He represented Araxá and Valeriodoce, won the Modulo II with Patrocinense and won the 2nd division with Ipatinga in 2017. In 2019, he competed in Campeonato Goiano with Goiânia, and earned himself a transfer to Atlético Goianiense on 15 April 2019. He made his national league debut for Atlético Goianiense in the Campeonato Brasileiro Série B match against Vitória on 26 May 2019, coming on as a late substitute in the 1–1 draw.
