= Carmo do Cajuru =

- Municipality
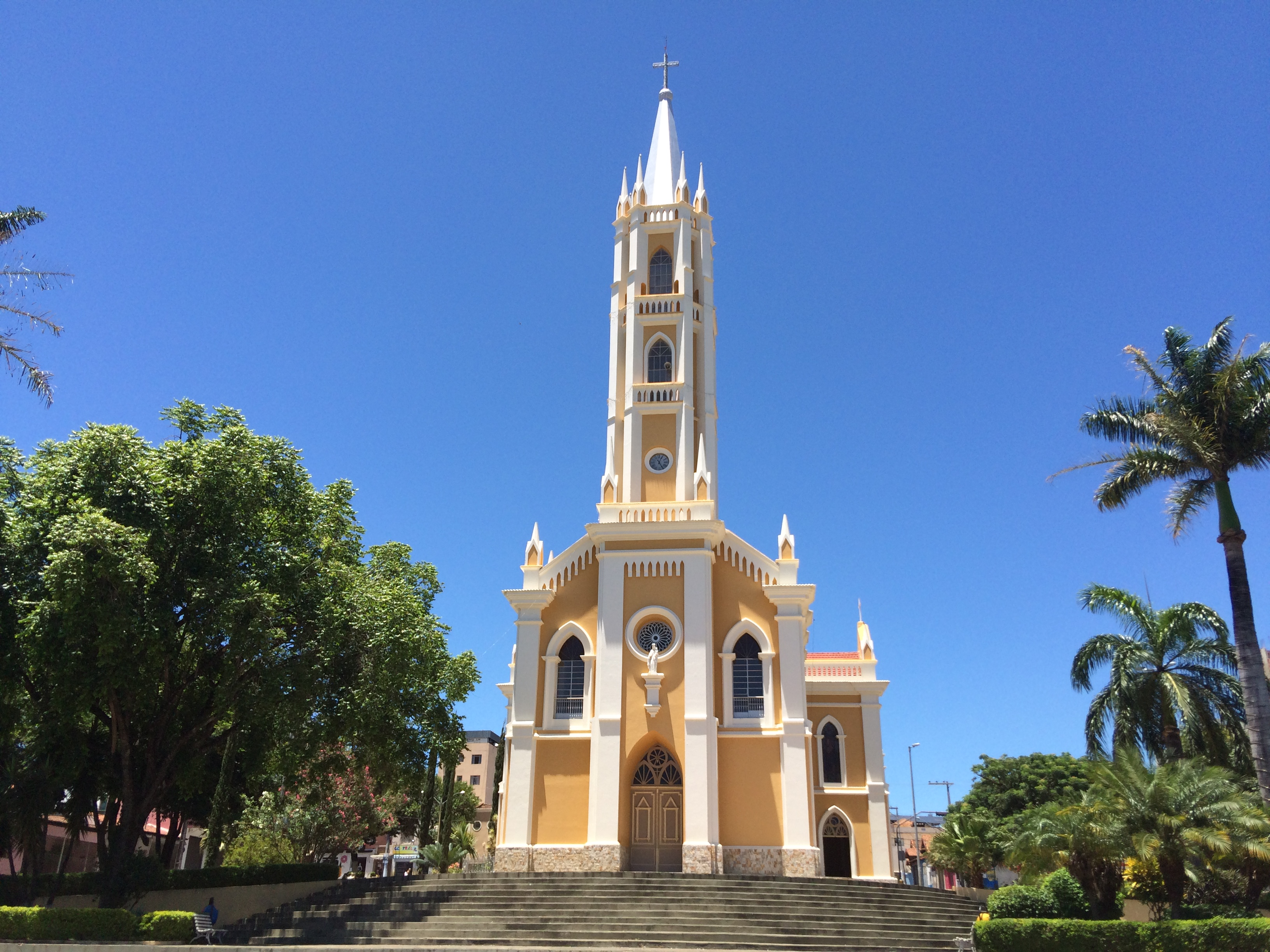
- Nossa Senhora do Carmo church

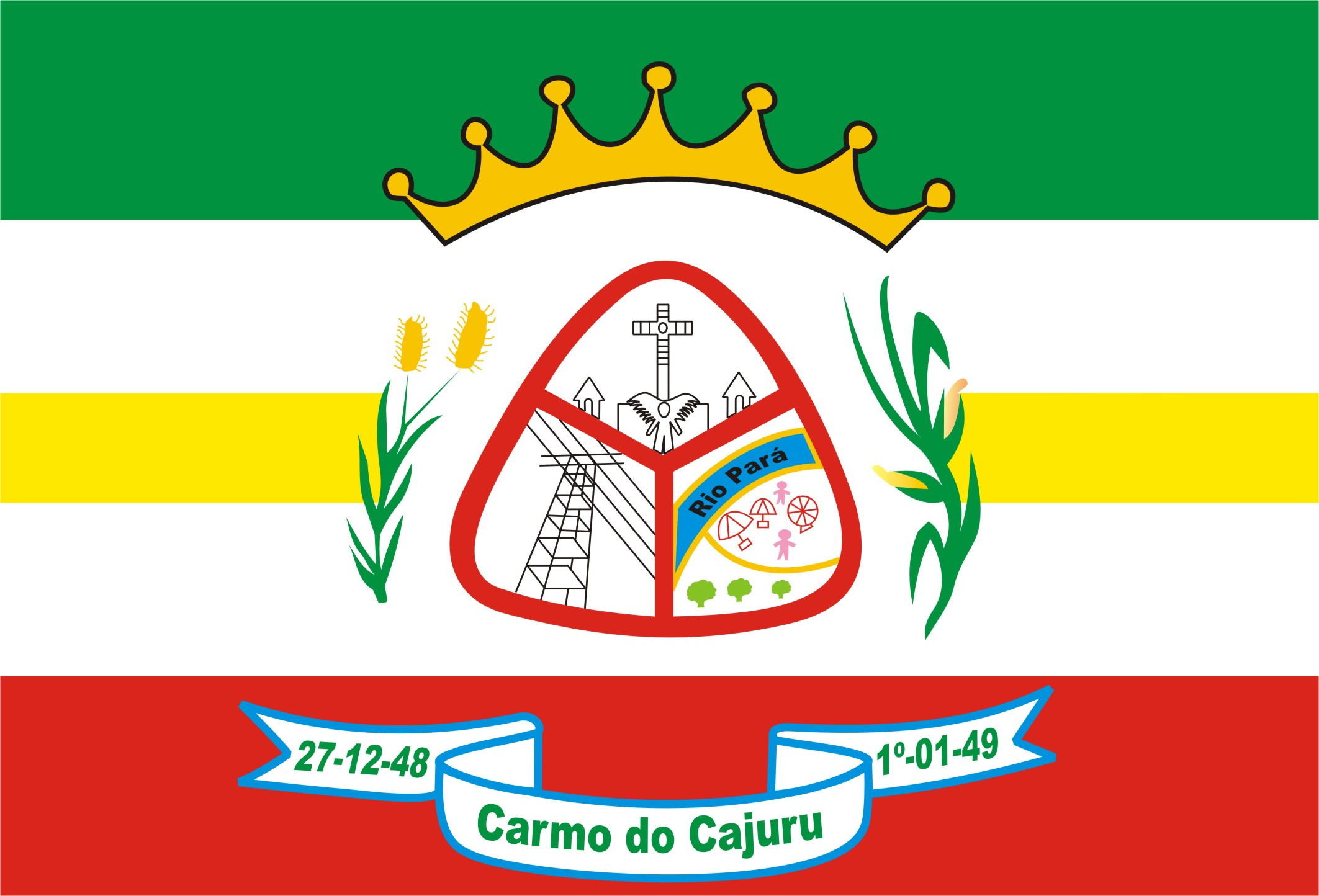
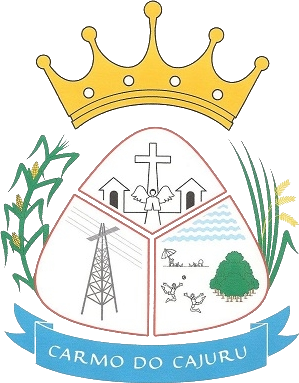
- Flag Coat of arms
- Nickname: Cajuru
- Location in Brazil
- Coordinates: 20°11′2″S 44°46′15″W
- Country: Brazil
- Region: Southeast
- State: Minas Gerais
- Mesoregion: Oeste de Minas

Area
  - Total: 175,678 sq mi (455,005 km^{2})
- Elevation: 231,600 ft (70,600 m)

Population (2022 Census)
  - Total: 23,479
  - Estimate (2025): 24,581
  - Density: 110/sq mi (44/km^{2})
- Time zone: UTC−3 (BRT)

Carmo do Cajuru is a municipality in the state of Minas Gerais in the Southeast region of Brazil.

== See also ==
- List of municipalities in Minas Gerais
