= Perdigão, Minas Gerais =

Coordinates: 19°57′S 45°04′W

- Municipality
- Interactive map of Perdigão, Minas Gerais
- Country: Brazil
- Region: Southeast
- State: Minas Gerais
- Mesoregion: Oeste de Minas

Government
  - Mayor: Gilmar Teodoro (PSDB)

Population (2022 Census)
  - Total: 12,268
  - Estimate (2025): 13,118
- Time zone: UTC−3 (BRT)

Perdigão (/ˌpɜːrdiːˈɡaʊn/ PUR-dee-GOWN; Brazilian Portuguese pronunciation: [peʁdʒiˈgɐ̃w]) is a municipality in the state of Minas Gerais in the Southeast region of Brazil.

== See also ==
- List of municipalities in Minas Gerais
