= São Sebastião do Oeste =

- Municipality
- Location in Brazil
- Coordinates: 20°16′33″S 45°00′18″W
- Country: Brazil
- Region: Southeast
- State: Minas Gerais
- Mesoregion: Oeste de Minas

Population (2022 Census)
  - Total: 8,815
  - Estimate (2025): 9,527
- Time zone: UTC−3 (BRT)

São Sebastião do Oeste is a municipality in the state of Minas Gerais in the Southeast region of Brazil.

== See also ==
- List of municipalities in Minas Gerais
