= São Sebastião do Paraíso =

Municipality in Minas Gerais, Brazil

Coordinates: 20°55′01″S 46°59′27″W

- Municipality
- Municipality of São Sebastião do Paraíso
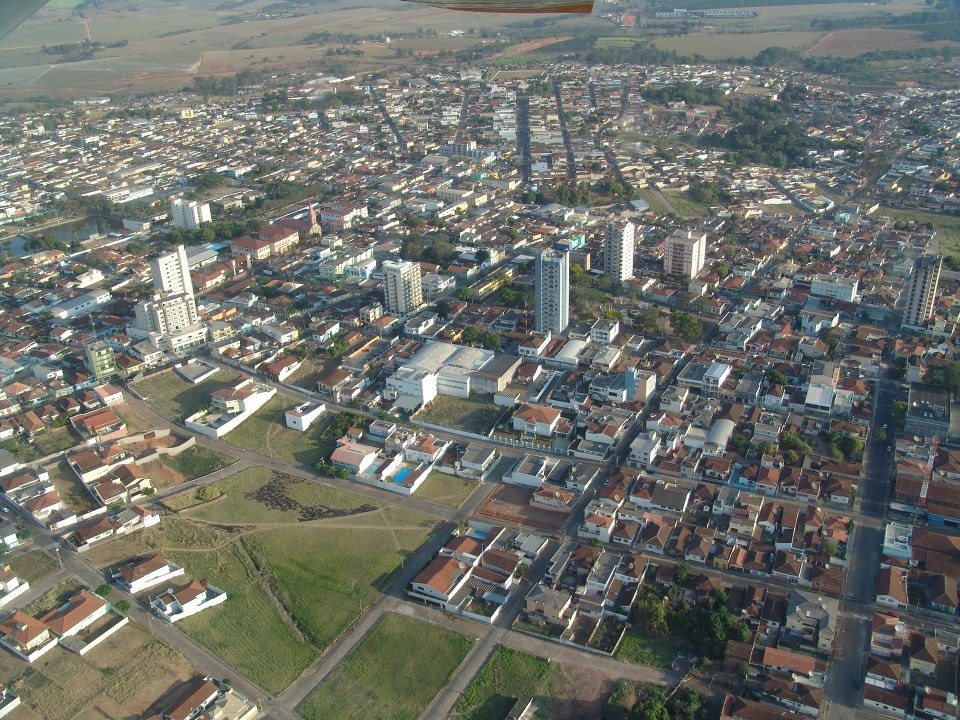

- Flag Coat of arms

- Location in Minas Gerais
- Country: Brazil
- State: Minas Gerais
- Region: Southeast
- Intermediate Region: Varginha
- Immediate Region: São Sebastião do Paraíso
- Founded: 25 October 1821

Government
  - Mayor: Marcelo Morais (PODE)

Area
  - Total: 814.925 km^{2} (314.644 sq mi)
- Elevation: 973 m (3,192 ft)

Population (2022)
  - Total: 71,796
  - Density: 88.101/km^{2} (228.18/sq mi)
- Demonym: paraisense
- Time zone: UTC−3:30 (MGT)
- Postal Code: 37950-000 to 37959-999
- HDI (2010): 0.722 – high
- Website: ssparaiso.mg.gov.br

São Sebastião do Paraíso is a Brazilian municipality located in the southwest of the state of Minas Gerais. Its population as of 2020 was 71,445 people living in a total area of 822 km^{2} (317 sq mi). The city belongs to the meso-region of Sul e Sudoeste de Minas and to the micro-region of São Sebastião do Paraíso. It became a municipality in 1870. The city and surrounding area are famous for the growing of high-quality coffee.

== Geography ==
The city center of São Sebastião do Paraíso is located at an elevation of 991 meters in a fertile region between the state boundary of São Paulo and the great reservoir of Furnas. Neighboring municipalities are: São Tomás de Aquino (NW), Capetinga (N), Pratápolis (NE), Fortaleza de Minas (E) Jacuí (SE), Monte Santo de Minas (S), Itamogi, Santo Antônio da Alegria and Altinópolis (SW), and Patrocínio Paulista (W).

The municipality contains the 248-hectare (610-acre) São Sebastião do Paraíso Biological Reserve, a strictly protected conservation unit created in 1974.

=== Statistical Micro-region ===
São Sebastião do Paraíso is a statistical micro-region consisting of 14 municipalities: Arceburgo, Cabo Verde, Guaranésia, Guaxupé, Itamogi, Jacuí, Juruaia, Monte Belo, Monte Santo de Minas, Muzambinho, Nova Resende, São Pedro da União, São Sebastião do Paraíso, and São Tomás de Aquino. In 2000 the population was 245,490 inhabitants living in a total area of 5,159.70 km^{2} (1,992.17 sq mi).

=== Geographical Facts ===
Altitude

- Maximum: 1183m; Place: Serra do Chapadão
- Minimum: 894m; Place: Foz Ribeirão Água Quente
- Center of the city: 980m

Temperature

- Annual average: 20.6 C
- Average annual maximum: 27.5 C
- Average annual minimum: 15.5 C

Average annual rainfall: 1,690mm

Terrain

- Flat: 8%
- Hilly: 74%
- Mountainous: 18%

Main Rivers

- Ribeirão Fundo, Ribeirão São Domingos, and Rio Santana

Distances

- Belo Horizonte: 400 km east on MG-050
- Passos: 52 km
- Campinas: 240 km
- Franca: 112 km
- Uberaba: 240 km
- Ribeirão Preto: 112 km
- Brasília: 780 km (For local distances see City site)

=== Climate ===
Climate data for São Sebastião do Paraíso (1981–2010 normals, extremes 1961–present)
Month	Jan	Feb	Mar	Apr	May	Jun	Jul	Aug	Sep	Oct	Nov	Dec	Year
Record high °C (°F)	35.8 (96.4)	36.3 (97.3)	34.4 (93.9)	33.4 (92.1)	32.2 (90.0)	30.4 (86.7)	31.4 (88.5)	34.6 (94.3)	36.8 (98.2)	38.4 (101.1)	35.8 (96.4)	34.4 (93.9)	38.4 (101.1)
Mean daily maximum °C (°F)	28.7 (83.7)	29.2 (84.6)	29.0 (84.2)	28.6 (83.5)	26.2 (79.2)	25.4 (77.7)	25.8 (78.4)	27.8 (82.0)	29.2 (84.6)	29.5 (85.1)	28.8 (83.8)	28.3 (82.9)	28.0 (82.4)
Daily mean °C (°F)	22.9 (73.2)	23.0 (73.4)	22.7 (72.9)	21.6 (70.9)	18.7 (65.7)	17.3 (63.1)	17.4 (63.3)	19.1 (66.4)	21.4 (70.5)	22.4 (72.3)	22.7 (72.9)	22.5 (72.5)	21.0 (69.8)
Mean daily minimum °C (°F)	18.3 (64.9)	18.1 (64.6)	17.6 (63.7)	15.8 (60.4)	12.4 (54.3)	11.0 (51.8)	10.7 (51.3)	12.0 (53.6)	14.8 (58.6)	16.6 (61.9)	17.6 (63.7)	18.0 (64.4)	15.2 (59.4)
Record low °C (°F)	12.7 (54.9)	12.9 (55.2)	9.5 (49.1)	4.0 (39.2)	1.6 (34.9)	−1.9 (28.6)	−2.8 (27.0)	0.0 (32.0)	1.4 (34.5)	7.3 (45.1)	9.6 (49.3)	11.4 (52.5)	−2.8 (27.0)
Average precipitation mm (inches)	335.5 (13.21)	245.4 (9.66)	203.9 (8.03)	77.0 (3.03)	65.9 (2.59)	23.7 (0.93)	18.0 (0.71)	19.8 (0.78)	68.9 (2.71)	148.2 (5.83)	209.8 (8.26)	328.4 (12.93)	1,744.5 (68.68)
Average precipitation days (≥ 1.0 mm)	17	14	12	6	4	2	2	2	6	9	12	17	103
Average relative humidity (%)	80.5	79.5	79.8	75.5	74.8	72.7	66.8	59.4	59.4	66.9	73.3	79.4	72.3
Mean monthly sunshine hours	170.9	178.1	199.7	210.7	199.1	187.0	218.6	239.8	203.3	203.6	193.0	168.1	2,371.9
Source: Instituto Nacional de Meteorologia

== Demographics ==
=== Ethnic Origin ===
Race	Percentage
White	81,6%
Black	4,1%
Multiracial/Pardo	10,0%
Asian	4,2%
Indigenous	0,1%

Source: Censo 2000

== Economic activities ==
Industry is the main economic activity of the municipality and is mainly centered in the production of surgical material, clothing (mainly lingerie), and leather goods, from tanning to the manufacture of shoes. In 2005 384 transformation industries employing 6,165 workers. Other sectors were the retail sector employing 4,693 workers, public administration employing 1,307, and health services employing 878 workers. The GDP in 2005 was approximately R$577 million, with 63 from taxes, 343 million reais from services, 104 million reais from industry, and 68 million reais from agriculture.

The region is a major producer of coffee and milk products. There were 968 rural producers on 55,000 hectares of land, meaning that the size of the landholdings was relatively small. Approximately 8,400 persons were occupied in agriculture. The main crops are coffee (13,000 hectares), sugarcane, figs, peaches, citrus fruits, rice, beans, and corn (15,000 hectares). There were 44,000 head of cattle, of which 16,000 were milk cows (2006).

There are 9 banks (2007): Banco ABN AMRO Real, Banco do Brasil, Bradesco, HSBC Bank Brasil S/A, Caixa Econômica Federal, Banco Itaú, Banco Mercantil do Brasil, ParaísoCred, and Credipar.

In the vehicle fleet there were 14,848 automobiles, 1,237 trucks, 1,264 pickup trucks, 135 buses, and 3,650 motorcycles (2007).

== Health and education ==
In the health sector there were 24 public health establishments and 24 private establishments which included 29 health clinics and 4 hospitals with 325 beds (2005). Educational needs of 14,100 students were met by 32 primary schools, 7 middle schools, and 30 pre-primary schools. In higher education there were 2 schools: Faculdade de Ciências Económics, Administração, e Contabilidade de São Sebastião do Paraíso - FACEAC, and Universidade de Alfenas - UNIFENAS - São Sebastião do Paraíso.

- Municipal Human Development Index: 0.812 (2000)
- State ranking: 22 out of 853 municipalities as of 2000
- National ranking: 37 out of 5,138 municipalities as of 2000
- Literacy rate: 91%
- Life expectancy: 74 (average of males and females)

In 2000 the per capita monthly income of R$324.00 was above the state average of R$276.00 and above the national average of R$297.00. Poços de Caldas had the highest per capita monthly income in 2000 with R$435.00. The lowest was Setubinha with R$73.00.

The highest ranking municipality in Minas Gerais in 2000 was Poços de Caldas with 0.841, while the lowest was Setubinha with 0.568. Nationally the highest was São Caetano do Sul in São Paulo with 0.919, while the lowest was Setubinha. In more recent statistics (considering 5,507 municipalities) Manari in the state of Pernambuco has the lowest rating in the country—0,467—putting it in last place.

== Notable residents ==
- Evandro Amorim Barbosa, chess Grandmaster.
- Lima, brazilian football player.
- Anajá Caetano, writer

== See also ==
- List of municipalities in Minas Gerais
