= Jacob Philip Wingerter =

Jacob Philip Wingerter (1833 in Bavaria, Germany – March 11, 1916 in Cabo Verde, Brazil) was a Protestant colporteur evangelist who spent most of his life campaigning for the Presbyterian church in Brazil.

== Immigration to the U.S. ==
Jacob Philip Wingerter was born along the Rhine river in Bavaria in 1833, at a time when Germany was going through a severe economic crisis and many Germans were leaving for America. Around 1854, at age 21, Wingerter immigrated to the U.S.

Wingerter initially settled in Illinois, where he joined the Methodist Church. A few years later, he moved to New Orleans (Louisiana) in search of work. He was already serving as a Methodist evangelist by distributing leaflets on Sundays, and during the week when possible. After getting married and fathering two children, he moved with his family to Texas. But his family died by accidental poisoning.

When the Civil War broke out in 1861, Wingerter took a job as a telegrapher in the 28th Texas Cavalry Regiment of the Confederate Army. At war’s end, he lost his job. On July 4, 1865, he married Susan Harvey in Grimes County, Texas.

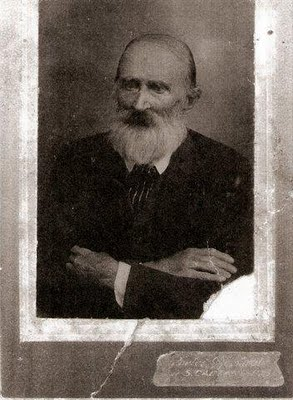
Jacob Philip Wingerter (1914)

Wingerter decided to migrate to Brazil in 1867 with a group of settlers led by former officers Frank McMullen and William Bowen. Of the approximately 130 people who made up this group, many were Confederate veterans and many traveled with their families. Wingerter accompanied his wife Susan and their daughter Amy.

== Immigration to Brazil ==
The emigrants sailed out of the port of Galveston, Texas aboard the old British ship Derby. They left the U.S. for a variety of reasons: to escape postwar poverty and violence, and to obtain fertile land in a new country. They had strong encouragement from the Brazilian government, as Brazil’s emperor Pedro II wanted to attract immigrants. Before the trip, McMullen and Bowen had traveled to Brazil and obtained land for their colony in São Paulo.

The Derby was shipwrecked and sank near Cuba. The migrants were rescued and taken aboard another ship to New York, facing strong storms that forced them to land in Virginia en route. After arriving in New York, they boarded the North America, heading back to Brazil. In May 1867, they arrived at Rio de Janeiro. Five days later, they boarded the Marion and sailed to Santos, São Paulo. From that city, Wingerter and pastor Ratcliff left for Santa Bárbara d'Oeste, while the others went to Iguape.

Wingerter's wife Susan died a few months after giving birth to her son Carlos. Sometime later, living with two small children in Santa Bárbara d'Oeste, Wingerter married his third wife, Anna Luisa Büchner, daughter of an immigrant family. They then moved to Campinas.

== The Evangelist ==
Upon arriving in Brazil, Wingerter devoted himself to evangelizing. In 1870, the physician and reverend Edward Lane, pastor of the first Presbyterian Church of Brazil, invited him to proselytize among settlers of German origin living in São Paulo. Wingerter joined the Mission of Nashville, organized in Brazil by Edward Lane and George Nash Morton to evangelize southern American Christians who had settled in the region of Campinas — besides seeking to convert Brazilians.

Wingerter moved to Mogi Mirim. When a Presbyterian church was organized there, he became one of its first presbyters.

For the Mission of Nashville, Wingerter distributed and sold religious tracts and bibles in Portuguese, English and German. According to a letter written by Edward Lane’s wife Sarah, Wingerter would leave copies of bibles in villages or neighborhoods and return six months or a year later, completing the sale of dozens of bibles. Sarah Lane described Wingerter as “humble, patient, earnest, self-denying, laborious, tireless, always happy and willing to move anywhere or do anything that the work of spreading the Gospel demanded.”

Helping spread Presbyterian gospel in Brazil, Wingerter was highly sought after by missionaries for his ability to interact with people of varied backgrounds. He traveled into the interior of São Paulo, Minas Gerais, Goiás and Mato Grosso, often accompanied by pastors such as John W. Dabney, Delfino Teixeira, and Miguel Torres. In August 1879, he traveled with reverend Dabney to the city of Cabo Verde and its surroundings. In his later years, Wingerter returned to live in Cabo Verde with his family. His youngest children were born there.

In 1879, reverend John Boyle, who had arrived in Brazil six years earlier and settled in Recife, moved to Mogi Mirim, where Wingerter was already living. Wingerter continued his intense outreach and proselytizing in Sao Paulo cities such as Casa Branca, Mococa, Ribeirão Preto, Batatais, Franca, and Santa Rita — and in Minas Gerais cities like Uberaba, Passos, Minas Gerais, Santa Rita de Cássia, Divisa Velha (currently Campos Gerais), and Ventania. Returning to Mogi Miriam with enthusiastic news about evangelizing opportunities in central Brazil, Wingerter encouraged Boyle to take the same route in 1881 and 1882, on a key mission to expand the church.

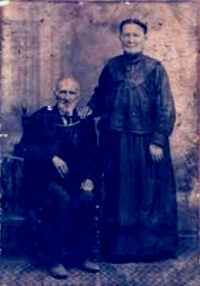
Anna and Jacob Wingerter

In 1883, Wingerter traveled to Paracatu, again giving an encouraging report on the people’s response to the Presbyterian gospel. The next year, he and Boyle preached in the Minas Gerais cities of Cabo Verde, Bagagem (currently Estrela do Sul), Araguari, and Paracatu — and the Goiás cities of Formosa and Santa Luzia de Goiás (currently Luziânia). In 1887, Boyle settled in Bagagem, striving to expand the Presbyterian church in that region and the state of Goiás. Boyle died suddenly at a young age in 1892; reverend Edward Lane also died that year.

In his final years, Wingerter worked for the American Bible Society. Colporteurs like Wingerter were pioneers of arduous terrain, where missionaries later harvested the fruits. They suffered persecution and affronts, but continued patiently sowing the Christian faith.

In the early 20th century, Wingerter, his wife and young children moved to Cabo Verde, where he lived until his death in 1916.

== Descendants ==
Wingerter had many children who survived him. His second wife, Susan Harvey, gave birth to Amy in Texas (around 1866); and Carlos in Iguape, in 1868 or 1869. His third wife, Anna Luisa Büchner, gave birth to John William in 1871 or 1872; Jonas; Carlota, born in Mogi Mirim in 1889; Luis Bruno, born in Mogi Mirim in 1891; Laura, born in Mogi Mirim in 1894; Felippe, born in Cabo Verde in 1907 or 1908; Lydia; and Guilhermina.

Many of his descendants continued his Christian faith, usually linked to the Presbyterian, Baptist, or Assemblies of God churches.

Among Wingerter’s descendants, the family surname has changed over the years: One can find variations like Wingester, Wingeter, Wingerther, Wingter and Wengerter. Jacob Philip Wingerter himself, in his many writings, altered his name to Jacó Felipe, Jacob Fellipe or just Fellipe.

There are other Wingerter families in Brazil, especially in the northeast and São Paulo — including descendants of another Jacob Wingerter who came to Brazil in the 20th century.

== See also ==
- Protestantism in Brazil
- Presbyterian Church of Brazil
- Americans in Brazil
