= Cabo Verde, Minas Gerais =

Municipality in Minas Gerais, Brazil

Coordinates: 21°28′19″S 46°23′45″W

- Municipality
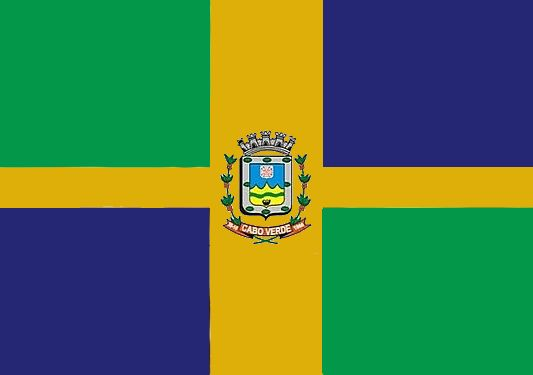
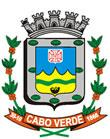
- Flag Coat of arms
- Interactive map of Cabo Verde, Minas Gerais
- Country: Brazil
- State: Minas Gerais
- Region: Southeast
- Time zone: UTC−3 (BRT)

Location of Cabo Verde on a map of the state of Minas Gerais

Cabo Verde is a Brazilian municipality located in the southwest of the state of Minas Gerais. Its population as of 2020 was 14,075 people living in a total area of 367 km^{2} (142 sq mi). The city belongs to the meso-region of Sul e Sudoeste de Minas and to the micro-region of São Sebastião do Paraíso. It became a municipality in 1877. The municipality is an important producer of coffee.

== Geography ==
The city center of Cabo Verde is located at an elevation of 927 meters a short distance from the state boundary of São Paulo. Neighboring municipalities are: Monte Belo (N), Areado (NE), Divisa Nova (E), Botelhos (S), Caconde (W) and Muzambinho (NW).

== History ==
The settlement began around a chapel dedicated to Nossa Senhora do Rosário do Cabo Verde in 1766. In 1877 it became a municipality.

== Communications ==
The municipality is served by three paved highways that connect with federal highway BR-146, which crosses the region.

- Main distances

Belo Horizonte: 465 km, Muzambinho: 25 km, Botelhos: 20 km, and Monte Belo: 33 km.

== Economic activities ==
Agriculture, with coffee production and dairy products, is the main economic activity. Coffee is the most important crop with an average of 160,000 bags produced. The GDP in 2005 was approximately R$102 million, with 4.5 million reais from taxes, 45 million reais from services, 4.5 million reais from industry, and 48 million reais from agriculture. The industrial sector employed 130 workers in 2005, while 395 were employed in commerce.

In the rural area there were 1,461 producers on 38,000 hectares of land. Approximately 9,000 persons were occupied in agriculture. The main crops are coffee, 10,500 hectares; and corn, 2,300 hectares. There were 20,000 head of cattle, of which 7,000 were milk cows (2006). Swine and poultry raising are also important in the local economy.

There was one bank (2007). In the vehicle fleet there were 1,823 automobiles, 163 trucks, 211 pickup trucks, 17 buses, and 425 motorcycles (2007).

== Health and education ==
In the health sector there were 4 health clinics and one hospital with 63 beds (2005). Educational needs of 2,600 students were attended to by 6 primary schools, 1 middle school, and 9 pre-primary schools.

- Municipal Human Development Index: 0.749 (2000)
- State ranking: 295 out of 853 municipalities as of 2000
- National ranking: 1,920 out of 5,138 municipalities as of 2000
- Literacy rate: 85%
- Life expectancy: 68 (average of males and females)

In 2000 the per capita monthly income of R$327.00 was above the state average of R$276.00 and above the national average of R$297.00. Poços de Caldas had the highest per capita monthly income in Minas Gerais 2000 with R$435.00. The lowest was the state was Setubinha with R$73.00.

The highest ranking municipality in Minas Gerais in 2000 was Poços de Caldas with 0.841, while the lowest was Setubinha with 0.568. Nationally the highest was São Caetano do Sul in São Paulo with 0.919, while the lowest was Setubinha. In more recent statistics (considering 5,507 municipalities) Manari in the state of Pernambuco has the lowest rating in the country—0,467—putting it in last place.

== Churches ==
The following churches are represented:

- Igreja Católica Apostólica Romana - with a temple in the Praça Principal, Bairro Chapadão, in the Bairros Coelhos, São Bartolomeu and the district of Serra dos Lemes.
- Igreja Presbiteriana - with churches in Rua Dr. Antônio de Souza Melo and in Distrito São Bartolomeu de Minas.
- Igreja Evangélica Assembléia de Deus - with churches in Rua Cel. Ernane Ornelas (Ministério Belém), Loteamento Assunção (Ministério Madureira) and Bairros Chapadão and São Bartolomeu.
- Igreja Batista - with a church in Bairro São Judas Tadeu.
- Igreja do Evangelho Quadrangular - with a church in Rua Álvaro Isac.
- Igreja Congregação Cristã no Brasil - with a church in Rua Tiradentes.
- Igreja Batista Nacional Unidos em Cristo - with a church in Rua Quintino Bocaiúva, 126 - Chapadão.
- Igreja Deus é Amor - Av. Nossa Senhora da Assunção.

== See also ==
- List of municipalities in Minas Gerais
