= Mário Américo =

Brazilian sports massage therapist

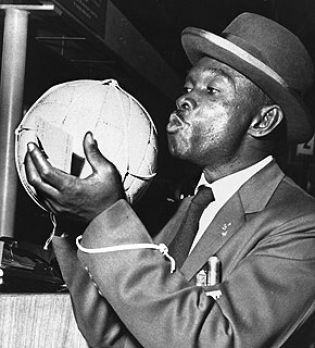
- Mario Américo in 1958
- Born: Mário Américo; July 28, 1912; Monte Santo de Minas, Minas Gerais, Brazil
- Died: April 9, 1990 (aged 77); São Paulo, Brazil
- Resting place: Chora Menino Cemetery, São Paulo, Brazil
- Citizenship: Brazilian
- Education: Federal University of Rio de Janeiro
- Occupations: Massage therapist physical educator politician boxer
- Organization: Brazil national football team
- Known for: Official massage therapist of the Brazil national football team at seven FIFA World Cups
- Title: City Councillor of São Paulo
- Term: 1977–1983
- Political party: Brazilian Democratic Movement (MDB)

Notes
- Served as the Brazilian national team's official massage therapist at seven FIFA World Cups (1950–1974), winning three titles (1958, 1962, and 1970).

Mário Américo (July 28, 1912 – April 9, 1990) was a Brazilian massage therapist, physical educator, and politician.

== Biography ==
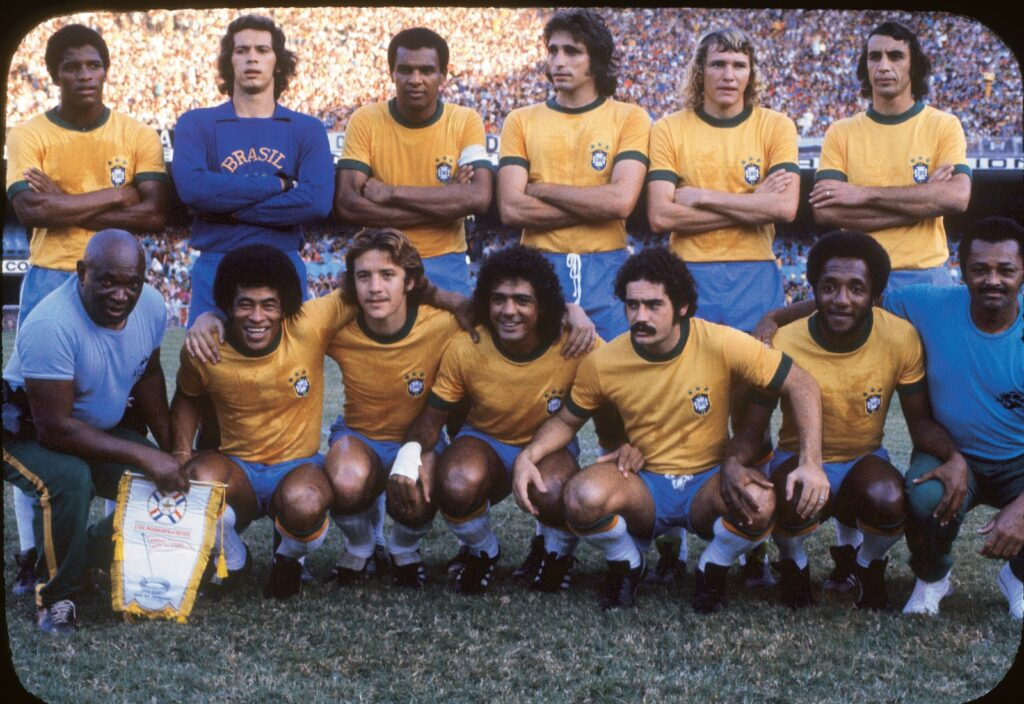
Mário Américo (crouching, first from the left) with the 1974 Brazilian National Team.

Mario was born on July 28, 1912, in Monte Santo de Minas, a town in the interior of Minas Gerais. Mário left home at the age of eight and took a train to São Paulo to work as a shoeshine boy. In São Paulo, he worked as a drummer for orchestras after working as a mechanic in the Bixiga neighborhood and taking music lessons through social programs, but he faced legal problems because he was a minor and worked at night in bohemian circles.

Leaving his brief artistic career behind, he discovered boxing at a gym on Ladeira da Memória Street in downtown São Paulo, where he was trained by Argentine coach Aristides Jofre, father of Brazilian boxer Éder Jofre, and competed in a few fights in Rio de Janeiro in the lightweight division. He moved to Rio de Janeiro, where he had a decade-long career as a boxer, competing in both amateur and professional bouts.

In 1942, he enrolled in the physical education program at the National School of Physical Education, now the Federal University of Rio de Janeiro (UFRJ). He went on to work as a massage therapist for several clubs in Rio de Janeiro, including Madureira and Vasco, and in São Paulo, Portuguesa.

As a member of the Brazilian national football team, he accompanied the team as its official massage therapist during seven FIFA World Cups, beginning with the 1950 FIFA World Cup in Brazil. He also served on the coaching staff for the 1954 FIFA World Cup, held in Switzerland and led by Zezé Moreira. At the 1958 FIFA World Cup, the first won by Brazil, held in Sweden, Américo worked once again as a masseur and secured the World Cup trophy. After Américo, when the final whistle blew, the referee was walking away with the ball under his arm. The national team's masseur punched the ball, grabbed it from the field, and ran off to the locker room. The ball is part of the collection at the Federação Paulista de Futebol (FPF) museum. At the 1962 FIFA World Cup in Chile, he repeated the feat and secured another ball for the Federation’s collection, in addition to playing a key role in the national team’s second consecutive World Cup title. He was also a member of the technical committee in 1966, at the tournament held in England. At the 1970 FIFA World Cup in Mexico, the Brazilian national team’s third victory, it marked the sixth World Cup in which Mario had participated. In 1974, at the FIFA World Cup held in West Germany, he participated in his seventh and final World Cup as a massage therapist for the Brazilian national team.

In the 1976 municipal election in São Paulo, he was elected city councilman as a member of the Brazilian Democratic Movement (MDB), an opposition party to the dictatorship, winning more than 31,000 votes. He ended his professional career by running a physical therapy clinic in the Imirim neighborhood, in the North Zone of São Paulo. A unit at a public health clinic in the same neighborhood was named after Mário. He was played by actor Val Perré in the Netflix series Brazil 70: The Third Star, which premiered in 2026.

=== Death ===
He died at the age of 77 in São Paulo, where he was hospitalized at Santa Isabel Hospital, in the Higienópolis neighborhood. His body was buried at Chora Menino Cemetery.

== Personal life ==
He had a collection of more than three thousand cups, which he kept in the places the teams visited.
