= Ibiraci =

Town and municipality in the state of Minas Gerais, Brazil

Coordinates: 20°27′43″S 47°07′19″W

- Municipality
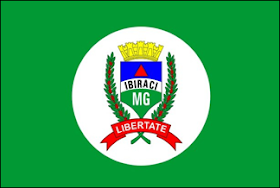
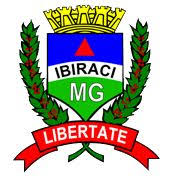
- Flag Coat of arms
- Interactive map of Ibiraci
- Country: Brazil
- State: Minas Gerais
- Region: Southeast
- Time zone: UTC−3 (BRT)

Location of Ibiraci on a map of the state of Minas Gerais

Ibiraci is a Brazilian municipality located in the southwest of the state of Minas Gerais. Its population as of 2020 was 13,986 people living in a total area of 598 km^{2} (231 sq mi). The city belongs to the meso-region of Sul e Sudoeste de Minas and to the micro-region of Passos. It became a municipality in 1923.

== Geography ==
The city center of Ibiraci is located at an elevation of 1,071 meters northwest of the regional center of Passos and northeast of Franca. Neighboring municipalities are: Sacramento and Delfinópolis (N), Cássia (E), Capetinga, Itirapuã, and Patrocínio Paulista (S), Franca and Claraval (W).

Distances

- Belo Horizonte: 358 km taking MG-050
- Franca: 32 km
- Cássia: 25 km
- Claraval: 25 km

The nearest airport with national flights is in Ribeirão Preto.

== Economic activities ==
Mining, services, small industries, and agriculture are the main economic activities. In 2005 338 workers were employed in 12 transformation industries. The GDP in 2005 was approximately R$280 million, with 44 million reais from taxes, 54 million reais from services, 152 million reais from industry, and 30 million reais from agriculture. There were 888 rural producers on 46,000 hectares of land. Approximately 5,800 persons were occupied in agriculture. The main crops are coffee (7,000 hectares), corn and soybeans. There were 23,000 head of cattle, of which 8,000 were milk cows (2006).

There is 1 bank (2007) In the vehicle fleet there were 1,820 automobiles, 324 trucks, 393 pickup trucks, 24 buses, and 329 motorcycles (2007).

== Health and education ==
In the health sector there were 6 health clinics and 1 hospital with 22 beds (2005). Educational needs of 2,550 students were attended to by 5 primary schools, 1 middle school, and 1 pre-primary school.

- Municipal Human Development Index: 0.762 (2000)
- State ranking: 204 out of 853 municipalities as of 2000
- National ranking: 1,539 out of 5,138 municipalities as of 2000
- Literacy rate: 84%
- Life expectancy: 72 (average of males and females)

In 2000 the per capita monthly income of R$246.00 was below the state average of R$276.00 and below the national average of R$297.00. Poços de Caldas had the highest per capita monthly income in 2000 with R$435.00. The lowest was Setubinha with R$73.00.

The highest ranking municipality in Minas Gerais in 2000 was Poços de Caldas with 0.841, while the lowest was Setubinha with 0.568. Nationally the highest was São Caetano do Sul in São Paulo with 0.919, while the lowest was Setubinha. In more recent statistics (considering 5,507 municipalities) Manari in the state of Pernambuco has the lowest rating in the country—0.467—putting it in last place.

== See also ==
- List of municipalities in Minas Gerais
