= Néria Lúcio Buzatto =

Brazilian lawyer and politician

Néria Lúcio Buzatto (born January 13, 1980, in Monte Santo de Minas) is a lawyer and politician of Brazil. She is affiliated with the Workers Party (Partido dos Trabalhadores) (PT). She was a councilor in Patrocinio Paulista, she served for 2 terms and is currently vice mayor of Patrocinio Paulista. She was the first woman to be elected vice mayor of Patrocinio Paulista and the first African-Brazilian to be councilor and mayor of this town. Her mandate was the year of 2007.

== Biography ==
Neria, was born to a humble evangelical family. Always very dedicated to his work in her Church, the Assembly of God in Patrocinio Paulista. She was married since 1998 with José Roberto Buzatto, mother of Lucas Buzatto. Shortly after marrying, Neria moved to São José do Rio Preto, but returned to Patrocinio Paulista shortly after. She held various positions in the church congregation since its beginning. She studied in Unifran, studying law, and becoming a lawyer after passing in the examination of the OAB.

== Political career ==
With the dream of becoming a politician, she sought a PMDB in 2004, for purposes of membership and possible application, however, the party has not shown interest in her, due to prejudices about her ability to win an election. By joining the PT, she was elected on the first application. In 2008 she was re-elected with a record vote, the Councilwoman most votes. In 2012, she ran for vice mayor, and was elected. She took office on January 1, 2013, being the first woman to be vice mayor and also the first African-Brazilian vice mayor in Patrocinio Paulista.
