= Fortaleza de Minas =

Town and municipality in the state of Minas Gerais, Brazil

Coordinates: 20°50′56″S 46°43′04″W

- Municipality
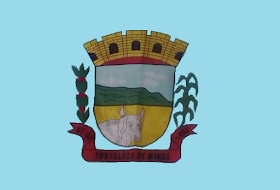
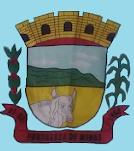
- Flag Coat of arms
- Interactive map of Fortaleza de Minas
- Country: Brazil
- State: Minas Gerais
- Region: Southeast
- Time zone: UTC−3 (BRT)

Location of Fortaleza de Minas on a map of the state of Minas Gerais

Fortaleza de Minas is a Brazilian municipality located in the southwest of the state of Minas Gerais. Its population as of 2020 was 4,437 people living in a total area of 218 km^{2} (84 sq mi). The city belongs to the meso-region of Sul e Sudoeste de Minas and to the micro-region of Passos. It became a municipality in 1963.

== Geography ==
The city center of Fortaleza de Minas is located at an elevation of 856 meters just south of the regional center of Passos. Neighboring municipalities are: Pratápolis (N and NW), Itaú de Minas (N), Passos (NE and E), Jacuí and Bom Jesus da Penha (S and SE), São Sebastião do Paraíso (W).

Distances

- Belo Horizonte: 358 km (222 mi) taking MG-050
- Jacuí: 22 km (14 mi) to the south
- Passos: 23 km (14 mi) to the north
- Ribeirão Preto: 145 km
- Brasília: 773 km
- São Paulo: 430 km

The nearest airport with national flights is in Ribeirão Preto.

== Tourism ==
Despite the small area there is a varied landscape with rugged hills, streams, and waterfalls. There are three modest hotels and four restaurants. The São João River is the main river. It has waterfalls, and large rock formations and is used for canoeing and kayaking. Cachoeira do Val is a beautiful waterfall located 4 km (2 mi) from the town. See Galeria de fotos for photos.

== Economic activities ==
Mining, services, small industries, and agriculture are the main economic activities. The economy is based on mineral extraction (nickel) and the sulfuric acid industry. There is one large enterprise, Mineração Serra da Fortaleza, of the Votorantim group. In 2005 501 workers were employed in this industry. The GDP in 2005 was approximately R$112 million, with 5 million reais from taxes, 25 million reais from services, 72 million reais from industry, and 9 million reais from agriculture. There were 521 rural producers on 18,000 hectares of land. Approximately 1,800 persons were occupied in agriculture. The main crops are coffee, bananas, sugarcane, rice, beans, and corn. There were 11,000 head of cattle, of which 3,000 were milk cows (2006).

There is 1 bank (2007) In the vehicle fleet there were 616 automobiles, 48 trucks, 53 pickup trucks, 4 buses, and 212 motorcycles (2007).

== Health and education ==
In the health sector there were three health clinics (2005). Educational needs of 850 students were attended to by two primary schools, one middle school, and one pre-primary school.

- Municipal Human Development Index: 0.765 (2000)
- State ranking: 191 out of 853 municipalities as of 2000
- National ranking: 1,458 out of 5,138 municipalities as of 2000
- Literacy rate: 85%
- Life expectancy: 74 (average of males and females)

In 2000 the per capita monthly income of R$192.00 was below the state average of R$276.00 and below the national average of R$297.00. Poços de Caldas had the highest per capita monthly income in 2000 with R$435.00. The lowest was Setubinha with R$73.00.

The highest ranking municipality in Minas Gerais in 2000 was Poços de Caldas with 0.841, while the lowest was Setubinha with 0.568. Nationally the highest was São Caetano do Sul in São Paulo with 0.919, while the lowest was Setubinha. In more recent statistics (considering 5,507 municipalities) Manari in the state of Pernambuco has the lowest rating in the country—0,467—putting it in last place.

== See also ==
- List of municipalities in Minas Gerais
