= Wingerter =

Wingerter is a German surname. Notable people with the surname include:

- Benjamin Wingerter (born 1983), German footballer
- George Wingerter (1904–1994), American racing driver
- Jacob Philip Wingerter (1833–1916), German Protestant evangelist and presbyter
