= Bom Jesus da Penha =

Brazilian municipality located in the southwest of the state of Minas Gerais

Coordinates: 21°01′01″S 46°31′22″W

- Municipality
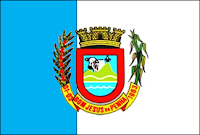
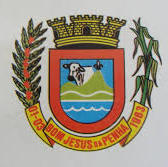
- Flag Coat of arms
- Interactive map of Bom Jesus da Penha
- Country: Brazil
- State: Minas Gerais
- Region: Southeast
- Time zone: UTC−3 (BRT)

Location of Bom Jesus da Penha on a map of the state of Minas Gerais

Bom Jesus da Penha is a Brazilian municipality located in the southwest of the state of Minas Gerais. Its population as of 2020 was 4,244 people living in a total area of 209 km^{2} (81 sq mi). The city belongs to the mesoregion of Sul e Sudoeste de Minas and to the micro-region of Passos. It became a municipality in 1963.

== Geography ==
The city center of Bom Jesus da Penha is located at an elevation of 900 meters southeast of Passos and west of the Furnas reservoir. Neighboring municipalities are: Passos (N), Alpinópolis (NE), Nova Resende (E), São Pedro da União, and Jacuí (W).

Distances

- Belo Horizonte: 352 km
- Alpinópolis: 22 km to the northeast
- Passos: 65 km (north on MG-446 for 35 km, then west on MG-050 for 26 km)

== Economic activities ==
The economy is based on services and agriculture, especially cattle raising for dairy production. The GDP in 2005 was approximately R$42 million, with 14 million reais from services, 1 million reais from industry, and 25 million reais from agriculture. There were 503 rural producers on 19,000 hectares of land. 160 farms had tractors (2006). Approximately 1500 persons were occupied in agriculture. The main crops are coffee, soybeans, and corn. There were 10,000 head of cattle, of which 4,000 were milk cows (2006).

There was one bank (2007). In the vehicle fleet there were 618 automobiles, 92 trucks, 105 pickup trucks, 6 buses, and 514 motorcycles (2007).

== Health and education ==
In the health sector there were 3 health establishments: 2 public clinics and 1 private hospital with 20 beds (2005). Patients with more serious health conditions are transported to Passos. Educational needs of 850 students were met by 2 primary schools, 1 middle school, and 1 pre-primary school.

- Municipal Human Development Index: 0.776 (2000)
- State ranking: 132 out of 853 municipalities as of 2000
- National ranking: 1159 out of 5,138 municipalities as of 2000
- Literacy rate: 87%
- Life expectancy: 72 (average of males and females)

In 2000 the per capita monthly income of R$291.00 was above the state average of R$276.00 and below the national average of R$297.00. Poços de Caldas had the highest per capita monthly income in 2000 with R$435.00. The lowest was Setubinha with R$73.00.

The highest ranking municipality in Minas Gerais in 2000 was Poços de Caldas with 0.841, while the lowest was Setubinha with 0.568. Nationally the highest was São Caetano do Sul in São Paulo with 0.919, while the lowest was Setubinha. In more recent statistics (considering 5,507 municipalities) Manari in the state of Pernambuco has the lowest rating in the country—0,467—putting it in last place.

== See also ==
- List of municipalities in Minas Gerais
