= Itaú de Minas =

Brazilian municipality in the state of Minas Gerais

Coordinates: 20°44′20″S 46°45′07″W

- Municipality
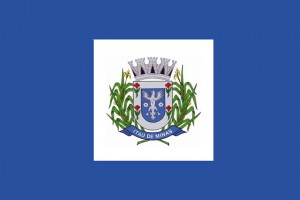
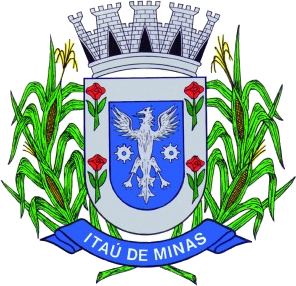
- Flag Coat of arms
- Interactive map of Itaú de Minas
- Country: Brazil
- State: Minas Gerais
- Region: Southeast
- Time zone: UTC−3 (BRT)

Location of Itaú de Minas on a map of the state of Minas Gerais

Itaú de Minas is a Brazilian municipality located in the center of the state of Minas Gerais. Its population as of 2020 was 16,199 people living in a total area of 154 km^{2}. The city belongs to the meso-region of Sul e Sudoeste de Minas and to the micro-region of Passos. It became a municipality in 1987.

== Geography ==
The city center of Itaú de Minas is located at an elevation of 735 meters a short distance west of regional center Passos. Neighboring municipalities are: Passos (N and E), Fortaleza de Minas (S), Pratápolis (SW), and Cássia (W).

Distances

- Belo Horizonte: 356 km
- Cássia: 31 km
- Passos: 21 km
- São Sebastião do Paraíso: 34 km

== Economic activities ==
Services, industry, and agriculture are the main economic activities. The city has a cement factory: CCPI - Companhia de Cimento Portland Itaú. The GDP in 2005 was approximately R$226 million, with 56 million reais from taxes, 76 million reais from services, 89 million reais from industry, and 4 million reais from agriculture. In the industrial sector there were 110 small industries employing 994 workers (2005). There were 89 rural producers on 9,000 hectares of land. Approximately 220 persons were occupied in agriculture. The main crops are coffee, beans, and corn. There were 7,000 head of cattle, of which 2,000 were milk cows (2006).

There are 4 banks (2007). In the vehicle fleet there were 2,902 automobiles, 231 trucks, 210 pickup trucks, 29 buses, and 606 motorcycles (2007).

== Health and education ==
In the health sector there were 8 health clinics and 1 hospital with 44 beds (2005). Educational needs of 2,300 students were attended to by 7 primary schools, 2 middle schools, and 5 pre-primary schools.

- Municipal Human Development Index: 0.796 (2000)
- State ranking: 51 out of 853 municipalities as of 2000
- National ranking: 633 out of 5,138 municipalities as of 2000
- Literacy rate: 93%
- Life expectancy: 71 (average of males and females)

In 2000 the per capita monthly income of R$264.00 was below the state average of R$276.00 and below the national average of R$297.00. Poços de Caldas had the highest per capita monthly income in 2000 with R$435.00. The lowest was Setubinha with R$73.00.

The highest ranking municipality in Minas Gerais in 2000 was Poços de Caldas with 0.841, while the lowest was Setubinha with 0.568. Nationally the highest was São Caetano do Sul in São Paulo with 0.919, while the lowest was Setubinha. In more recent statistics (considering 5,507 municipalities) Manari in the state of Pernambuco has the lowest rating in the country—0,467—putting it in last place.

== See also ==
- List of municipalities in Minas Gerais
