= São João Batista do Glória =

Brazilian municipality located in the southwest of the state of Minas Gerais

Coordinates: 20°38′27″S 46°30′21″W

- Municipality
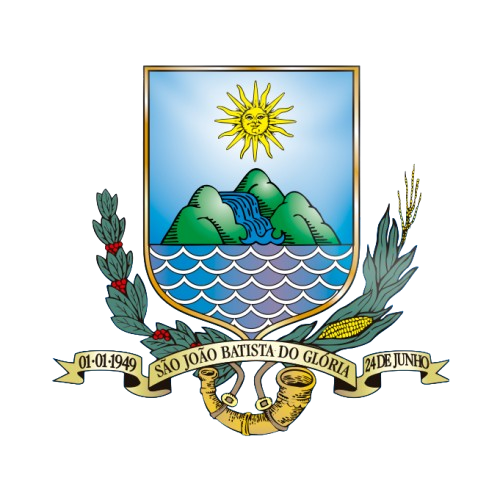
- Coat of arms
- Interactive map of São João Batista do Glória
- Country: Brazil
- State: Minas Gerais
- Region: Southeast
- Time zone: UTC−3 (BRT)

Location of São João Batista do Glória on a map of the state of Minas Gerais

São João Batista do Glória is a Brazilian municipality located in the southwest of the state of Minas Gerais. Its population as of 2020 was 7,498 people living in a total area of 553 km^{2}. The city belongs to the meso-region of Sul e Sudoeste de Minas and to the micro-region of Passos. It became a municipality in 1948.

== Geography ==
The city center of São João Batista do Glória is located at an elevation of 695 meters in the valley of the Rio Grande, a short distance northeast of regional center, Passos. Neighboring municipalities are: Vargem Bonita (77 km north), Capitólio (65 km east), São José da Barra (40 km southeast), Alpinópolis (33 km south), Passos (14 km south and southwest), Delfinópolis (70 km west). The terrain is hilly and there are many waterfalls in the streams. In the higher elevations there are still armadillos, guará wolves, rheas, and toucans.

Distances

- Belo Horizonte: 324 km
- Brasília - 800 km
- Franca: 130 km
- Uberaba: 230 km
- Ribeirão Preto: 180 km
- Campinas: 315 km
- Passos: 14 km on MG-146
- Furnas Dam: 18 km

== Economic activities ==
Services, industries, and agriculture are the main economic activities. There are brickworks and factories producing spirits. The GDP in 2005 was approximately R$449 million, with 82 million reais from taxes, 37 million reais from services, 301 million reais from industry, and 32 million reais from agriculture. The biggest employer was public administration with 410 workers in 2005. In the rural area there were 236 producers on 26,000 hectares of land. Approximately 600 persons were occupied in agriculture. The main crops are coffee, beans, and corn. There were 25,000 head of cattle, of which 9,000 were milk cows (2006).

There were no banks (2007). In the vehicle fleet there were 787 automobiles, 69 trucks, 66 pickup trucks, 10 buses, and 663 motorcycles (2007).

== Health and education ==
In the health sector there were 5 health clinics and 1 hospital with 25 beds (2005). Educational needs of 1,550 students were attended to by 3 primary schools, 1 middle school, and 1 pre-primary school.

- Municipal Human Development Index: 0.770 (2000)
- State ranking: 165 out of 853 municipalities as of 2000
- National ranking: 1321 out of 5,138 municipalities as of 2000
- Literacy rate: 86%
- Life expectancy: 73 (average of males and females)

In 2000 the per capita monthly income of R$240.00 was below the state average of R$276.00 and below the national average of R$297.00. Poços de Caldas had the highest per capita monthly income in 2000 with R$435.00. The lowest was Setubinha with R$73.00.

The highest ranking municipality in Minas Gerais in 2000 was Poços de Caldas with 0.841, while the lowest was Setubinha with 0.568. Nationally the highest was São Caetano do Sul in São Paulo with 0.919, while the lowest was Setubinha. In more recent statistics (considering 5,507 municipalities) Manari in the state of Pernambuco has the lowest rating in the country—0,467—putting it in last place.

== See also ==
- List of municipalities in Minas Gerais
