= Claraval =

Brazilian municipality

Coordinates: 20°23′56″S 47°16′01″W

- Municipality
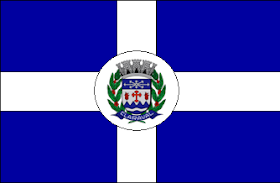
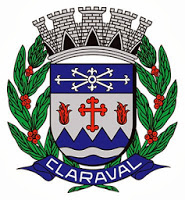
- Flag Coat of arms
- Interactive map of Claraval
- Country: Brazil
- State: Minas Gerais
- Region: Southeast
- Time zone: UTC−3 (BRT)

Claraval is a Brazilian municipality located in the southwest of the state of Minas Gerais.

Location of Claraval on a map of the state of Minas Gerais

Its population as of 2020 was 4,853 people living in a total area of 210 km². The city belongs to the meso-region of Sul e Sudoeste de Minas and to the micro-region of Passos. It became a municipality in 1953.

== History ==
Founded as District of Garimpo das Canoas, belonging to the municipality of Ibiraci, it was elevated to the category of municipality in 1953, with the new name of Claraval.

The origin of the toponym was an homage (Claraval being the Portuguese for Clairvaux) paid to Saint Bernard of Clairvaux, Prior of the French mother house of the Cistercians, since the year of the administrative emancipation of the town coincided with the eight hundredth anniversary of the saint's death.

From 1968 to 2006 it also had the Territorial Abbacy of Claraval, on canonical territory split off from and later returned to the Roman Catholic Diocese of Guaxupé.

== Geography ==
The city center of Claraval is located at an elevation of 745 meters in a fertile region on the state boundary with São Paulo. The Canoas river forms the boundary.

Neighboring municipalities are: Ibiraci (NE, E, and SE; 25 km southeast on MG-344), Franca (25 km SW), Cristais Paulista (W) and Pedregulho (NW).

Nearby cities:

- Belo Horizonte: 440 km (south on MG-344, then east on MG-050)
- Passos: 110 km (southeast on MG-344 then east on MG-050)

== Economic activities ==
Services and agriculture are the main economic activities. The GDP in 2005 was approximately R$35 million, with 2 million reais from taxes, 18 million reais from services, 5 million reais from industry and 9 million reais from agriculture. There were 557 rural producers on 18,000 hectares of land. Approximately 1,600 persons were occupied in agriculture. The main crops are coffee, bananas, sugarcane, rice, beans and corn. There were 9,000 head of cattle, of which 4,000 were milk cows (2006).

There is 1 bank (2007)

In the vehicle fleet there were 945 automobiles, 157 trucks, 156 pickup trucks, 33 buses, and 341 motorcycles (2007).

== Health and education ==
In the health sector there were 2 health clinics (2005). Educational needs of 1,100 students were attended to by 5 primary schools, 1 middle school and 5 pre-primary schools.

- Municipal Human Development Index: 0.740 (2000)
- State ranking: 354 out of 853 municipalities as of 2000
- National ranking: 2,156 out of 5,138 municipalities as of 2000
- Literacy rate: 86%
- Life expectancy: 71 (average of males and females)

In 2000 the per capita monthly income of R$191.00 was below the state average of R$276.00 and below the national average of R$297.00. Poços de Caldas had the highest per capita monthly income in 2000 with R$435.00. The lowest was Setubinha with R$73.00.

The highest ranking municipality in Minas Gerais in 2000 was Poços de Caldas with 0.841, while the lowest was Setubinha with 0.568. Nationally the highest was São Caetano do Sul in São Paulo with 0.919, while the lowest was Setubinha. In more recent statistics (considering 5,507 municipalities) Manari in the state of Pernambuco has the lowest rating in the country—0,467—putting it in last place.

== See also ==
- List of municipalities in Minas Gerais
