= São José da Barra =

Brazilian municipality located in the southwest of the state of Minas Gerais

Coordinates: 20°43′04″S 46°18′39″W

- Municipality
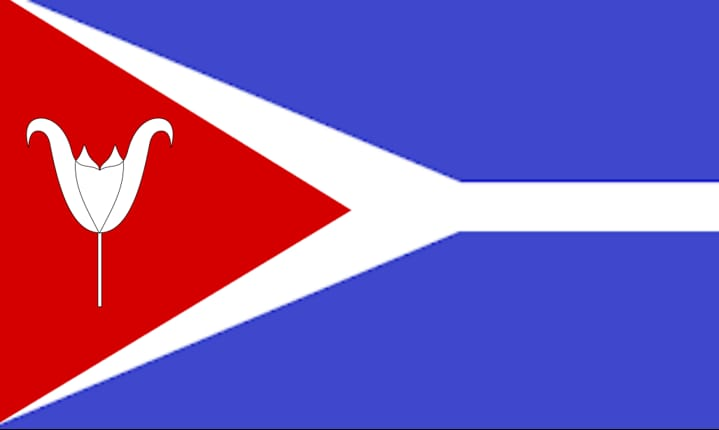
- Flag
- Interactive map of São José da Barra
- Country: Brazil
- State: Minas Gerais
- Region: Southeast
- Time zone: UTC−3 (BRT)

Location of São José da Barra on a map of the state of Minas Gerais

São José da Barra is a Brazilian municipality located in the southwest of the state of Minas Gerais. Its population as of 2020 was 7,480 people living in a total area of 312 km^{2}. The city belongs to the meso-region of Sul e Sudoeste de Minas and to the micro-region of Passos. It became a municipality in 1948. The important hydroelectric plant of Furnas is located here.

== Geography ==
The city center of São José da Barra is located at an elevation of 695 meters in the valley of the Rio Grande, a short distance northeast of regional center, Passos. Neighboring municipalities are: São João Batista do Glória and Capitólio (N), Guapé (E), Carmo do Rio Claro (SE), Alpinópolis (S), and Passos (W).

Distances

- Belo Horizonte: 320 km
- Piumhi: 63 km
- Passos: 26 km
- Alpinópolis: 17 km

== History ==
The city is also known as Nova Barra since it used to lie on the banks of the Rio Grande, where that river was joined by the Rio Sapucaí. When Furnas was built this old settlement was flooded and a new one was built.

== Economic activities ==
Services, energy production from the Furnas dam, and agriculture are the main economic activities. The GDP in 2005 was approximately R$434 million, with 82 million reais from taxes, 33 million reais from services, 300 million reais from industry, and 18 million reais from agriculture. The biggest employer was energy production with 250 workers in 2005. In the rural area there were 204 producers on 16,000 hectares of land. Approximately 1400 persons were occupied in agriculture. The main crops are coffee, beans, and corn. There were 9,000 head of cattle, of which 3,500 were milk cows (2006). The poultry industry is substantial.

There were 2 banks (2007). In the vehicle fleet there were 782 automobiles, 69 trucks, 82 pickup trucks, 24 buses, and 220 motorcycles (2007).

== Health and education ==
In the health sector there were 5 health clinics (2005). Educational needs of 1,670 students were attended to by 5 primary schools, 2 middle schools, and 4 pre-primary schools.

- Municipal Human Development Index: 0.793 (2000)
- State ranking: 64 out of 853 municipalities as of 2000
- National ranking: 735 out of 5,138 municipalities as of 2000
- Literacy rate: 90%
- Life expectancy: 74 (average of males and females)

In 2000 the per capita monthly income of R$278.00 was above the state average of R$276.00 and below the national average of R$297.00. Poços de Caldas had the highest per capita monthly income in 2000 with R$435.00. The lowest was Setubinha with R$73.00.

The highest ranking municipality in Minas Gerais in 2000 was Poços de Caldas with 0.841, while the lowest was Setubinha with 0.568. Nationally the highest was São Caetano do Sul in São Paulo with 0.919, while the lowest was Setubinha. In more recent statistics (considering 5,507 municipalities) Manari in the state of Pernambuco has the lowest rating in the country—0,467—putting it in last place.

== See also ==
- List of municipalities in Minas Gerais
