= Cemitério Municipal de Santana =

Cemetery Santana, São Paulo, Brazil

Municipal Cemetery of Santana
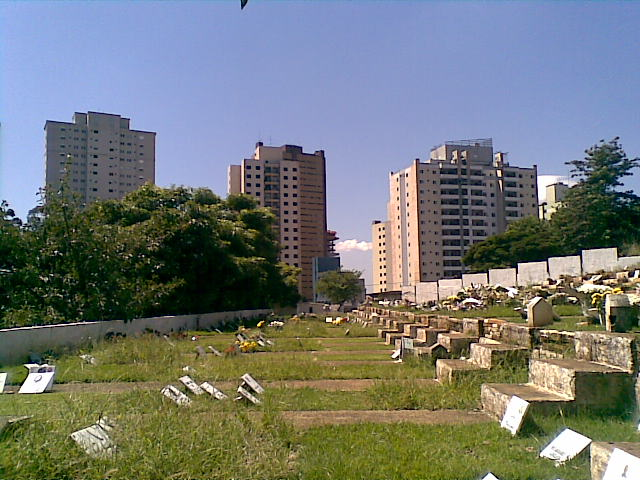
- Cemitério Municipal de Santana in São Paulo

Details
- Established: 1897
- Location: Santana, São Paulo
- Country: Brazil
- Coordinates: 23°29′48″S 46°38′20″W
- Size: 41,000m²
- No. of graves: 12,000

The Cemitério Municipal de Santana (Municipal Cemetery of Santana), popularly known as Chora Menino (English: cry boy), is a cemetery located in the northeastern zone of São Paulo in the district of Santana, and is one of the oldest cemeteries in Brazil.

It was officially recognized as a cemetery in 1897 and has an area of 38,485m². The local Jewish community used the location as a cemetery until 1970 known as Cemitério Israelita de Santana.

The name Chora Menino comes from a local tale about a woman who is said to have lived in the region who threw abandoned newborn babies into the valley alongside the cemetery for vultures to eat.

The cemetery is located on the Rua Nova dos Portugueses in the Imirim neighborhood.
