= Jorge Falleiros =

Brazilian poet, professor and journalist

Jorge Falleiros (Patrocínio Paulista, November 3, 1898 – São José dos Campos, November 19, 1924) was a poet, teacher and journalist Brazilian features the second generation Romantic.

== Life and work context ==
Still small, at age seven, Jorge Falleiros, along with their parents, moving from Patrocinio do Sapucay, today Patrocinio Paulista to Ituverava. Therefore, Silveira Bueno (1989, p. 15), mistakenly writes in the preface to Nirvana, which Falleiros Jorge was born in Ituverava. In youth, Jorge is sent to Batatais, where he entered the diocesan seminary, with a strong desire to become a priest. Writes there, his first verses discovering his talent for poetry. Also in Batatais, feel the first symptoms of tuberculosis. Batatais, is transferred to the Episcopal Seminary Pirapora, where he met two great friends, Silveira Bueno and Castro Nery (that would be the one to follow priestly career). So Falleiros abandons the seminar, realizing that this was not his vocation. Abandons his cassock, the seminarians and priests of that era back to life and used profane, but not finding peace and happiness which he sought. After leaving the seminary, Engaged in the teaching and journalism. Makes plans and imagines books that never came to be published, with the exception of Nirvana, published a year after his death. Comments Brasil Bradeschi (1985): "something was no longer within reach of his hand, an impossible love, these old times. In sonnet Autobiography, glimpsed something of this love. In the preface to Nirvana, Silveira Bueno writes that met Jorge Falleiros young hilarious and communicative, full of life and plans that would be destroyed by his illness. Because of this illness, moving away from the world and cling to religion, hoping to find healing for both tuberculosis and for their emotional illness resulting from the tuberculosis. In November 1924 goes through São José dos Campos in search of healing, but meets death. In 1925, wrote Silveira Bueno:

The existence of the seminary has completely transformed the personality of Jorge Falleiros. Servant entered, admiring life, loving the sun, challenging the fight scathing in full bloom, in full joy and skirt, wrinkled, impenetrable, poet extremely embittered, afraid of the fight, idolatrous death.

— Almanac History Patrocinio Paulista, p. 112

It is the very Silveira Bueno (1989, p.17) who confirms the change in the poet: "The seminary life, went to Jorge, the beginning of his intellectual and physical ruin." According to him, Jorge Falleiros lost his health in the seminary and was suffocated by pessimism, also lived inner conflict: the indecision between the priesthood and the world, between the workshop and home. And then the bitterness took altogether Jorge Falleiros. The work of Jorge Falleiros, Nirvana, which had been long forgotten, here is rescued today as one of the most beautiful and important works endowed with romance. The poet can not be elevated to the category of the poet Brazilian romanticism alongside Gonçalves de Magalhães, Gonçalves Dias, Alvares de Azevedo, Casimiro de Abreu, Junqueira Freire, Fagundes Varela and Castro Alves, but it is undeniable its romance and his preference for romantic literary aesthetics in the design of his poetry. So Jorge Falleiros, despite not having lived the second generation romantic, has strong characteristics of this phase of Romanticism.

== Bibliography ==
- Beloti, Jovano R.; Daniel, Thais B. Características Românticas em Jorge Falleiros. Batatais: Claretiano, 2012. (Text of the article above almost full authorized by the authors)
- Bueno, Silveira. Prefácio. In: Falleiros, Jorge. Nirvana e Poemas inéditos. 2nd ed. Patrocínio Paulista: Governo Municipal, 1990.
- Falleiros, Jorge. Nirvana e Poemas inéditos. 2nd ed. Patrocínio Paulista: Governo Municipal, 1990.
- Matos, Carlos Alberto Bastos; Costa, Alfredo Henrique Paulista. Almanaque Histórico de Patrocínio Paulista. Secretaria de Estado e Caixa Econômica do estado de São Paulo, 1985, p. 111–117
- Vioto, Lidiane das Graças M.; Nascimento, Luciana Paula F. do. A intertextualidade nos poemas de Alvares de Azevedo e Jorge Falleiros. Batatais: Claretiano, 2001.

Portuguese translation: Google Translator
