= Anajá Caetano =

Afro-Brazilian writer

- Born: São Sebastião do Paraíso, Brazil
- Notable work: Negra Efigênia, paixão do senhor branco (1966)

Anajá Caetano was an Afro-Brazilian writer who wrote about slavery, religion and discrimination. Caetano was the first woman to write a novel in 20th-century Brazil.

== Biography ==
Caetano was born in São Sebastião do Paraíso in Brazil. She was of Angolan descent, specifically of the Chokwe people.

Caetano wrote about Afro-Brazilians, including slavery, religion and discrimination.

Her book Negra Efigênia, paixão do senhor branco (OCLC 253500853) was published in 1966. It was the first novel written and published by a woman in Brazil in the 20th century. The novel, set in the 19th century, examines the life of Iphigenia, an enslaved woman who is kidnapped by a white farmer to be his wife.
