= São Sebastião do Paraíso Biological Reserve =

- Reserva Biológica Estadual de São Sebastião do Paraíso
- IUCN category Ia (strict nature reserve)
- Location within Brazil
- Nearest city: São Sebastião do Paraíso
- Coordinates: 20°54′47″S 47°06′58″W
- Area: 248 hectares (610 acres)
- Designation: Biological reserve
- Created: 23 September 1974
- Administrator: IEF Minas Gerais

São Sebastião do Paraíso Biological Reserve (Portuguese: Reserva Biológica Estadual de São Sebastião do Paraíso) is a state biological reserve in the state of Minas Gerais, Brazil.

== Location ==
The São Sebastião do Paraíso Biological Reserve was created by law nº 16.580 of 23 September 1974 and is administered by the State Forestry Institute (IEF). It covers an area of 248 hectares (610 acres). The reserve is the only one in the municipality of São Sebastião do Paraíso, which was once covered in extensive forests that were indiscriminately cleared in the later part of the 20th century.

== Sources ==
- Camargos, Regina M. F.; Torrent Lanna, Mônica, "CADASTRO DAS ÁREAS NATURAIS PROTEGIDAS EM MINAS GERAIS" (PDF), Geonomos, 4 (2)
- "São Sebastião do Paraíso: Vegetação", City Brazil (in Portuguese)
