= Delfinópolis =

Brazilian municipality located in the southwest of the state of Minas Gerais

Coordinates: 20°20′38″S 46°51′14″W

- Municipality
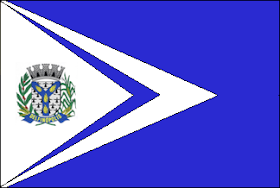
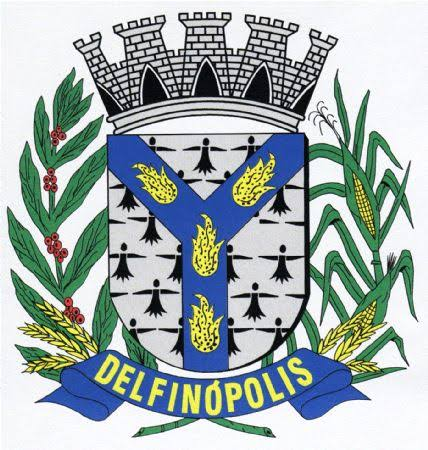
- Flag Coat of arms
- Interactive map of Delfinópolis
- Country: Brazil
- State: Minas Gerais
- Region: Southeast
- Time zone: UTC−3 (BRT)

Location of Delfinópolis on a map of the state of Minas Gerais

Delfinópolis is a Brazilian municipality located in the southwest of the state of Minas Gerais. Its population as of 2020 was 7,131 people living in a total area of 1,375 km^{2}. The city belongs to the meso-region of Sul e Sudoeste de Minas and to the micro-region of Passos. It became a municipality in 1948.

== Geography ==
The city center of Delfinópolis is located at an elevation of 745 meters on the northern bank of the Represa dos Peixotos, which dams up the Rio Grande. The elevation varies from a maximum of 1,400 meters to a minimum of 671 meters. Neighboring municipalities are: São Roque de Minas (N), São João Batista do Glória (E), Passos and Cássia (S), Ibiraci (SW), and Sacramento (W).

Distances

- Belo Horizonte: 420 km
- Franca: 88 km
- Passos: 75 km
- Ribeirão Preto: 180 km
- Rio de Janeiro: 848 km
- Brasília: 747 km

The nearest airport with national flights is in Ribeirão Preto.

== Tourism ==
The reservoir of Peixotos offers nautical sports and fishing, while the municipality has more than 150 waterfalls, most of which are located on rural properties. There are 3 hotels: Hotel Estância Girasol, Hotel Jp, and Hotel Skalla. There are 34 pousadas, a type of hotel, and 2 camping grounds.

== Economic activities ==
Services, tourism, small industries, and agriculture are the main economic activities. The GDP in 2005 was approximately R$246 million, with 41 million reais from taxes, 30 million reais from services, 147 million reais from industry, and 27 million reais from agriculture. There were 483 rural producers on 62,000 hectares of land. Approximately 1,100 persons were occupied in agriculture. The main crops are coffee, bananas, sugarcane, rice, beans, and corn. There were 31,000 head of cattle, of which 10,000 were milk cows (2006).

There is 1 bank (2007)

In the vehicle fleet there were 729 automobiles, 66 trucks, 110 pickup trucks, 8 buses, and 184 motorcycles (2007).

== Health and education ==
In the health sector there were 7 health clinics and 1 private hospital with 19 beds (2005). Educational needs of 1,450 students were attended to by 6 primary schools, 1 middle school, and 3 pre-primary schools.

- Municipal Human Development Index: 0.752 (2000)
- State ranking: 267 out of 853 municipalities as of 2000
- National ranking: 1,826 out of 5,138 municipalities as of 2000
- Literacy rate: 83%
- Life expectancy: 72 (average of males and females)

In 2000 the per capita monthly income of R$208.00 was below the state average of R$276.00 and below the national average of R$297.00. Poços de Caldas had the highest per capita monthly income in 2000 with R$435.00. The lowest was Setubinha with R$73.00.

The highest ranking municipality in Minas Gerais in 2000 was Poços de Caldas with 0.841, while the lowest was Setubinha with 0.568. Nationally the highest was São Caetano do Sul in São Paulo with 0.919, while the lowest was Setubinha. In more recent statistics (considering 5,507 municipalities) Manari in the state of Pernambuco has the lowest rating in the country—0,467—putting it in last place.

== See also ==
- List of municipalities in Minas Gerais
