= Carmo do Rio Claro =

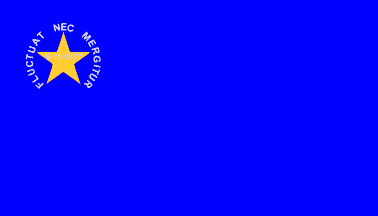
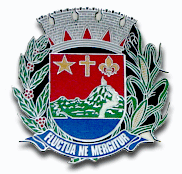
- Flag Coat of arms
- Nickname: Carmo
- Motto: Fluctuat, nec mergitur
- Location in Southwest Minas Gerais

- Location within Brazil
- Coordinates: 20°58′23″S 46°07′08″W
- Country: Brazil
- Region: Southeast
- State: Minas Gerais

Government
  - Mayor: Maria Aparecida Vilela

Area
  - Total: 1,064.790 km^{2} (411.118 sq mi)
- Elevation: 785 m (2,575 ft)

Population (2020)
  - Total: 21,268
  - Density: 20.1/km^{2} (52/sq mi)
- Time zone: UTC−3 (BRT)
- Website: www.carmodorioclaro.mg.gov.br

Carmo do Rio Claro is a municipality located in the south-west of Minas Gerais state, Brazil. The distance to the state capital, Belo Horizonte is 374 km.

The characteristic vegetation of the municipality is cerrado but there is still some gallery forest along the rivers.

The climate of the municipality is classified as subtropical mesothermic, characterized by dry winters and wet summers. The average temperature in winter is approximately 16 °C and the average of the hottest month is about 27 °C. The period between December and February is the rainiest. The driest months are from April to September.

Carmo do Rio Claro is watered by the Furnas Dam. Local economy is driven by agriculture, tourism and handcraft.

Largely known by its handcraft in hand loom and its production of handcrafted candy.

Carmo do Rio Claro is part of the Guaxupé diocese.

== History and economy ==
It is believed that the initial core of the town occurred during the Bandeiras with José Barbosa de Arruda and Domingos Ferreira de Avelar, reminiscents of the Lourenço Castanho bandeira's, known for having expulsed the natives Cataguases from the region of Tamanduá (Itapecerica).

Initially with the help of locals, José Joaquim Santana, built in his lands a small chapel in the place where today is the main church Igreja Matriz de Carmo do Rio Claro. The freguesia de Nossa Senhora do Carmo do Monte do Rio Claro was created in 1810, in the lands inside the Princess Campaign area, to be later, 1814, included to the Jacuí municipality.

The fertility of its lands propitiated the development of great farms, economic basis of the town, which in 1848 started to be part of Passos.

The emancipation happened in 1875.

== See also ==
- List of municipalities in Minas Gerais
