= Alpinópolis =

Brazilian municipality

Coordinates: 20°51′50″S 46°23′16″W

- Municipality
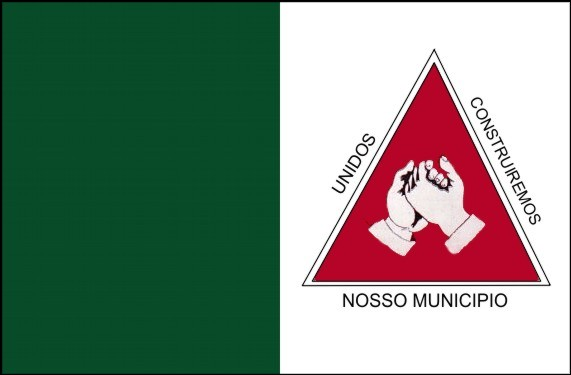
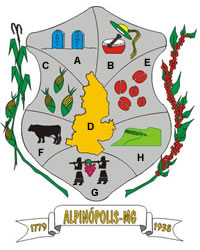
- Flag Coat of arms
- Interactive map of Alpinópolis
- Country: Brazil
- State: Minas Gerais
- Region: Southeast
- Time zone: UTC−3 (BRT)

Location of Alpinópolis on a map of the state of Minas Gerais

Alpinópolis is a Brazilian municipality located in the southwest of the state of Minas Gerais. As of 2020, its population was 19,958 people and its area was of 458 km^{2}. The city is located in the micro-region of Passos. It became a municipality in 1938.

== Name and history ==
Founded as the village of São Sebastião da Ventania, it had its name later shortened to Ventania. In 1914, the name was officially changed to the current one: Alpinopolis. After so many years, Ventania still is the name used by its inhabitants.

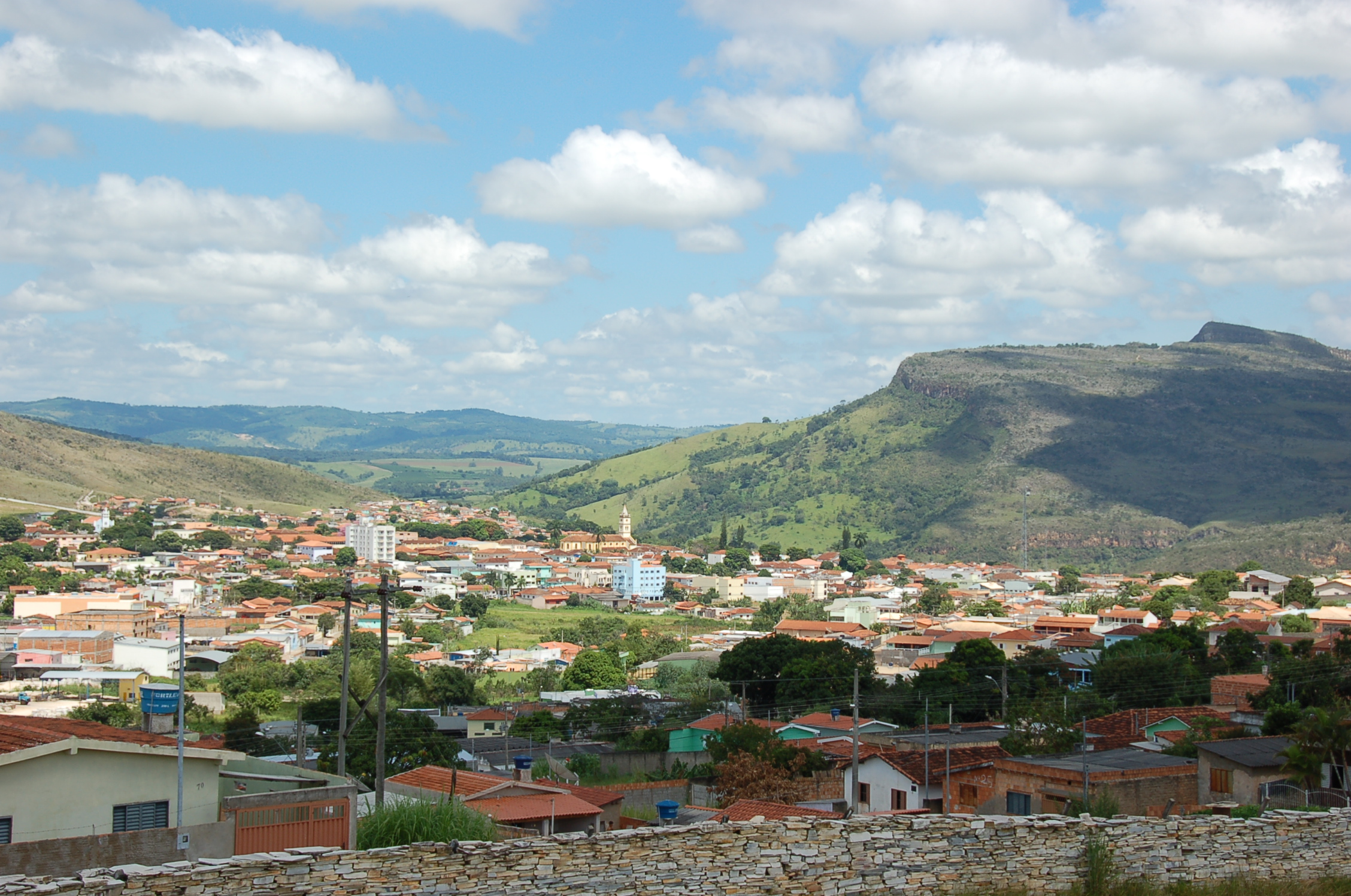
Alpinopolis seen from the Monte das Oliveiras Park - partial view. Photo: Felix Tansil.

== Geography ==
The city center of Alpinópolis is located at an elevation of 700 meters southeast of Passos and west of the Furnas reservoir. Neighboring municipalities are São José da Barra (N), Carmo do Rio Claro (E), Nova Resende and Bom Jesus da Penha (S), and Passos (W).

=== Distances ===
- Belo Horizonte: 332 km
- Passos: 43 km (north on MG-446 for 17 km, then west on MG-050 for 26 km)

== Economic activities ==
The economy is diversified with corn, high-quality coffee, beans, soybeans, semi-precious stones, dairy products, a feed factory, and manufacture of sweets being some of the main products. While coffee and milk were the main products for many years, nowadays one of the main products of the local economy is the extraction and commercialization of quartz. Small and medium-sized properties predominate in the municipality, which contribute for a better distribution of income.

In 2005 there were 48 extractive industries employing 361 workers, 77 transformation industries employing 251 workers, and 360 retail units employing 768 workers. The GDP in 2005 was approximately R$129 million, with 62 million reais from services, 18 million reais from industry, and 41 million reais from agriculture. There were 861 rural producers on 29,000 hectares of land. 212 farms had tractors (2006). Approximately 6000 persons were occupied in agriculture. The main crops are rice, beans, and corn. There were 20,000 head of cattle, of which 10,000 were milk cows (2006).

There were three banks (2010). In the vehicle fleet there were 3,641 automobiles, 358 trucks, 298 pickup trucks, 23 buses, and 882 motorcycles (2007).

== Health and education ==
In the health sector there were 15 health establishments: nine public and six private. There were four general health clinics and five specialized. There was one hospital with 30 beds (2005). Patients with more serious health conditions are transported to neighboring cities, such as Passos or Ribeirão Preto. Educational needs of their approximately 4,000 students were met by 12 primary schools, 4 middle schools, and 11 pre-primary schools.

== Culture ==
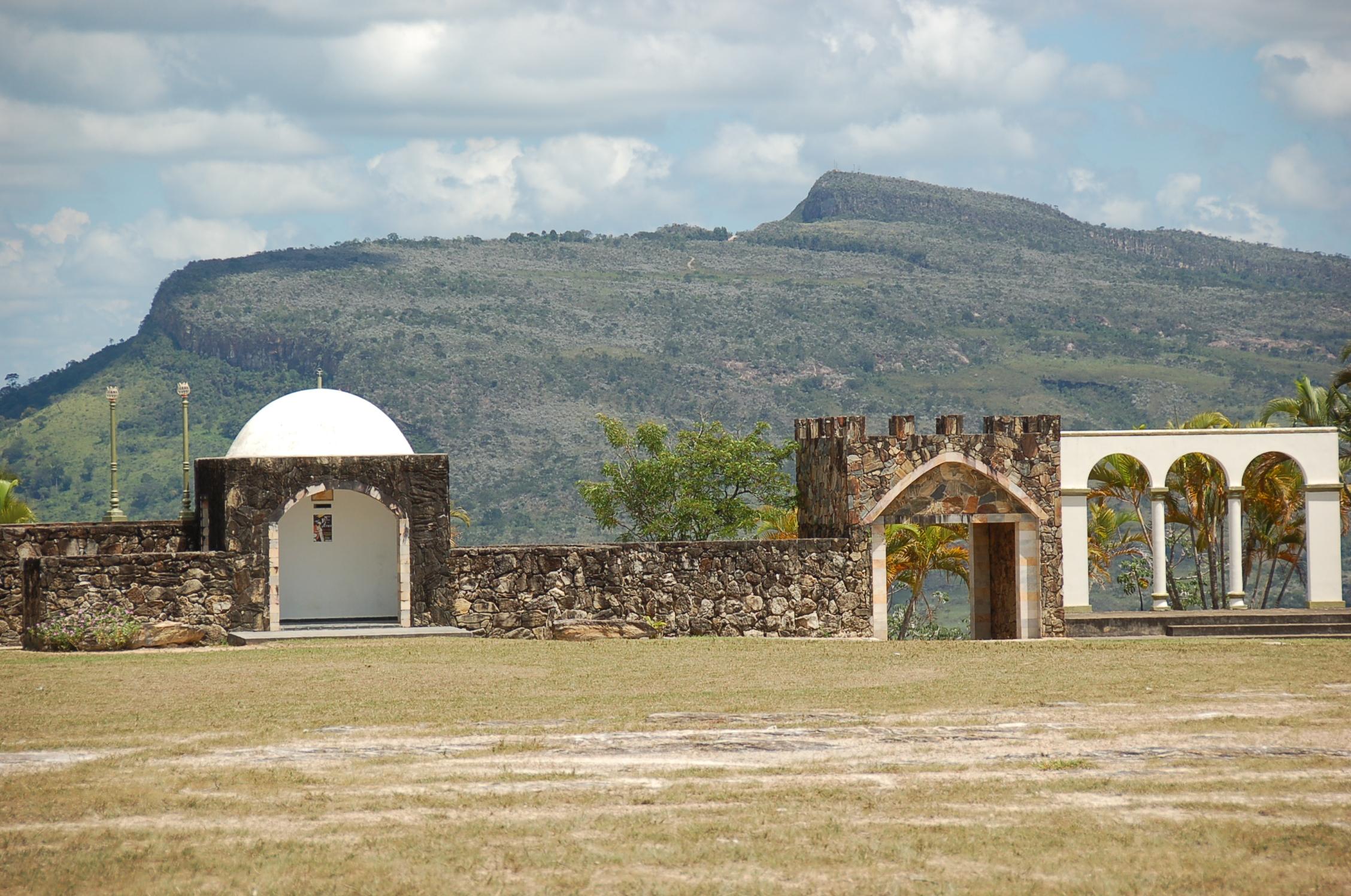
View of Monte das Oliveiras stage, where every year The Passion of Christ is reenacted during Holy Week. Serra da Ventania – Ventania Hills – in the background.

=== Congadas and Moçambique ===
Every year's end in Alpinopolis is marked by the Congadas or Congo and Moçambique celebration. This cheerful celebration consists of dancers and drum players walking around the city streets, wearing colorful satin costumes. The groups (ternos) use two main colors in their costumes and is led by a captain, who guides them through the streets of Alpinopolis, where they are joined by groups of curious people. Each day of the celebration ends up in one of the several churches of the city, where all groups join to attend a mass and resume the day activities.

It is not clear how this century-old celebration began, but it seems to be a derivation of an African tradition, as the names Congo and Mozambique suggest. It originally started as a religious related celebration, and over time, it became more of a colorful parade. Originally, the celebration would start months earlier, when religious people - here called reis (kings) or rainhas (queens) - would promise walking around town and attending a mass as thanksgiving for some miracle or grace received that year. Offering a meal (usually dinner) was also part of the thanksgiving ritual. Each group would be entitled to pick up a few people every day and guide them through the streets to the church, where the daily mass would be celebrated. After that, the group would attend the "thanksgiving dinner" offered by those people they guided earlier.

Nowadays, religiosity seems to have become less of the core of the celebration, and it became more of a colorful parade, where men of all ages spend time drinking, dancing and having fun.

=== Monte das Oliveiras ===
Idealized by José Iglair Lopes, the Monte das Oliveiras is an ecumenical "biblical park", built for reflection about the bible in different moments. From the main entrance, where a monument representing the Ten Commandments tablets stand, the visitors are guided through a series of small monuments representing important moments in Christ's life or crucial parts of the Old Testament.

It is currently considered one of the most beautiful and most important tourist attractions in Minas Gerais, especially during the Holy Week, when it becomes an outdoor stage for reenactment of the passion of Christ.

== City facts ==
- Municipal Human Development Index: 0.779 (2000)
- State ranking: 122 out of 853 municipalities as of 2000
- National ranking: 1094 out of 5,138 municipalities as of 2000
- Literacy rate: 89%
- Life expectancy: 73 (average of males and females)

In 2000 the per capita monthly income of R$239.00 was below the state average of R$276.00 and below the national average of R$297.00. Poços de Caldas had the highest per capita monthly income in 2000 with R$435.00. The lowest was Setubinha with R$73.00.

The highest ranking municipality in Minas Gerais in 2000 was Poços de Caldas with 0.841, while the lowest was Setubinha with 0.568. Nationally the highest was São Caetano do Sul in São Paulo with 0.919, while the lowest was Setubinha. In more recent statistics (considering 5,507 municipalities) Manari in the state of Pernambuco has the lowest rating in the country—0,467—putting it in last place.

== See also ==
- List of municipalities in Minas Gerais
