= Territorial Abbacy of Claraval =

Former Latin Catholic ecclesiastical jurisdiction

The Territorial Abbacy (or Abbey) of Claraval was a Latin Church ecclesiastical jurisdiction or prelature for Cistercians of the Catholic Church in Brazil.

== History ==
It was established on 11 May 1968 as Territorial Abbacy of Claraval (Portuguese for Clairvaux) on territory -including Claraval - in the southwest of the state Minas Gerais, canonically split off from the Roman Catholic Diocese of Guaxupé.

It was suppressed on 11 December 2002, its territory being merged back into the above Diocese of Guaxupé.

== Ordinaries ==
Abbot Ordinaries of Claraval

- Pedro José Agostini, Cistercian Order (O. Cist.) (1969.07.12 – death 1973), born 1904.04.12 in Italy
- Carmelo Domênico Recchia, O. Cist. (1976.12.07 – 1999.03.24), born 1921.12.14 in Italy
- Apostolic Administrator Orani João Tempesta, O. Cist. (1999.03.24 – 2002.12.11), only Brazilian Ordinary, while Bishop of Rio Preto (Brazil) (1997.02.26 – 2002.12.11); later Bishop of São José do Rio Preto (Brazil) (2002.12.11 – 2004.10.13), Metropolitan Archbishop of Belém do Pará (Brazil) (2004.10.13 – 2009.02.27), Metropolitan Archbishop of São Sebastião do Rio de Janeiro (Brazil) (2009.02.27 – ...), created Cardinal-Priest of S. Maria Madre della Provvidenza a Monte Verde (2014.02.22 [2014.04.12] – ...)

== External links and sources ==
- GCatholic, with Google satellite photo
