= Pratápolis =

Town and municipality in the state of Minas Gerais, Brazil

Coordinates: 20°44′42″S 46°51′39″W

- Municipality
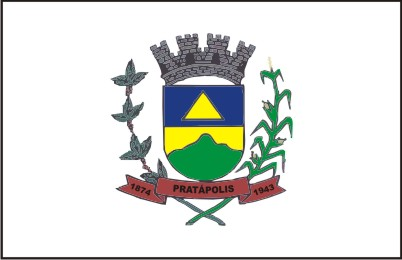
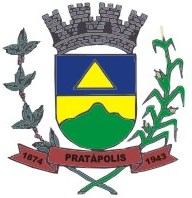
- Flag Coat of arms
- Interactive map of Pratápolis
- Country: Brazil
- State: Minas Gerais
- Region: Southeast
- Time zone: UTC−3 (BRT)

Location of Pratápolis on a map of the state of Minas Gerais

Pratápolis is a Brazilian municipality located in the southwest of the state of Minas Gerais. Its population as of 2020 was 8,566 people living in a total area of 214 km^{2} (83 sq mi). The city belongs to the meso-region of Sul e Sudoeste de Minas and to the micro-region of Passos. It became a municipality in 1943.

== Geography ==
The city center of Pratápolis is located at an elevation of 735 meters in the southwest of the state, a short distance west of regional center, Passos. For the most part the terrain is hilly with the maximum elevation reaching 1,012 meters. Neighboring municipalities are: Cássia (N, Itaú de Minas and Fortaleza de Minas (E), São Sebastião do Paraíso (S and SW), and Capetinga (W).

=== Temperatures ===
- Average annual: 21.3 °C
- Average annual maximum: 26 °C
- Average annual minimum: 15 °C

=== Distances ===
- Belo Horizonte: 358 km
- MG-050: 9 km
- Cássia: 33 km
- Itaú de Minas: 12 km
- Passos: 33 km
- Franca: 80 km
- Ribeirão Preto: 133 km
- São Sebastião do Paraíso: 28 km
- São Paulo: 420 km

== Economic activities ==
Services, small industrris, and agriculture are the main economic activities. The city has a cement factory: CCPI - Companhia de Cimento Portland Itaú. The GDP in 2005 was approximately R$54 million, with 3 million reais from taxes, 32 million reais from services, 5 million reais from industry, and 14 million reais from agriculture. In the industrial sector there were 74 small industries employing 148 workers (2005). There were 400 rural producers on 2,000 hectares of land. There was also modest poultry production. Approximately 1,000 persons were occupied in agriculture. The main crops are coffee, beans, and corn. There were 17,000 head of cattle, of which 2,000 were milk cows (2006).

There are 2 banks (2007). In the vehicle fleet there were 1,751 automobiles, 146 trucks, 124 pickup trucks, 10 buses, and 444 motorcycles (2007).

== Health and education ==
In the health sector there were 2 health clinics and 1 hospital with 5 beds (2005). Educational needs of 1,900 students were attended to by 4 primary schools, 1 middle school, and 1 pre-primary school.

- Municipal Human Development Index: 0.772 (2000)
- State ranking: 156 out of 853 municipalities as of 2000
- National ranking: 1261 out of 5,138 municipalities as of 2000
- Literacy rate: 89%
- Life expectancy: 72 (average of males and females)

In 2000 the per capita monthly income of R$230.00 was below the state average of R$276.00 and below the national average of R$297.00. Poços de Caldas had the highest per capita monthly income in 2000 with R$435.00. The lowest was Setubinha with R$73.00.

The highest ranking municipality in Minas Gerais in 2000 was Poços de Caldas with 0.841, while the lowest was Setubinha with 0.568. Nationally the highest was São Caetano do Sul in São Paulo with 0.919, while the lowest was Setubinha. In more recent statistics (considering 5,507 municipalities) Manari in the state of Pernambuco has the lowest rating in the country—0,467—putting it in last place.

== See also ==
- List of municipalities in Minas Gerais
