= Santo Antônio da Alegria =

- Municipality
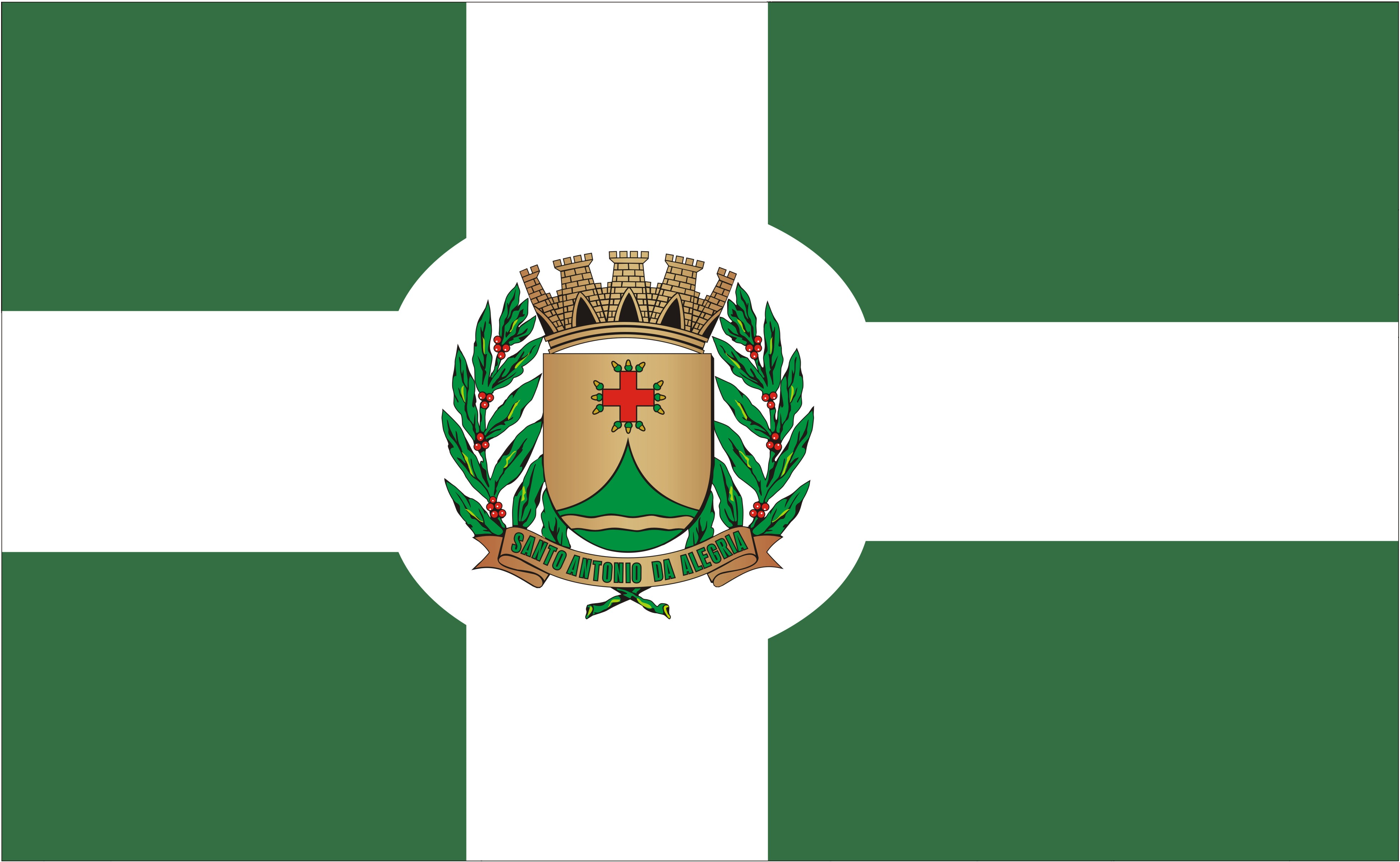
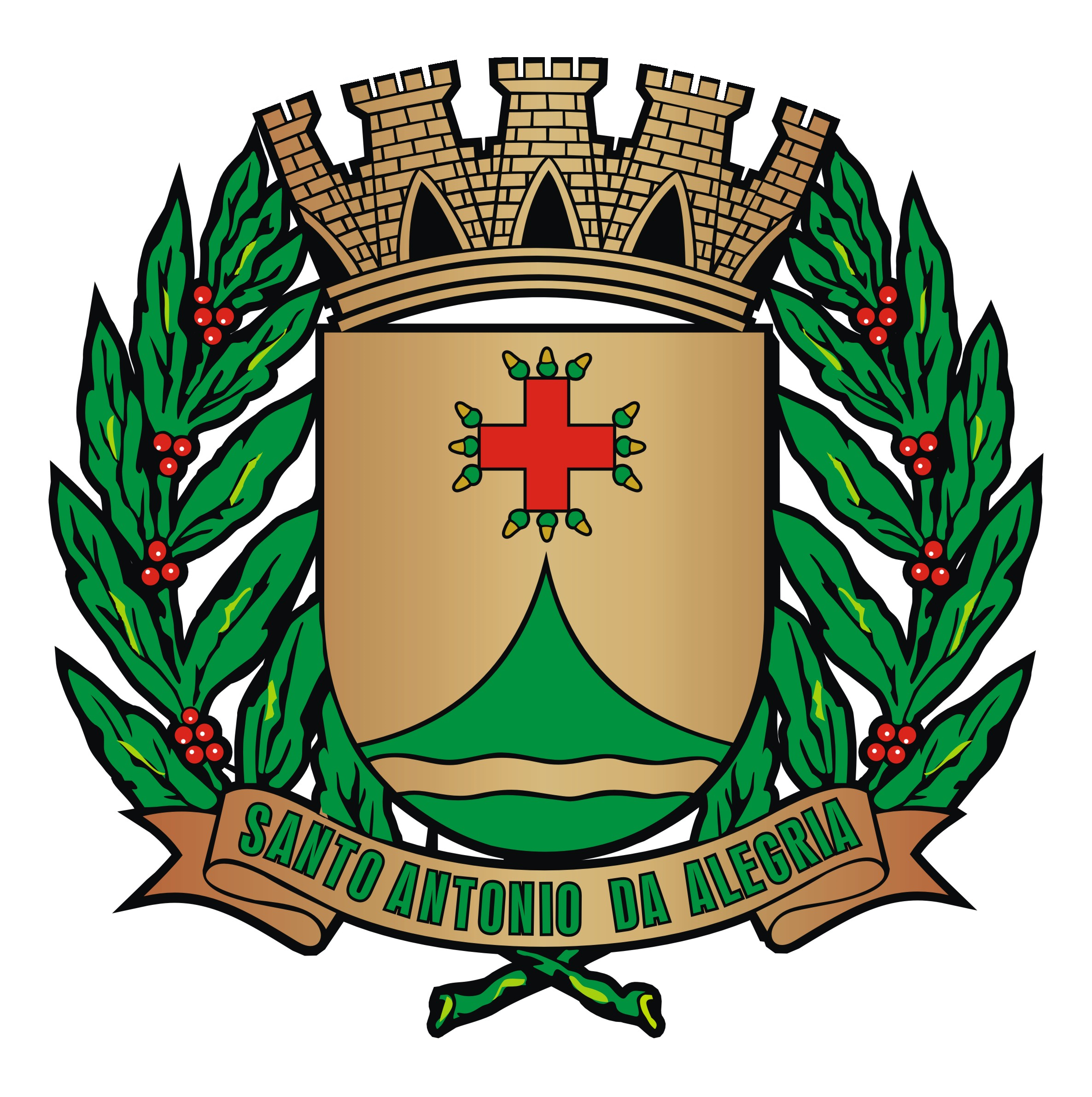
- Flag Coat of arms

- Location in São Paulo state

- Location in Brazil
- Coordinates: 21°5′13″S 47°9′4″W
- Country: Brazil
- Region: Southeast
- State: São Paulo
- Metrop. region: Ribeirão Preto

Government
  - Mayor: Ricardo da Silva Sobrinho (2021/2024)

Area
  - Total: 310.29 km^{2} (119.80 sq mi)
- Elevation: 791 m (2,595 ft)

Population (2020)
  - Total: 6,977
  - Density: 22.49/km^{2} (58.24/sq mi)
- Demonym: Alegriense
- Time zone: UTC−3 (BRT)
- Postal code: 14390-xxx
- Area code: +55-16
- Website: www.santoantoniodaalegria.sp.gov.br

Santo Antônio da Alegria is a municipality in the northern part of the state of São Paulo in Brazil. The population is 6,977 (2020 est.) in an area of 310.29 km^{2} (119.80 sq mi). The elevation is 791 m. A neighboring municipality is São Sebastião do Paraíso in Minas Gerais to the northeast.

== Government ==
- Mayor: Ricardo da Silva Sobrinho (2021/2024)
- Vice Mayor: Denilson de Carvalho (2021/2024)

== See also ==
- List of municipalities in São Paulo
- Interior of São Paulo
