= Itamogi =

Coordinates: 21°05′S 47°03′W

- Municipality
- Interactive map of Itamogi
- Country: Brazil
- Region: Southeast
- State: Minas Gerais
- Mesoregion: Sul/Sudoeste de Minas

Population (2020)
  - Total: 10,157
- Time zone: UTC−3 (BRT)

Itamogi is a municipality in the state of Minas Gerais in the Southeast region of Brazil.

== See also ==
- List of municipalities in Minas Gerais
