= Botelhos =

- Municipality
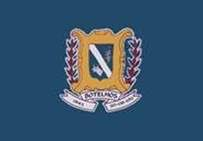
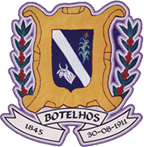
- Flag Coat of arms

- Location in Brazil
- Coordinates: 21°37′58″S 46°23′42″W
- Country: Brazil
- Region: Southeast
- State: Minas Gerais
- Mesoregion: Sudoeste de Minas

Government
  - Mayor: Eduardo Jose Alves de Oliveira (PP)

Population (2020)
  - Total: 14,949
  - Density: 11,590/sq mi (4,476/km^{2})
- Time zone: UTC−3 (BRT)

Botelhos is a municipality in the state of Minas Gerais in the Southeast region of Brazil.

The city was originally known as São José dos Botelhos but was elevated as a municipality on August 30, 1911 and renamed as Botelhos since 1915. Botelhos is known for its many religious denominations and Mateus Jerônimo Guiddi has been the mayor of the municipality since 2013.

== See also ==
- List of municipalities in Minas Gerais
