= Cássia =

Cassia
- Municipality
- Flag Coat of arms

- Location of Cássia within the state of Minas Gerais
- Coordinates: 20°35′S 48°55′W
- Country: Brazil
- Region: Southeast
- State: Minas Gerais
- Mesoregion: Oeste de Minas

Government
  - Mayor: Negrinho (Cidadania)

Population (2020)
  - Total: 17,740
- Time zone: UTC−3 (BRT)

Cássia is a Brazilian municipality located in the center of the state of Minas Gerais. Its population as of 2020 was 17,740 people living in a total area of 643 km^{2} (248 sq mi). The city belongs to the meso-region of Sul e Sudoeste de Minas and to the micro-region of Passos. It became a municipality in 1890.

== Geography ==
The city center of Cássia is located at an elevation of 745 meters in a fertile region between the state boundary of São Paulo and the great reservoir of Furnas. Neighboring municipalities are: Delfinópolis (N), Passos and Itaú de Minas (E), Pratápolis (S), Captetinga (SW), and Ibiraci (W).

Distances

- Belo Horizonte: 384 km (south on MG-344, then east on MG-050)
- São Sebastião do Paraíso: 65 km (31 southeast on MG-344, then 34 km southwest on MG-050)
- Ibiraci: 27 km northwest on MG-344

== Economic activities ==
Services and agriculture are the main economic activities. The GDP in 2005 was approximately R$135 million, with 71 million reais from services, 10 million reais from industry, and 45 million reais from agriculture. There were 884 rural producers on 48,000 hectares of land. Approximately 2,700 persons were occupied in agriculture. The main crops are coffee, sugarcane, rice, beans, and corn. There were 55,000 head of cattle, of which 18,000 were milk cows (2006).

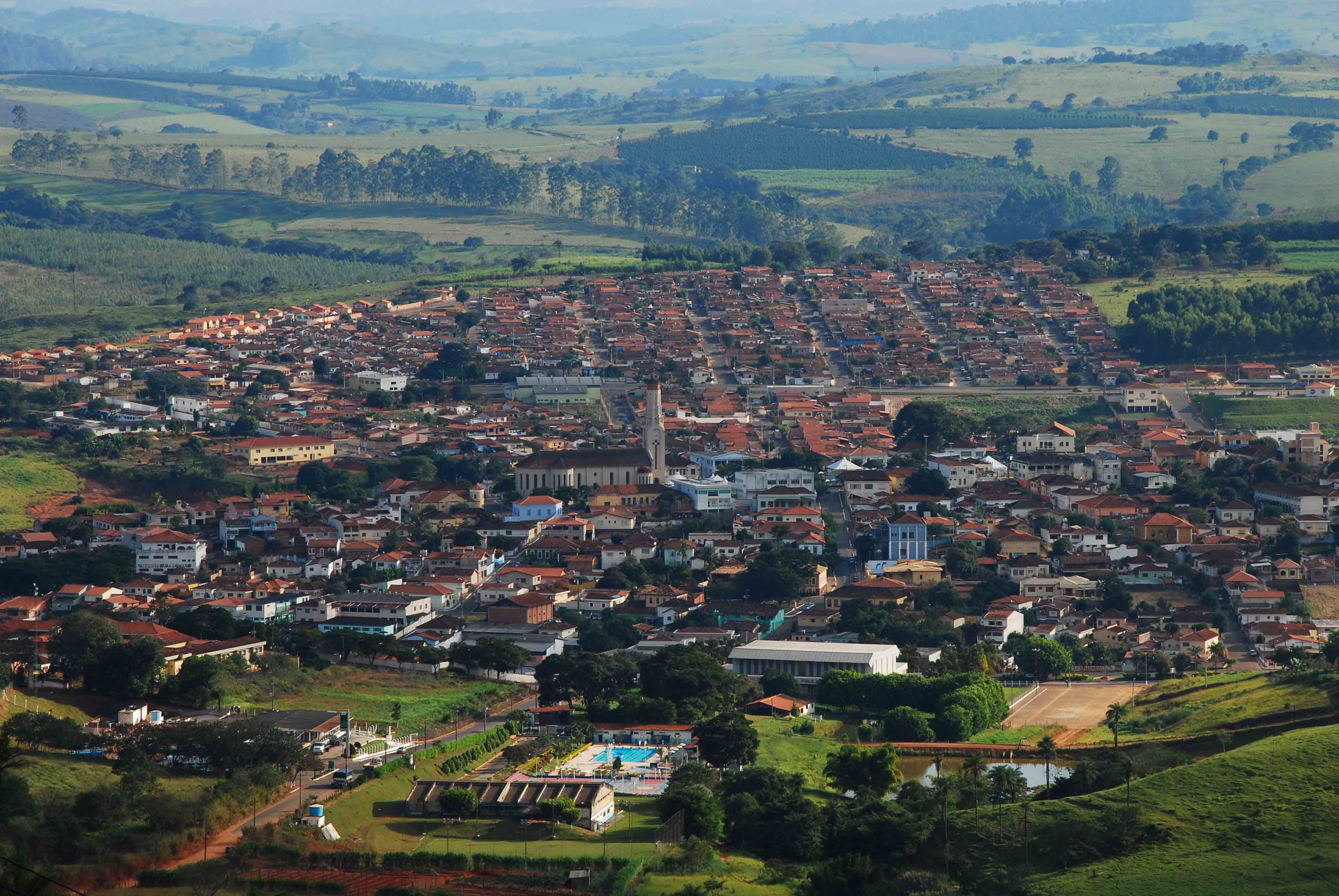
Panoramic view

Of the working force there were 555 workers in 187 small industries and 802 workers in 422 retail units.

There are 4 banks (2007)

In the vehicle fleet there were 2,896 automobiles, 349 trucks, 336 pickup trucks, 26 buses, and 622 motorcycles (2007).

== Health and education ==
In the health sector there were 10 health establishments, which included 6 public health clinics, 3 private clinics, and 1 private hospital with 46 beds (2005). Educational needs of 3,700 students were met by 10 primary schools, 2 middle schools, and 12 pre-primary schools.

- Municipal Human Development Index: 0.777 (2000)
- State ranking: 126 out of 853 municipalities as of 2000
- National ranking: 1,134 out of 5,138 municipalities as of 2000
- Literacy rate: 86%
- Life expectancy: 74 (average of males and females)

In 2000 the per capita monthly income of R$257.00 was below the state average of R$276.00 and below the national average of R$297.00. Poços de Caldas had the highest per capita monthly income in 2000 with R$435.00. The lowest was Setubinha with R$73.00.

The highest ranking municipality in Minas Gerais in 2000 was Poços de Caldas with 0.841, while the lowest was Setubinha with 0.568. Nationally the highest was São Caetano do Sul in São Paulo with 0.919, while the lowest was Setubinha. In more recent statistics (considering 5,507 municipalities) Manari in the state of Pernambuco has the lowest rating in the country—0,467—putting it in last place.

== See also ==
- List of municipalities in Minas Gerais
