= Divisa Nova =

Coordinates: 21°31′S 46°12′W

- Municipality
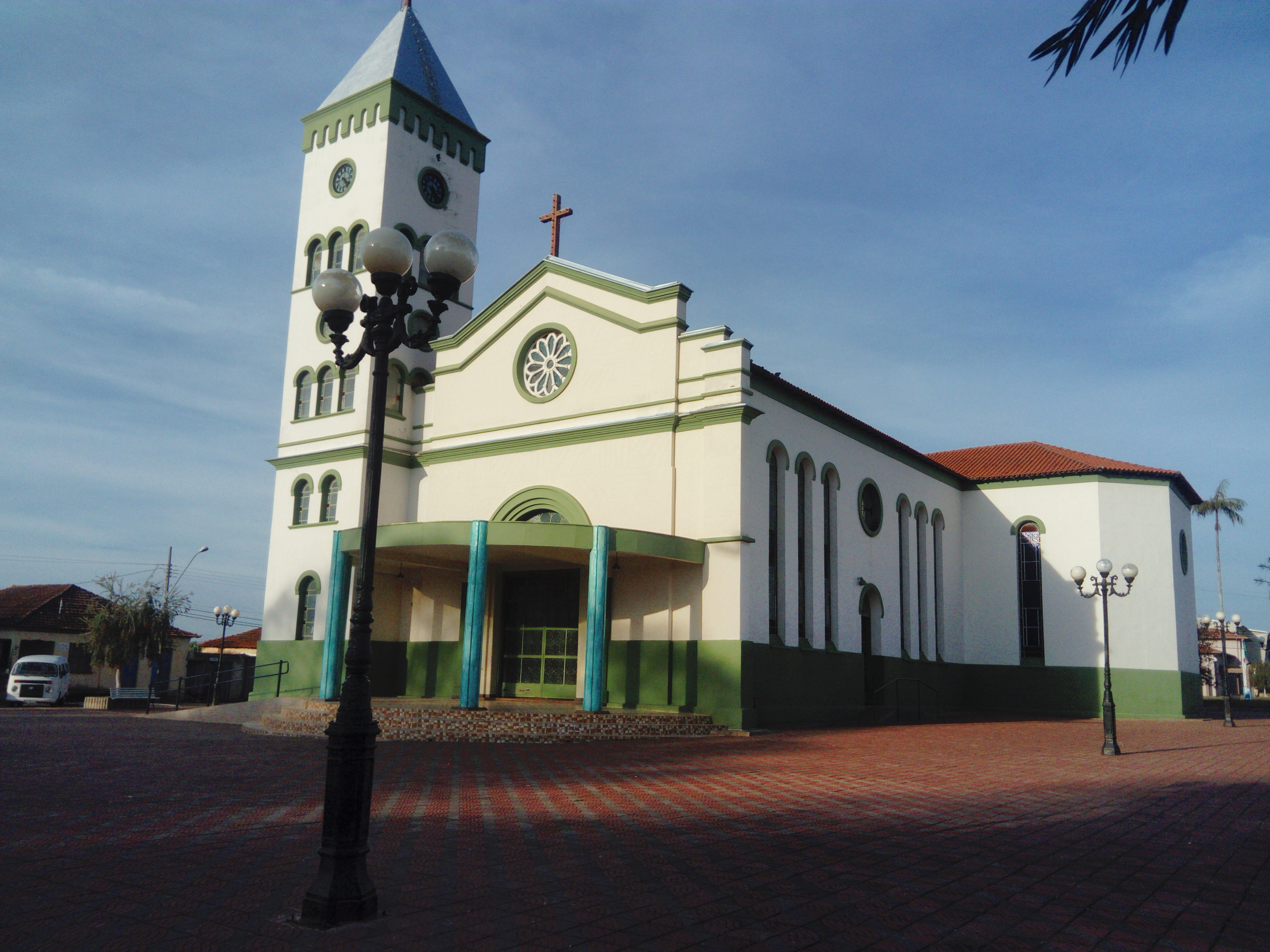

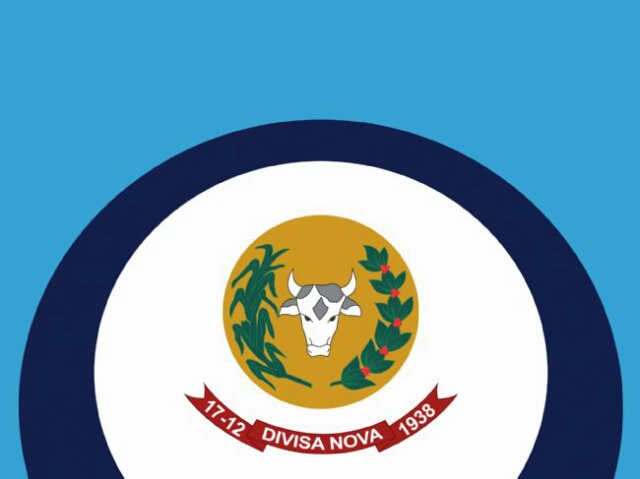
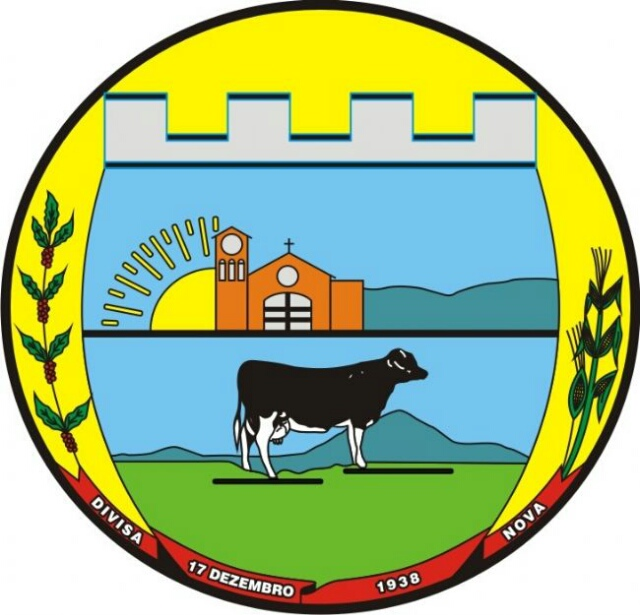
- Flag Coat of arms
- Interactive map of Divisa Nova
- Country: Brazil
- Region: Southeast
- State: Minas Gerais
- Mesoregion: Sud/Sudoeste de Minas

Government
  - Mayor: Elias Tassoti (PTB)

Population (2020)
  - Total: 6,025
- Time zone: UTC−3 (BRT)

Divisa Nova is a municipality in the state of Minas Gerais in the Southeast region of Brazil.

== See also ==
- List of municipalities in Minas Gerais
