= Passos, Minas Gerais =

Municipality in Minas Gerais, Brazil

Passos
- Municipality
- Municipality of Passos
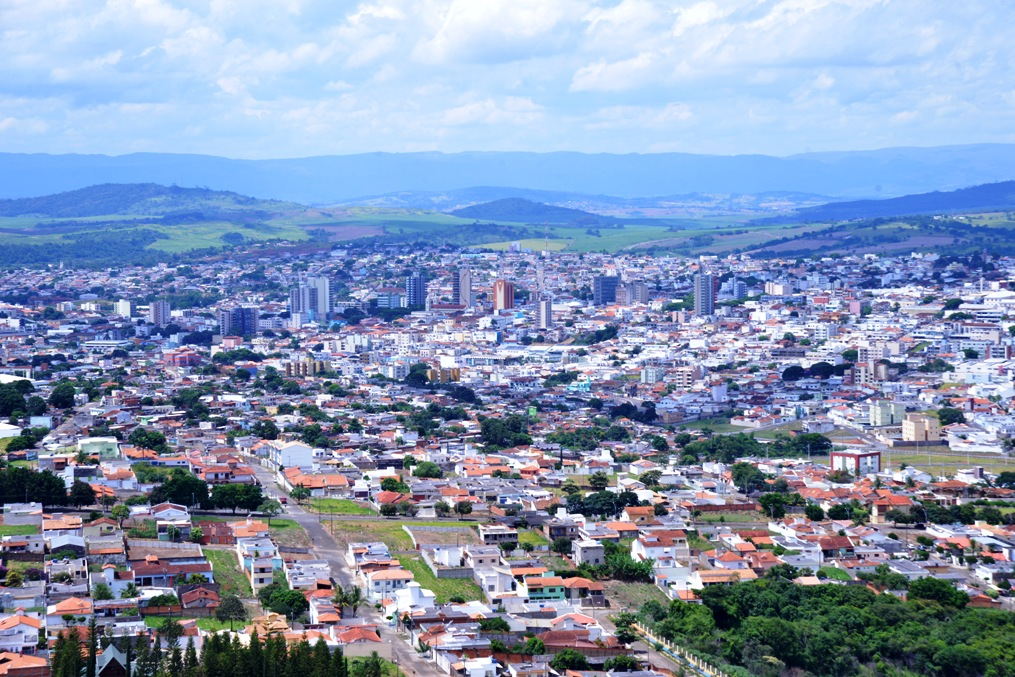
- Aerial view of Passos

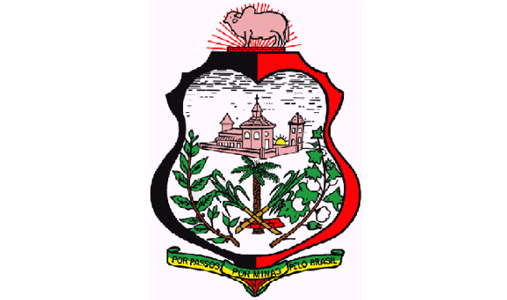
- Flag Coat of arms

- Location in Minas Gerais

- Location in Minas Gerais Location in Brazil
- Coordinates: 20°43′08″S 46°36′36″W
- Country: Brazil
- Region: Southeast
- State: Minas Gerais
- Intermediate region: Varginha
- Immediate region: Passos
- Municipality created: 9 October 1848
- Municipality installed: 7 September 1850
- City status: 14 May 1858

Government
  - Mayor: Maurício Antônio da Silva (PSD)
  - Term: 2026–2028

Area
  - Total: 1,338.070 km^{2} (516.632 sq mi)
- Elevation: 745 m (2,444 ft)

Population (2022 census)
  - Total: 111,939
  - Estimate (2025): 116,951
  - Density: 83.6571/km^{2} (216.671/sq mi)
- Demonym: passense
- Time zone: UTC−3 (BRT)
- Area code: 35
- HDI (2010): 0.756 (high)
- GDP per capita (2023): R$36,449.37
- Website: www.passos.mg.gov.br

Passos is a municipality in southwestern Minas Gerais, Brazil. It had a population of 111,939 in the 2022 census, with an estimated population of 116,951 in 2025, in an area of 1,338.070 km^{2} (516.632 sq mi). It is part of the Immediate Geographic Region of Passos, within the Intermediate Geographic Region of Varginha. The municipality takes its name from Senhor Bom Jesus dos Passos, the dedication of the chapel around which the settlement developed.

== Geography ==
=== Location ===
The municipal seat lies at an elevation of 745 metres, between the state boundary with São Paulo and the Furnas Reservoir. Neighboring municipalities are: Delfinópolis (N), São João Batista do Glória and São José da Barra (E), Alpinópolis (SE), Jacuí (S), Fortaleza de Minas (SW), and Itaú de Minas and Cássia (W).

=== Statistical Micro-region ===
Passos is a statistical micro-region consisting of 14 municipalities: Alpinópolis, Bom Jesus da Penha, Capetinga, Capitólio, Cássia, Claraval, Delfinópolis, Fortaleza de Minas, Ibiraci, Itaú de Minas, Passos, Pratápolis, São João Batista do Glória, and São José da Barra. In 2000 the population was 207,525 inhabitants living in a total area of 7,127.40 km^{2}.

Distances

- Belo Horizonte: 343 km east on MG-050
- São Sebastião do Paraíso: 52 km southwest on MG-050
- Divinópolis: 216 km northeast on MG-050
- Uberaba: 214 km northwest
- Ribeirão Preto: 205 km

Airport

- The airport is located 5 km from the city on highway MG 050, in the direction Passos/Itaú de Minas. It is adequate for daytime flights of light and medium-sized aircraft. The runway is tarmacked and measures 1500 m by 30 m. There is a departure lounge and modest facilities.

== Economy ==
Industry is the main economic activity of the municipality and is mainly centered in the production of sugar, yeast, milk byproducts and poultry. It has been expanding in other areas like heavy vehicle parts, cement, shoes and clothing. In 2005 520 transformation industries employing 5,719 workers. Other sectors were the retail sector employing 7,144 workers, public administration employing 1,141, and health services employing 1,276 workers. The GDP in 2005 was approximately R$874 million, with 523 million reais from services, 168 million reais from industry, and 104 million reais from agriculture. There were 1,196 rural producers on 87,000 hectares of land. Approximately 8,000 persons were occupied in agriculture. The main crops are coffee, sugarcane, rice, beans, and corn. There were 113,000 head of cattle, of which 34,000 were milk cows (2006).

There are 10 banks (2007): Banco ABN AMRO Real, Banco do Brasil, Bradesco, Banco Crediacip, Banco HSBC, Banco Itaú (3 branches), Banco Mercantil do Brasil, Banco Santander Brasil, and Banco Unibanco.

In the vehicle fleet there were 21,046 automobiles, 1,588 trucks, 2,075 pickup trucks, 304 buses, and 10,944 motorcycles (2007).

== Health and education ==
In the health sector there were 58 health establishments, which included 29 public health clinics and 3 hospitals with 416 beds (2005). Educational needs of 20,500 students were met by 38 primary schools, 15 middle schools, and 23 pre-primary schools. In higher education there was one school: Fundação de Ensino Superior de Passos.

- Municipal Human Development Index: 0.797 (2000)
- State ranking: 47 out of 853 municipalities as of 2000
- National ranking: 624 out of 5,138 municipalities as of 2000
- Literacy rate: 91%
- Life expectancy: 72 (average of males and females)

In 2000 the per capita monthly income of R$310.00 was above the state average of R$276.00 and below the national average of R$297.00. Poços de Caldas had the highest per capita monthly income in 2000 with R$435.00. The lowest was Setubinha with R$73.00.

Famous people from Passos: N. Jabur (Politician), Sebastiao Maia (Farmer), Monsenhor Matias (Religion), Dr. Manuel Patti (Spiritualism), Julio Garavello (Basketball Player) and the Brothers musicians Edinho & Tacilinho (Santa Cruz).

The highest ranking municipality in Minas Gerais in 2000 was Poços de Caldas with 0.841, while the lowest was Setubinha with 0.568. Nationally the highest was São Caetano do Sul in São Paulo with 0.919, while the lowest was Setubinha. In more recent statistics (considering 5,507 municipalities) Manari in the state of Pernambuco has the lowest rating in the country—0,467—putting it in last place.

== See also ==
- List of municipalities in Minas Gerais
