= Monte Santo de Minas =

Brazilian municipality in the south of the state of Minas Gerais

Coordinates: 21°12′S 46°59′W

- Municipality
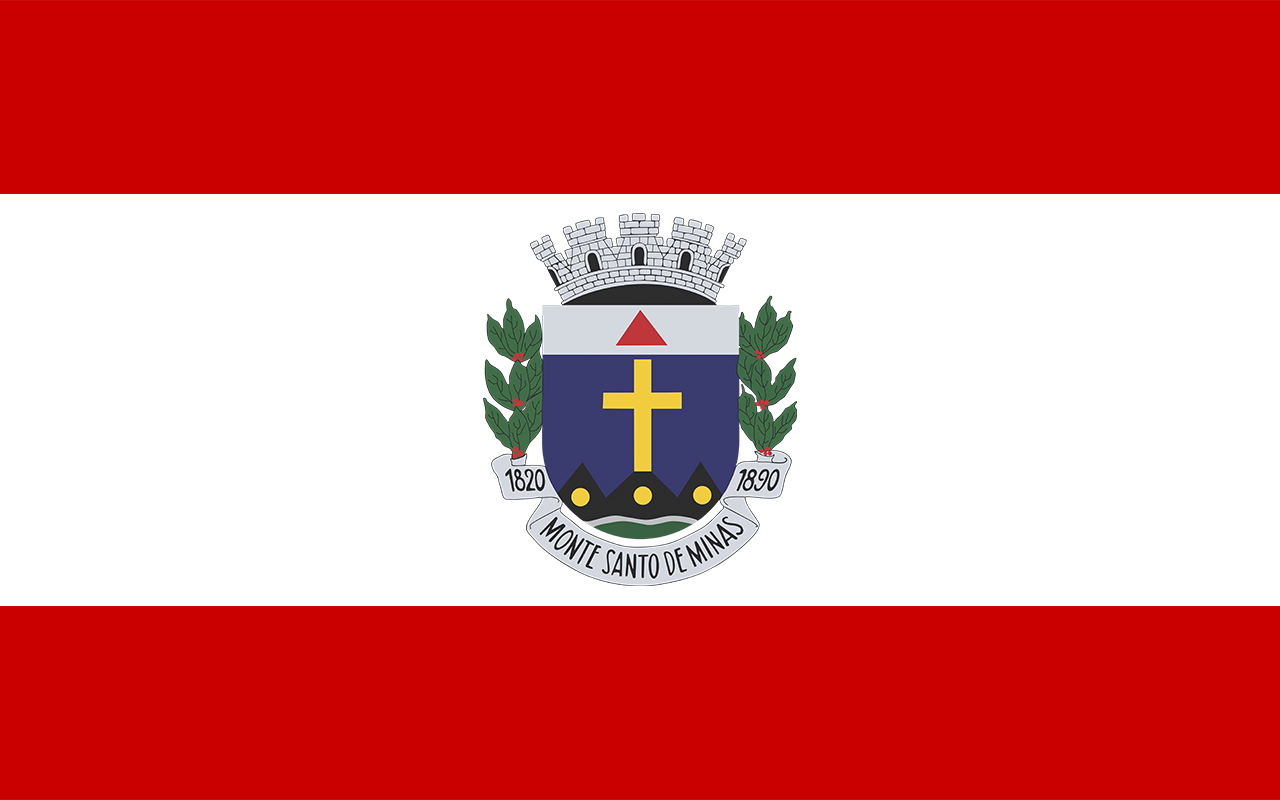
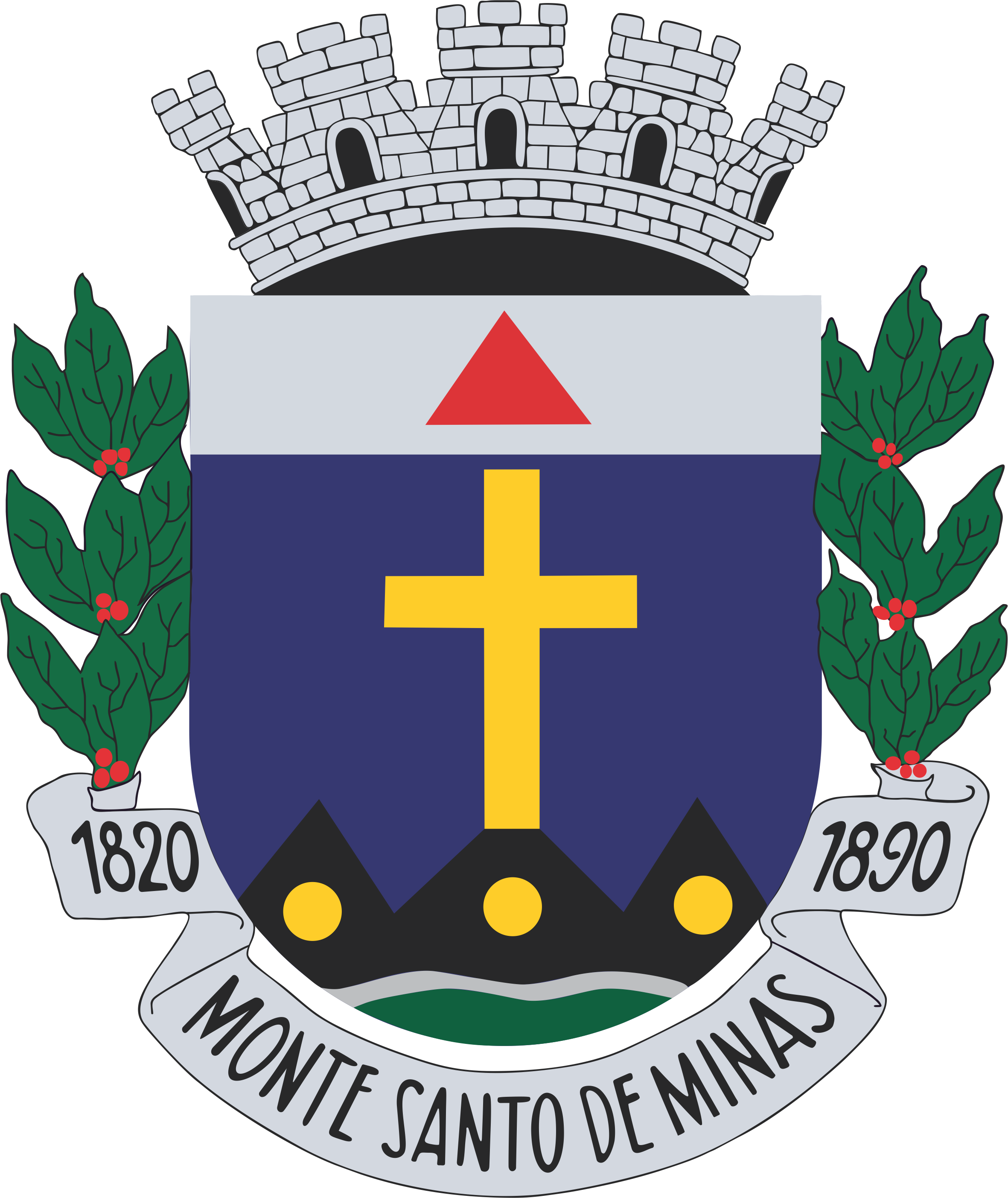
- Flag Coat of arms
- Interactive map of Monte Santo de Minas
- Country: Brazil
- State: Minas Gerais
- Region: Southeast
- Time zone: UTC−3 (BRT)

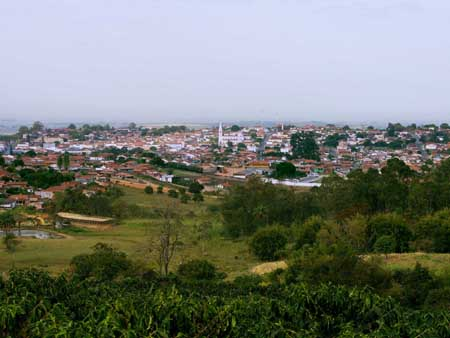
Monte Santo

Monte Santo de Minas is a Brazilian municipality in the south of the state of Minas Gerais. Its population is 21,513 inhabitants, according to the 2020 estimate. Its area is 594.6 km^{2} and its density is 35.8 inhabitants per square kilometer.

== Notable people ==
- Rubens Donizete (born 1979), Brazilian olympic cyclist
- Mário Américo, masseusse for the Brazilian football team
- Milionário, singer

== See also ==
- List of municipalities in Minas Gerais
