= São Tomás de Aquino =

Town and municipality in the state of Minas Gerais, Brazil

Coordinates: 20°47′02″S 47°05′52″W

- Municipality
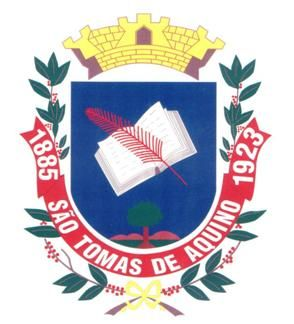
- Coat of arms
- Interactive map of São Tomás de Aquino
- Country: Brazil
- State: Minas Gerais
- Region: Southeast
- Time zone: UTC−3 (BRT)

São Tomás de Aquino is a Brazilian municipality in the southwest of the state of Minas Gerais. As of 2020 its population is estimated to be about 7,000. It is named after the Christian philosopher Saint Thomas Aquinas.

== See also ==
- List of municipalities in Minas Gerais
