= Monte Belo =

Coordinates: 21.3258°S 46.3678°W

- Municipality
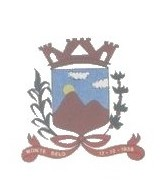
- Coat of arms
- Interactive map of Monte Belo
- Country: Brazil
- Region: Southeast
- State: Minas Gerais
- Mesoregion: Sul/Sudoeste de Minas

Population (2020)
  - Total: 13,152
- Time zone: UTC−3 (BRT)

Monte Belo is a municipality in the state of Minas Gerais in the Southeast region of Brazil.

== See also ==
- List of municipalities in Minas Gerais
