= Muzambinho =

- Municipality
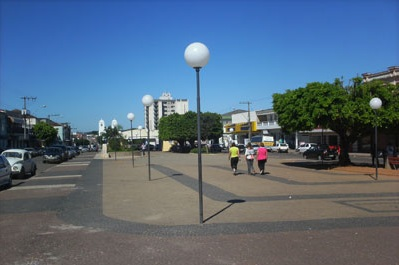
- View of Dr. Américo Luz avenue

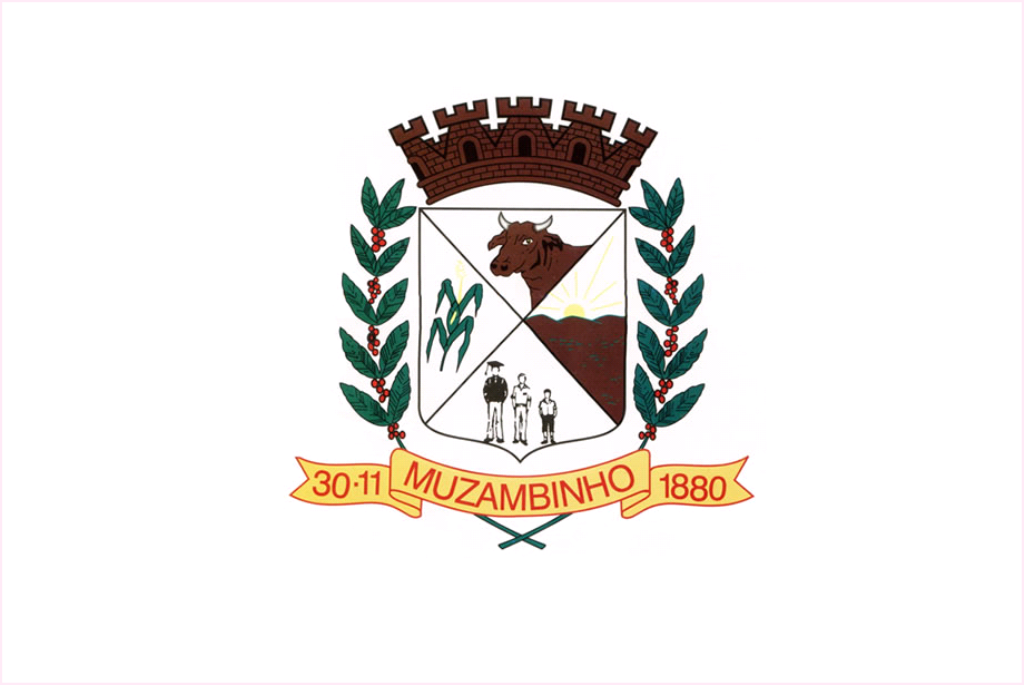
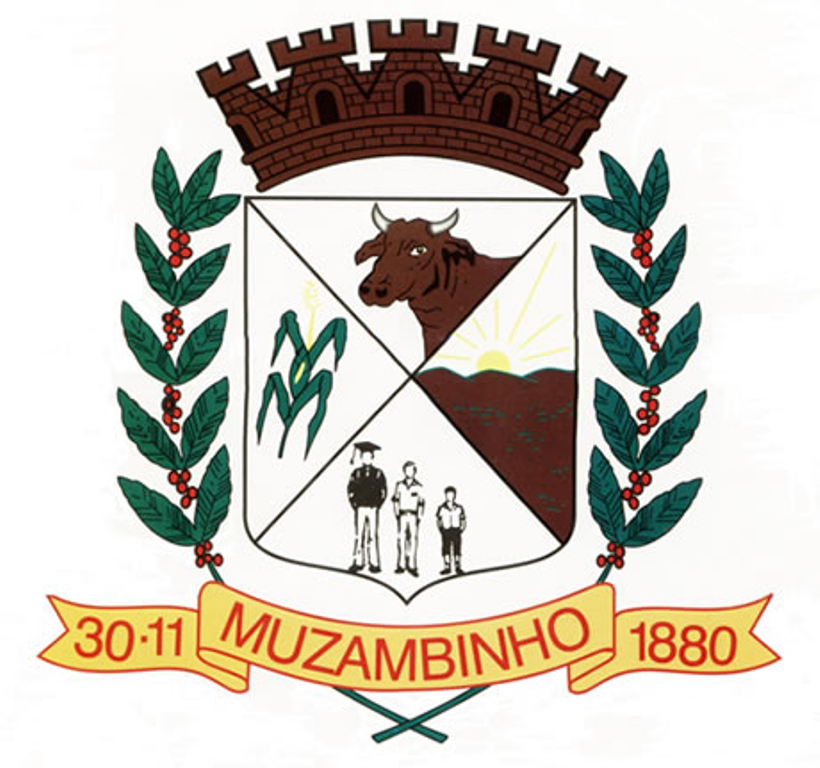
- Flag Coat of arms

- Location in Minas Gerais

- Location in Brazil
- Coordinates: 21°22′33″S 46°31′33″W
- Country: Brazil
- Region: Southeast
- State: Minas Gerais
- Mesoregion: South and Southwest of Minas Gerais
- Microregion: São Sebastião do Paraíso
- Founded: October 8th, 1860
- Incorporated: November 12th, 1878

Government
  - Mayor: Ivan Antônio de Freitas

Area
  - Total: 157,930 sq mi (409,036 km^{2})
- Elevation: 3,600 ft (1,100 m)

Population (2020)
  - Total: 20,545
- Time zone: UTC−3 (BRT)
- CEP postal code: 37890-000
- Area code: 35
- HDI (2008): 0.801
- Website: Official Website

Muzambinho is a municipality in the state of Minas Gerais in the Southeast region of Brazil.

== See also ==
- List of municipalities in Minas Gerais
