= Imirim =

Coordinates: 23.4889°S 46.6514°W

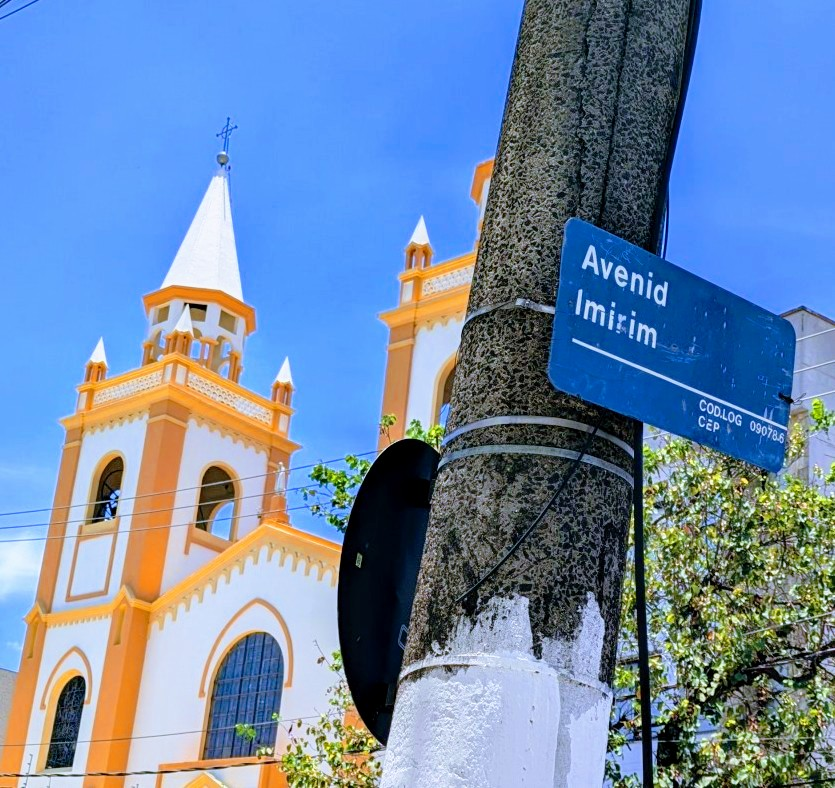
Parish of Our Lady of Fatima on Imirim Avenue.

Imirim is a neighborhood in the northern zone of São Paulo city, State of São Paulo, in Brazil. Its birthday is celebrated on May 13. Its official day was originally sanctioned by Law #12 789, 1999, having been repealed by Law #14 485, of July 19, 2000.
