= Nova Resende =

- Municipality
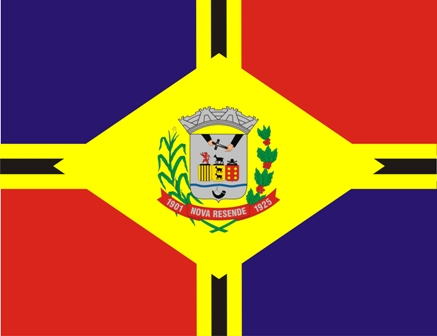
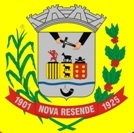
- Flag Coat of arms

- Location in Brazil
- Coordinates: 21°7′33″S 46°25′12″W
- Country: Brazil
- Region: Southeast
- State: Minas Gerais
- Mesoregion: Sul/Sudoeste de Minas

Population (2020)
  - Total: 16,832
- Time zone: UTC−3 (BRT)

Nova Resende is a municipality in the state of Minas Gerais in the Southeast region of Brazil.

== See also ==
- List of municipalities in Minas Gerais
