= Jacuí =

Municipality in the state of Minas Gerais in the Southeast region of Brazil

- Municipality
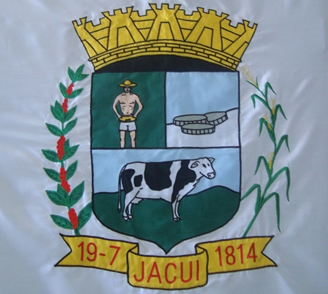
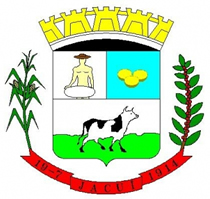
- Flag Coat of arms

- Location in Brazil
- Coordinates: 21°01′01″S 46°44′27″W
- Country: Brazil
- Region: Southeast
- State: Minas Gerais
- Mesoregion: Sul/Sudoeste de Minas

Area
  - Total: 409.738 km^{2} (158.201 sq mi)

Population (2020)
  - Total: 7,691
  - Density: 18.77/km^{2} (48.62/sq mi)
- Time zone: UTC−3 (BRT)

Jacuí is a municipality in the state of Minas Gerais in the Southeast region of Brazil.

== See also ==
- List of municipalities in Minas Gerais
