= Piumhi =

- Municipality
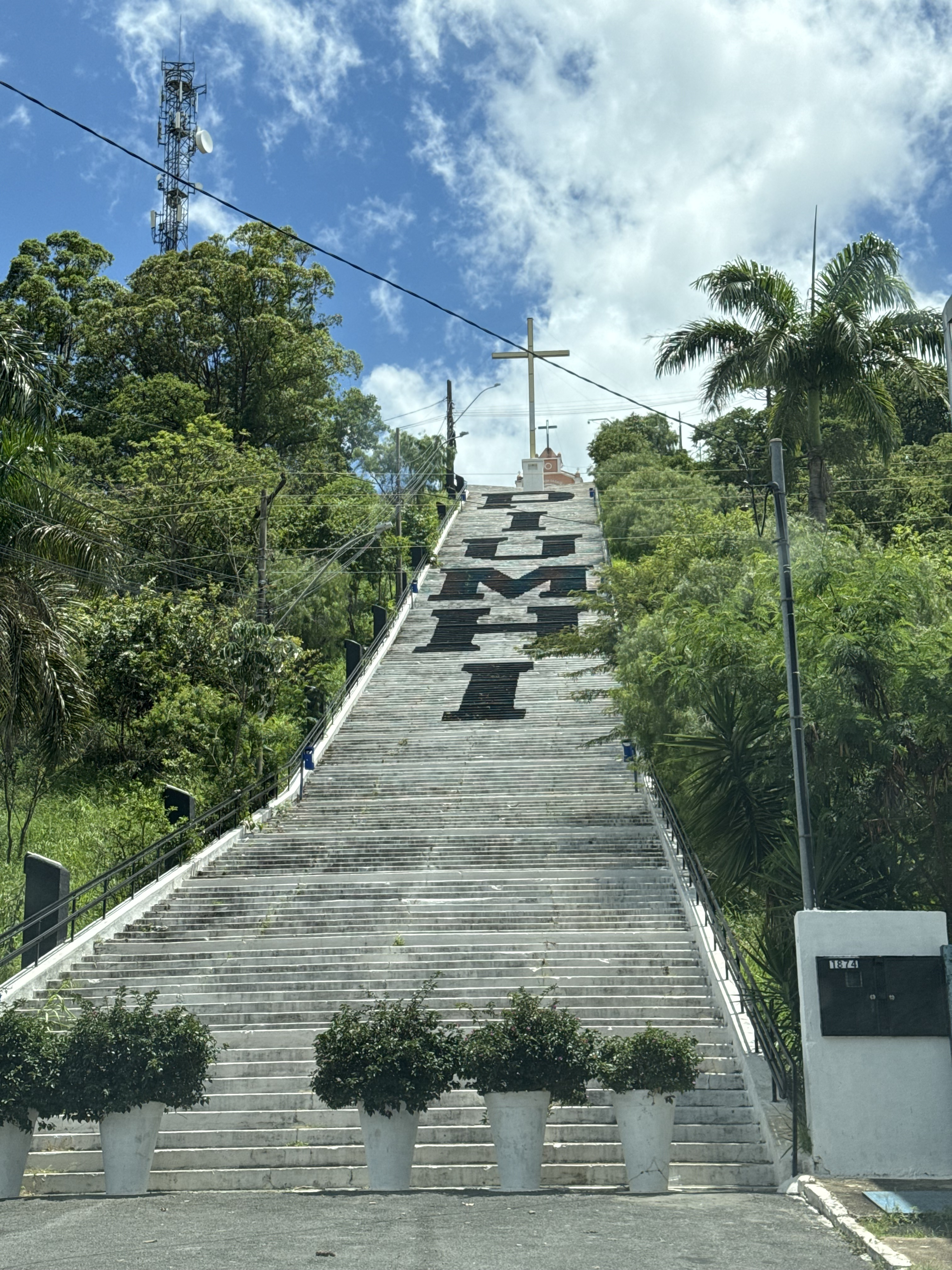
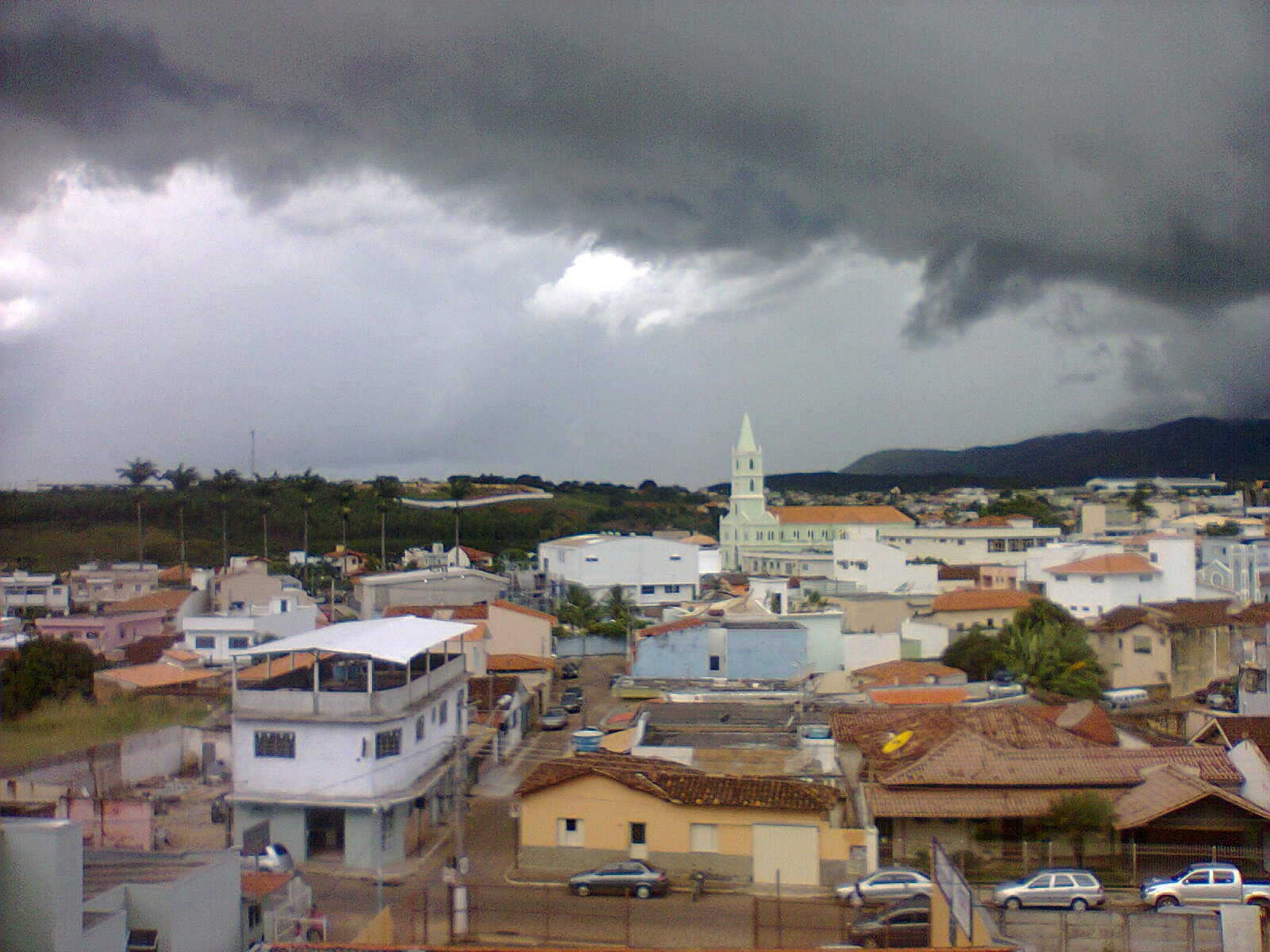
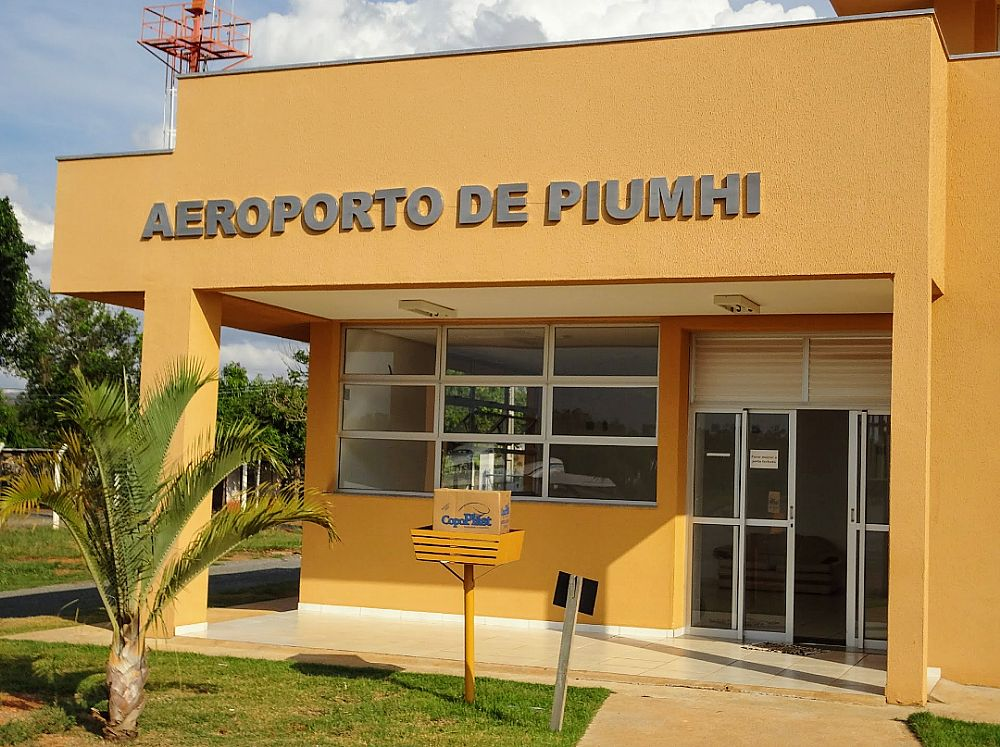
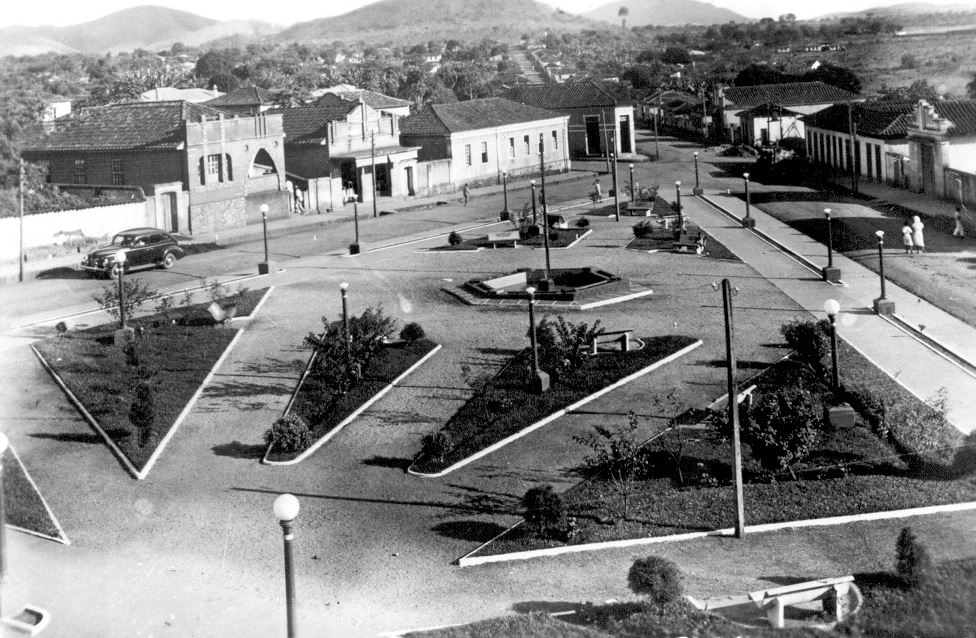
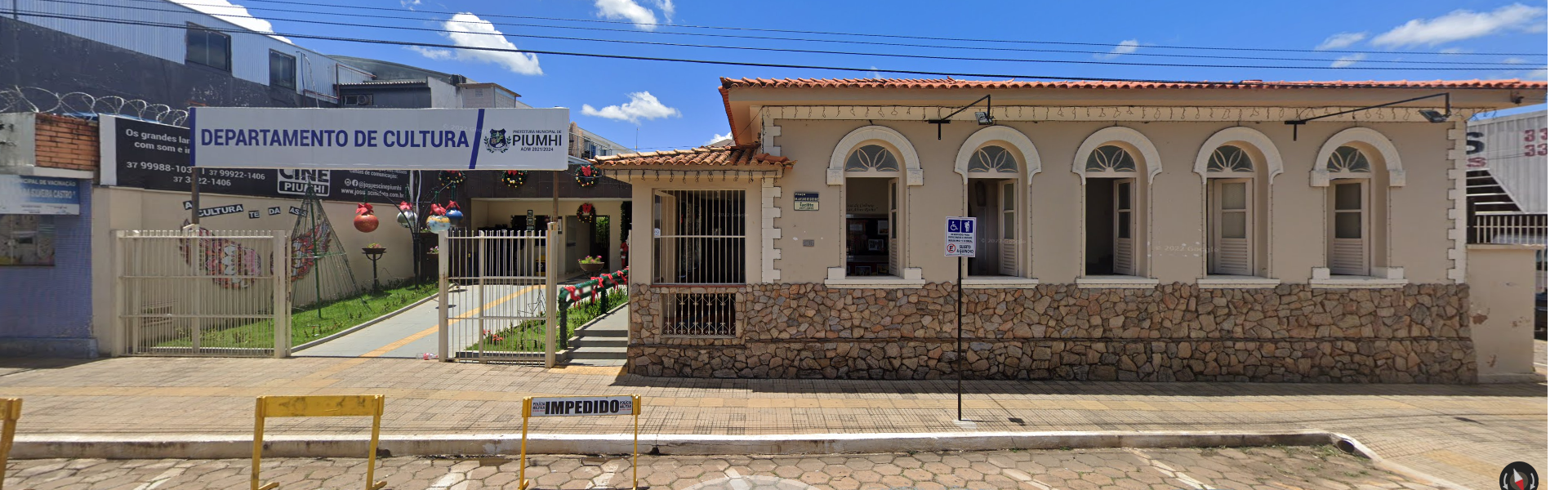
- Cruz do Monte stairs Piumhi skyline Dr. Vitrasiano Leonel Municipal Airport Old Padre Alberico Square Piumhi Cultural Centre

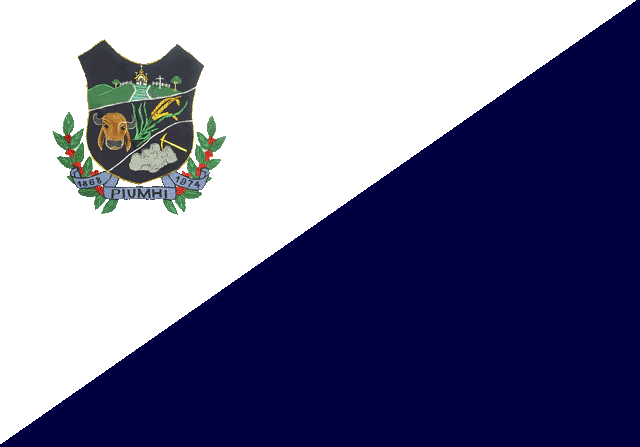
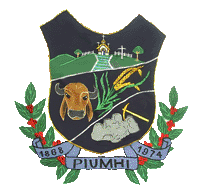
- Flag Coat of arms
- Etymology: Old Tupi: pi'um'y ("river of black flies") or Piauí ("fish river")
- Nickname: The Caring City
- Motto: Work and Justice
- Location within Minas Gerais
- Interactive map of Piumhi
- Location within Brazil
- Coordinates: 20°27′54″S 45°57′28″W
- Country: Brazil
- State: Minas Gerais
- Intermediate region: Varginha
- Immediate region: Piumhi
- Founded: July 20, 1868

Government
  - Type: Mayor–council government
  - Body: Piumhi City Hall
  - Mayor: Paulo César Vaz (PP)
  - Vice-mayor: José Cirineu da Silva

Area
  - Total: 902.468 km^{2} (348.445 sq mi)
- Elevation: 793 m (2,602 ft)

Population (2022)
  - Total: 36,062
  - Density: 39.96/km^{2} (103.5/sq mi)
- Demonym: Piumhiense or Piuiense
- Time zone: UTC−3 (UTC−03:00)
- Postal code: 37925-000 to 37925-999
- Area code: +55 37
- ISO 3166 code: BR-MG
- Website: prefeiturapiumhi.mg.gov.br

Piumhi (Brazilian Portuguese pronunciation: [piũˈi]) is a municipality in the state of Minas Gerais, Brazil. It serves as the seat of the Immediate Geographic Region of Piumhi within the Intermediate Geographic Region of Varginha. According to the 2022 census, it has a population of 36,062 inhabitants.

It is ranked as the 45th municipality in quality of life among the 853 municipalities of Minas Gerais, with a life expectancy of 67.1 years. In a ranking of moderate socio-economic development, Piumhi was placed 110th in Minas Gerais, with an index of 0.7564.

== Etymology ==
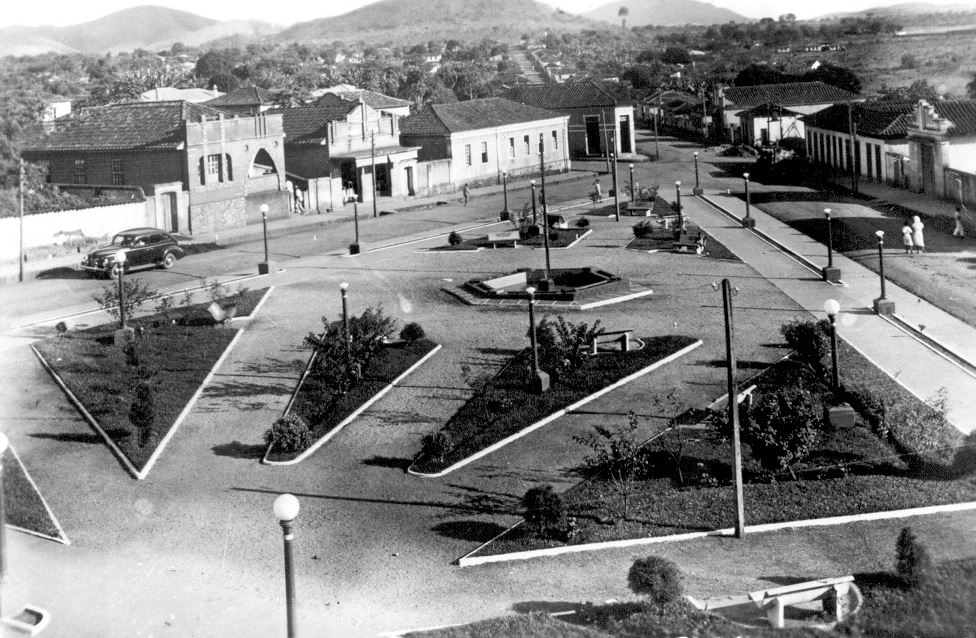
Former Padre Alberico Square in Piumhi, MG

There are two etymological hypotheses for the toponym "Piumhi":

- It may derive from the Old Tupi term pi'um'y, meaning "river of black flies" (pi'um meaning "black fly" and y meaning "river").
- The meaning of the word "Piumhi" is also presented in historical documents as deriving from the Tupi term for "fish river", referring to the Piuí River. The analysis follows the methodology of Teodoro Sampaio in his work O Tupi na Geografia Nacional. According to his writings, to determine the etymology of a toponym, one must first examine its original orthography as recorded in the oldest documents. In early records, including ecclesiastical and historical archives, the name of the place and the river appears as Piauhy.

Historically and in surviving documents, the name is written as follows:

- a) In the report by Alferes Moreira (Notícias Práticas das Minas Gerais: do Ouro e Diamantes).
- b) In the second account given by Alferes Moreira to Father Diogo Soares regarding his expeditions that led to the discovery of the celebrated Morro da Esperança in 1731 and 1732.
- c) In all regional land grant (sesmaria) requests.
- d) In documents from the late 18th century and early 19th century, where the spelling is consistently recorded as Piauhy.

In the ecclesiastical archives of Mariana, numerous documents contain this spelling, such as a petition dated 1823, in which members of the chapel of São Roque requested that their chapel be affiliated with the Parish of Piauhy. In the same archives, however, some documents also record the spelling Piauim. The first parish vicar, Father Félix José da Silva, wrote it as Piauim, while other vicars used Piuhy.

Analysing these old records reveals an evolution in spelling: the original Piauhy was altered to Piauim, indicating a phonetic variation known as nasalization.

This linguistic variation, described by Teodoro Sampaio from a colonial perspective as a "language corruption" inherited from indigenous languages, led to further changes, resulting in the final form Piumhi.

Regarding the meaning of the phoneme Piumhi, the same methodology applies: an analysis based on documented historical records. Since the original spelling was Piauhy and nasalization occurred in the 19th century, the original meaning must be sought in Piauhy. This term consists of piau = fish and i = water, river, forming Piauí, meaning "fish river".

A specific reason for this name was provided by Alferes Moreira, who, when referring to the Piauí River, reported that "it has plenty of fish".

Moreira also mentioned the São Francisco River, travelled extensively along the Rio Grande (Minas Gerais), referenced the Lambari River, and cited the Rio Verde, describing them all as abundant in fish. However, only the Piuí River caught his attention due to its exceptional fish population.

The name Piumhi eventually gained popularity among locals, leading to the enactment of a law that officially recognized this spelling.

It is also important to note that Tupi-origin toponyms in Minas Gerais were not created by the native peoples of the region, as they did not belong to the Tupi people. Instead, these names were coined either by indigenous guides accompanying expeditions, usually from coastal areas, or by bandeirantes like Batista Maciel, who spoke the general language.

== History ==
Until the 18th century, the present-day state of Minas Gerais was inhabited by various indigenous nations belonging to the Macro-Jê linguistic trunk. In 1731, the region was explored by the sertanista João Batista Maciel, who, originating from São Paulo, led an expedition searching for gold near the source of the São Francisco River. Maciel settled in Piraquara, on the right bank of the São Francisco River, within the jurisdiction of the town of Pitangui. That same year, he organised an expedition with his sons, associates, and enslaved people, exploring the Upper São Francisco and discovering gold panning sites along the Piuí River. Later in 1731, Maciel returned to Pitangui with news of the discovery of gold mines in the hinterland of Piuí.

An immediate expedition was organised, led by the parish priest of Pitangui, Father Luís Damião, and the procurator of the town council, João Veloso Falcão. Maciel himself guided the group, which was large and aimed to claim ownership of the "land of Piui". They proceeded and took possession of the hinterlands. Father Damião celebrated Mass, considered the first celebrated in Piuí, in 1731, but the gold was not found in the expected abundance.

Due to the disappointment, Batista Maciel was arrested as a fraudulent discoverer, accused of causing the significant expenses incurred by the expedition. However, two of his sons and several associates mutinied, leading to an exchange of gunfire in which the chamber procurator, João Veloso Falcão, was wounded in the arm. Free once again, Batista Maciel withdrew with his sons, associates, and enslaved people, relocating to Perdizes, along the São Francisco River, near what is now the city of Iguatama.

Two other explorers, sertanistas, also have their efforts documented: Captain Tomás de Souza, who resided in Pitangui and followed the "Three Hills" route through the Piui hinterlands and the Upper São Francisco, and Alferes Moreira, who also set out from Pitangui and explored the region. Moreira documented his encounter with Batista Maciel and Tomás de Souza in Piui in his "2nd Report to Father Diogo Soares".

The town developed around mining activities along the banks of the Cavalo stream, initially named Nossa Senhora do Livramento.

In 1736, the region was traversed by the Goiás Trail, and the first land grants were distributed. The trail was not a government initiative; it was opened by a group of explorers who requested certain privileges, such as priority access to land grants along the trail and a temporary prohibition on settlement by outsiders. These demands were granted, and the corresponding decree was issued by Governor Martinho de Mendonça de Pina e Proença in July 1736.

Shortly after the land grants were issued, the settlers were forced to leave, effectively halting travel along the trail. Escaped enslaved individuals formed quilombos in the region, engaging in raids and causing disruptions until 1743, when they were attacked and their settlements destroyed. This marked the resumption of colonization and mining activities.

By 1752, mining had intensified, possibly marking the beginning of the village. That same year, Father Marcos Freire de Carvalho, acting as an emissary from Mariana, officially claimed Piumhi for the diocese.

In early 1754, when the mines of the Captaincy of Minas Gerais were generally depleted and most miners had lost hope, the sudden news of "gold! Gold in abundance in Piuí!" reignited the gold rush. Prospectors arrived from Tamanduá, São João, São José do Brumado, and other regions.

The ombudsman of the Rio das Mortes District immediately ordered the lord high guard of Passa Tempo to travel to Piuí to oversee the distribution of mining plots and prevent disputes. In March 1754, the ombudsman informed the São José del Rei Council about the new gold discovery, the influx of people already there, and those en route, suggesting that the council take possession of the land before the Pitangui Council did.

On 28 March 1754, in the home of José da Serra Caldeira, the representatives of the São José del Rei Council, bailiff Leandro de Arruda and Sergeant Major Francisco José Beserto, officially took possession of the Piuí mining site, bringing its settlers and districts under the authority of the São José village.

After the gold fever subsided, land grant requests continued, with various settlers establishing themselves.

By 1758, the settlement was thriving. According to multiple sources, a parish was established that year. However, documents show that Bishop Dom Frei José da Santíssima Trindade officially designated the São Roque chapel as subordinate to the Piuí parish in 1754, under the initiative of farmer Manoel Marques de Carvalho, who had founded the São Roque chapel. This parish was declared a royal chartered parish by decree on 26 January 1803. The first appointed vicar, in 1803, was Father Antônio Teles. Prior to that, the parish was served by appointed vicars; Cônego Trindade records the appointment of Father José Soares da Silva on 6 July 1773 as the vicar of the new discoveries of Piauim.

The parish was elevated to a village with municipal autonomy by Law No. 202 on 1 April 1841, separating it from the municipality of Formiga.

Law No. 1510 of 20 July 1868 elevated the village to city status.

=== Official symbols ===
According to Article 3 of the 2009 Organic Law, the official symbols of the municipality are the flag, the coat of arms, and the anthem, as in most Brazilian municipalities.

=== Cinema ===
The Victor Agresta Cinematographic Screening Room has been operating since 2017.

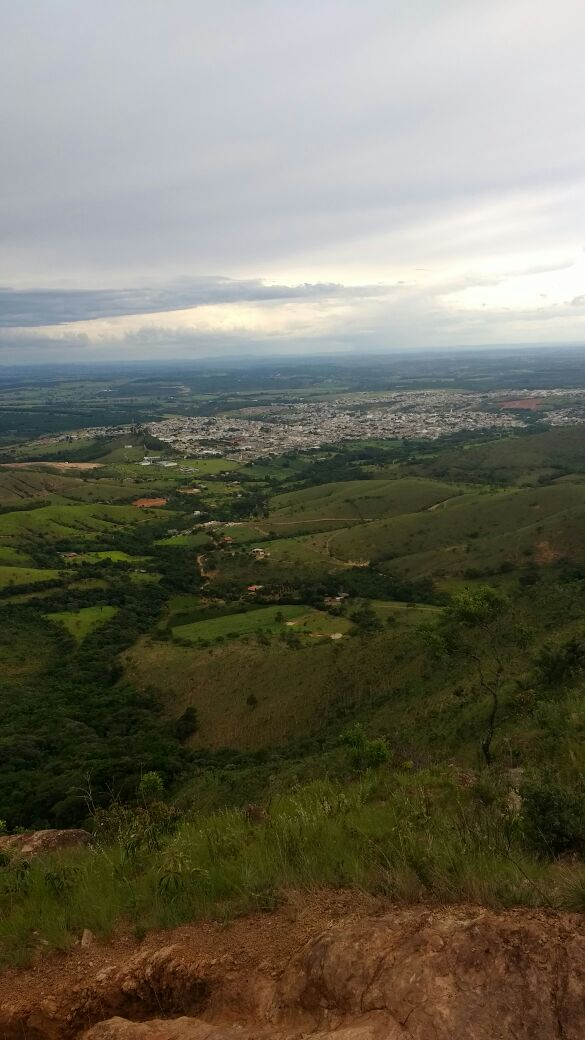
View of the city of Piumhi from the top of Serra da Pimenta.

== Geography ==
=== Location ===
Piumhi is located in the western mesoregion of the state of Minas Gerais (Central-West region), covering an area of 902 km^{2} at an altitude of 793 metres. It has a tropical climate, more precisely a tropical highland climate (Köppen: Cwa), with an average temperature of about 22 °C and Cerrado vegetation.

It shares borders with the municipalities of Doresópolis, Bambuí, São Roque de Minas, Capitólio, Pimenta, Guapé, Pains, and Vargem Bonita.

Road access to Piumhi is possible via highways MG-439, MG-354, and its main road, MG-050, which crosses the region and connects the capital Belo Horizonte to the Ribeirão Preto region in the state of São Paulo. Piumhi is located roughly halfway between these two metropolitan areas, being 256 kilometres from Belo Horizonte and 265 kilometres from Ribeirão Preto.

=== Topography ===
Piumhi is predominantly flat but is surrounded from the northeast to the southeast by the Pimenta Range, which is the highest point in the municipality at 1,256 metres, along with the Andaime Range and its extensions.

=== Piumhi River and the Cururu Swamp lands ===
The Piumhi River was a tributary of the Rio Grande until the late 1950s and early 1960s. Its stream bed formed the Cururu Swamp, an extensive flooded area where the river's visible course blended with its larger floodplain.

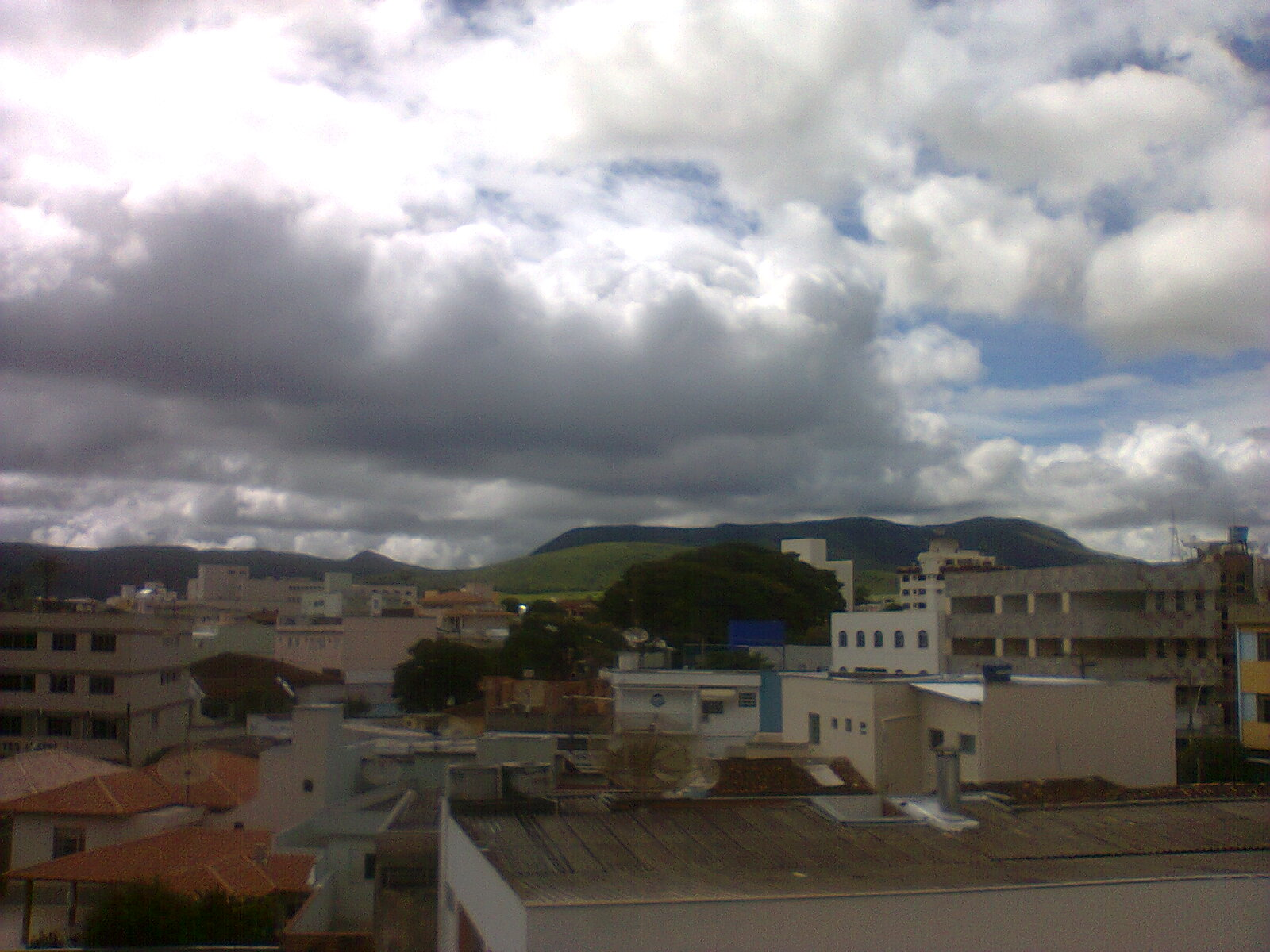
Partial view of downtown Piumhi, with Serra do Cucurute in the background.

The region was characterised by large landholdings and was historically home to sharecroppers, tenants, and rural workers until 1955, when the government intervened with the construction of the Furnas Hydroelectric Plant, in the Rio Grande basin. This development significantly altered both the landscape and the social structure of the area.

For the construction of the dam at the Furnas Hydroelectric Plant, a significant engineering project for the time, the Piumhi River was diverted from the Rio Grande basin to the São Francisco River basin. The wetland was drained, preventing the flooding of nearby cities such as Capitólio. The drainage process took several years to complete and covered an area of approximately 20,000 hectares.

The result of the drainage was the expansion of highly fertile lands, considered the most productive in the region, which eventually led to land conflicts between large landowners, who claimed the new lands as extensions of their properties, and rural workers, who settled on the land in their own way.

As the process of occupation and land disputes intensified in the 1960s, research on the region has relied primarily on historiography and oral history. The government largely sided with the landowners, despite unfulfilled promises to the peasants, according to the region's older residents. Numerous cases of violence and deaths were documented, with casualties on both sides, although, as expected, the powerful landowners ultimately prevailed.

=== Climate ===
Piumhi has a tropical climate, characterised by high precipitation during the summer and low rainfall in the winter. The average temperature is 20.6 °C, with an annual precipitation average of 1,562 millimetres.

== COVID-19 pandemic ==
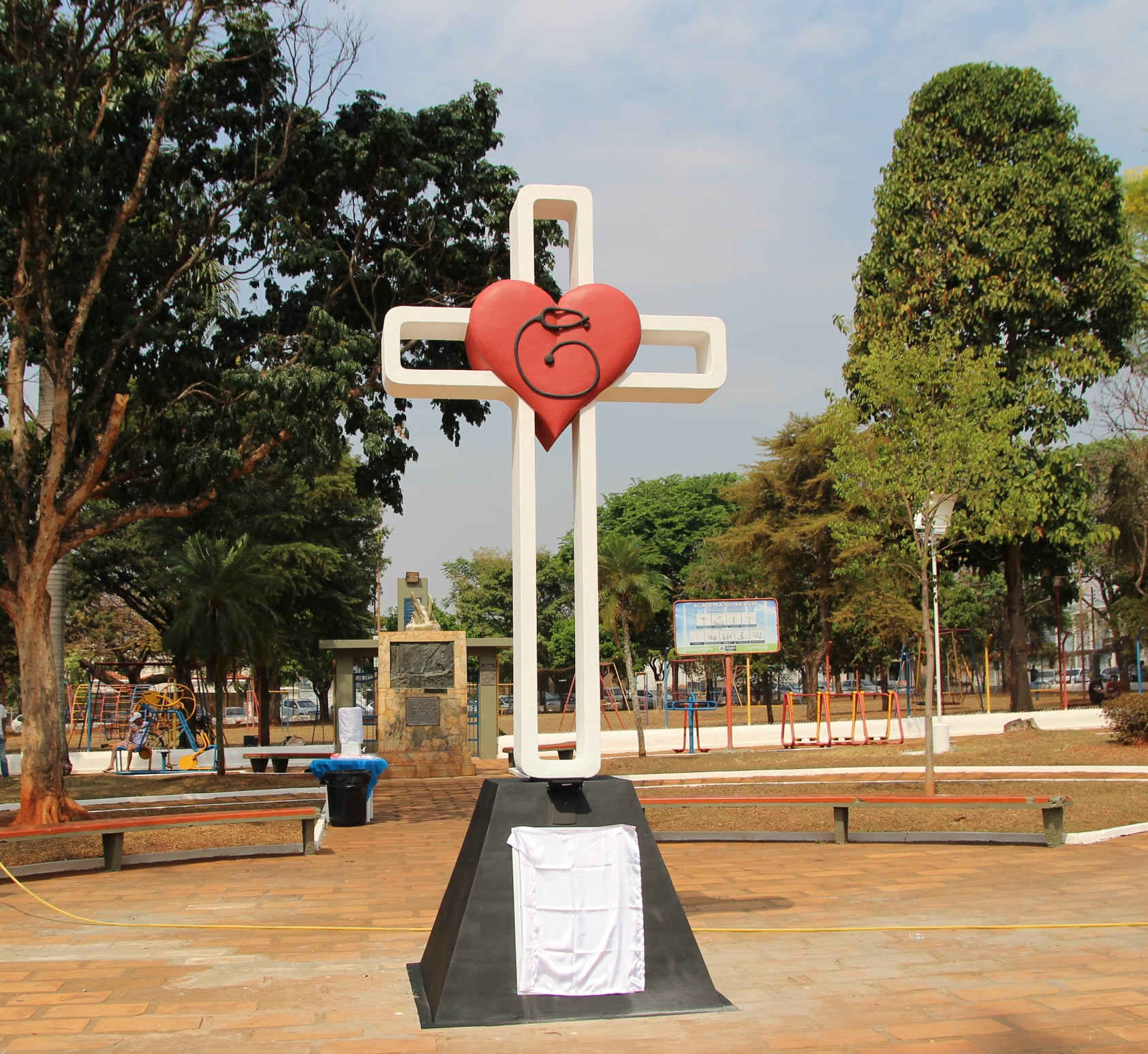
Monument honouring healthcare professionals in Piumhi, MG.

Monument

A monument was created to honour the healthcare professionals of Piumhi. The landmark is located in Guia Lopes Square (Santa Casa Square) in Piumhi, MG.

Inside the monument, there are over a thousand letters and memorabilia from this tragic period in history, which are set to be opened in 2050.

The local administration decided to create this tribute as a recognition of the services provided by the city's healthcare professionals in combating the COVID-19 pandemic.

By the day of the inauguration, the city had surpassed 100 deaths due to COVID-19.

== Economy ==
=== Agriculture and livestock ===
The municipality's economy is primarily focused on agriculture and livestock, with notable production of coffee, corn, beans, milk, and dairy products, as well as dairy and beef cattle farming.

Piumhi is considered the fifth-largest coffee-producing hub in the state of Minas Gerais. According to data from the Ministry of Development, Industry, and Foreign Trade, in 2014 Piumhi ranked first in foreign trade within the central-western region of Minas Gerais, and 282nd among all Brazilian municipalities.

Cheese tourism
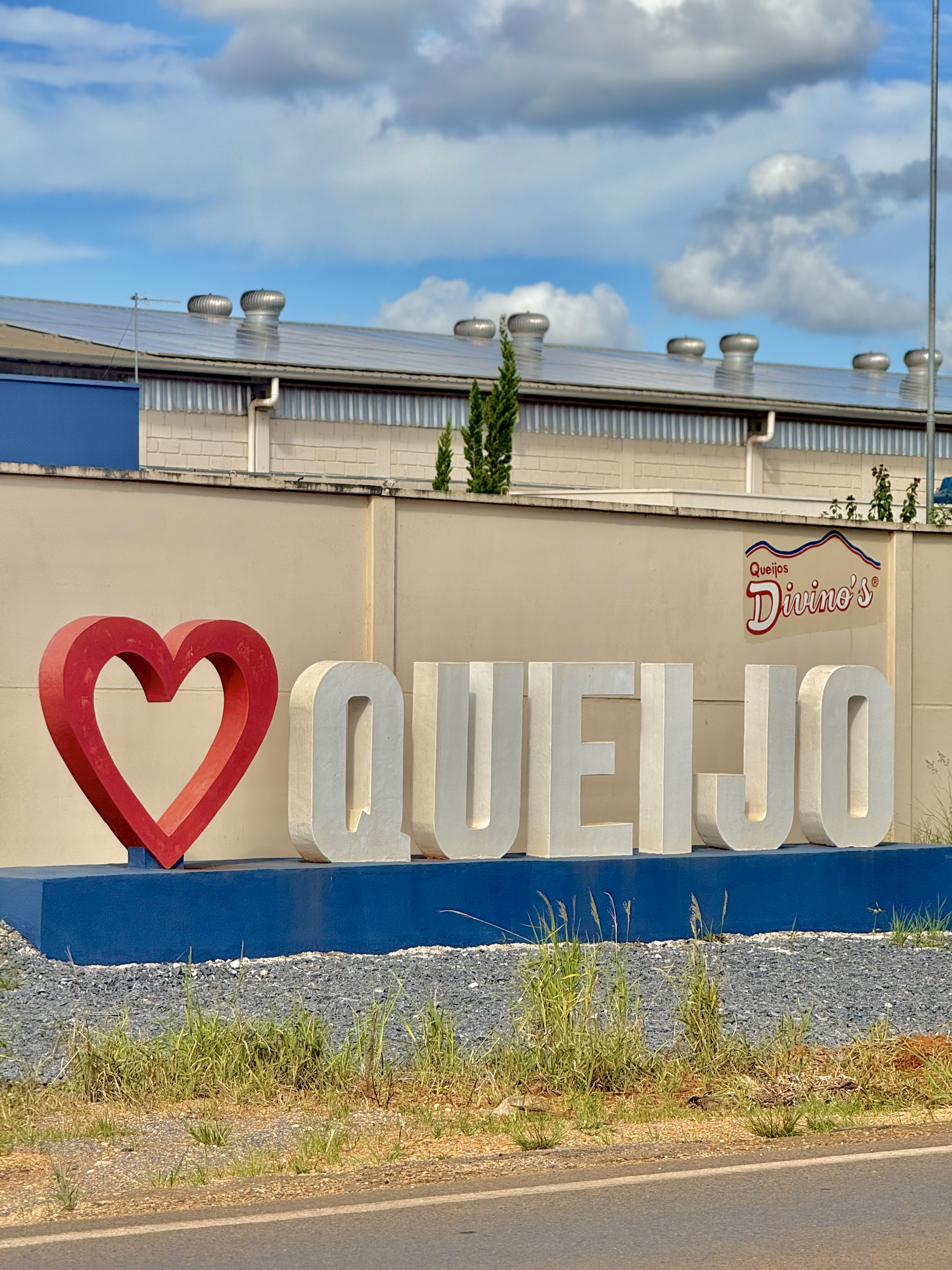
- "I Love Queijo" sign in Piumhi
- Interactive map of Cheese tourism

Piumhi is also one of the municipalities producing Canastra cheese. The registered trademark "Canastra Cheese" originates from Piumhi.

=== Tourism ===
The city features a flat topography, wide streets, and abundant greenery, which contribute to a pleasant climate. The city has several large squares, the three most notable being Praça da Matriz, Guia Lopes Square, where the hospitals are located, and Rosário Square, all of which feature landscaped gardens.

Surrounding the city are several viewpoints offering panoramic views. One of the most prominent is the Cruz do Monte viewpoint on the southern outskirts of the municipality. Access is available via a staircase with 269 steps or a parallel road for vehicles.

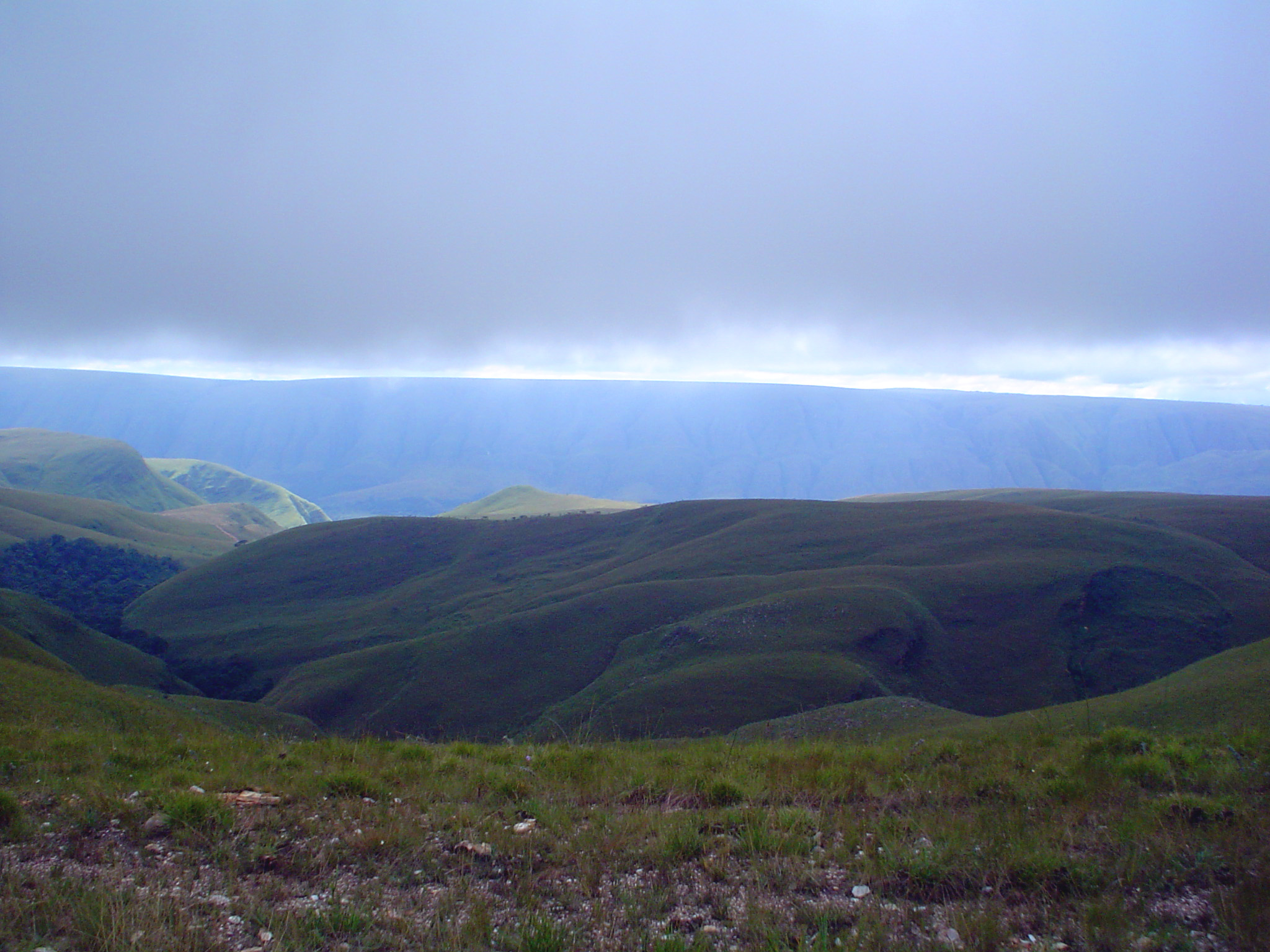
From certain points in the city, one can see parts of the plateaus of Serra da Canastra.

Another viewpoint is located in the Pimenta Range, northeast of the city, about 7 kilometres away. The upper portion of the mountain has a narrow and steep access road, making it a challenging climb. At night, observers can see the lights of nineteen surrounding cities.

Geographically, Piumhi is encircled by the Pimenta, Andaime, and Cromo mountain ranges from the northeast to the east. To the south lies the Cruz do Monte hill, while fertile cerrado lands stretch to the north and west.

In the vicinity of Piumhi, several key attractions can be found: 80 km to the west is the Serra da Canastra National Park and the source of the São Francisco River; 20 km south is the municipality of Capitólio; and 25 kilometres north, in the municipality of Pimenta, lies the lake of the Furnas Hydroelectric Plant, on the Grande River.

From east to west, the landscape around Piumhi transitions from mountains to plateaus, while the vegetation shifts from grasslands to cerrado, offering favourable topography and fertile lands throughout most of the municipality. The Piumhi region marks the beginning of the "sertões", famously described by João Guimarães Rosa in The Devil to Pay in the Backlands.

Piumhi is well-served by a considerable network of hotels, most of which are concentrated in the city centre.

=== Mining ===
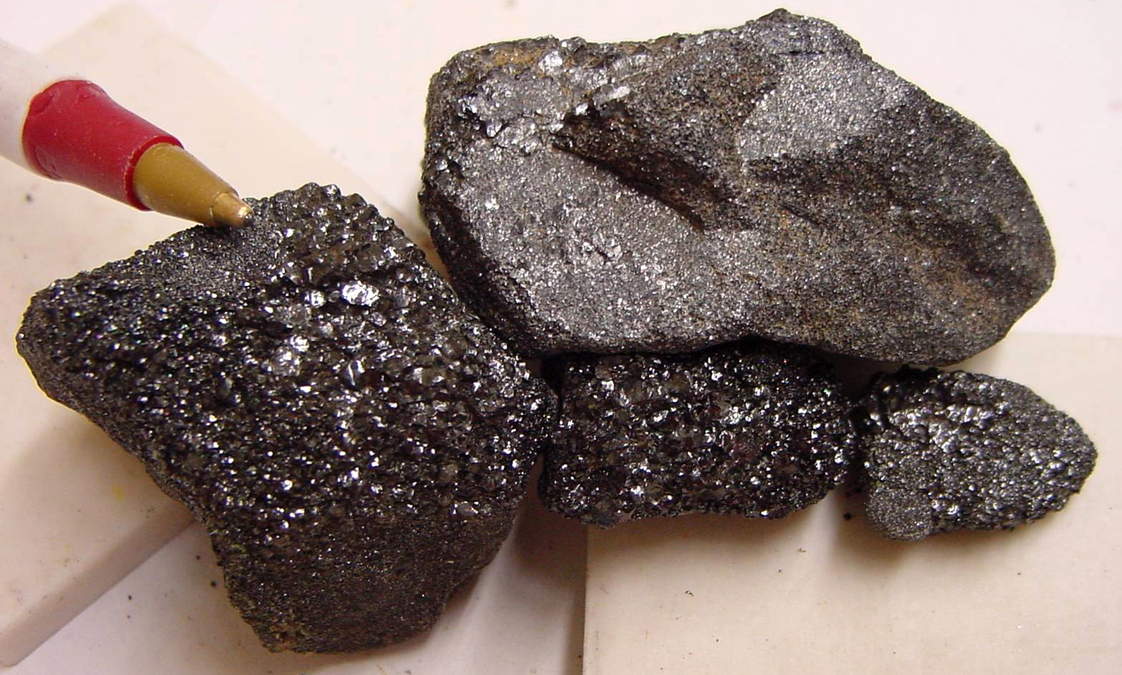
Chromium, the tenth most abundant element on Earth.

The chromite deposits and occurrences in the Piumhi region have been known and economically exploited since the 1950s. The Piumhi Massif, where chromium ore is hosted, is located on the southwestern edge of the São Francisco Craton as a structural window of the Archean to Paleoproterozoic basement, amid the Meso–Neoproterozoic rocks of the Bambuí and Canastra Groups.

This is a metavolcanosedimentary sequence of the greenstone belt type. The chromite mineralisation is classified as stratiform and is associated with serpentinised and talc-rich peridotites of the so-called Lavapés Group.

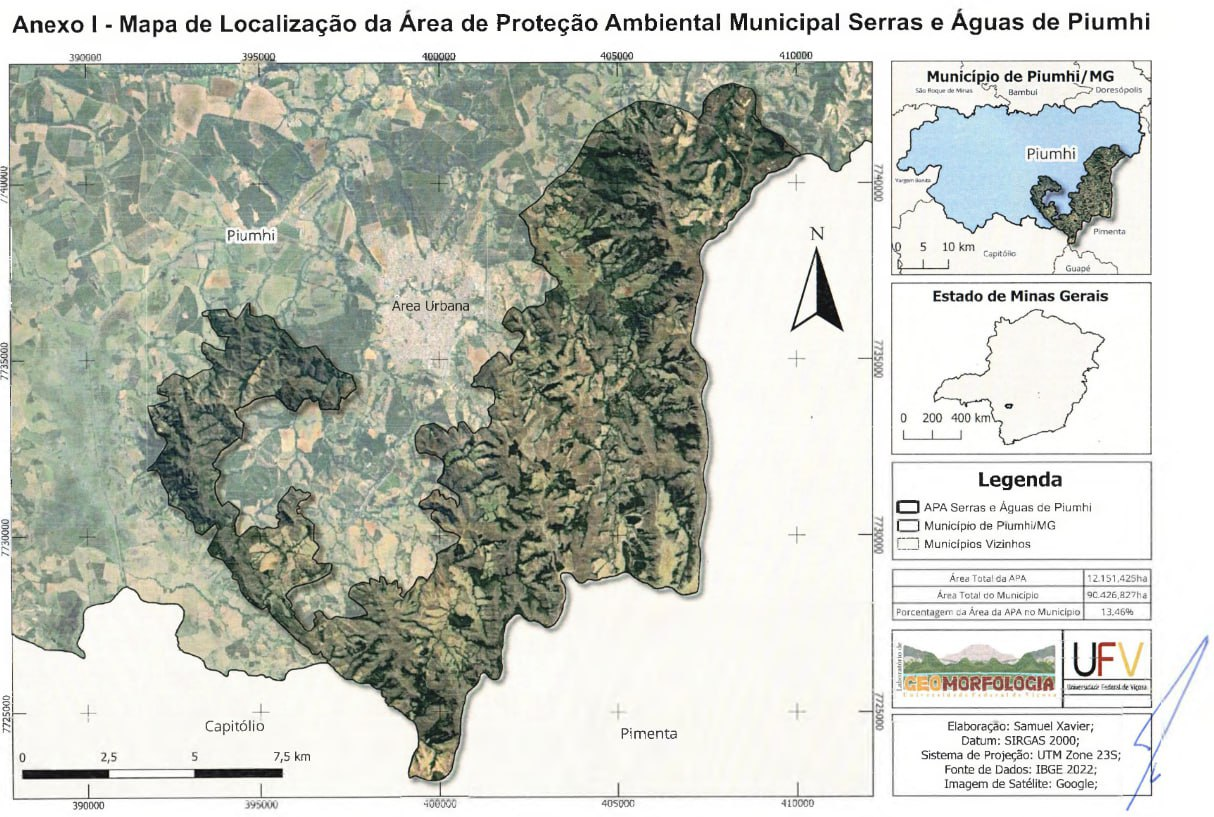
Environmental Protection Area (APA) Serras e Águas de Piumhi

== Environmental Protection Area (APA) Serras e Águas de Piumhi ==
The Environmental Protection Area (APA) Serras e Águas de Piumhi is a conservation unit located in the municipality of Piumhi, Minas Gerais, Brazil. Created by the Piumhi City Council in 2024 under Law No. 2.767/2024, the APA covers approximately 11,956 hectares, representing 73.7% of the region's native vegetation.

The APA was established to protect the groundwater recharge areas for Piumhi's public water supply, archaeological heritage, air quality, scenic beauty for ecotourism, and overall environmental quality. Among its main natural and tourist attractions are Cachoeira da Belinha, Cachoeira do Nenzico, Mirante da Belinha, Mirante da Onça, Poço do Cipó, and Poço dos Gogas.

The creation of the APA was driven by the grassroots movement Amigos do Araras e da Belinha, which emerged in 2023 in protest against imminent iron ore exploration in the Piumhi mountains. The initiative aims to preserve local biodiversity, including endangered species such as the Pirapitinga, a native fish, and a newly discovered sunflower species identified during environmental studies for the APA's creation.

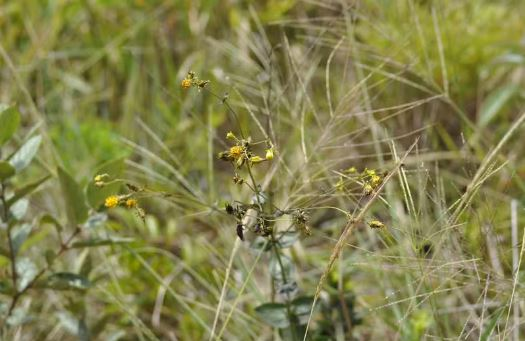
Newly discovered sunflower family species – Piumhi, MG

=== New sunflower species discovered ===
In April 2024, researchers announced the discovery of a new sunflower species in Piumhi, located in the Central-West region of Minas Gerais. The plant was found during an environmental mapping project conducted for the creation of the Environmental Protection Area (APA) Serras e Águas de Piumhi.

The research began in November 2023, and the new species was identified in March 2024 in the Cachoeira da Belinha region. The project was coordinated by the grassroots movement Amigos do Araras e da Belinha, with participation from researchers from the Federal University of Juiz de Fora (UFJF), Federal University of Viçosa (UFV), Federal University of Espírito Santo (UFES), State University of Feira de Santana (UEFS), and the National Museum.

The newly discovered species, belonging to the Asteraceae family, caught the attention of scientists due to its uniqueness and the absence of previous records. Botanist Maria Liris Barbosa da Silva, who led the species classification, highlighted the importance of the discovery for the biodiversity of Piumhi and Brazil.

== Municipal holidays ==
According to Municipal Law No. 1,281/1996, amended by Law No. 1,422/2000, the municipal holidays are as follows:

- 20 July: City Anniversary (subject to change based on administrative needs)
- 15 August: Our Lady of Deliverance, the city's patron saint
- 8 December: Our Lady of the Immaculate Conception

=== Variable dates ===
- Corpus Christi ("Body of Christ")
- Good Friday

== Infrastructure ==
=== Autonomous Water and Sewage Service – SAAE ===
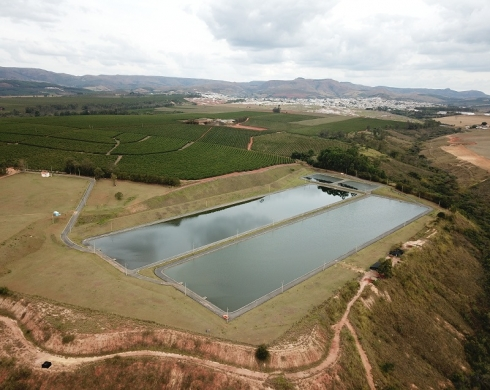
Sewage Treatment System (ETE), SAAE of Piumhi, MG.

The municipality has a well-developed infrastructure, with 100% of the city and residential areas supplied with treated water. Additionally, it has 100% coverage of sewage collection networks along public roads. The water treatment plant has a capacity of 150 L/s.

There are seven reservoirs, all supplied with properly treated water to serve the entire city's population. Piumhi also has a sewage treatment plant (ETE) and a water treatment plant (ETA), both managed by the Autonomous Water and Sewage Service (SAAE).

SAAE Piumhi was established under Municipal Law No. 1035/90 on 6 March 1990. It has been improving water and sewage systems with an efficiency rate that makes it a regional reference in basic sanitation. As a municipal authority, SAAE has administrative, legal, and financial autonomy.

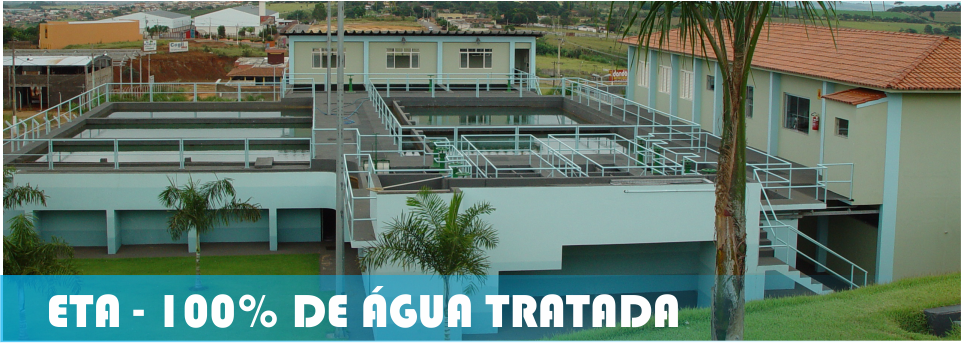
Water Treatment Plant of Piumhi (SAAE), located in the Nova Piumhi neighbourhood.

Providing essential public utility services, SAAE has contributed to the city's growth, especially in the quality of water distribution. The direct management of the Autonomous Water and Sewage Service (SAAE) is carried out by an executive board and a Technical and Administrative Committee, with responsibilities defined by law and the internal regulations of the authority. This Technical and Administrative Committee consists of five members: two appointed by the municipality and their respective substitutes, two appointed by the National Health Foundation, and the fifth member being the Mayor, who serves as the Committee's President. The administration of the agency is divided into departments.

Located in the Nova Piumhi neighbourhood, the ETA treats the water collected by SAAE and distributes it to households in Piumhi. All water collected is treated to ensure quality for the population. Situated in the rural area of Piumhi, the ETE has the capacity to treat 100% of the city's sewage, returning treated water to the environment without causing harm.

=== Communication ===
The city has a weekly newspaper, Jornal Alto São Francisco. The main mobile phone operators available in the city are Vivo, TIM, Claro, Oi, and Algar, all operating on 2G, 3G, and 4G frequencies. Vivo was the first operator to launch 5G services. There are also broadband internet providers offering both radio and fibre optic technology, covering the entire city. Currently, three radio stations operate in Piumhi: Rádio Piumhi (104.3 FM), Rádio Boa FM (87.9 FM), and Rádio Onda Oeste (100.3 FM).

=== Airport ===
"Dr. Vitrasiano Leonel Municipal Airport", identified by the ICAO code "SNUH," features a 34,440 m^{2} asphalted runway (1,148 metres in length and 30 metres in width), night lighting, operational facilities, and a passenger terminal.

=== Security ===
Piumhi is home to the 3rd Platoon of the Fire Department of Minas Gerais, located along the MG-050 Highway and subordinated to the 2nd Company of the 10th Fire Department Battalion (Divinópolis). Additionally, the city houses the 110th Military Police Company, which operates under the 12th Military Police Battalion headquartered in Passos.

- Other municipalities within its jurisdiction include Capitólio, Doresópolis, Pimenta, São Roque de Minas, and Vargem Bonita.

=== Olho Vivo surveillance program ===
Since August 2019, the Olho Vivo program has been operational in Piumhi, consisting of 27 surveillance cameras installed at strategic locations to enhance security for residents and tourists. The program is a partnership between the Piumhi municipal government, the Public Prosecutor's Office, the Municipal Economic Development Council, the Community Association for Public Security Affairs of Piumhi (ACASPO), and the Minas Gerais Military Police. The monitoring centre is located at the Piumhi Military Police Platoon.

=== Education ===
The city hosts a campus of the Federal Institute of Science and Technology of Minas Gerais (IFMG), offering a Bachelor's degree in Civil Engineering and a post-secondary technical course in Building Technology.

The city also offers vocational courses through the Pronatec program, in partnership with IFMG and the municipal government since 2013. UNOPAR also operates in the city, offering distance learning undergraduate courses. In 2015, UNIFRAN, through Cruzeiro do Sul Virtual, introduced additional distance learning programs.

Piumhi has 14 municipal schools, 5 private schools, and 4 state schools.

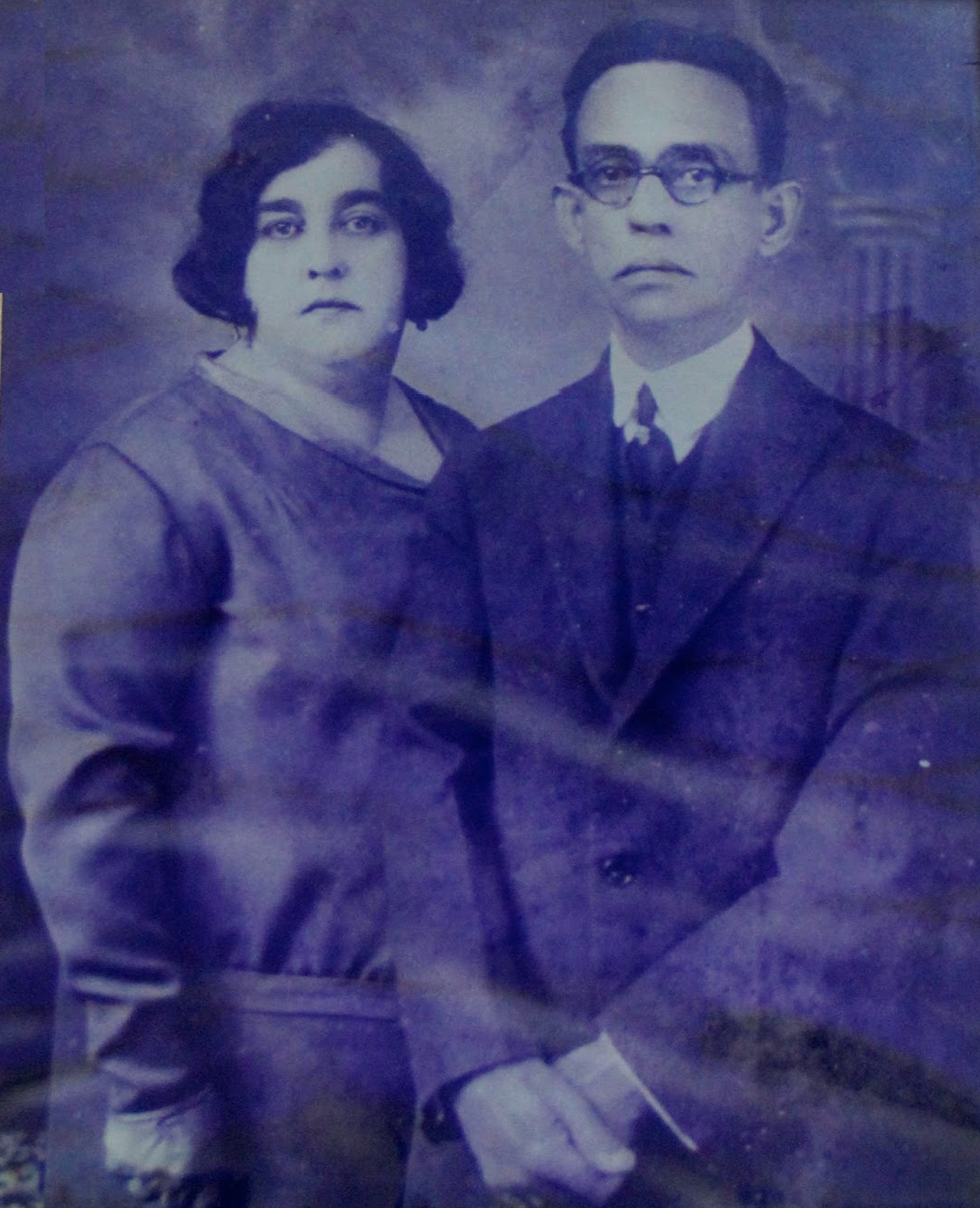
Dr. Avelino de Queiroz and his wife, Maria de Melo Queiroz.

=== Health ===
==== Santa Casa de Misericórdia de Piumhi ====
The Santa Casa de Misericórdia de Piumhi is a general, private, philanthropic hospital that serves the entire regional population. It was founded on 7 September 1900 by a group of visionary residents of Piumhi, with Dr. Avelino de Queiroz as its main founder and first physician. The hospital has 96 beds, 68 of which are funded by the Unified Health System (SUS). Additionally, 10 intensive care unit (ICU) beds were created, increasing the hospital's capacity for specialised care and allowing the incorporation of new medical specialties.

Santa Casa provides healthcare services to six municipalities in the micro-region (Piumhi, Capitólio, São Roque de Minas, Vargem Bonita, Doresópolis, and Guapé) and an additional four neighbouring cities (Pimenta, Bambuí, Pains, and Córrego Fundo), serving a total population of about 109,000. If considering the BR-050 highway area, the hospital extends services to over 200,000 people.

The emergency department of Santa Casa treats an average of 70,000 patients annually—almost twice the population of Piumhi—and admits approximately 6,000 patients per year.

=== SAMU ===
The Mobile Emergency Care Service (SAMU) began operations in Piumhi in October 2014, providing urgent and pre-hospital emergency care to the population.

== Bibliography ==
- Sampaio, Teodoro (1987). O Tupi na Geografia Nacional. Brasiliana (5th ed.). São Paulo: Editora Nacional. ISBN 978-85-87042-76-7.
- Sampaio, Teodoro (1901). O Tupi na Geografia Nacional. Salvador: Câmara Municipal de Salvador.
- Cardoso, Levy (1961). Toponímia Brasílica. Rio de Janeiro: Biblioteca do Exército.
- NAVARRO, E. A. (2013). Dictionary of Old Tupi: The Classical Indigenous Language of Brazil. São Paulo: Global. p. 595. ISBN 978-85-87042-76-7.
- Martins, Tarcísio José (2008). Quilombo do Campo Grande. Contagem: Santa Clara. p. 590. ISBN 978-85-87042-76-7.
