= Pimenta, Minas Gerais =

Brazilian municipality located in the center of the state of Minas Gerais

Coordinates: 20°29′02″S 45°47′56″W

- Municipality
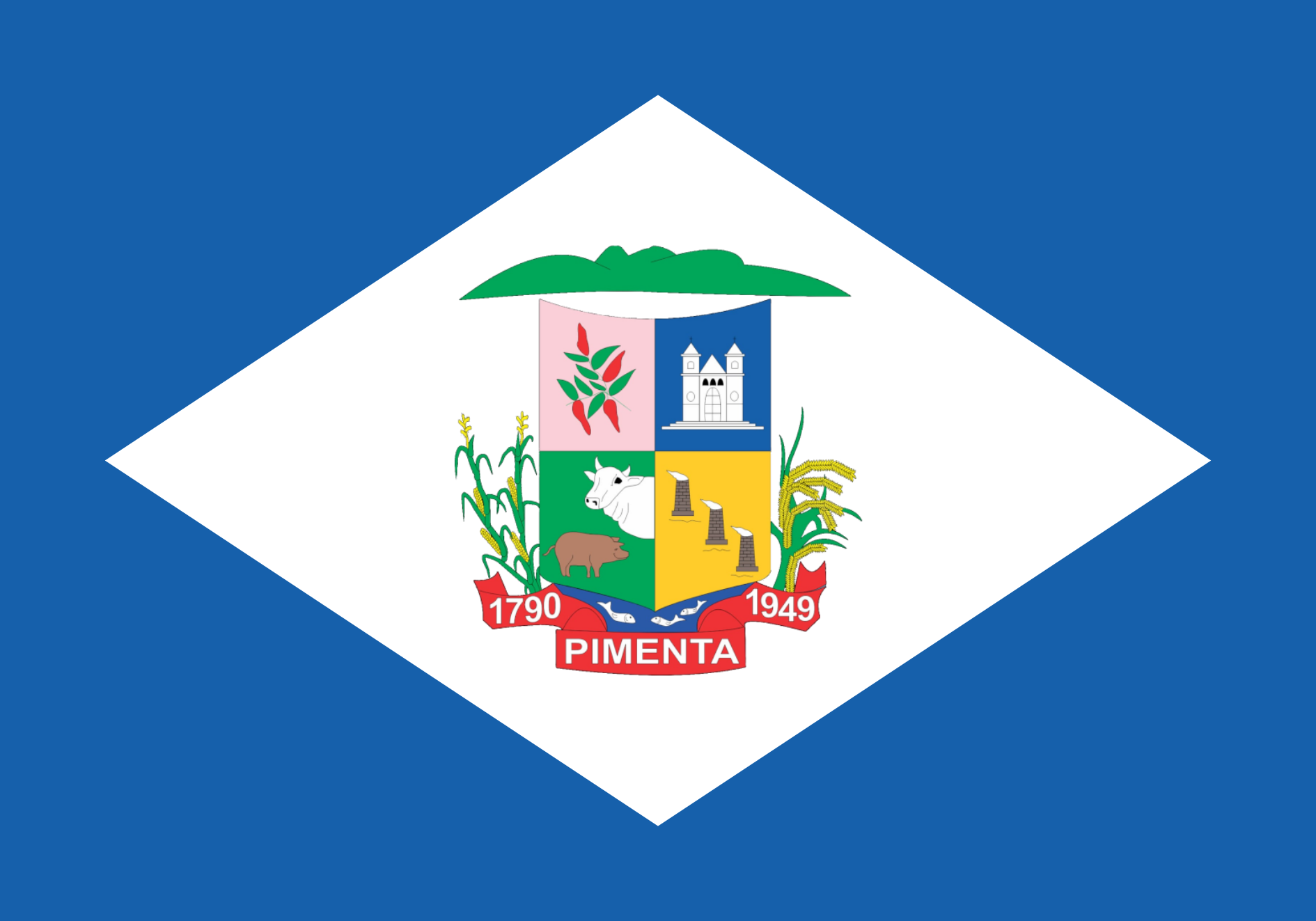
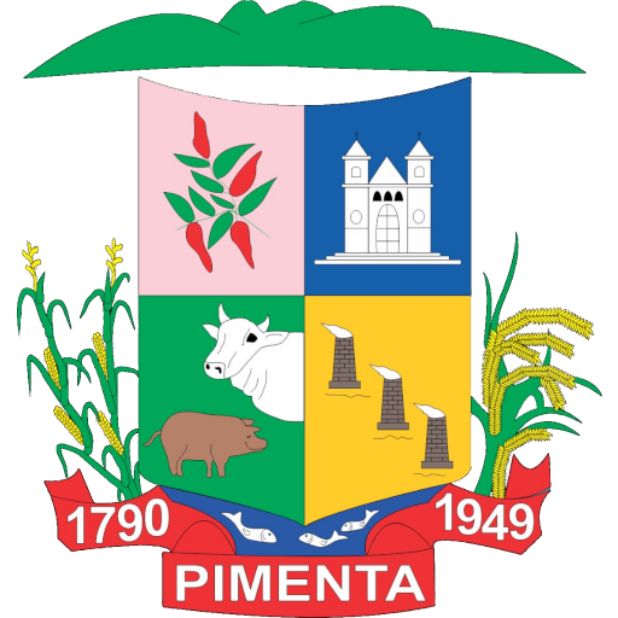
- Flag Coat of arms
- Interactive map of Pimenta, Minas Gerais
- Country: Brazil
- State: Minas Gerais
- Region: Southeast

Population (2022 Census)
  - Total: 8,563
  - Estimate (2025): 8,817
- Time zone: UTC−3 (BRT)

Location of Pimenta on a map of the state of Minas Gerais

Pimenta is a Brazilian municipality located in the center of the state of Minas Gerais. Its population as of 2025 was 8,817 people living in a total area of 415 km^{2} (160 sq mi). The city belongs to the meso-region of Oeste de Minas and to the micro-region of Formiga. It became a municipality in 1948.

== Geography ==
The city center of Pimenta is located at an elevation of 776 meters on a northern arm of the great reservoir of Furnas. Neighboring municipalities are: Pains (N), Formiga (E), Guapé, and Piumhi (W).

The distance to Belo Horizonte is 241 km. The distance to regional center Formiga is 44 km. Connections are made by state highway BR-050.

== Economic activities ==
Services and agriculture are the most important economic activities. In 2005 there were 22 small transformation industries employing 69 workers. Public administration was the biggest employer with 221 workers. The GDP in 2005 was approximately R$65 million, with 28 million reais from services, 3 million reais from industry, and 30 million reais from agriculture. There were 560 rural producers on 28,000 hectares of land. 113 farms had tractors (2006). Approximately 1,500 persons were employed in agriculture. The main crops are coffee, rice, beans, and corn. There were 14,000 head of cattle (2006).

There was one bank (2007). In the vehicle fleet there were 1,057 automobiles, 174 trucks, 185 pickup trucks, and 1,012 motorcycles (2007).

== Health and education ==
In the health sector there were 4 public health clinics and 1 hospital with 22 beds. (2005). Patients with more serious health conditions are transported to Divinópolis, Piumhi or Formiga. Educational needs of 1,550 students were met by 3 primary schools, 1 middle school, and 3 pre-primary schools.

- Municipal Human Development Index: 0.768 (2000)
- State ranking: 179 out of 853 municipalities as of 2000
- National ranking: 1377 out of 5,138 municipalities as of 2000
- Literacy rate: 88%
- Life expectancy: 73 (average of males and females)

In 2000 the per capita monthly income of R$239.00 below the state and national average of R$276.00 and R$297.00 respectively. Poços de Caldas had the highest per capita monthly income in 2000 with R$435.00. The lowest was Setubinha with R$73.00.

The highest ranking municipality in Minas Gerais in 2000 was Poços de Caldas with 0.841, while the lowest was Setubinha with 0.568. Nationally the highest was São Caetano do Sul in São Paulo with 0.919, while the lowest was Setubinha. In more recent statistics (considering 5,507 municipalities) Manari in the state of Pernambuco has the lowest rating in the country—0,467—putting it in last place.

== See also ==
- List of municipalities in Minas Gerais
