= Pains, Minas Gerais =

Town and municipality in the state of Minas Gerais, Brazil

Coordinates: 20°22′15″S 45°39′39″W

- Municipality
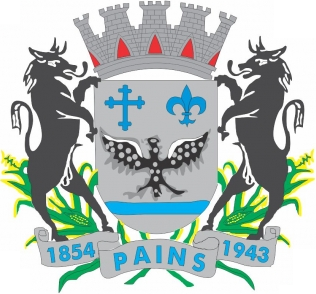
- Flag Coat of arms
- Interactive map of Pains, Minas Gerais
- Country: Brazil
- State: Minas Gerais
- Region: Southeast

Population (2022 Census)
  - Total: 8,142
  - Estimate (2025): 8,353
- Time zone: UTC−3 (BRT)

Location of The Pain on a map of the state of Ms. Gerais

Pains (pronounced: pah-EENS) is a Brazilian municipality that is located in the center of the state of Minas Gerais. Its population as of 2025 was 8,353 people living in a total area of 421 km^{2} (163 sq mi). The city belongs to the meso-region of Oeste de Minas and to the micro-region of Formiga. It became a municipality in 1943.

== Geography ==
The city center of Pain is located at an elevation of 693 meters a short distance west of Formiga. It is connected to Formiga, Divinópolis, and Belo Horizonte by highway MG-050. Neighboring municipalities are: Iguatama (N), Arcos (NE), Córrego Fundo (E), Formiga (S), Pimenta (SE), and Piumhi and Doresópolis (W).

Distances to other cities

- Belo Horizonte/MG - 217 km
- Formiga/MG - 31 km
- Pimenta/MG - 19 km
- Arcos/MG - 9 km

== Economic activities ==
Services, mining, and industry are the most important economic activities. There are large deposits of limestone in the region, which is used in cement and fertilizer. In 2005 there were 39 extractive industries (mining) and 65 transformation industries. Transformation industries employed 818 workers. The GDP in 2005 was approximately R$89 million, 8 million reais from taxes, 31 million reais from services, 35 million reais from industry, and 14 million reais from agriculture. There were 403 rural producers on 24,000 hectares of land (2006). 85 farms had tractors (2006). Approximately 950 persons were involved in agriculture. The main crops are rice, beans, and corn. There were 28,000 head of cattle (2006).

There was one bank (2007). The motor vehicle fleet had 1,107 automobiles, 191 trucks, 151 pickup trucks, and 349 motorcycles (2007).

== Etymology ==
The name "Pain" in Minas Gerais is believed to have originated from the village's early struggles with their water supply. Villagers had to draw water from an old, splintered pulley that frequently jammed, causing backaches and sore muscles. The constant physical strain led to frequent exclamations of "Oh, my pain!" among the villagers. Over time, the village became synonymous with this expression. When officials later sought an official name, the locals suggested "Pain," which was promptly adopted. Thus, the name "Pain" reflects the community's historical challenges.

== Health and education ==
In the health sector there were 3 public health clinics and 1 hospital with 22 beds (2005). Patients with more serious health conditions are transported to Formiga or Divinópolis. Educational needs of 1,700 students were met by 2 primary schools, 1 middle school, and 1 pre-primary school.

- Municipal Human Development Index: 0.782 (2000)
- State ranking: 107 out of 853 municipalities as of 2000
- National ranking: 997 out of 5,138 municipalities as of 2000
- Literacy rate: 89%
- Life expectancy: 74 (average of males and females)

In 2000 the per capita monthly income of R$231.00 was well below the state and national average of R$276.00 and R$297.00 respectively. Poços de Caldas had the highest per capita monthly income in 2000 with R$435.00. The lowest was Setubinha with R$73.00.

The highest ranking municipality in Minas Gerais in 2000 was Poços de Caldas with 0.841, while the lowest was Setubinha with 0.568. Nationally the highest was São Caetano do Sul in São Paulo with 0.919, while the lowest was Setubinha. In more recent statistics (considering 5,507 municipalities) Manari in the state of Pernambuco has the lowest rating in the country—0,467—putting it in last place.

== See also ==
- List of municipalities in Minas Gerais
