= Vargem Bonita =

Brazilian municipality located in the west of the state of Minas Gerais

Coordinates: 20°19′37″S 46°21′57″W

- Municipality
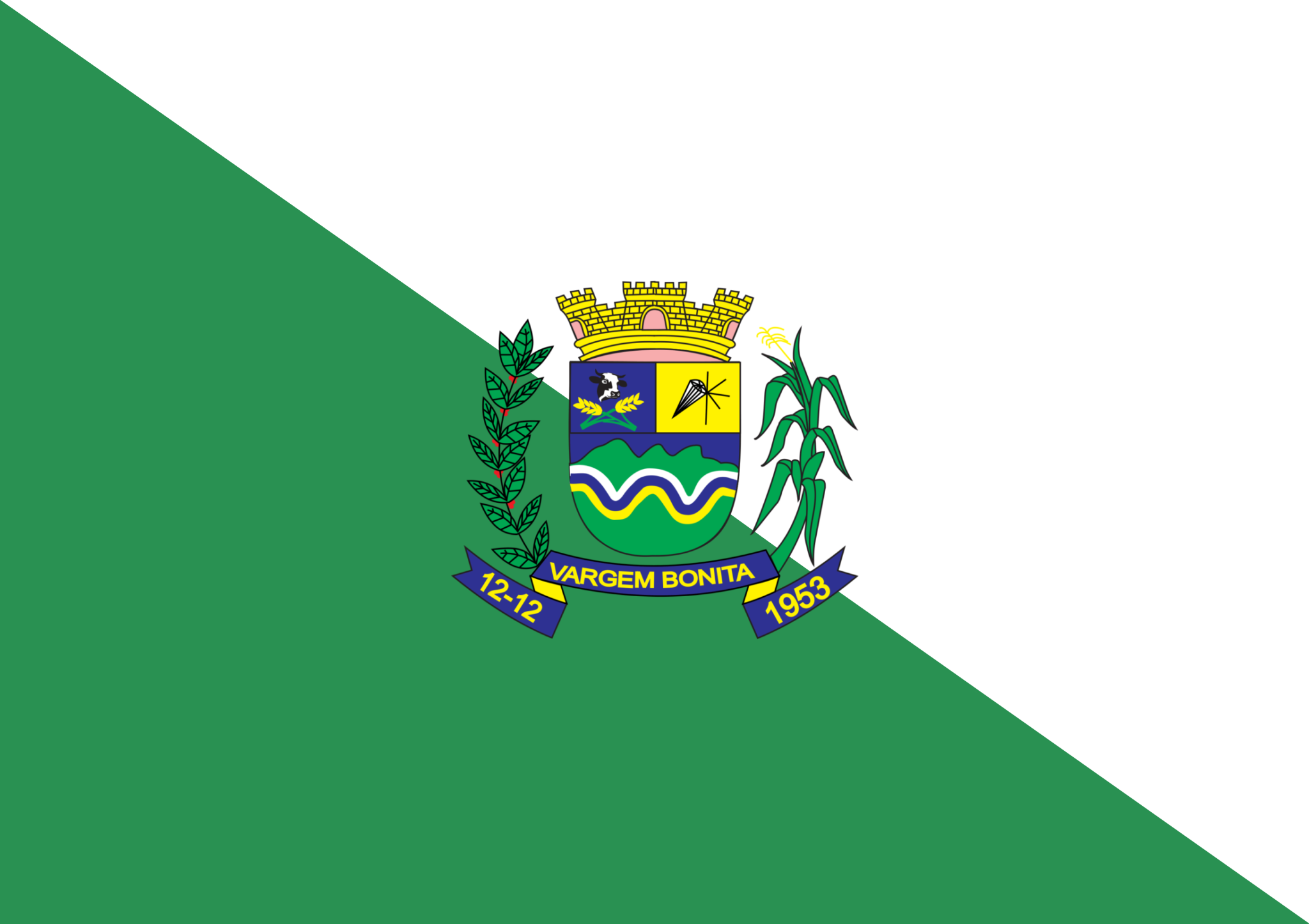
- Flag
- Interactive map of Vargem Bonita
- Country: Brazil
- State: Minas Gerais
- Region: Southeast
- Time zone: UTC−3 (BRT)

Location of Vargem Bonita on a map of the state of Minas Gerais

Vargem Bonita is a Brazilian municipality located in the west of the state of Minas Gerais. Its population as of 2020 was 2,148 people living in a total area of 409 km^{2} (158 sq mi). The city belongs to the meso-region of Oeste de Minas and to the micro-region of Piumhi. It became a municipality in 1953.

== Geography ==
The city center of Vargem Bonita is located at an elevation of 768 meters just outside the Serra da Canastra National Park. The São Francisco River passes by the town after it descends from the Serra da Canastra. Neighboring municipalities are: São Roque de Minas (N), Piumhi and Capitólio (E), São João Batista do Glória (S), and Delfinópolis (W).

The distance to Belo Horizonte is 322 km. The distance to the closest regional center Passos is 80 km. Highway connections are made by BR-146, which was unpaved in 2002.

== History and origin of the name ==
The town began with the discovery of diamonds and once had as many as 30,000 inhabitants. When the diamonds ran out the town lost population and has only become more prosperous in recent years with tourism attracted by the Sierra da Canastra National Park. The slogan for the town is "Tourism, the new diamond of Vargem Bonita".

The origin of the name of the town is rather original. According to tradition, there was a ranch called Várzea in the decade of the 1940s. The word "várzea" refers to the banks of the rivers, often flooded, and sought after by farmers for planting rice and corn.

The story goes that this ranch was praised by a friend of the owner who said: "Mas que vargem bonita!", instead of "várzea bonita". In the local dialect "vargem" is a synonym for "várzea". The owner, José Alves Ferreira, liked the word so much that he changed the name of his ranch, which later became the site of the town.

== Economic activities ==
Services and agriculture are the most important economic activities. The GDP in 2005 was approximately R$17 million, 7 million reais from services, one half million reais from industry, and 8 million reais from agriculture. There were 220 rural producers on 22,000 hectares of land. 70 farms had tractors (2006). Approximately 450 persons were involved in agriculture. The main crops are coffee and corn. There were 15,000 head of cattle (2006).

There were no banks (2007) and 192 automobiles (2007), giving a ratio of 10 inhabitants per automobile.

Working population by sector

- Transformation industries (7 units): 19 workers
- Commerce (26 units): 42 workers

== Health and education ==
In the health sector there were 3 public health clinics (2005). Patients with more serious health conditions are transported to Passos. Educational needs of 440 students were met by 3 primary schools, 1 middle school, and 3 pre-primary schools.

- Municipal Human Development Index: 0.760 (2000)
- State ranking: 205 out of 853 municipalities as of 2000
- National ranking: 1573 out of 5,138 municipalities as of 2000
- Literacy rate: 881%
- Life expectancy: 72 (average of males and females)

In 2000 the per capita monthly income of R$210.00 was below the state and national average of R$276.00 and R$297.00 respectively. Poços de Caldas had the highest per capita monthly income in 2000 with R$435.00. The lowest was Setubinha with R$73.00.

The highest ranking municipality in Minas Gerais in 2000 was Poços de Caldas with 0.841, while the lowest was Setubinha with 0.568. Nationally the highest was São Caetano do Sul in São Paulo with 0.919, while the lowest was Setubinha. In more recent statistics (considering 5,507 municipalities) Manari in the state of Pernambuco has the lowest rating in the country—0,467—putting it in last place.

== See also ==
- List of municipalities in Minas Gerais
