= Capitólio =

Municipality in Minas Gerais, Brazil

- Municipality
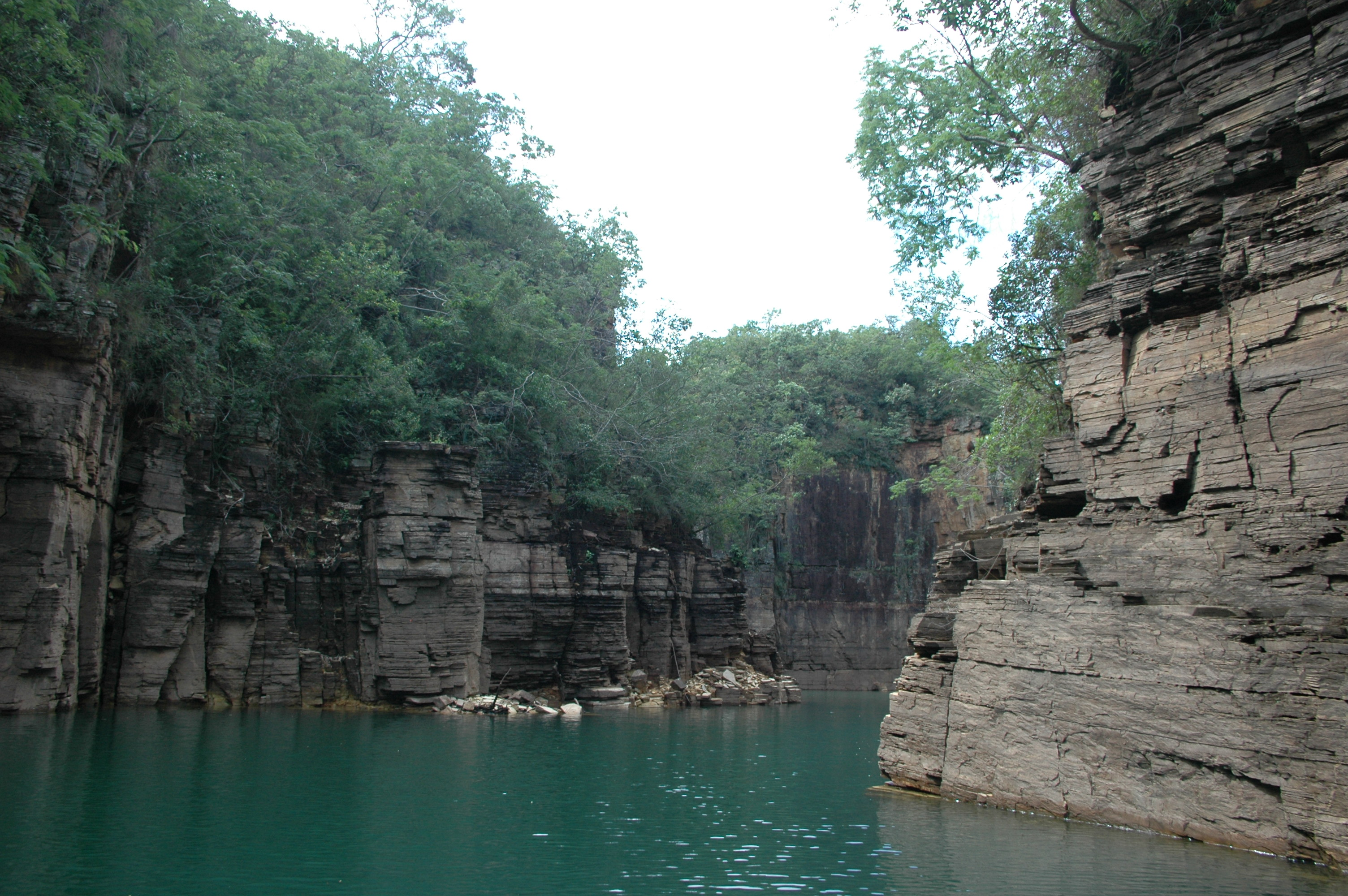
- View of Capitólio

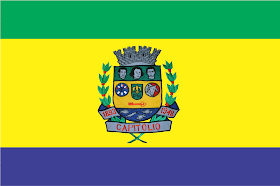
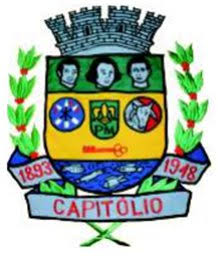
- Flag Coat of arms

- Location in Minas Gerais

- Location in Brazil
- Coordinates: 20°36′54″S 46°03′00″W
- Country: Brazil
- Region: Southeast
- State: Minas Gerais
- Intermediate region: Varginha
- Immediate region: Piumhi
- District created: 7 September 1923
- Municipality created: 27 December 1948
- Installed: 1 January 1949
- District: Capitólio

Government
  - Mayor: Jaime Leonel Sobrinho (2026–2028) (NOVO)

Area
  - Total: 521.802 km^{2} (201.469 sq mi)

Population (2022)
  - Total: 10,380
  - Estimate (2025): 10,991
  - Density: 19.89/km^{2} (51.52/sq mi)
- Demonym: capitolino

Socioeconomic indicators
  - HDI (2010): 0.710
  - GDP per capita (2023): R$42,758.08
- Time zone: UTC−3 (BRT)
- Postal code: 37930-000
- Area code: 37
- Website: www.capitolio.mg.gov.br

Capitólio is a municipality in southwestern Minas Gerais, Brazil. It belongs to the Immediate Geographic Region of Piumhi and the Intermediate Geographic Region of Varginha. The municipality covers 521.802 km^{2} (201.469 sq mi). Its population was 10,380 in the 2022 census and was estimated at 10,991 in 2025.

The town grew from a nineteenth-century farming settlement called Arraial dos Franciscos. A chapel to Saint Sebastian was built after Pedro Messias da Cunha donated land to the community in 1895, and the settlement became São Sebastião dos Franciscos. Capitólio became a district in 1923 and a municipality in 1948.

Furnas Reservoir reaches into the municipality through valleys cut into quartzite. Boat excursions, overlooks, and waterfalls around the reservoir form the basis of the local tourism industry.

== History ==
Farms began to spread through the area then called Mata do Rio Piumhi during the early nineteenth century. Around 1830, the brothers João Francisco, Manoel Francisco, and Antônio Francisco settled near the site of the present town. Houses gathered around their properties, and the settlement became known as Arraial dos Franciscos.

Pedro Messias da Cunha arrived in 1893 and acquired land near the settlement. In 1895, he donated a parcel for a chapel to Saint Sebastian. The chapel became the center of the settlement, which took the name São Sebastião dos Franciscos.

State Law No. 843 created the district of Capitólio on 7 September 1923. The district was detached from Piumhi and attached to the newly created municipality of Guapé. Capitólio became a vila in 1939. State Decree-Law No. 1,058 transferred the district from Guapé to Piumhi in 1943.

State Law No. 336 separated Capitólio from Piumhi and created the municipality on 27 December 1948. The new administrative division took effect on 1 January 1949.

Construction of the Furnas hydroelectric plant began in July 1958. Its first generating unit entered service in September 1963. The reservoir and the Capitólio Dike changed the waterways near the town. A canal was built to carry water from the Piumhi valley past the dike, while reservoir water entered valleys cut through the surrounding quartzite.

On 8 January 2022, a block of quartzite fell from a canyon wall onto tourist boats in Furnas Reservoir, killing ten people.

== Geography ==
Capitólio covers 521.802 km^{2} (201.469 sq mi) in southwestern Minas Gerais. It borders Vargem Bonita, Piumhi, Pimenta, Guapé, São José da Barra, and São João Batista do Glória.

Furnas Reservoir occupies part of the municipality. Near the boundary with São José da Barra, streams eroded narrow valleys along intersecting fractures in quartzite of the Araxá Group. Reservoir water later entered these valleys, forming the Furnas Canyons. Their walls rise between about 20 and 60 m (66 and 197 ft) above the water.

The Capitólio Dike separates the reservoir from lower ground in the Piumhi valley. A reflux canal carries water away from the dike through Capitólio and Piumhi.

== Economy ==
Tourism around Furnas Reservoir provides work in boat excursions, lodging, restaurants, marinas, and outdoor recreation. Farming, commerce, and other services also form part of the municipal economy.

The municipality's GDP per capita was R$42,758.08 in 2023.

== Tourism ==
The Furnas Canyons lie near the eastern edge of the municipality. Their quartzite walls follow fracture systems eroded by running water before the construction of Furnas Dam. Waterfalls descend from the surrounding plateau into the flooded valleys.

The canyons can be reached by boat from ports along Furnas Reservoir and viewed from an overlook near the MG-050 highway. Other recreation around the reservoir includes boating, trails, waterfalls, and the lakeside development of Escarpas do Lago.

== See also ==
- Capitólio rockfall
- List of municipalities in Minas Gerais
