= Serra da Canastra National Park =

National park in Minas Gerais, Brazil

- Parque Nacional da Serra da Canastra
- IUCN category II (national park)
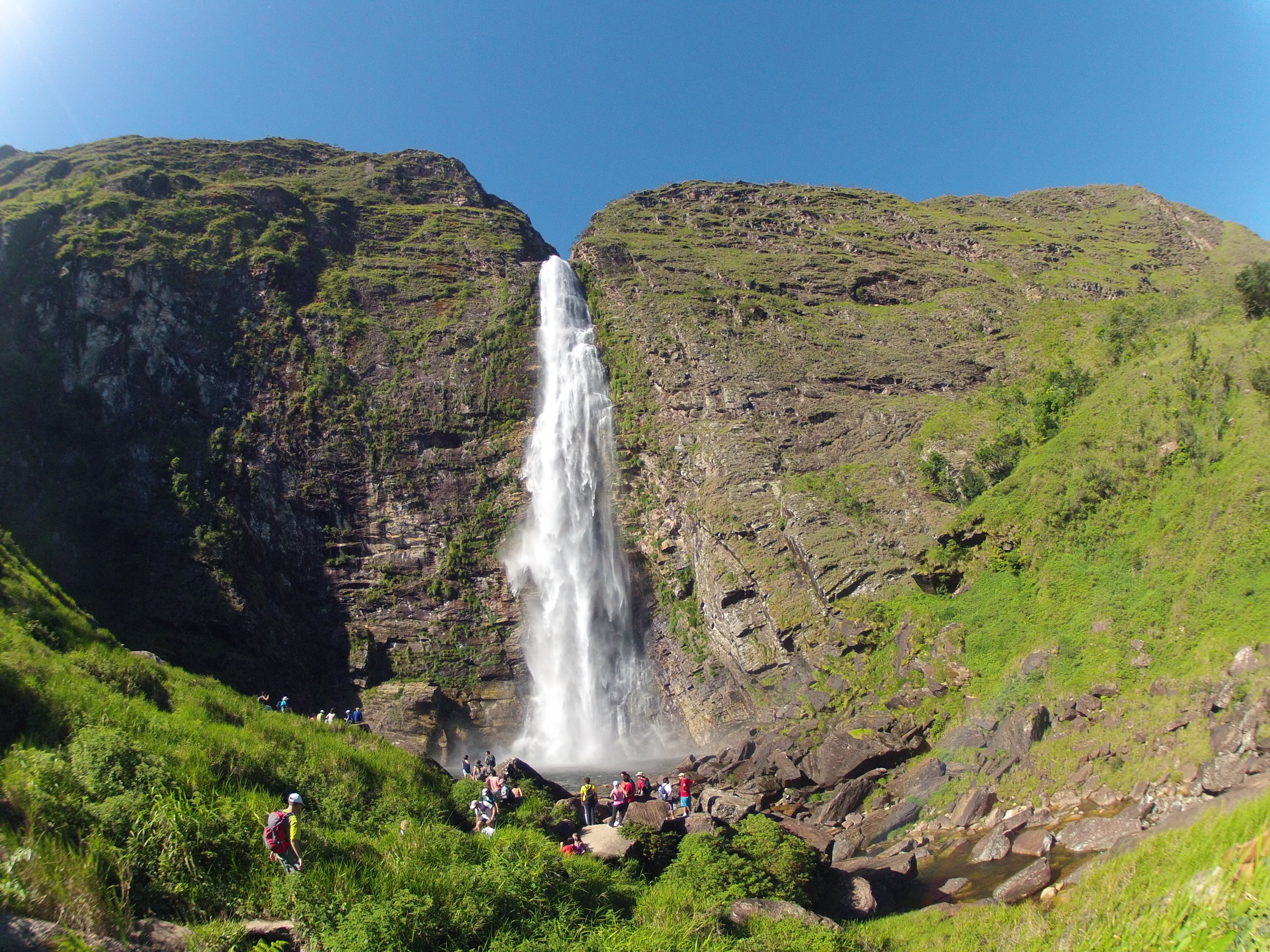
- Casca d'Anta Waterfall

- Location within Brazil
- Nearest city: Passos, Minas Gerais
- Coordinates: 20°16′S 46°37′W
- Area: 197,810 hectares (488,800 acres)
- Designation: National park
- Created: 3 April 1972
- Administrator: ICMBio

Serra da Canastra National Park (Portuguese: Parque Nacional da Serra da Canastra) is a national park in the Canastra Mountains of the state of Minas Gerais, Brazil.

== Location ==
Serra da Canastra National Park is in the south west of Minas Gerais to the north of Rio Grande. It is in the Cerrado biome. The park was created by decree 70.355 on 3 April 1972, with 197,810 hectares (488,800 acres). It is administered by the Chico Mendes Institute for Biodiversity Conservation (ICMBio). It lies in the municipalities of São Roque de Minas, Sacramento, Capitólio, Vargem Bonita, São João Batista do Glória and Delfinópolis in the state of Minas Gerais. As of 2016 only 70,000 hectares (170,000 acres) of the park in the tableland of Canastra had been regularized, with former owners indemnified.

== Topology ==
The park lies on the watershed between the São Francisco and Paraná rivers. It preserves the headwaters of the São Francisco River, which flows east from the park. In the south it feeds the Rio Grande (Paraná River tributary) and in the north the Araguari River, which rises in the park and is a tributary of the Paranaíba River. The Rio Grande and Paranaíba flow west and join to form the Paraná.

Altitude ranges from 750 to 1,490 metres (2,460 to 4,890 ft). A road cuts through the highest part of the park from east to west for more than 60 kilometres (37 mi). The park includes areas of scenic beauty such as cliffs with dramatic waterfalls, including the Casca d'Anta, the first waterfall of the São Francisco River, with a drop of 186 metres (610 ft). Other attractions are the Garagem de Pedras and the Curral de Pedras. Lookout points can be accessed by car via dirt roads in good weather. The highest peaks are almost 1,500 metres (4,900 ft).

== Environment ==
Temperatures range from 1 to 29 °C (34 to 84 °F) and average 18 °C (64 °F). Average annual rainfall is 1,250 millimetres (49 in).

Vegetation is mostly rocky fields and cerrado, with clumps of riparian forest in the valleys and ravines.

There are 45 endemic species of flora. These include members of the genera Hololepis, Inulopsis, Aspilia, Senecio, Stomatanthes, Campuloclinium, Stevia, Chinolaena, Chrysolaena, Ichtthyothere, Lessigianthus, Sinningia, Eriope, Habranthus, Ilex, Agalinis and Eryngium. Flora also include Barbacenia fulva, Barbacenia lymansmithii, Chaetostoma canastrensis, Miconia angelana, Microlicia canastrensis, Microlicia flava, Microlicia scoparia, Microlicia sp. nov, Svitramia sp. and Tibouchina sp. nov..

Fauna include bush dog, pampas deer, maned wolf, giant anteater, Neotropical otter, titi, giant armadillo (Priodontes maximus), cougar, Brazilian merganser, king vulture, toco toucan (Ramphastos toco), guan, crested caracara (Caracara plancus), greater rhea and red-legged seriema. Endemic herpetofauna are Hyla ibitiguara, Cinax canastrensis and Odontophrynus sp.

== Conservation ==
The park is classified as IUCN protected area category II (national park). It has the objectives of preserving natural ecosystems of great ecological relevance and scenic beauty, enabling scientific research, environmental education, outdoor recreation and eco-tourism.

Protected birds include the cock-tailed tyrant (Alectrurus tricolor), vinaceous-breasted amazon (Amazona vinacea), black-masked finch (Coryphaspiza melanotis), Brazilian merganser (Mergus octosetaceus), lesser nothura (Nothura minor) and the dwarf tinamou (Taoniscus nanus).

Other protected species include the maned wolf (Chrysocyon brachyurus), cougar (Puma concolor), oncilla (Leopardus tigrinus), ocelot (Leopardus pardalis), colocolo (Leopardus colocolo), giant armadillo (Priodontes maximus), giant anteater (Myrmecophaga tridactyla) and the frog Phyllomedusa ayeaye.

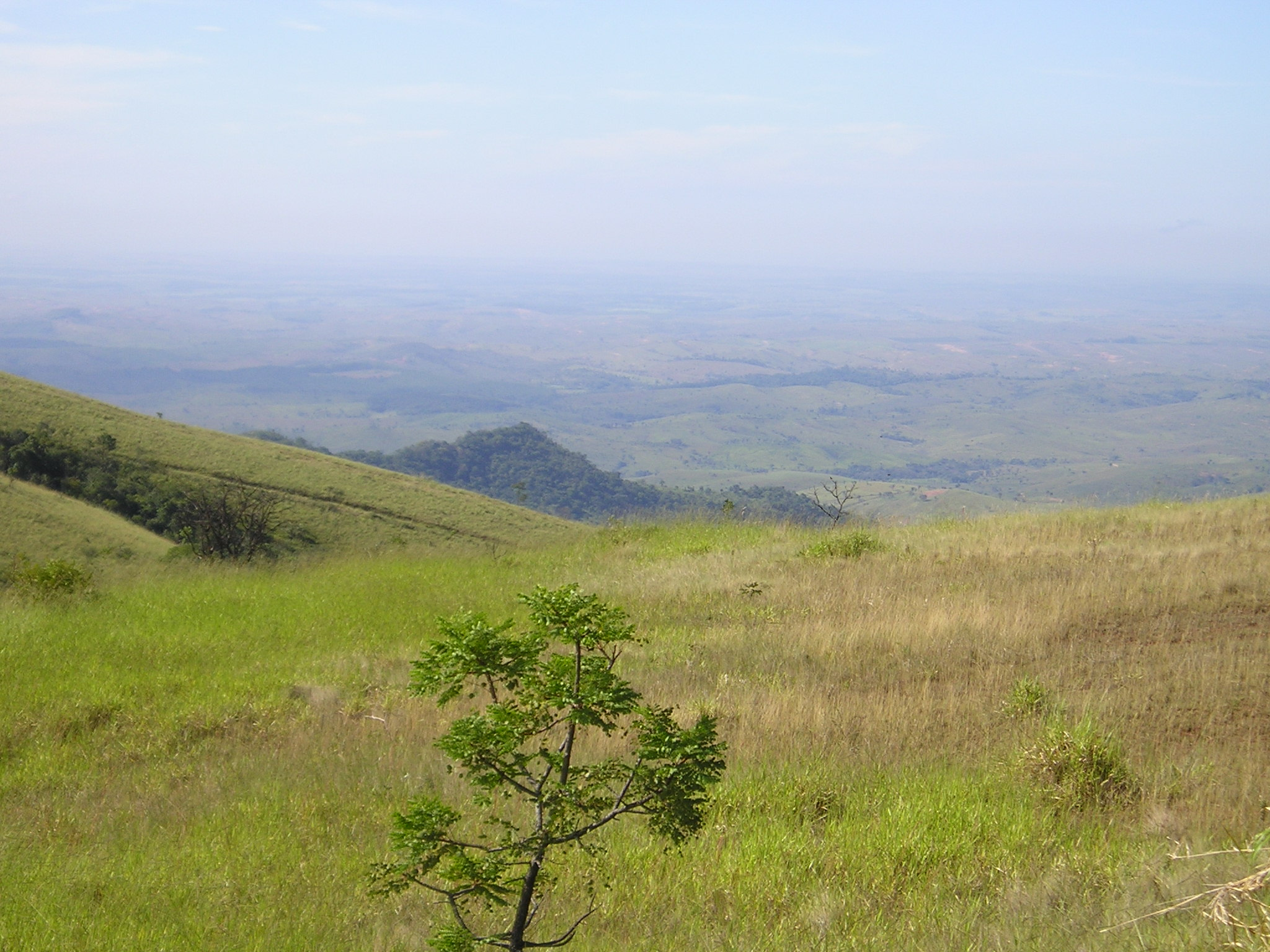

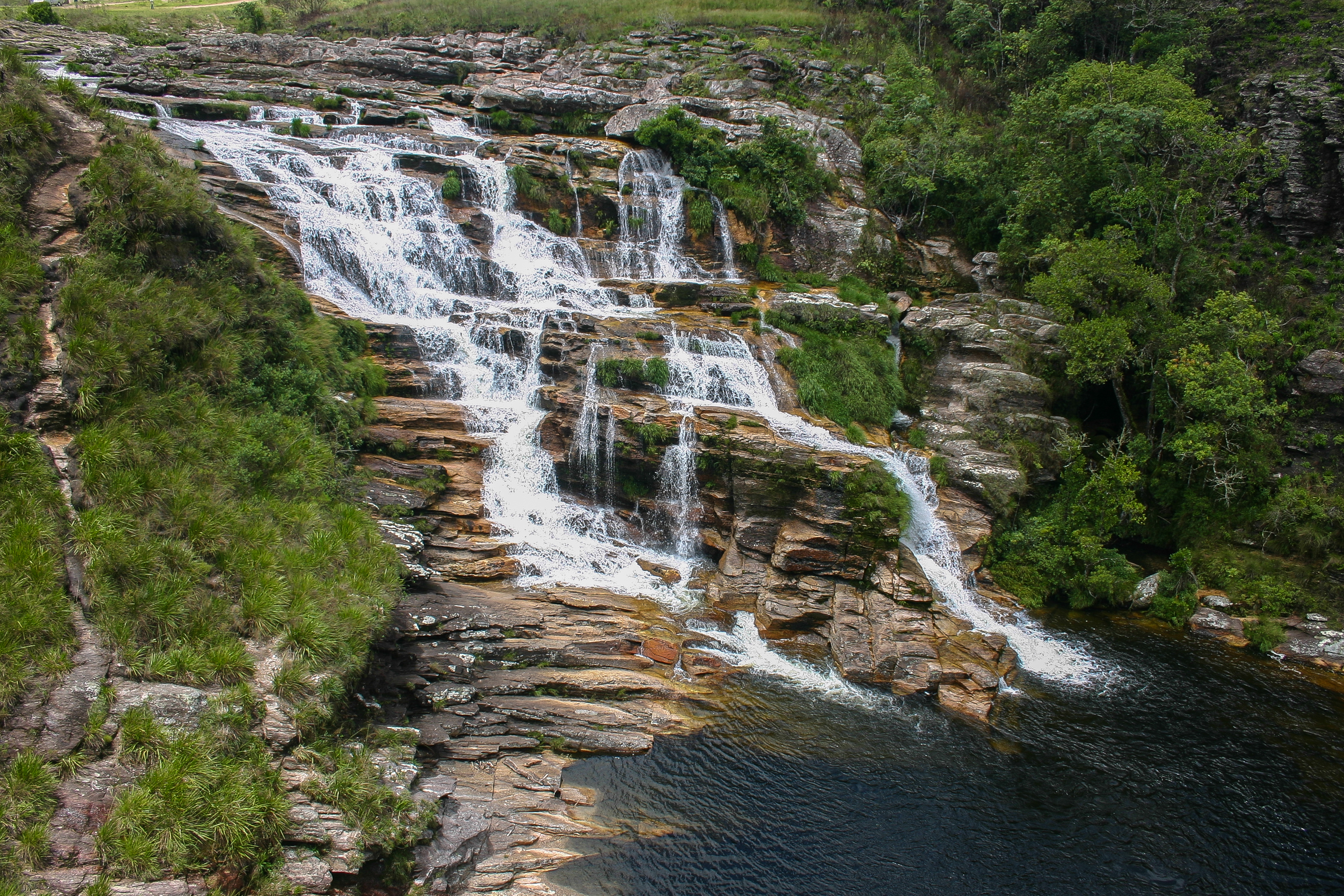
São Francisco waterfall

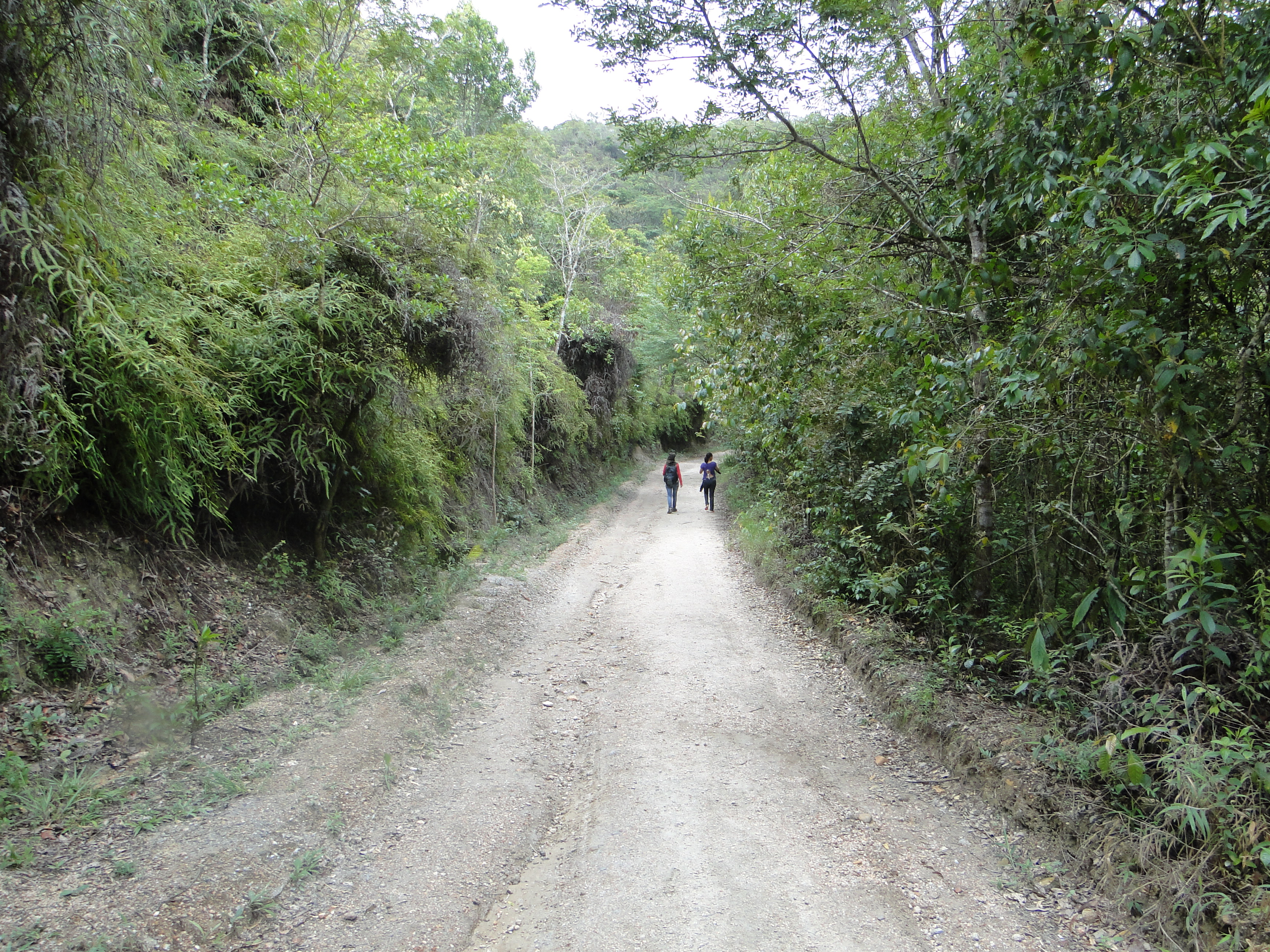
Road to Casca d'Anta

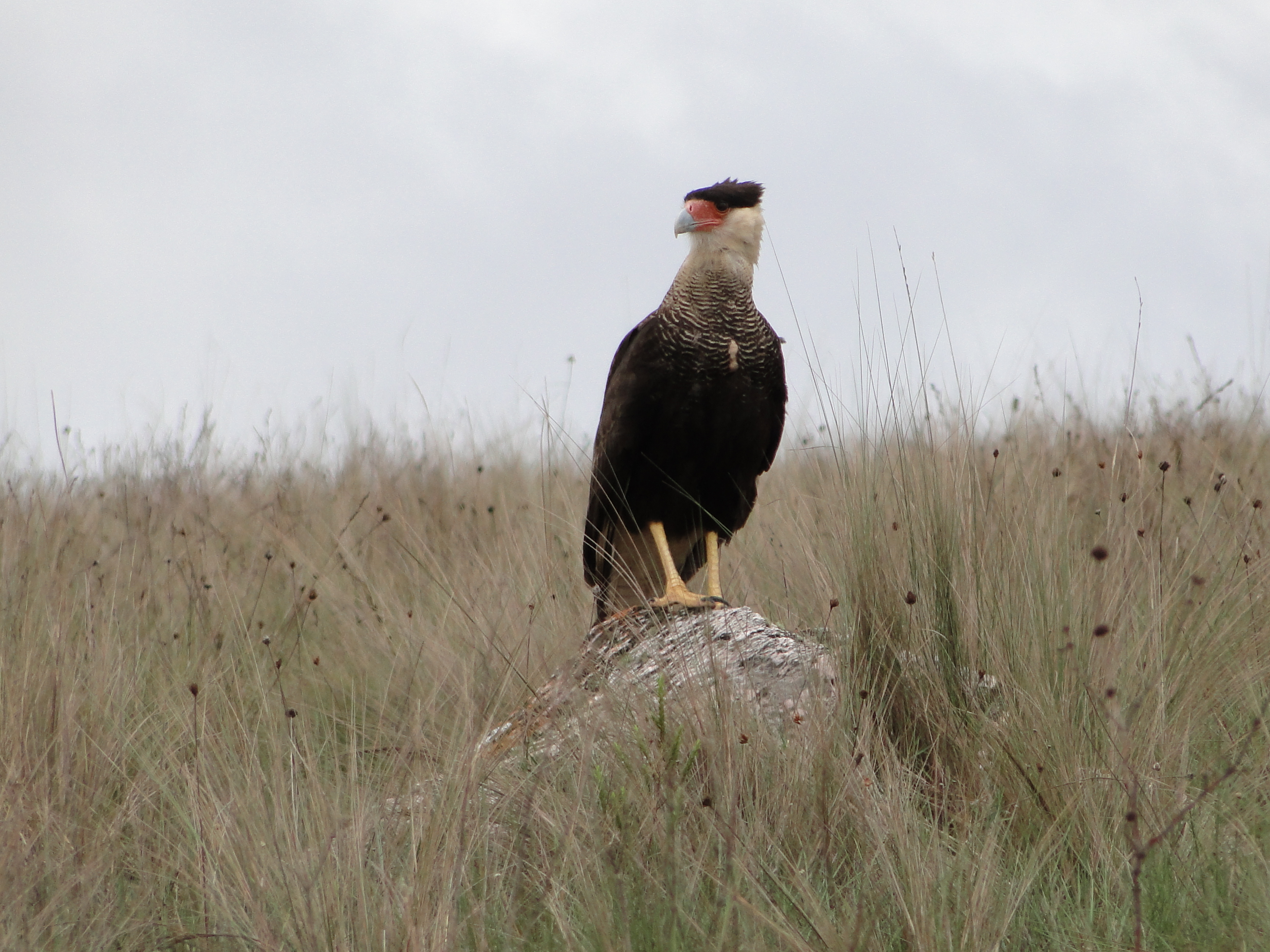
Crested caracara in the park

== Sources ==
- Parque Nacional da Serra da Canastra (in Portuguese), Chico Mendes Institute for Biodiversity Conservation, archived from the original on 2016-03-03
- Parque Nacional da Serra da Canastra (in Portuguese), Fazenda Passaredo
- Parque Nacional da Serra da Canastra (in Portuguese), ICMBio, archived from the original on 2019-03-30
- Unidade de Conservação: Parque Nacional da Serra da Canastra (in Portuguese), MMA: Ministério do Meio Ambiente
