= São Roque de Minas =

Brazilian municipality located in the west of the state of Minas Gerais

Coordinates: 20°14′42″S 46°21′57″W

- Municipality
- Interactive map of São Roque de Minas
- Country: Brazil
- State: Minas Gerais
- Region: Southeast
- Time zone: UTC−3 (BRT)

Location of São Roque de Minas on a map of the state of Minas Gerais

São Roque de Minas is a Brazilian municipality located in the west of the state of Minas Gerais. Its population as of 2020 was 7,076 people living in a total area of 2,100 km^{2}. The city belongs to the meso-region of Oeste de Minas and to the micro-region of Piumhi. It became a municipality in 1938.

== Geography ==
The city center of São Roque de Minas is located at an elevation of 818 meters on a plateau about 10 kilometers east of the Serra da Canastra National Park entrance. Most of the municipality is occupied by the national park, which contains the source of the São Francisco River. The park contains 71,525 hectares with a perimeter of 173.4 km.

Neighboring municipalities are: Medeiros (N), Bambuí (E), Piumhi (SE), Vargem Bonita and Delfinópolis (S) Conquista and Tapira (W).

The distance to Belo Horizonte is 334 km. The distance to regional center Piumhi is 58 km. In 2000 the connecting roads were not paved.

== Economic activities ==
Services and agriculture are the most important economic activities. A regional cheese called "queijo da canastra" is produced here. The GDP in 2005 was approximately R$56 million, with 2 million reais from taxes, 20 million reais from services, 2 million reais from industry, and 31 million reais from agriculture. There were 778 rural producers on 139,000 hectares of land. 160 farms had tractors (2006). Approximately 2,200 persons were dependent on agriculture. The main crops are coffee, rice, beans, and corn. There were 55,000 head of cattle (2006).

There were no banks (2007) and 1,029 automobiles (2007), giving a ratio of 6 inhabitants per automobile.

== Health and education ==
In the health sector there were 4 public health clinics and 1 hospital with 14 beds (2005). Patients with more serious health conditions are transported to Passos, Piumhi or Franca. Educational needs of 1,250 students were met by 7 primary schools, 2 middle schools, and 5 pre-primary schools.

- Municipal Human Development Index: 0.766 (2000)
- State ranking: 186 out of 853 municipalities as of 2000
- National ranking: 1426 out of 5,138 municipalities as of 2000
- Literacy rate: 88%
- Life expectancy: 74 (average of males and females)
- Infant mortality rate: 27.2 in 1,000 live births.

In 2000 the per capita monthly income of R$256.00 was below the state and national average of R$276.00 and R$297.00 respectively. Poços de Caldas had the highest per capita monthly income in 2000 with R$435.00. The lowest was Setubinha with R$73.00.

The highest ranking municipality in Minas Gerais in 2000 was Poços de Caldas with 0.841, while the lowest was Setubinha with 0.568. Nationally the highest was São Caetano do Sul in São Paulo with 0.919, while the lowest was Setubinha. In more recent statistics (considering 5,507 municipalities) Manari in the state of Pernambuco has the lowest rating in the country—0,467—putting it in last place.

== See also ==
- List of municipalities in Minas Gerais
