= Doresópolis =

Town and municipality in the state of Minas Gerais, Brazil

Coordinates: 20°17′13″S 46°54′10″W

- Municipality
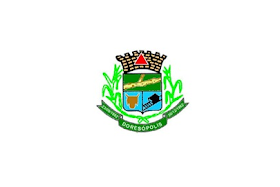
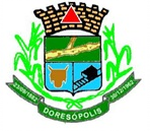
- Flag Coat of arms
- Interactive map of Doresópolis
- Country: Brazil
- State: Minas Gerais
- Region: Southeast
- Time zone: UTC−3 (BRT)

Location of Doresópolis on a map of the state of Minas Gerais

Doresópolis is a Brazilian municipality located in the west of the state of Minas Gerais. Its population as of 2020 was 1,533 people living in a total area of 153 km^{2}. The city belongs to the meso-region of Oeste de Minas and to the micro-region of Piumhi. It became a municipality in 1962.

== Geography ==
The city center of Doresópolis is located at an elevation of 679 meters. Neighboring municipalities are: Bambuí (N and W), Iguatama (N and NE), Pains (E), and Piumhi (S).

The distance to Belo Horizonte is 334 km. The distance to regional center Piumhi is 35 km. In 2000 the connecting roads were not paved.

== Economic activities ==
Services and agriculture are the most important economic activities. The GDP in 2005 was approximately R$11 million, 5 million reais from services, 1 million reais from industry, and 4 million reais from agriculture. There were 205 rural producers on 12,000 hectares of land. 34 farms had tractors (2006). Approximately 600 persons were dependent on agriculture. The main crops are coffee, rice, beans, and corn. There were 7,000 head of cattle (2006).

There were no banks (2007) and 161 automobiles (2007), giving a ratio of 8 inhabitants per automobile.

== Health and education ==
In the health sector there were 2 public health clinics (2005). Patients with more serious health conditions are transported to Divinópolis, Piumhi or Formiga. Educational needs of 400 students were met by 1 primary school, 1 middle school, and 1 pre-primary school.

- Municipal Human Development Index: 0.758 (2000)
- State ranking: 231 out of 853 municipalities as of 2000
- National ranking: 1658 out of 5,138 municipalities as of 2000
- Literacy rate: 88%
- Life expectancy: 72 (average of males and females)

In 2000 the per capita monthly income of R$212.00 was below the state and national average of R$276.00 and R$297.00 respectively. Poços de Caldas had the highest per capita monthly income in 2000 with R$435.00. The lowest was Setubinha with R$73.00.

The highest ranking municipality in Minas Gerais in 2000 was Poços de Caldas with 0.841, while the lowest was Setubinha with 0.568. Nationally the highest was São Caetano do Sul in São Paulo with 0.919, while the lowest was Setubinha. In more recent statistics (considering 5,507 municipalities) Manari in the state of Pernambuco has the lowest rating in the country—0,467—putting it in last place.

== See also ==
- List of municipalities in Minas Gerais
