= Iguatama =

Brazilian municipality

Coordinates: 20°10′26″S 45°42′39″W

- Municipality
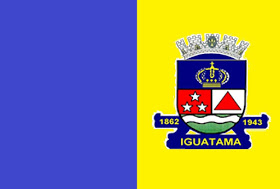
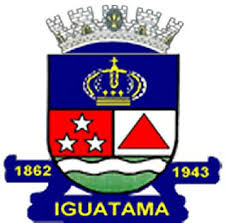
- Flag Coat of arms
- Interactive map of Iguatama
- Country: Brazil
- State: Minas Gerais
- Region: Southeast

Population (2022 Census)
  - Total: 6,826
  - Estimate (2025): 6,782
- Time zone: UTC−3 (BRT)

Location of Iguatama on a map of the state of Minas Gerais

Iguatama is a Brazilian municipality located in the west of the state of Minas Gerais. Its population as of 2025 was 6,782 people living in a total area of 628 km^{2} (242 sq mi). The city belongs to the meso-region of Oeste de Minas and to the micro-region of Piumhi. It became a municipality in 1944.

== Origin of the name ==
Iguatama is a Tupi-Guarani name, Yguaterama or Igua-terrama. This name was suggested by a local pharmacist and means "place where the river opens in bends", or "inlet of my land", or even "place where the river opens up into a lake".

== Geography ==
The city center of Iguatama is located at an elevation of 664 meters. The São Francisco River passes by the town. Neighboring municipalities are: Bambuí (N), Arcos (E), Pains (S), and Doresópolis (W).

The distance to Belo Horizonte is 258 km. The distance to the closest regional center Arcos is 23 km. Highway connections are made by BR-354.

== Economic activities ==
Services, small industries, and agriculture are the most important economic activities. The town is known for its cheese and traditional sweets. The GDP in 2005 was approximately R$117 million, 12 million reais from taxes, 33 million reais from services, 49 million reais from industry, and 21 million reais from agriculture. There were 339 rural producers on 37,000 hectares of land. 77 farms had tractors (2006). Approximately 900 persons were dependent on agriculture. The main crops are beans, soybeans, sorghum, and corn. There were 37,000 head of cattle (2006).

There were no banks (2007) and 161 automobiles (2007), giving a ratio of 8 inhabitants per automobile.

Working population by sector

- Transformation industries (34 units): 398 workers
- Commerce (163 units): 371 workers
- Public administration: 310 workers

== Health and education ==
In the health sector there were 2 public health clinics and 1 private hospital with 26 beds (2005). Patients with more serious health conditions are transported to Divinópolis, Lagoa da Prata or Formiga. Educational needs of 1600 students were met by 8 primary schools, 2 middle schools, and 6 pre-primary schools.

- Municipal Human Development Index: 0.787 (2000)
- State ranking: 87 out of 853 municipalities as of 2000
- National ranking: 894 out of 5,138 municipalities as of 2000
- Literacy rate: 91%
- Life expectancy: 72 (average of males and females)

In 2000 the per capita monthly income of R$260.00 was below the state and national average of R$276.00 and R$297.00 respectively. Poços de Caldas had the highest per capita monthly income in 2000 with R$435.00. The lowest was Setubinha with R$73.00.

The highest ranking municipality in Minas Gerais in 2000 was Poços de Caldas with 0.841, while the lowest was Setubinha with 0.568. Nationally the highest was São Caetano do Sul in São Paulo with 0.919, while the lowest was Setubinha. In more recent statistics (considering 5,507 municipalities) Manari in the state of Pernambuco has the lowest rating in the country—0,467—putting it in last place.

== See also ==
- List of municipalities in Minas Gerais
