= List of hydroelectric power stations in Brazil =

The following is a list of hydroelectric power stations in Brazil with a nameplate capacity of at least 100 MW.

According to the Associação Brasileira de Distribuidores de Energia Elétrica (ABRADEE) there are 201 hydroelectric power stations in Brazil with a nameplate capacity of more than 30 MW; the total capacity of these power stations in 2015 was 84,703 MW. There are an additional 476 hydroelectric power stations with a nameplate capacity between 1 and 30 MW and 496 micro hydroelectric power stations with a nameplate capacity of less than 1 MW.

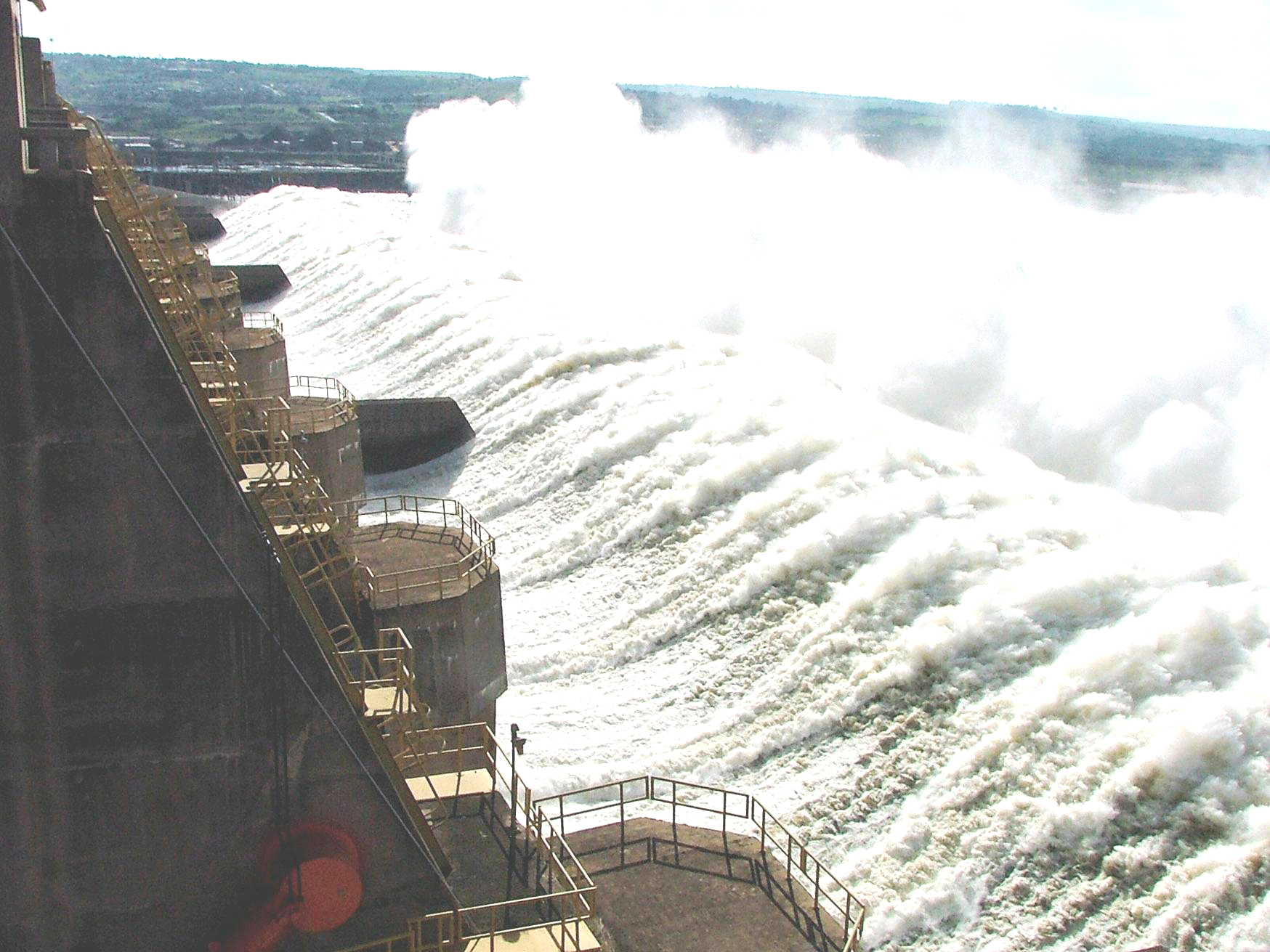
The Tucuruí Dam

Station	Community	Coordinates	Capacity (MW)	Status	PS	Ref
Água Vermelha Dam	Iturama, MG	19°56′59″S 49°53′54″W	1,396	Operational	No	
Balbina Dam	Presidente Figueiredo, AM	01°55′02″S 59°28′25″W	250	Operational	No	
Barra Grande Hydroelectric Power Plant	Celso Ramos, SC	27°46′36″S 51°11′23″W	708	Operational	No	
Belo Monte Dam	Xingu River, PA	03°17′00″S 52°12′00″W	11,233	Operational		
Bento Munhoz Hydroelectric Plant	Foz do Areia, PR	26°00′34″S 51°40′00″W	1,676	Operational	No	
Bernard Mascarenhas Power Plant	Três Marias, MG	18°12′51″S 45°15′46″W	387	Operational	No	
Billings Dam	São Paulo, SP	23°47′13″S 46°35′02″W	889	Operational	No	
Boa Esperança Hydroelectric Power Plant	Guadalupe, PI	06°45′00″S 43°44′00″W	237	Operational		
Campos Novos Dam	Celso Ramos, SC	27°36′15″S 51°19′35″W	880	Operational		
Capivara Dam	Porecatu, PR	22°39′36″S 51°21′28″W	619	Operational		
Chacorão Dam	Amazonas, Pará	6°29′52″S 58°19′25″W	3,336	Planned		
Colider Dam	Colider, MT	11°6′19″S 55°27′58″W	307	Operational		
Dona Francisca Hydroelectric Plant	Rio Grande do Sul	29.4478°S 53.2847°W	250	Operational		
Emborcação Hydroelectric Power Plant	Araguari, MG	18°34′33″S 47°52′37″W	1,192	Operational	No	
Engineer Souza Dias Hydroelectric Power Station	Três Lagoas, SP	26°27′00″S 52°40′00″W	1,424	Operational	No	
Estreito Hydroelectric Power Plant	Estreito, MA	06°35′22″S 47°27′53″W	1,087	Operational	No	
Furnas Dam	MG	20°40′11″S 46°19′05″W	1,240	Operational	No	
Ney Braga Hydroelectric Plant	Segredo, PR	25°47′35″S 52°6′47″W	1,260	Operational	No	
José Richa Hydroelectric Plant	Salto Caxias, PR	25°32′36″S 53°29′48″W	1,240	Operational	No	
Itá Hydroelectric Power Plant	Itá, SC	27°16′38″S 52°23′00″W	1,450	Operational	No	
Itaipu Dam	Foz do Iguaçu, PR	25°24′30″S 54°35′21″W	14,000	Operational	No	
Itumbiara Hydroelectric Power Plant	Itumbiara, GO	18°25′00″S 49°13′00″W	2,082	Operational	No	
Ilha Solteira Dam	Ilha Solteira, SP	20°22′58″S 51°21′44″W	3,444	Operational	No	
Jaguara Dam	Rifaina, SP	20°01′25″S 47°26′01″W	424	Operational	No	
Jatobá Hydroelectric Power Plant	Itaituba, PA	5°11′21″S 56°54′51″W	2,338	Planned		
Jirau Power Station	Porto Velho, RO	9°15′0″S 64°24′0″W	3,750	Operational		
Juscelino Kubitschek Power Plant (Irapé Dam)	Berilo/Grão Mogol, MG	16°44′15″S 42°34′30″W	360	Operational		
Luiz Carlos Barreto de Carvalho Hydroelectric Power Plant	Pedregulho, SP	20°9′10″S 47°16′51″W	1,050	Operational	No	
Luiz Gonzaga Power Station	Petrolândia, PE	9°8′38″S 38°18′48″W	1,479	Operational	No	
Machadinho Hydroelectric Power Plant	Machadinho, RS	27°31′31″S 51°47′07″W	1,140	Operational	No	
Marimbondo Hydroelectric Power Plant	Fronteira, MG	20°46′28″S 49°21′20″W	1,440	Operational	No	
Miranda Dam	Uberlandia, MG	18°54′46″S 48°02′23″W	408	Operational	No	
Nova Avanhandava Dam	Buritama, SP	21°07′06″S 50°12′04″W	347.4	Operational	No	
Paulo Afonso Hydroelectric Complex	Paulo Afonso, BA	9°23′49″S 38°12′08″W	4,279 (5 total)	Operational	No	
Mascarenhas de Moraes Hydroelectric Plant	Delfinópolis, MG	20°17′05″S 47°03′49″W	476	Operational		
Porto Primavera Dam	Rosana, SP	15°34′45″S 56°05′49″W	1,540	Operational	No	
Salto Santiago Hydroelectric Power Plant	Osório, PR	25°37′04″S 52°36′48″W	1,420	Operational	No	
Salto Osório Hydroelectric Power Plant	Osório, PR	25°32′06″S 53°00′33″W	1,078	Operational	No	
Santo Antonio Dam	Porto Velho, RO	8°48′6″S 63°57′3″W	3,580	Operational		
São Simão Hydroelectric Power Plant	São Simão, GO	18°59′03″S 50°31′08″W	1,710	Operational	No	
Serra da Mesa Hydroelectric Power Station	Minaçu, GO	24°58′23″S 53°28′19″W	1,275	Operational	No	
Simplício Hydroelectric Complex (Anta Dam)	RJ	22°2′3″S 43°0′3″W	333.7	Operational		
Sobradinho Dam	Sobradinho, BA	9°25′57″S 40°49′41″W	1,050	Operational	No	
Teles Pires Dam	Paranaíta, MT	9°20′26″S 56°46′37″W	1,820	Operational	No	
Três Irmãos Dam	Pereira Barreto, SP	20°39′56″S 51°18′05″W	807.5	Operational		
Tucuruí Dam	Tucuruí, PA	03°49′54″S 49°38′48″W	8,370	Operational	No	
Volta Grande Dam	Água Comprida, MG	20°01′56″S 48°13′17″W	380	Operational	No	
Xingó Hydroelectrical Power Plant	Piranhas, AL	9°37′14″S 37°47′34″W	3,162	Operational		

== See also ==
- List of power stations in Brazil
- List of dams and reservoirs in Brazil
