= List of dams and reservoirs in Brazil =

Many of the dams and reservoirs in Brazil listed below are used primarily used to produce hydroelectric power. Other uses include flood control, irrigation and fisheries.

== List ==
Name	State	Operational	Reservoir (km^{2})	Installed capacity (MW)	Notes
Água Vermelha Dam	Minas Gerais; São Paulo	1978	647	1,396	
Anta Dam (Simplício)	Rio de Janeiro; Minas Gerais	2013	15	333	
Balbina Dam	Amazonas	1989	2,360	250	
Barra Grande Dam	Santa Catarina; Rio Grande do Sul	2005	94	708	
Belo Monte Dam	Pará	2019	440	11,233	
Bento Munhoz da Rocha Netto Dam	Paraná	1980	167	1,676	
Billings Dam	São Paulo	1935	127	-	Reservoir
Camará Dam	Paraíba	2002			
Campos Novos Dam	Santa Catarina	2006		880	
Capivara Dam	São Paulo; Paraná	1978	515	619	
Castanhão Dam	Ceará	2003	360	-	Reservoir
Chacorão Dam	Amazonas; Pará		616	3,336	Planned
Cocorobó Dam	Bahia	1967	24	-	Reservoir
Colíder Dam	Mato Grosso	2019	183	307	
Dona Francisca Dam	Rio Grande do Sul	2001	21	250	
Emborcação Dam	Minas Gerais	1983	703	1,192	
Eng Sérgio Motta Dam	São Paulo	1999	2,250	1,540	
Eng Souza Dias Dam	Mato Grosso do Sul	1968	330	1,551	
Funil Dam	Rio de Janeiro; São Paulo	2004	40.5	180	
Furnas Dam	Minas Gerais	1963	1,473	1,216	
Garabí Dam	Rio Grande do Sul		642	1,152	Planned
Guarapiranga	São Paulo	1906	27	-	Reservoir
Ilha Solteira Dam	São Paulo	1973	1,195	3,444	
Irapé Dam	Minas Gerais	2006	137	360	
Itá Dam	Santa Catarina; Rio Grande do Sul	2000	141	1,450	
Itaipu Dam	Paraná	1984	1,350	14,000	
Itumbiara Dam	Goiás	1980	778	2,082	
Itupararanga Dam	São Paulo	1914	936	55	
Jaguara Dam	Minas Gerais; São Paulo	1971		424	
Jatobá Dam	Pará		646	2,338	Planned
Jirau Dam	Rondônia	2013	258	3,750	
José Richa Dam	Paraná	1999	180	1,240	
Luiz Barreto Dam	São Paulo	1969	47	1,050	
Luiz Gonzaga Dam	Pernambuco	1988	830	1,479	
Machadinho Dam	Santa Catarina; Rio Grande do Sul	2002	79	1,140	
Manso Dam	Mato Grosso	1999	427	212	
Marimbondo Dam	Minas Gerais	1975	438	1,440	
Marmelos Zero Power Plant	Minas Gerais	1889	-	0.25	Decommissioned in 1896
Mauá Dam	Paraná	2012	84	361	
Ney Braga de Barros Dam	Paraná	1992		1,260	
Nova Avanhandava Dam	São Paulo	1982	210	347	
Oiticica Dam	Rio Grande do Norte	2025	?	-	Reservoir
Orós Dam	Ceará	1961		-	Reservoir
Panambí Dam	Rio Grande do Sul		327	1,048	Planned
Paulo Afonso Hydroelectric Complex	Bahia	1979	1,600	4,279	
Peixotos Dam	Minas Gerais	1968	250	476	
Salto Osório Dam	Paraná	1975	51	1,078	
Salto Santiago Dam	Paraná	1980	208	2,137	
Samuel Hydroelectric Dam	Rondônia	1989	560	216	
Santo Antônio Dam	Rondônia	2012	271	3,568	
São Simão Dam	Goiás; Minas Gerais	1978	703	1,710	
Serra da Mesa Dam	Goiás	1998	1,784	1,275	
Sobradinho Dam	Bahia	1979	4,220	1,050	
Teles Pires Dam	Mato Grosso; Pará	2016	151	1,820	
Três Irmãos Dam	São Paulo	1991	785	807	
Três Marias Dam	Minas Gerais	1961	1,040	387	
Tucuruí Dam	Pará	1984	2,850	8,370	
Volta Grande Dam	Minas Gerais; São Paulo	1974		380	
Xingó Dam	Alagoas; Sergipe	1994	60	3,162	

== See also ==
- List of power stations in Brazil
- List of hydroelectric power stations in Brazil
