= Río de la Plata Basin =

Drainage basin in eastern South America

Río de la Plata Basin Platine Region
- Basin
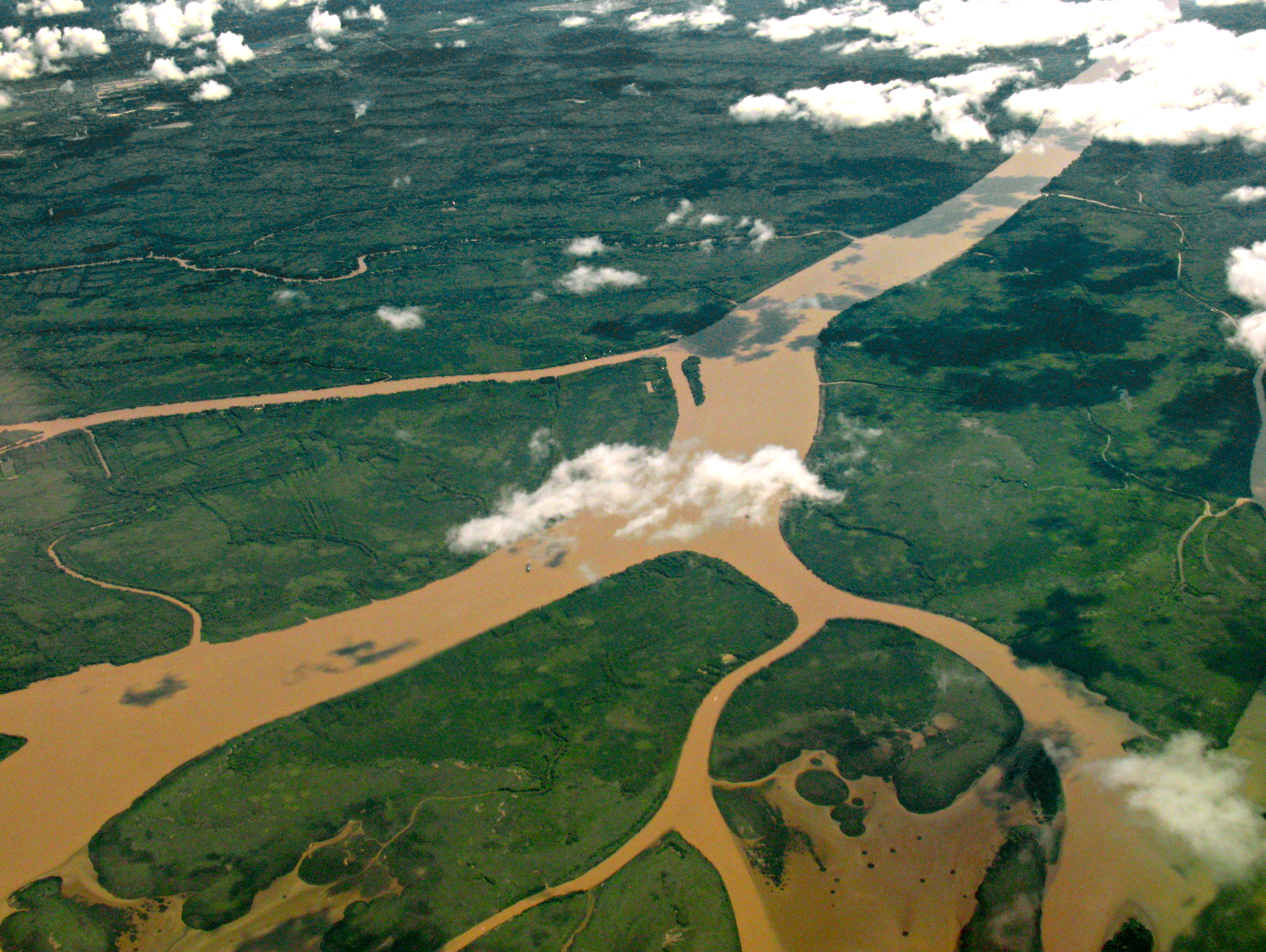
- Aerial view of the Paraná Delta within the Río de la Plata basin, north of Buenos Aires

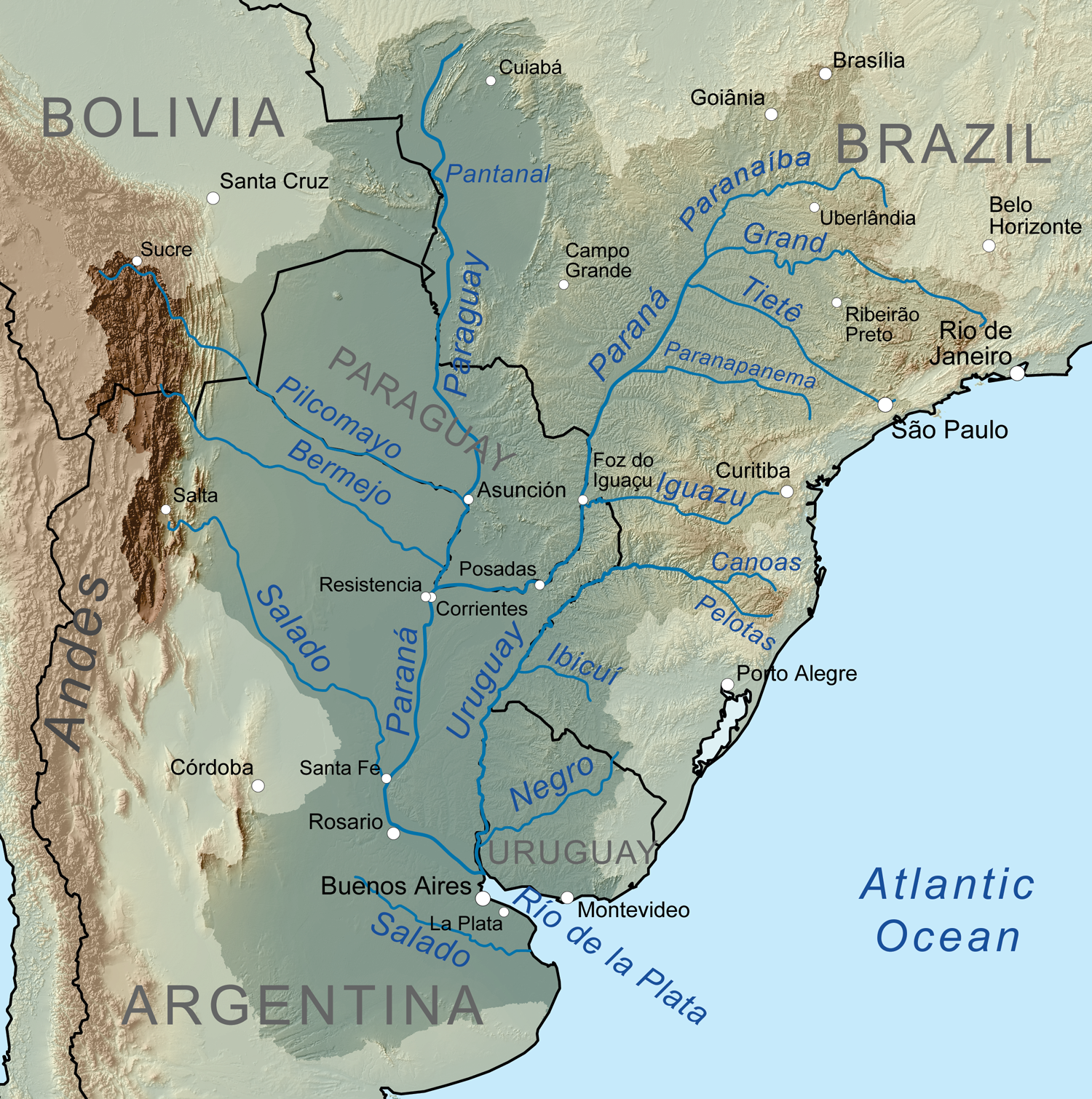
- Map of the Río de la Plata basin in South America, with major cities and rivers marked
- Coordinates: 32°15′S 59°30′W
- Location: South America

Area
  - Total: 3,170,000 square kilometres (1,220,000 sq mi)
- Major rivers: Río de la Plata, Paraná River, Uruguay River, Paraguay River

The Río de la Plata basin (Spanish: Cuenca del Plata, Portuguese: Bacia do Prata), more often called the River Plate basin in scholarly writings, sometimes called the Platine basin or Platine region, is the 3,170,000-square-kilometre (1,220,000 sq mi) hydrographical area in South America that drains to the Río de la Plata. It includes areas of southeastern Bolivia, southern and central Brazil, the entire country of Paraguay, most of Uruguay, and northern Argentina. Making up about one fourth of the continent's surface, it is the second largest drainage basin in South America (after the Amazon basin) and one of the largest in the world. It is one of two river systems in the world defined as international waters.

The main rivers of the La Plata basin are the Paraná River, the Paraguay River (the Paraná's main tributary), and the Uruguay River.

== Geography ==
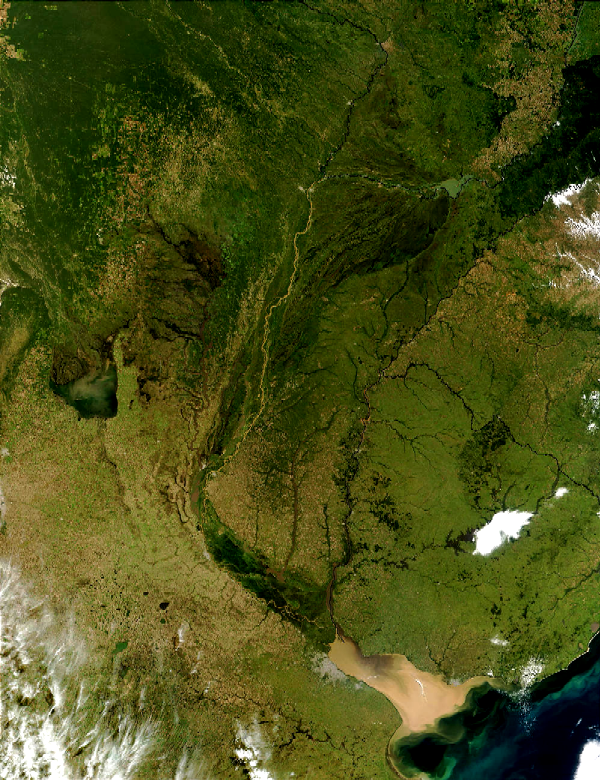
Part of the Río de la Plata basin viewed from space.

The La Plata basin is bounded by the Brazilian Highlands to the north, the Andes Mountains to the west, and Patagonia to the south. The watershed extends mostly northward from the source of the Río de la Plata for roughly 2,400 kilometres (1,500 mi), as far as Brasília and Cuiabá in Brazil and Sucre in Bolivia, spanning latitudes between 14 and 37 degrees south and longitudes between 43 and 67 degrees west. The Paraná River, La Plata's largest tributary, is South America's second longest river and one of the longest in the world.

Politically, the basin includes part or all of the Brazilian states of Mato Grosso, Goiás, Minas Gerais, São Paulo, Mato Grosso do Sul, Paraná, Santa Catarina, and Rio Grande do Sul; the Bolivian departments of Santa Cruz, Chuquisaca and Tarija; the entire country of Paraguay; the western and central departments of Uruguay; and the Argentine provinces of Jujuy, Salta, Formosa, Chaco, Misiones, Tucumán, Santiago del Estero, Santa Fe, Corrientes, Córdoba, Entre Ríos, Buenos Aires, and La Pampa.

== Hydrology ==
The precipitation falling within this area is collected by numerous rivers to finally reach the Río de la Plata, almost all of it through the Paraná River, the Paraguay River, and the Uruguay River, La Plata's most important tributaries. The river discharges water into the Atlantic Ocean at an average rate of 22,000 cubic metres per second (780,000 cu ft/s), the majority of which comes from the Paraná.

The basin serves as the recharge zone for the Guarani Aquifer, one of the world's largest aquifer systems. The rivers of the La Plata Basin carry an estimated 57,000,000 cubic metres (2.0×10^{9} cu ft) of silt into the Río de la Plata each year, where the muddy waters are stirred up by winds and tides; the shipping route from the Atlantic to Buenos Aires is kept open by continual dredging.

=== Tributaries ===
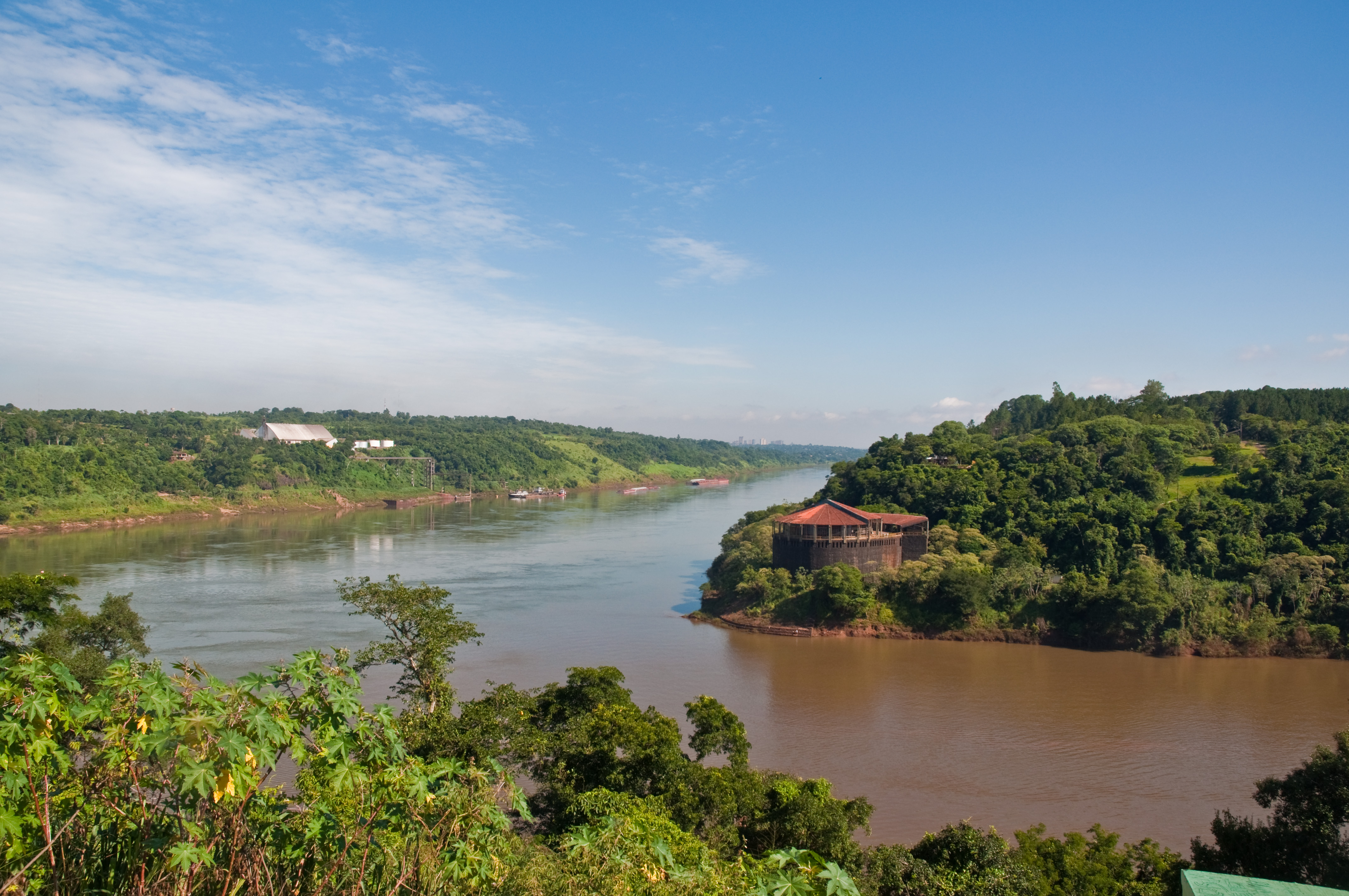
Confluence of the Iguazú and Paraná rivers in Puerto Iguazú, within the Atlantic Forest.

The Paraná River's main tributaries include the Paranaíba River, Grande River, Tietê River, Paranapanema River, Iguazu River, Paraguay River, and the Salado River, after which it ends in the large Paraná Delta. The Paraguay River flows through the Pantanal wetland, after which its main tributaries include the Pilcomayo River and the Bermejo River, before it ends in the Paraná. The Uruguay's main tributaries include the Pelotas River, Canoas River, Ibicuí River, and the Río Negro. Another significant tributary to the Río de la Plata is the Salado del Sur River.

== History ==
The Río de la Plata Basin has been the site of much conflict in the modern history of South America, much of it because the basin contained the (contested) frontiers between the Portuguese and Spanish Empires in South America and their successor states. A series of wars has been fought over territorial control in the region, particularly in the nineteenth century.

=== Early exploration ===
Explorer Sebastian Cabot made a detailed study of the Río de la Plata and its tributaries and gave the river its modern name. He explored the Paraná and Uruguay rivers between 1526 and 1529, ascending the Paraná as far as the present-day city of Asunción, and also explored up the Paraguay River. Cabot acquired silver trinkets trading with the Guaraní near today's Asunción, and these objects gave rise to the name Río de la Plata, "river of silver".

=== Colonial period ===
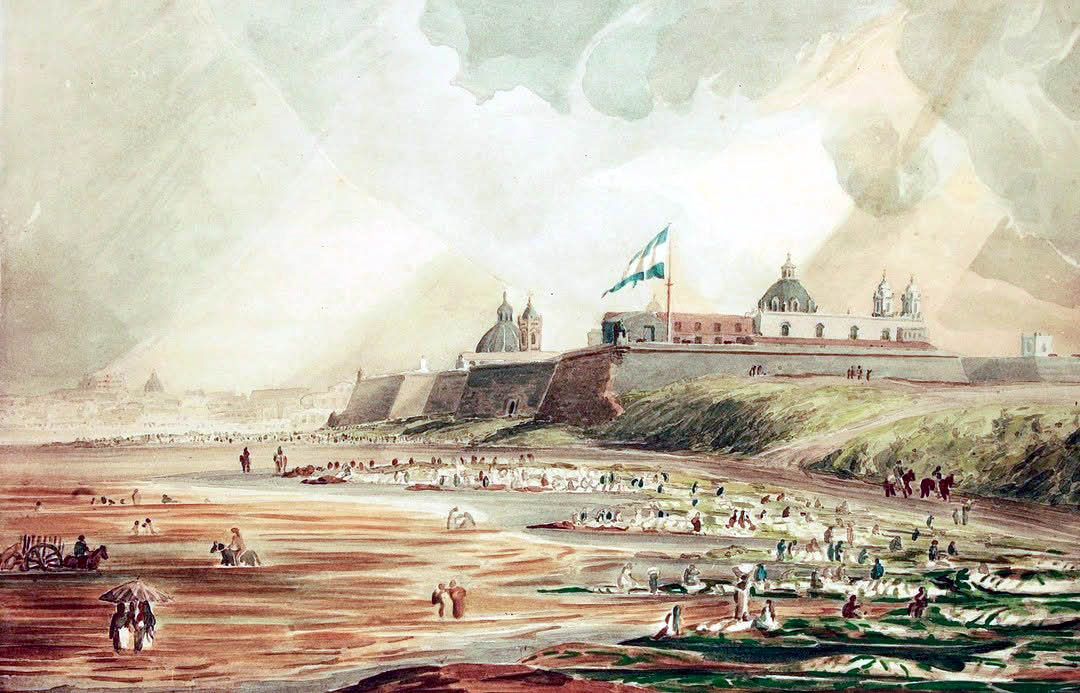
The Fort of Buenos Aires was the defense of the city until 1882.

The first European colony in the Platine region was the city of Buenos Aires, founded by Pedro de Mendoza on 2 February 1536. This settlement, however, was quickly abandoned; the failure to establish a settlement on the La Plata estuary led to explorations upriver and the founding of Asunción in 1537. Buenos Aires was subsequently refounded by Juan de Garay on 11 June 1580.

During the colonial era because of the lack of precious metals, the Platine basin was largely neglected by the Spanish Empire until the XVIII century when Portugal, after the founding of Colonia del Sacramento and the colonization of Rio Grande do Sul, and Britain threatened to expand into the estuary. The Spanish colonies in the region were separated from the Viceroyalty of Perú and formed into a new Viceroyalty of the Río de la Plata in 1776 with the capital city in Buenos Aires. During the Napoleonic Wars, Spain became an ally of the French, and Britain invaded the region in 1806–1807 unsuccessfully.

=== Revolutionary period ===
Conflict in the region intensified after the independence of the former Spanish and Portuguese colonies in the first quarter of the 19th century. Territorial interests and navigation rights in the Platine region were at issue in many armed conflicts throughout the century, including the Argentine Civil Wars, the Cisplatine and Platine wars, and the Paraguayan War.

== Economic features ==
=== Dams ===
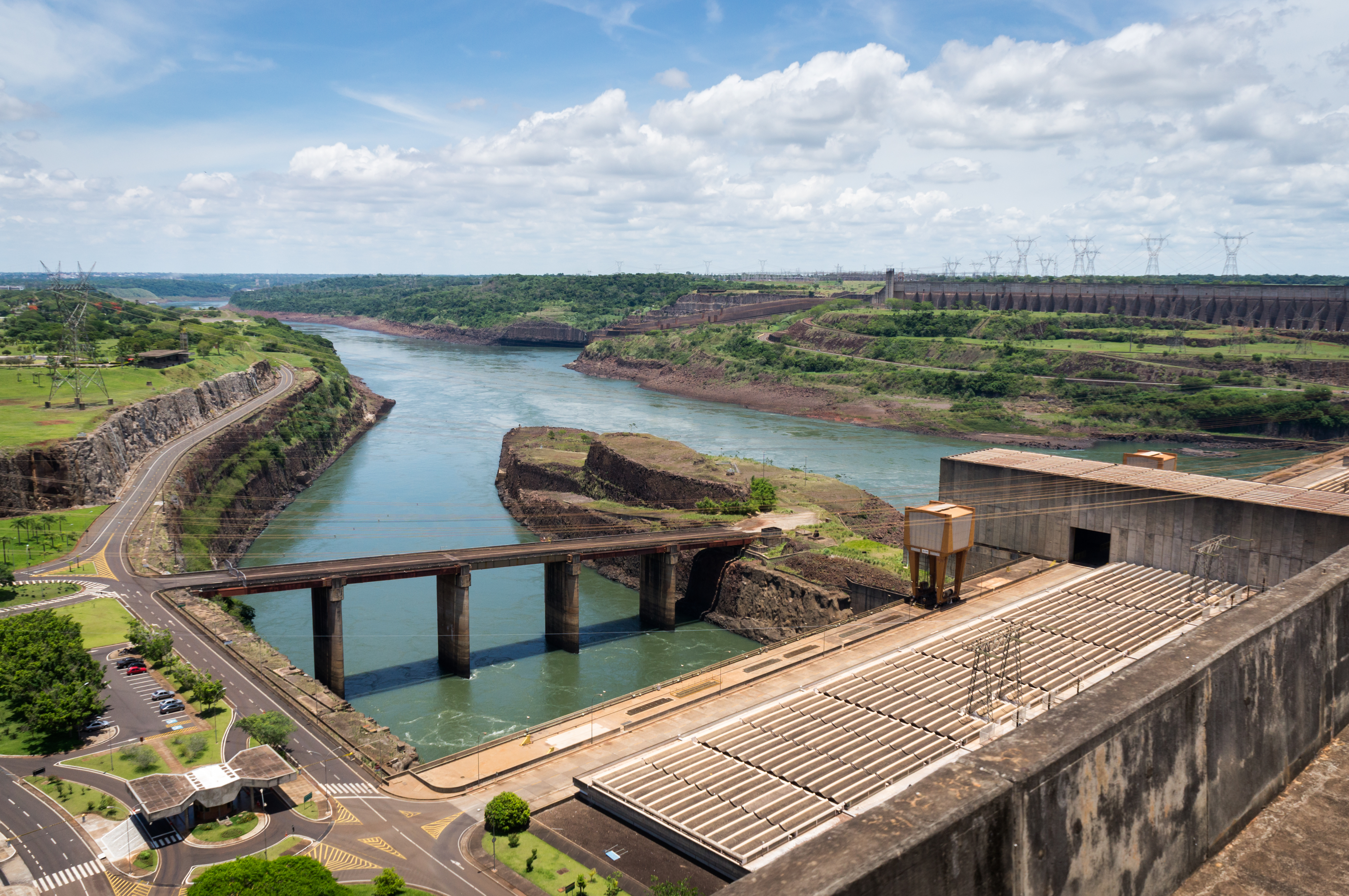
View of the Itaipu Dam between Paraguay and Brazil.

There are several hydroelectric dams operating in the basin, among them the third largest operating facility in the world, Itaipu, shared between Paraguay and Brazil on the Paraná River; the 21st, Ilha Solteira Dam in Brazil, on the Paraná; the 25th, the Yacyretá Dam shared between Paraguay and Argentina, also on the Paraná; and the 53rd, the Itumbiara Dam in Brazil on the Paranaíba River.

Also on the Paranaíba in Brazil are the Emborcação and São Simão dams. On the Paraná in Brazil also are the Engineer Souza Dias and the Engineer Sérgio Motta dams.

On the Grande River in Brazil are the Água Vermelha, Furnas, Peixoto, Marimbondo, Luiz Barreto, Jaguara, and Volta Grande dams.

On the Iguazu river in Brazil are the Bento Munhoz, Ney Braga, José Richa, Salto Santiago, and Salto Osório hydroelectric power plants. On the Pelotas river in Brazil, it is the Machadinho Hydroelectric Power Plant.

The Salto Grande Dam is on the Uruguay River and it is shared between Uruguay and Argentina. Also on the Uruguay River but in Brazilian territory is the Itá Hydroelectric Power Plant.

On the Negro River, in Uruguay, there are the Rincon del Bonete or Gabriel Terra Reservoir, and the Baygorria and Constitucion dams.

== Regional culture ==
The dialect of Spanish spoken in the lower Río de la Plata basin is Rioplatense Spanish, named for the river. The Platine region is the birthplace of the tango dance and music.
