= Furnas (disambiguation) =

Furnas is a parish in the Azores.

Furnas may also refer to:

- Furnas (surname)
- Furnas County, Nebraska
- Eletrobras Furnas, a Brazilian regional electrical utility
- Furnas Dam, a hydroelectric dam in Minas Gerais, Brazil
