= Tim (footballer) =

Brazilian footballer and coach

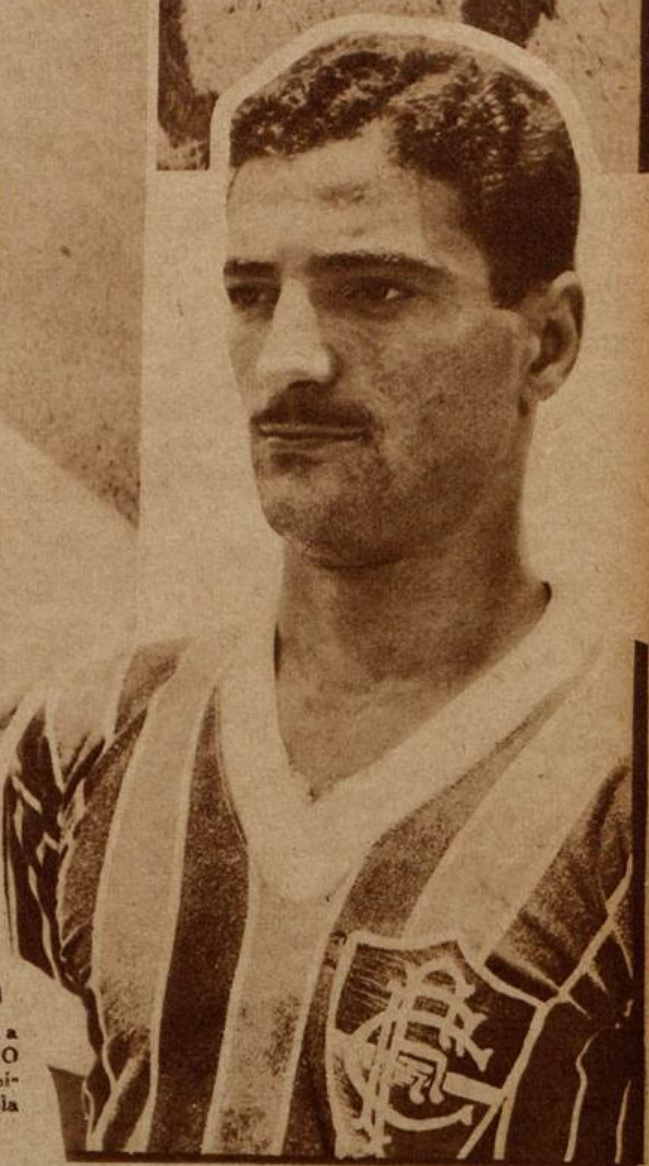

Personal information
- Full name: Elba de Pádua Lima
- Date of birth: 20 February 1915
- Place of birth: Rifaina, Brazil
- Date of death: 7 July 1984 (aged 69)
- Place of death: Rio de Janeiro, Brazil
- Position: Striker

Senior career*
Years	Team	Apps	(Gls)
1931–1934	Carrington		
1935–1936	Portuguesa Santista		
1936–1943	Fluminense	359	(133)
1943–1944	Nacional-SP		
1944–1947	São Paulo		
1947–1949	Olaria		
1948–1950	Botafogo-SP		
1950–1951	Atlético Junior		

International career
1936–1944	Brazil	16	(1)

Managerial career
- 1947–1949: Olaria (player manager)
- 1948–1950: Botafogo-SP (player manager)
- 1950–1951: Atlético Junior (player manager)
- 1953: Bangu
- 1953–1956: Bangu
- 1959–1960: Bangu
- 1963–1964: Bangu
- 1964–1967: Fluminense
- 1967–1968: San Lorenzo
- 1969: Flamengo
- 1970: Vasco da Gama
- 1971: Coritiba
- 1972: Botafogo
- 1973: Coritiba
- 1974–1975: Santos
- 1975: Guarani
- 1980–1982: Vitória
- 1980–1982: Coritiba
- 1980: Bangu
- 1981–1982: Peru
Medal record
Representing Brazil
FIFA World Cup
Third place	1938 France
- * Club domestic league appearances and goals

Elba de Pádua Lima (20 February 1915 – 7 July 1984), best known by the nickname Tim, was a Brazilian footballer and coach. He's one of the greatest Fluminense's players in history.

Tim was born in Rifaina, São Paulo. During his career, which spanned from 1931 to 1951, he played for Brazilian clubs Botafogo-SP, Portuguesa Santista, Fluminense, and Olaria; he won five Rio de Janeiro State Tournaments (1936, 1937, 1938, 1940, 1941) with Fluminense. He retired in Colombia with Atlético Junior of Barranquilla. He was also a member of the Brazil national team, at the 1938 FIFA World Cup, playing one match against Czechoslovakia, and at the South American Championship 1942, where he scored one goal.

44 years after participating in the World Cup as a player, Tim was the manager of the Peru national football team at the 1982 World Cup, in what is the longest interval ever between an individual's World Cup participations, and the longest World Cup career overall. Two years after the 1982 World Cup, he died in Rio de Janeiro at the age of 69. He coached Bangu. In 1968, he was Primera División Argentina champion with San Lorenzo de Almagro.

== Honours ==
=== Player ===
Fluminense

- Campeonato Carioca (5): 1936, 1937, 1938, 1940, 1941

=== Manager ===
Fluminense

- Campeonato Carioca (1): 1964
- Taça Guanabara (1): 1966

Bangu

- International Soccer League (1): 1960

San Lorenzo

- Argentine Primera División: 1968 Metropolitano

Vasco da Gama

- Campeonato Carioca (1): 1970

Coritiba

- Campeonato Paranaense (2): 1971, 1973
- Torneio do Povo (1): 1973
