= Barra Grande Hydroelectric Power Plant =

Barra Grande Dam
- Location within Brazil
- Official name: Barra Grande Hydroelectric Power Plant
- Location: Celso Ramos, Santa Catarina/Rio Grande do Sul, Brazil
- Coordinates: 27°46′36″S 51°11′23″W
- Construction began: 2001
- Opening date: 2005
- Construction cost: $1.5 billion USD
- Owner: Energética Barra Grande SA (BAESA)

Dam and spillways
- Type of dam: Embankment, concrete face rock-fill
- Impounds: Pelotas River
- Height: 185 m (607 ft)
- Length: 665 m (2,182 ft)
- Width (crest): 14 m (46 ft)
- Width (base): 500 m (1,600 ft)
- Spillway type: Service, controlled

Reservoir
- Creates: Barra Grande Reservoir
- Surface area: 94 km^{2} (36 sq mi)

Power Station
- Commission date: 2005–2006
- Turbines: 3 x 236 MW (316,000 hp) Francis turbines
- Installed capacity: 708 MW (949,000 hp)
- Website; BAESA

The Barra Grande Hydroelectric Power Plant is a dam and hydroelectric power plant on the Pelotas River near Celso Ramos on the border of Santa Catarina and Rio Grande do Sul, Brazil. The power station has a 708 MW capacity and is supplied with water by a concrete face rock-fill embankment dam, the second tallest dam in Brazil. It is owned and operated by Energética Barra Grande SA (BAESA) and produces a 30% equivalent of the demand in Santa Catarina.

== Background ==
Construction on the dam began in May 2001 by the consortium BAESA whose stakeholders include Alcoa 42.2%, Companhia Paulista de Força e Luz (CPFL) 25%, Companhia Brasileira de Alumínio (CBA) 15%, Camargo Corrêa Cimentos 9%, and DME Energética 8.8%. On 1 November 2005, the first generator went into operation, the second in February 2006 and the third in May of the same year. In September 2005 after construction was complete and the reservoir began to fill, the concrete face on the upstream side of the dam cracked, causing a leak of 1280 liters/s. In June 2007, soil was dumped in the area which reduced the leak to 800 L/s. The dam still remains safe.

== Barra Grande Dam ==
The Barra Grande Dam is a 665 metres (2,182 ft) long and 185 m (607 ft) high concrete face rock-fill embankment dam. At its base, it is 500 metres (1,600 ft) wide and 14 metres (46 ft) at its crest. The dam impounds a reservoir with a surface area of 94 square kilometres (36 sq mi) which supplies water to three 236 MW Francis turbines in the power station.

== Controversy ==
Construction of the dam required clearing 40 square kilometres (15 sq mi) of araucaria, a Brazilian pine tree, of which only 1% to 7% of their original forest survives. Other species threatened by the reservoir were the endangered bromeliad Dyckia distachya and Paraná. The environmental controversy require BAESA to extend and acquire new licenses along with spending extra money on programs.

== See also ==
- Machadinho Hydroelectric Power Plant
- Itá Hydroelectric Power Plant
- List of power stations in Brazil
