= Luiz Barreto Dam =

- Location within Brazil
- Official name: Usina de Luiz Carlos Barreto de Carvalho
- Location: Pedregulho, São Paulo, Brazil
- Coordinates: 20°9′11″S 47°16′46″W
- Construction began: 1963
- Opening date: 1969
- Operator: Eletrobrás Furnas

Dam and spillways
- Type of dam: Embankment
- Impounds: Grande River
- Height: 92 m (302 ft)
- Length: 535 m (1,755 ft)
- Width (crest): 15.8 m (52 ft)
- Dam volume: 4,290,000 m^{3} (151,000,000 cu ft)
- Spillway type: Service, gate-controlled
- Spillway capacity: 13,000 m^{3}/s (460,000 cu ft/s)

Reservoir
- Creates: Luiz Carlos Barreto de Carvalho Reservoir
- Total capacity: 1,418,000,000 m^{3} (1,150,000 acre⋅ft)
- Surface area: 46.7 km^{2} (18.0 sq mi)

Power Station
- Commission date: 1969
- Type: Conventional
- Turbines: 6 x Francis-type
- Installed capacity: 1,050 MW (1,410,000 hp)

The Luiz Carlos Barreto de Carvalho Dam is an embankment dam on the Grande River near Fronteira in São Paulo, Brazil. The dam serves an associated hydroelectric power plant with a 1,050 megawatts (1,410,000 hp) installed capacity.

== Background ==
Owned and maintained by Eletrobrás Furnas, they completed studies for the dam in 1962. Construction began in 1963 and was complete in March 1969 when the first generator went online. The dam and power plant were also inaugurated that year. Because of the Furnas Dam upstream, the water level in the reservoir is operated at similar levels year round. Furnas is currently planning to renovate and modernize the dam and power plant.

== Specifications ==
The Luiz Barreto Dam is a 535 metres (1,755 ft) long and 92 metres (302 ft) high earth-fill embankment dam. The total structural volume of materials for the dam is 4,290,000 cubic metres (151,000,000 cu ft). The dam's spillway contains six floodgates that are 11.5 metres (38 ft) wide and 16.5 metres (54 ft) high each. In total, the spillway has a 13,000 cubic metres per second (460,000 cu ft/s) discharge capacity.

== Reservoir ==
The reservoir created by the dam has a surface area of 46.7 square kilometres (18.0 sq mi) and capacity of 1,418,000,000 cubic metres (1,150,000 acre⋅ft) with on 10% of the capacity (178,000,000 cubic metres (144,000 acre⋅ft)) serving as live (active or "useful") storage. The normal reservoir level is 622.5 metres (2,042 ft) above sea level and the maximum is 626.64 metres (2,055.9 ft).

== Luiz Barreto Hydroelectric Power Plant ==
Luiz Barreto Hydroelectric Power Plant power house is 24.2 metres (79 ft) wide and 177 metres (581 ft) long and contains six 175 megawatts (235,000 hp) generators that are powered by Francis turbines.

== See also ==
- List of power stations in Brazil
