= Simplício Hydroelectric Complex =

- Interactive map of Simplício Hydroelectric Complex
- Official name: Hidrelétrico UHE Simplício
- Country: Brazil
- Location: Rio de Janeiro, Minas Gerais
- Coordinates: 22°2′3″S 43°0′3″W
- Status: Operational
- Construction began: January 2007
- Opening date: June 2013
- Construction cost: $2 billion USD
- Owner: Eletrobrás Furnas

Upper reservoir
- Creates: Complex contains

Lower reservoir
- Creates: five reservoirs

Power Station
- Hydraulic head: 80 m (260 ft)
- Turbines: Main powerhouse: 3 x 101.3 MW (135,800 hp) Francis-type; Anta Dam: 2 x 14.4 MW (19,300 hp) Kaplan-type
- Installed capacity: 333.7 MW (447,500 hp)

The Simplício Hydroelectric Complex is located on the Paraíba do Sul river on the border of Rio de Janeiro and Minas Gerais states in Brazil. Supported by the Anta Dam, it transfers water through a 26 kilometres (16 mi) circuit to a downstream power plant. After years of delay and a cost of US$2 billion, the power complex became operational in June 2013.

== Background ==
Construction on the complex began in January 2007 after the Brazilian Institute of Environment and Renewable Natural Resources (IBAMA) issued an installation permit. One goal of the project is to reduce environmental impacts created by large reservoirs. The complex's five reservoirs will have a surface area of 15.36 square kilometres (5.93 sq mi). On August 5, 2009, the river was diverted through the Anta Dam's spillway. The rate progress is such that the completion of construction is on schedule for commissioning in 2013. The Anta Dam began to impound its reservoir in late February 2013. All three generators went into operation by early June 2013. The project was completed almost three years behind schedule. Delays were attributed to increased costs, lengthy permit approvals and a court decision which delayed the Anta Reservoir from being filled.

== Operation ==
Water from the Paraíba do Sul is impounded at the 29.5-metre (97 ft) high and 260-metre (850 ft) long roller-compacted concrete Anta Dam before being diverted into a series of eight water channels, four water tunnels and five reservoirs totaling 26 kilometres (16 mi) in length. At the end of the circuit, the water is fed to a power station containing 3 x 101.3 megawatts (135,800 hp) Francis turbines. The Anta Dam itself supports a 28.8 megawatts (38,600 hp) power station with 2 x 14.4 megawatts (19,300 hp)Kaplan turbine-powered generators.

The water diverted by the dam first enters channel C1 which is 1.9 kilometres (1.2 mi) long, 28 metres (92 ft) wide and 8 metres (26 ft) deep. After C1, the water moves into the 1,458-metre (4,783 ft) long tunnel T1 before entering the 1-kilometre (0.62 mi) long channel C2. After C2 and the use of a dike, the water forms the Tocaia reservoir before entering channel C3 which is 565 metres (1,854 ft) long. From C3, water is led into tunnel T2 and then to the 85-metre (279 ft) long channel C4 before reaching tunnel T2A. Water from T2A enters a valley and with the assistance of two dikes, creates Louriçal reservoir. From the reservoir, water enters channel C5 which directs it to the third Calçado reservoir which is partially created by the project's largest dike of 75 metres (246 ft) in height and 400 metres (1,300 ft) in length. The Calçado reservoir uses an outlet works to remove any excess water from the reservoir and help maintain appropriate levels.

Water from the reservoir then moves into the 73-metre (240 ft) long channel C6 which feeds the project's longest tunnel, T3, at 6.03 kilometres (3.75 mi) in length. From T3, water moves into the Antonina reservoir before reaching the 203-metre (666 ft) long channel C7 and then into the Peixe reservoir which is created with the assistance of three dikes. After the reservoir, the water is transferred to intake channel C8 and from there into three 300-metre (980 ft) long penstocks which feed the Simplício Power Plant's three Francis turbines. The penstocks provide 80 metres (260 ft) of hydraulic head and are at a 12.48 percent angle. Once the water is discharged from the power station, it returns to the Paraíba via a 760-metre (2,490 ft) long tailrace channel.

== Popular culture ==
The project was featured on Build It Bigger during a season 8 episode.
