= Jaguara Dam =

Dam in Rifaina, Brazil

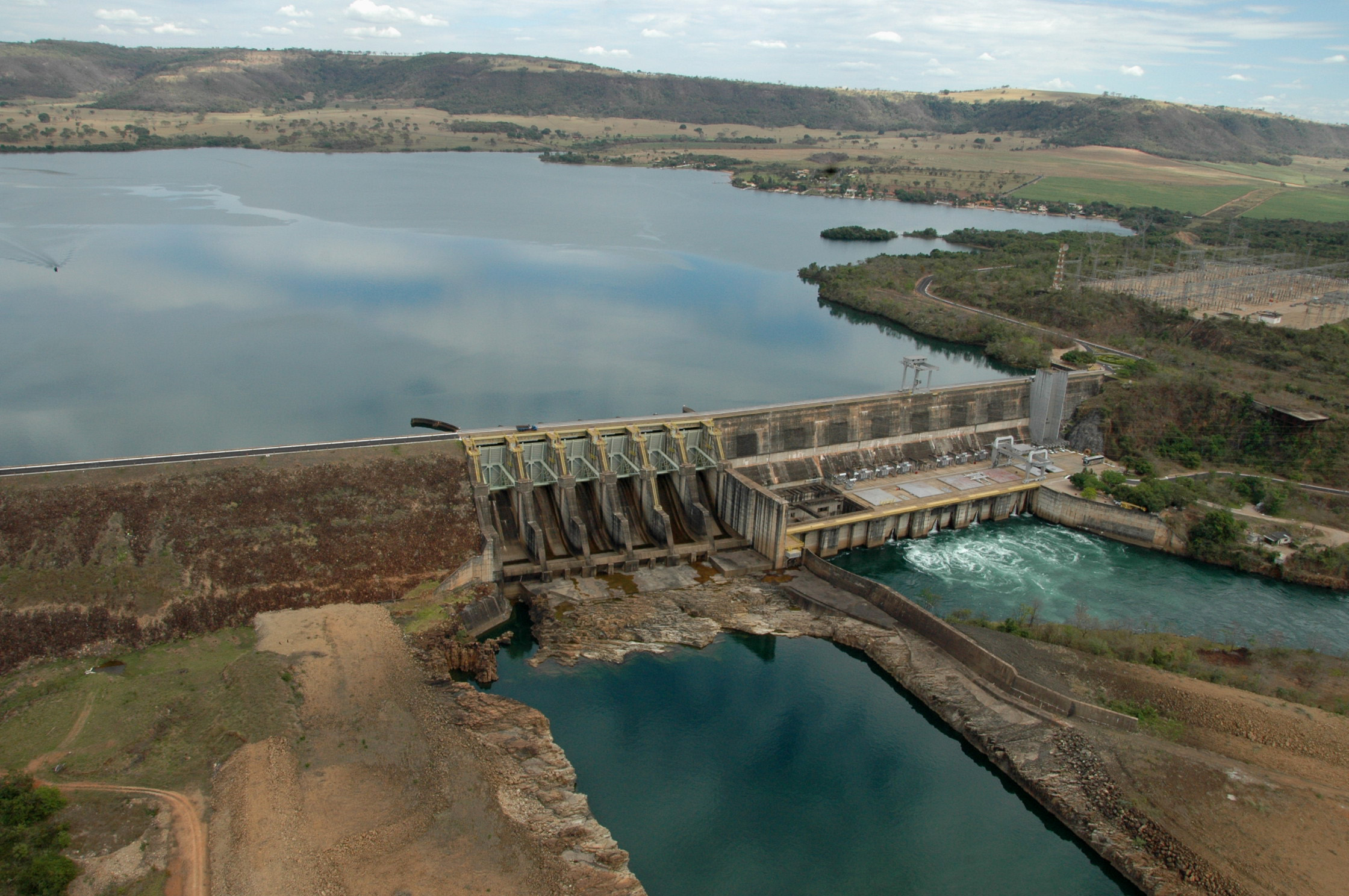

- Location within Brazil
- Official name: Usina Hidrelétrica de Jaguara
- Country: Brazil
- Location: Rifaina
- Coordinates: 20°01′25.73″S 47°26′01.41″W
- Purpose: Power
- Status: Operational
- Construction began: 1966
- Opening date: 1971
- Owner: CEMIG

Dam and spillways
- Impounds: Grande River
- Height: 40 m (130 ft)
- Length: 325 m (1,066 ft)
- Spillway type: Gate-controlled

Reservoir
- Total capacity: 470×10^{6} m^{3} (380,000 acre⋅ft)

Power Station
- Commission date: 1971
- Turbines: 4 x 106 MW (142,000 hp) Francis-type
- Installed capacity: 424 MW (569,000 hp)

The Jaguara Dam is an embankment dam on the Grande River about 6 kilometres (3.7 mi) north of Rifaina, Brazil. The dam is on the border of Conquista municipality in the state of Minas Gerais to the north and Rifaina municipality in the state of São Paulo to the south. It was constructed between 1966 and 1971 for the purpose of hydroelectric power generation. The power station at the dam has an installed capacity of 424 megawatts (569,000 hp) and is owned by CEMIG.

== See also ==
- List of power stations in Brazil
