= Celso Ramos =

- Municipality
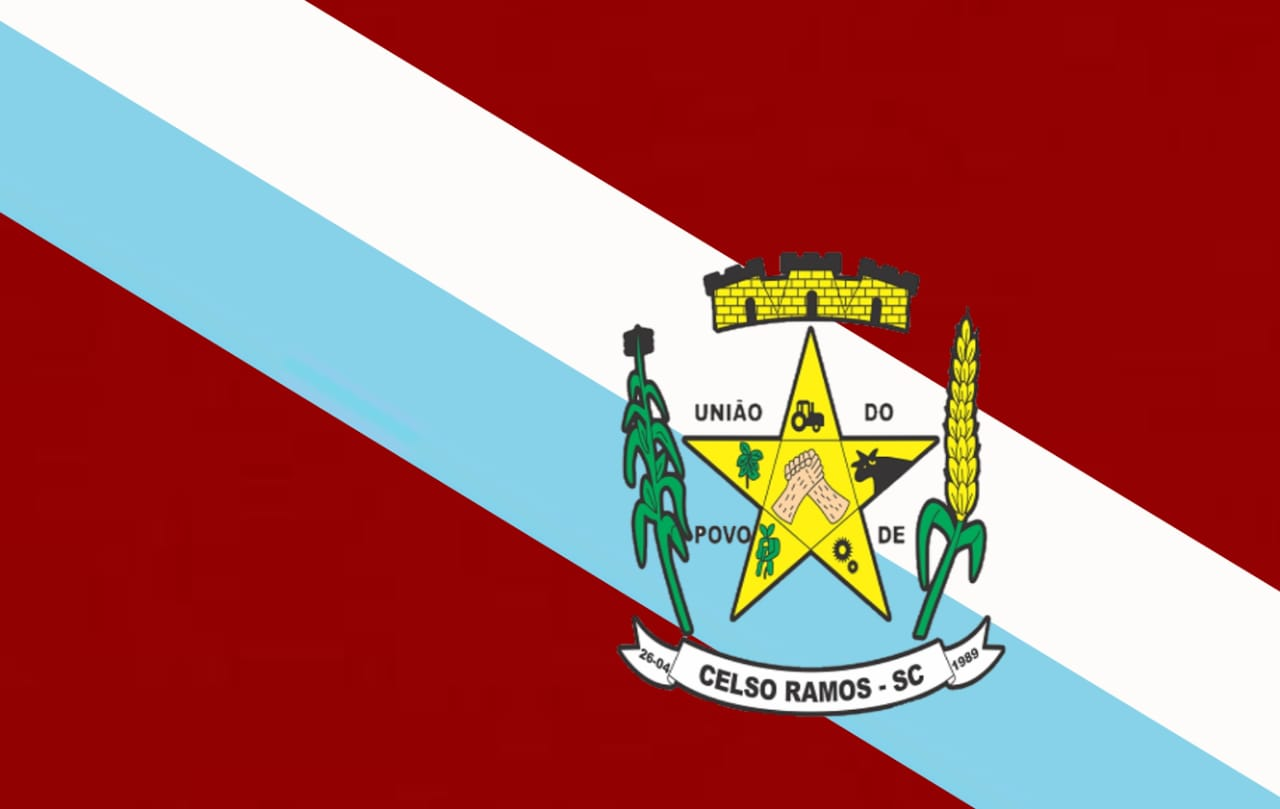
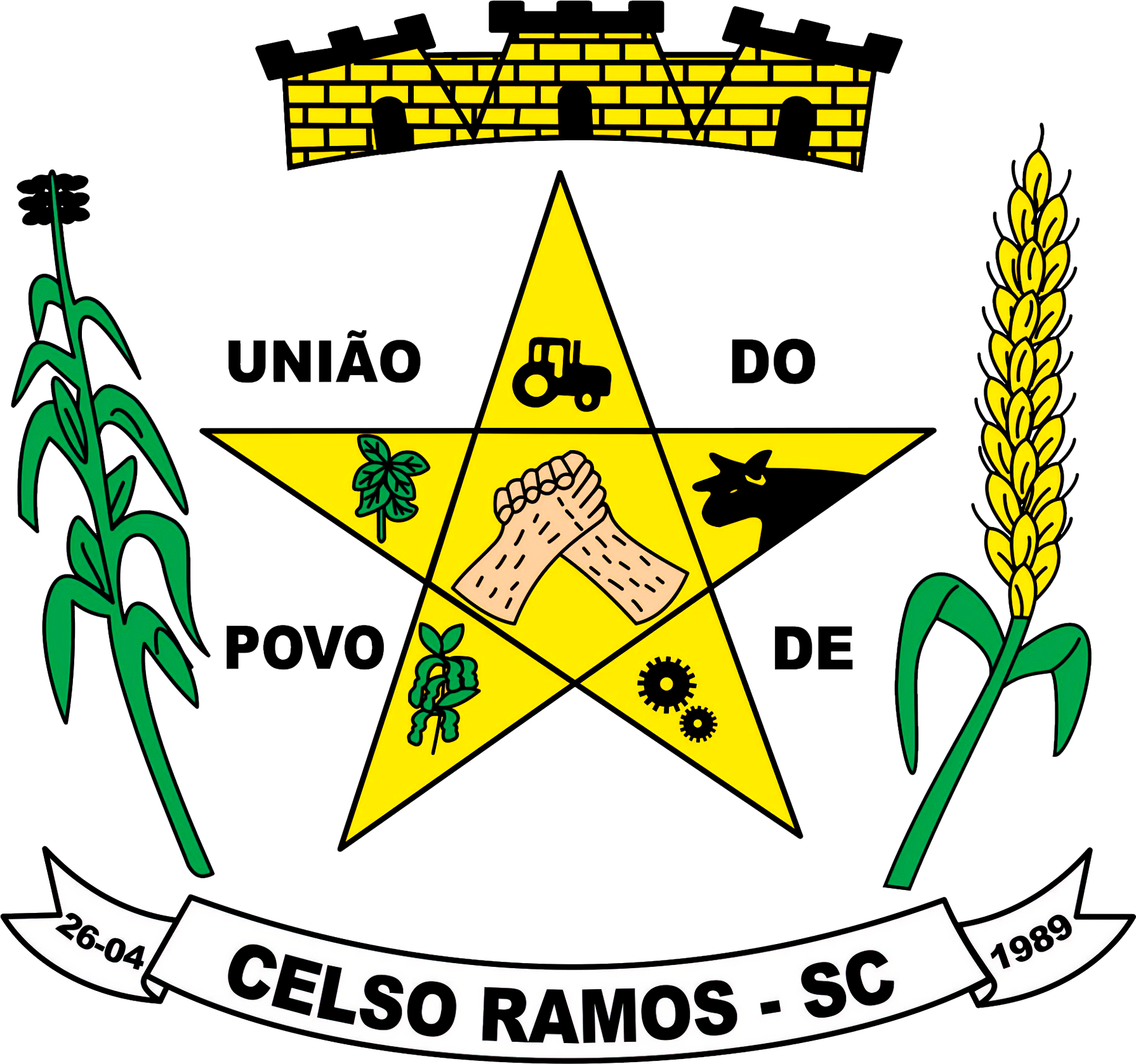
- Flag Coat of arms

- Location in Brazil
- Coordinates: 27°37′S 51°24′W
- Country: Brazil
- Region: South
- State: Santa Catarina
- Mesoregion: Serrana

Population (2020)
  - Total: 2,719
- Time zone: UTC -3

Celso Ramos is a municipality in the state of Santa Catarina in the South region of Brazil.

== See also ==
- List of municipalities in Santa Catarina
