= Volta Grande Dam =

- Location within Brazil
- Official name: Usina Hidrelétrica de Volta Grande
- Country: Brazil
- Location: Água Comprida
- Coordinates: 20°01′56.24″S 48°13′17.48″W
- Purpose: Power
- Status: Operational
- Construction began: 1970
- Opening date: 1974
- Owner: CEMIG

Dam and spillways
- Impounds: Grande River
- Height: 56 m (184 ft)
- Length: 2,329 m (7,641 ft)
- Spillway type: Gate-controlled

Reservoir
- Total capacity: 2,244×10^{6} m^{3} (1,819,000 acre⋅ft)

Power Station
- Commission date: 1974
- Type: Conventional
- Turbines: 4 x 95 MW (127,000 hp) Kaplan-type
- Installed capacity: 380 MW (510,000 hp)

The Volta Grande Dam is an embankment dam on the Grande River about 12 kilometres (7.5 mi) west of Água Comprida, Brazil. The dam is on the border of Conceição das Alagoas municipality in the state of Minas Gerais to the north and Miguelópolis municipality in the state of São Paulo to the south. It was constructed between 1970 and 1974 for the purpose of hydroelectric power generation. The power station at the dam has an installed capacity of 380 MW and is owned by CEMIG.

== See also ==
- List of power stations in Brazil
