= Furnas (surname) =

Furnas is a surname. Notable people with the surname include:

- Charles Furnas (1880–1941), first airplane passenger
- Clifford C. Furnas (1900–1969), author, Olympic athlete, scientist, expert on guided missiles, university president, and public servant
- Doug Furnas (1959–2012), American wrestler and powerlifter
- George Furnas (born 1954), professor and Associate Dean for Academic Strategy at the School of Information of the University of Michigan
- J. C. Furnas (1906–2001), American writer and historian
- Robert Wilkinson Furnas (1824–1905), second governor of Nebraska, USA
