= Nova Avanhandava Dam =

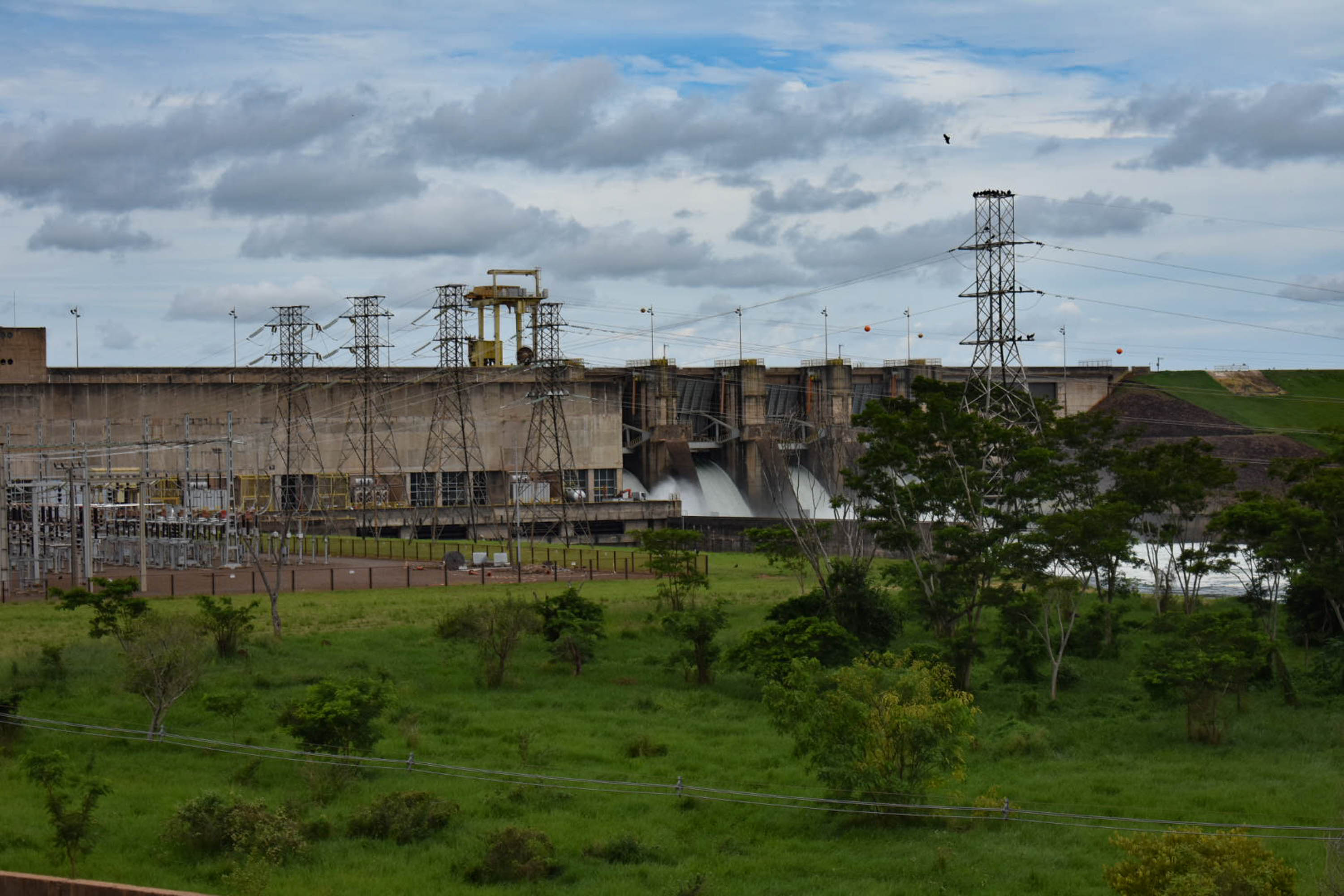

- Location within Brazil
- Official name: Barragem Nova Avanhandava
- Country: Brazil
- Location: Buritama, São Paulo
- Coordinates: 21°7′5.67″S 50°12′4.46″W
- Purpose: Power, navigation
- Status: Operational
- Opening date: 1982; 44 years ago

Dam and spillways
- Type of dam: Embankment with gravity sections
- Impounds: Tietê River
- Height: 71 m (233 ft)
- Length: 2,038 m (6,686 ft)
- Spillway capacity: 7,948 m^{3}/s (280,700 cu ft/s)

Reservoir
- Creates: Nova Avanhandava Reservoir
- Total capacity: 2,830,000,000 m^{3} (2,290,000 acre⋅ft)
- Surface area: 210 km^{2} (81 sq mi)
- Normal elevation: 358 m (1,175 ft)

Power Station
- Operator: AES Tietê
- Commission date: 1982
- Type: Conventional
- Hydraulic head: 29.7 m (97 ft)
- Turbines: 3 x 115.8 MW (155,300 hp) Kaplan-type
- Installed capacity: 347.4 MW (465,900 hp)

The Nova Avanhandava Dam is an embankment dam with gravity sections on the Tietê River about 8.5 km (5.3 mi) southwest of Buritama in São Paulo state of Brazil. It supports a 347.4 megawatts (465,900 hp) hydroelectric power station. The dam was completed in 1982 and its three 115.8 megawatts (155,300 hp) Kaplan turbine-generators were commissioned by the same year. It is owned and operated by AES Tietê. The dam also provides for navigation with two ship locks.
