= Eletrobras Furnas =

Eletrobras Furnas (Furnas - Centrais Elétricas SA)
- Company type: Sociedade Anônima (Public)
- Industry: Electricity
- Founded: February 28, 1957
- Headquarters: Rio de Janeiro, Brazil
- Area served: Brasília, São Paulo, Minas Gerais, Rio de Janeiro, Espírito Santo, Goiás, Tocantins, Mato Grosso, Paraná and Rondônia
- Products: Power generation
- Services: Electricity distribution Electric power transmission
- Parent: Eletrobras
- Website: furnas.com.br

Eletrobras Furnas (Furnas – Centrais Elétricas SA) is a regional power utility and a major subsidiary of Eletrobras. The company generates or transmits electricity to 51% of households in Brazil and more than 40% of the nation's electricity passes through their grid. The company has a generating capacity of 10,050 MW which corresponds to 10% of Brazil's electrical production.

== Overview ==
The company was founded on February 28, 1957, to support the fast-pace of urbanization in Brazil during the 1950s. Their aim was to develop the Grande River. They began construction of the Furnas Dam in February 1957. Their effective operation began in 1963 and in 1971, their headquarters moved to Rio de Janeiro. The company owns and maintains 12 hydroelectric power plants, two thermal power plants and 49 substations. Out of their 10,050 MW installed capacity, 7,971 is owned by them and the rest through partnerships. The company also maintains 19,000 km of transmission lines, 900 km of which are from the Itaipu Dam. They supply 97% of the electricity in Brasília, 92% in Rio de Janeiro, 91% in Mato Grosso, 81% in the Espírito Santo, 61% in Goiás, 58% in São Paulo, Minas Gerais 45% and 16% in Tocantins.

== Power plants ==
The hydroelectric power plants that the company owns and operates are the Baguari (140 MW), Corumbá (375 MW), Funil (216 MW), Furnas (1,216 MW), Itumbiara (2,082 MW), Luiz Carlos Barreto (1,050 MW), Manso (212 MW), Marimbondo (1,440 MW) Mascarenhas de Moraes (Peixoto) (476 MW), Peixe Angical (452 MW), Porto Colômbia (320 MW) and Serra da Mesa (1,275 MW) which is operated in a public partnership. They also own and manage the Campos (30 MW) and Santa Cruz (766 MW) thermal power plants.
