= Bento Munhoz Hydroelectric Plant =

Governor Bento Munhoz da Rocha Netto Dam
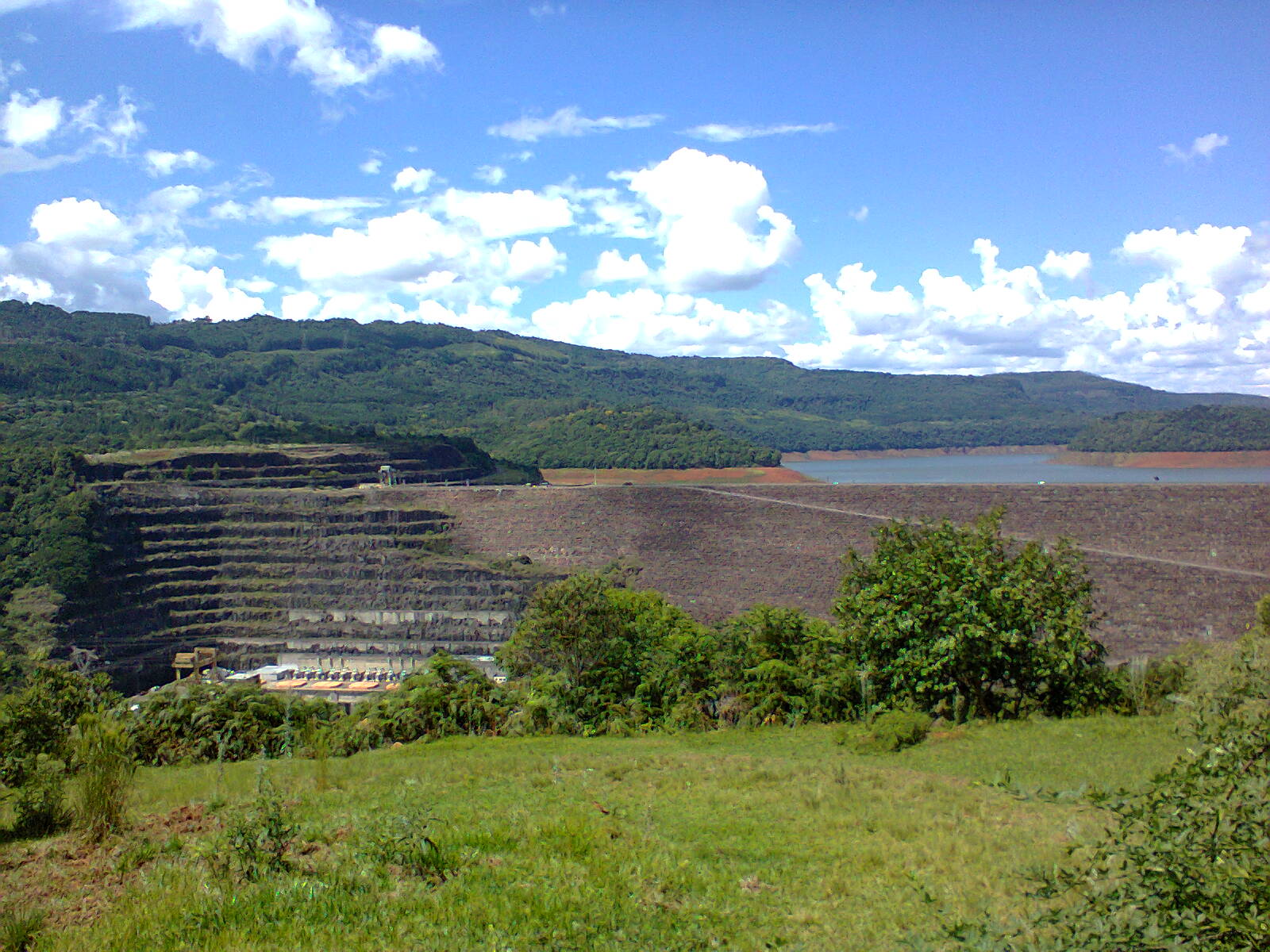

- Location within Brazil
- Official name: Governor Bento Munhoz da Rocha Netto Hydroelectric Plant
- Location: Foz do Areia, Paraná, Brazil
- Coordinates: 26°00′34″S 51°40′00″W
- Construction began: 1976
- Opening date: 1980
- Owner: Copel

Dam and spillways
- Type of dam: Embankment; concrete face, rock-fill
- Impounds: Iguazu River
- Height: 160 m (520 ft)
- Length: 828 m (2,717 ft)
- Dam volume: 14,138,000 m^{3} (499,300,000 cu ft)
- Spillway type: Service, controlled chute
- Spillway capacity: 11,000 m^{3}/s (390,000 cu ft/s)

Reservoir
- Creates: Governor Bento Munhoz da Rocha Netto Reservoir
- Total capacity: 6,066,000 dam^{3} (4,918,000 acre⋅ft)
- Surface area: 167 km^{2} (64 sq mi)

Power Station
- Commission date: 1980
- Turbines: 4 x 310 MW (420,000 hp) Francis turbines
- Installed capacity: 1,676 MW (2,248,000 hp)
- Annual generation: 4,002 GWh (14,410 TJ)

The Governor Bento Munhoz da Rocha Netto Hydroelectric Plant, formerly known as Foz do Areia, is dam and hydroelectric power plant on the Iguazu River near Foz do Areia in Paraná, Brazil. It is the furthest dam upstream of the Iguazu Falls and was constructed between 1976 and 1980. The power station has a 1,676 megawatts (2,248,000 hp) capacity and is supplied with water by a concrete face rock-fill embankment dam.

As their main power plant, it is owned and operated by Copel who renamed it after Bento Munhoz da Rocha Netto, governor of Paraná between 1951 and 1955.

== History ==
In May 1973, Copel was awarded the concession contract to construct the dam and by May 1974, various studies had recommended a site near the confluence of the Inguazu and Da Areia Rivers. By August of that year, a design was chosen and in October 1976 after contracts were awarded, construction began. The river was diverted with two 12 metres (39 ft) diameter and 600-metre (2,000 ft) long diversion tunnels. To facilitate the river's diversion, two cofferdams were constructed, one upstream and one downstream of the site. The upstream cofferdam was 45 metres (148 ft) high and allowed the diversion of up to 7,700 cubic metres per second (270,000 cu ft/s) of water. The dam began to impound the reservoir in 1980 and by October it was filled and complete.

At the time of completion, the dam was the tallest and largest concrete face rock-fill dam in the world. It was also the first of its type to have a reservoir of its size. The techniques to construction the dam were instrumental and an advancement as 50,000 cubic metres (1,800,000 cu ft) of fill was placed each month for two years in a row. The stability and integrity of such a large dam with a large reservoir helped bring confidence to its specific design.

== Dam ==
The Bento Munhoz da Rocha Netto Dam is an 828-metre (2,717 ft) long and 160-metre (520 ft) high concrete face rock-fill type. The dam contains a total 14,138,000 cubic metres (499,300,000 cu ft) of material which includes 14,000,000 cubic metres (490,000,000 cu ft) of rock-fill and 138,000 cubic metres (4,900,000 cu ft) of concrete. The dam's spillway is controlled by four 14.5-metre (48 ft) wide and 19.5-metre (64 ft) high tainter gates. It has an 11,000 cubic metres per second (390,000 cu ft/s) capacity and is 400 metres (1,300 ft) long and 70.6 metres (232 ft) wide. Water is brought towards the power station intake through a channel which is 450 metres (1,480 ft) long and 90 metres (300 ft) wide. The actual power intake structure is 70 metres (230 ft) high, 108 metres (354 ft) wide and allows for a maximum reservoir level depletion of 47 metres (154 ft). Six wheel-type gates facilitate bring water into the power station. An additional gate exists for maintenance purposes.

== Power station ==
From the intake, six 220-metre (720 ft) long penstocks deliver water to the generators as their diameter reduces from 7.4 to 7 metres (24 to 23 ft). The power station contains four 419 megawatts (562,000 hp) generators for a total installed capacity of 1,476 megawatts (1,979,000 hp). Space for an additional two generators exist and if installed would bring the plant's total installed capacity to 2,511 megawatts (3,367,000 hp).

== See also ==
- List of power stations in Brazil
