= Peixoto Dam =

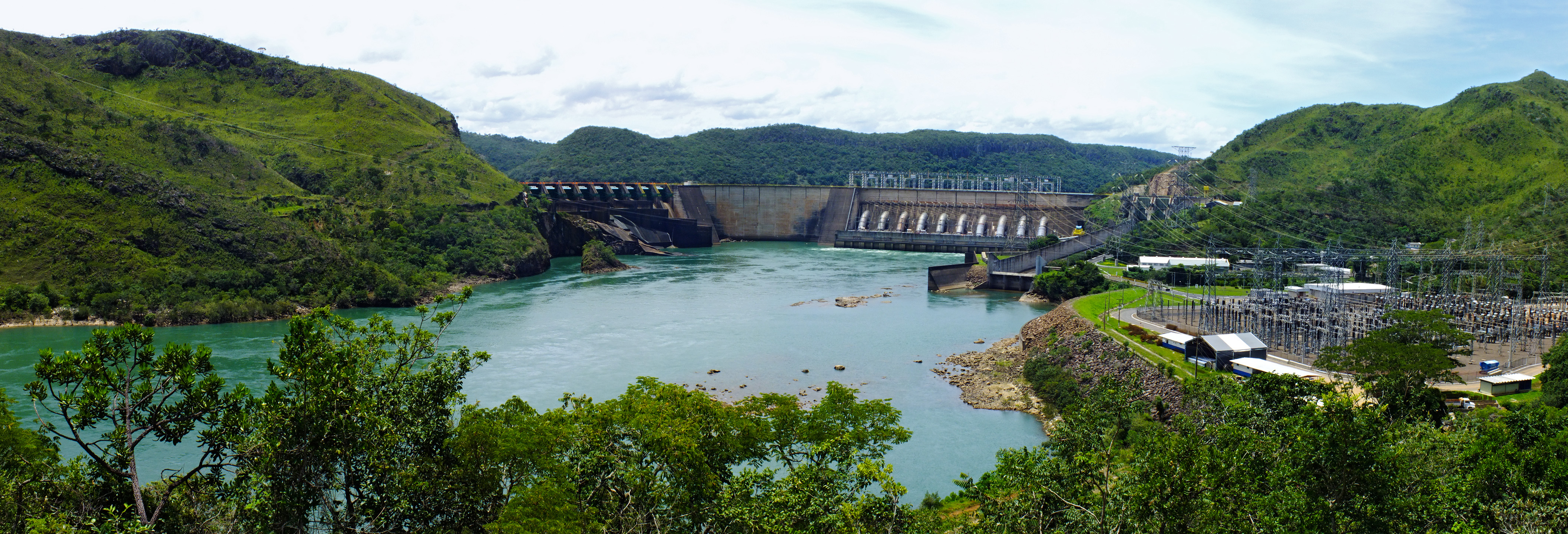

- Location within Brazil
- Location: Minas Gerais, Brazil
- Coordinates: 20°17′05″S 47°03′49″W
- Construction began: 1952
- Opening date: 1956
- Owner: Eletrobras Furnas

Dam and spillways
- Impounds: Grande River
- Height: 50.6 m (166 ft)
- Length: 600 m (2,000 ft)
- Spillway type: Gated overflow
- Spillway capacity: 12,450 m^{3}/s (440,000 cu ft/s)

Reservoir
- Creates: Represa dos Peixotos
- Total capacity: 4.04 km^{3} (3,280,000 acre⋅ft)
- Active capacity: 2.50 km^{3} (2,030,000 acre⋅ft)
- Surface area: 250 km^{2} (62,000 acres)

Power Station
- Turbines: 2x 40 MW (54,000 hp); 2x 48 MW (64,000 hp); 4x 49 MW (66,000 hp); 2x 52 MW (70,000 hp) Francis-type
- Installed capacity: 476 MW (638,000 hp)

Peixoto Dam, also known as Mascarenhas de Moraes Hydroelectric Plant, is a hydroelectric dam on the Grande River in the state of Minas Gerais, Brazil, about 20 kilometres (12 mi) west of Delfinópolis.

Studies for a dam at the Peixoto site were first carried out in 1947 by the Companhia Paulista de Força e Luz, which obtained rights to develop the site in 1950. The dam was built between 1952 and 1957 with help from the United States and the dam dedicated on April 30, 1957, by Brazilian President Juscelino Kubitschek. The first two Francis turbine-generators came online in 1957, and eight more were installed by 1968, bringing the plant to its full capacity of 476 megawatts (638,000 hp). Since 1973, the dam and hydroelectric power plant have been operated by Eletrobras Furnas. Peixoto was the first of a cascade of nine dams to be built on the Grande River.

The dam consists of a central concrete arch section flanked by gravity wings, totaling 50.6 metres (166 ft) high and 600 metres (2,000 ft) long, impounding the 145-kilometre (90 mi) long Represa de Peixoto (Peixoto Reservoir), with a storage capacity of 4.04 cubic kilometres (3,280,000 acre⋅ft) and a useful capacity of 2.50 cubic kilometres (2,030,000 acre⋅ft). The 210-by-25-metre (689 ft × 82 ft) power station is located on the south side of the dam and consists of ten vertical Francis turbines.

Water is released from the dam through the power plant and two spillways. The service spillway, located on the north side of the dam, is an overflow structure with 11 gates, providing a maximum capacity of 9,350 cubic metres per second (330,000 cu ft/s). The auxiliary spillway is located to the south and consists of a concrete chute controlled by two gates, with a capacity of 3,100 cubic metres per second (110,000 cu ft/s).

== See also ==
- List of power stations in Brazil
