= Rio Grande (Paraná River tributary) =

River in Brazil

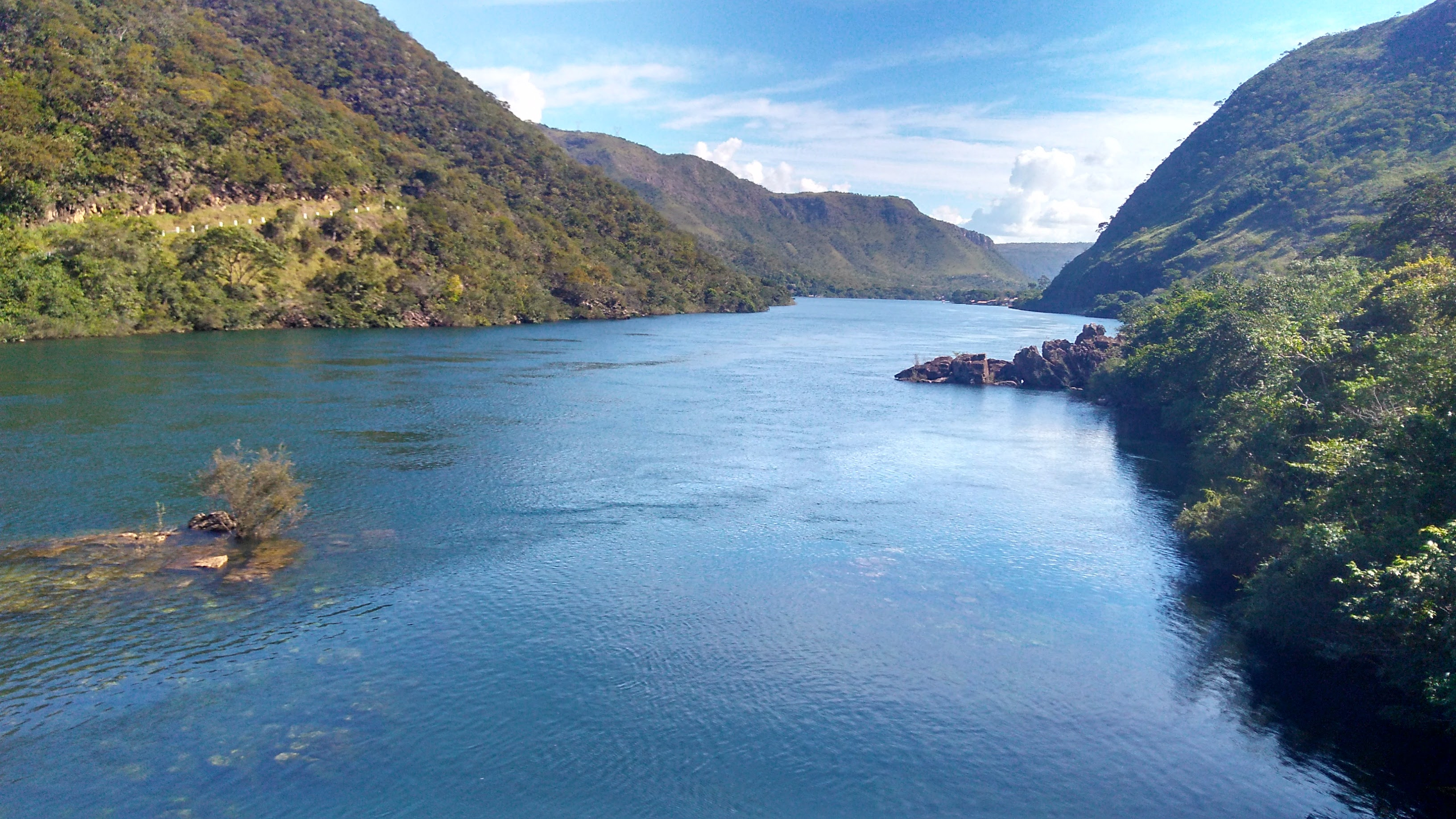

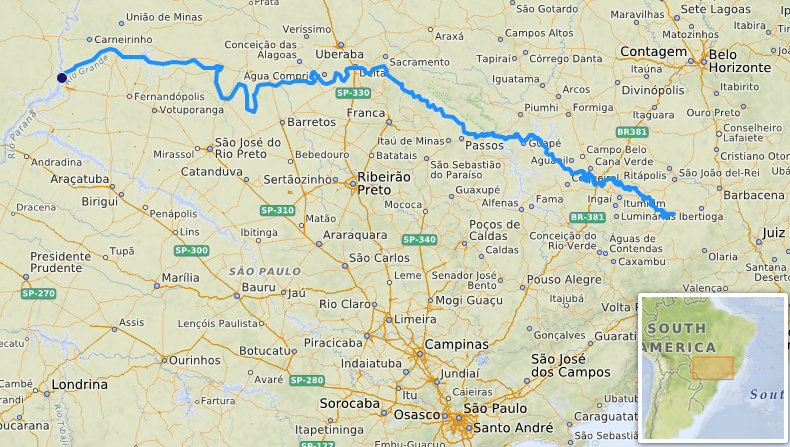
- Path of the Rio Grande

Location
- Country: Brazil
- State: Minas Gerais, São Paulo

Physical characteristics
- Source: Mantiqueira Mountains
  - location: Bocaina de Minas, Minas Gerais, Brazil
- Mouth: Paraná River
  - location: confluence with Paranaíba River, Brazil
  - coordinates: 20°4′41″S 50°59′41″W
- Length: 1,090 km (680 mi)

Basin features
- River system: Río de la Plata

Rio Grande (Portuguese for "great river") is a river in south-central Brazil. It rises in the Mantiqueira Mountains in the state of Minas Gerais and descends inland, west-northwestward. Its lower course marks a portion of the Minas Gerais-São Paulo border. At the Mato Grosso do Sul state border, after a course of 1,090 km (677 mi), it joins the Paranaíba River to form the Upper Paraná River.

Major tributaries of the Rio Grande are:

- Rio Aiuruoca, whose source is in Itamonte;
- Rio das Mortes, whose source lies between Barbacena and Senhora dos Remédios;
- Rio Jacaré, whose source is in the Serra do Galba;
- Rio Sapucaí, whose source is in the Mantiqueira Mountains in São Paulo;
- Rio Pardo, whose source is in Ipuiúna.

The basin of the Rio Grande belongs to the Paraná River basin. The basin has a total area of 143,000 km^{2} (55,213 mi^{2}), of which 86,500 km^{2} (33,398 mi^{2}) are located within Minas Gerais, which is equivalent to 17.8% of the state territory. The basin of the Rio Grande is responsible for about 67% of all energy generated in the state.

The Grande is interrupted by several dams and reservoirs; in the upper Grande the river forms Furnas Dam, then Peixotos Dam, and downstream, Luiz Barreto Dam, Jaguara Dam, Volta Grande Dam, Marimbondo Dam and Água Vermelha Dam.

The river plays a major role in production of electricity and, due to rapids and waterfalls, and absence of locks, is only navigable by small craft in limited stretches. However the Estrada de Ferro Oeste de Minas (a narrow gauge railway) operated a passenger and freight steam navigation service between 1889 and 1963. The EFOM met the Rio Grande at Ribeirão Vermelho, from where the service ran down the river for 208 km (129 mi), as far as Capetina. There were six stations on the river between Ribeirão Vermelho and Capetinga, and the railway operated a fleet of 6 stern-wheel paddle steamers, together with barges and launches. The service was halted by the completion of the Furnas Dam.

== See also ==
- Luiz Barreto (Estreito) Dam
- Marimbondo Dam
- Água Vermelha Dam
- Furnas Dam
- Parana River steamers
