= Ney Braga Hydroelectric Plant =

Governor Ney Braga de Barros Dam
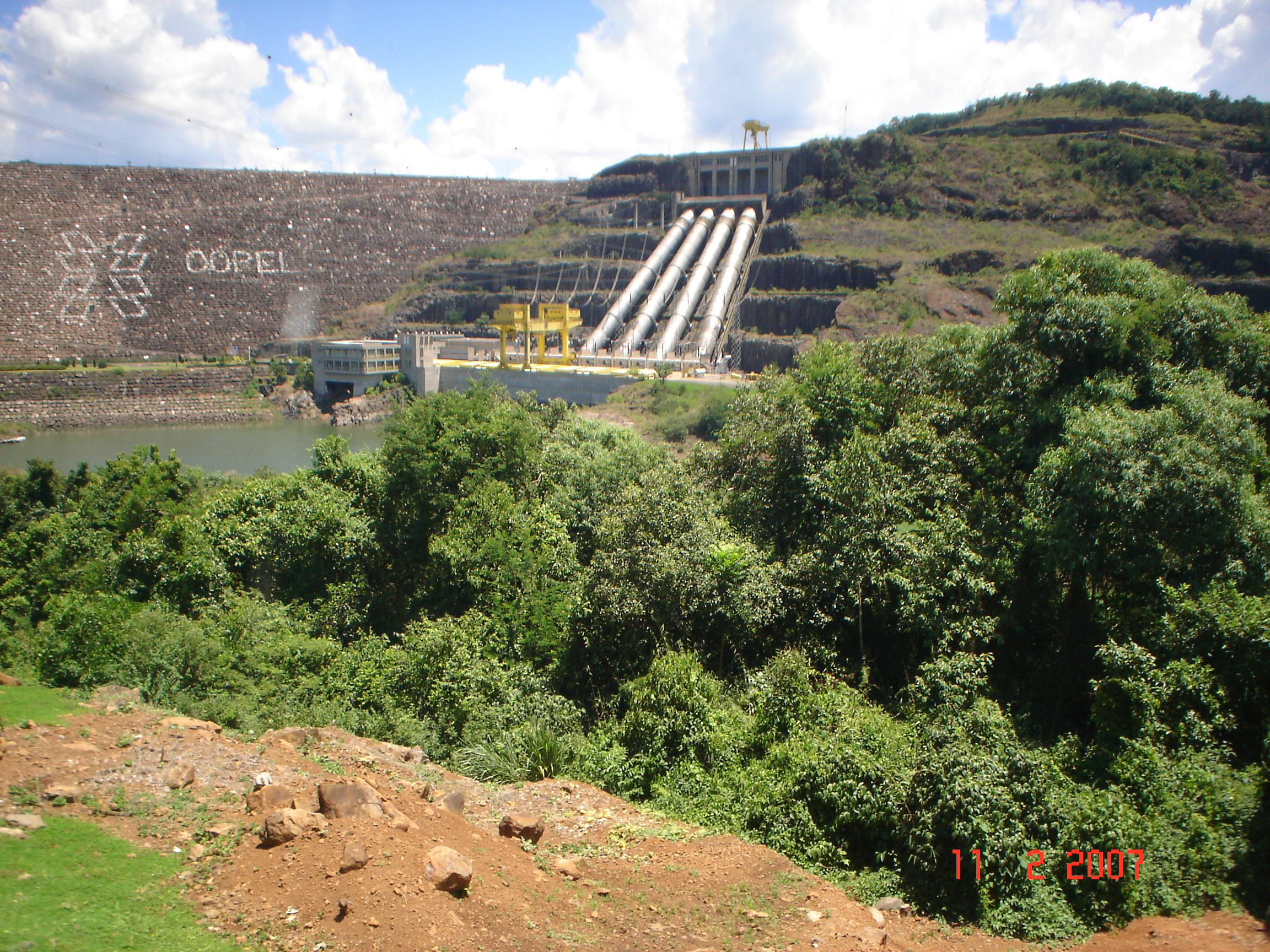
- The dam in 2008

- Location within Brazil
- Official name: Governor Ney Braga de Barros Hydroelectric Plant
- Location: Segredo, Paraná, Brazil
- Coordinates: 25°47′35″S 52°06′47″W
- Construction began: 1987
- Opening date: 1992
- Owner: Copel

Dam and spillways
- Type of dam: Embankment; concrete face, rock-fill
- Impounds: Iguazu River
- Height: 145 m (476 ft)
- Length: 700 m (2,300 ft)
- Spillway type: Service, controlled
- Spillway capacity: 50,000 m^{3}/s (1,800,000 cu ft/s)

Reservoir
- Creates: Governor Ney Braga de Barros Reservoir

Power Station
- Commission date: 1992
- Type: Conventional
- Turbines: 4 x 315 MW (422,000 hp) Francis turbines
- Installed capacity: 1,260 MW (1,690,000 hp)
- Annual generation: 3,662.2 GWh (13,184 TJ)

The Governor Ney Braga de Barros Hydroelectric Plant, formerly known as Segredo, is a dam and hydroelectric power plant on the Iguazu River near Segredo in Paraná, Brazil. It is the fourth dam upstream of the Iguazu Falls and was constructed between 1987 and 1991, being inaugurated in 1992. The power station has a 1,260 megawatts (1,690,000 hp) capacity and is supplied with water by a concrete face rock-fill embankment dam.

It is owned and operated by Copel who renamed it after Ney Braga de Barros, governor of Paraná between 1961–1965 and 1979–1982. It was the first hydroelectric project in Brazil's history to provide an Environmental Impact Assessment.

== History ==
Construction on the dam began in September 1987 with the diversion of the Iguazu River. The diversion tunnel was 778-metre (2,552 ft) long and had a diameter of 13.5 metres (44 ft), it was completed in June 1988. Excavations for the dam's foundation began in September 1988 and was completed in December 1989. Construction was complete in 1992.

== Ney Braga de Barros Dam ==
The Ney Braga de Barros Dam is 145 metres (476 ft) high, 700 metres (2,300 ft) long and is of concrete face, rock-fill design. Water from the Jordão River, 2 km southwest of the dam, is diverted through a 4,703-metre (15,430 ft) long and 9.5-metre (31 ft) diameter tunnel and into the Ney Braga de Barros Reservoir. The Jordão River is dammed 4.5 kilometres (2.8 mi) upstream of its mouth with the Iguazu River with a roller-compacted concrete dam. The water from the diverted river increases the reservoir inflows by 10%. The power station contains 4 x 315 megawatts (422,000 hp) generators.

== See also ==
- List of power stations in Brazil
