= Salto Santiago Hydroelectric Power Plant =

Salto Santiago Dam
- Location within Brazil
- Official name: Salto Santiago Hydroelectric Power Plant
- Location: Saudade do Iguaçu, Paraná, Brazil
- Coordinates: 25°37′04″S 52°36′48″W
- Opening date: 1980
- Owner: Tractebel Energia

Dam and spillways
- Type of dam: Embankment, rock-fill
- Impounds: Iguazu River
- Height: 80 m (260 ft)
- Length: 1,400 m (4,600 ft)
- Dam volume: 518,200 m^{3} (18,300,000 ft^{3}) (Concrete)
- Spillway type: Service, controlled
- Spillway capacity: 24,000 m^{3}/s (850,000 cu ft/s)

Reservoir
- Creates: Salto Santiago Reservoir
- Total capacity: 4,094,000,000 m^{3} (3,319,000 acre⋅ft)
- Catchment area: 43,330 km^{2} (16,730 mi^{2})
- Surface area: 208 km^{2} (80 mi^{2})

Power Station
- Commission date: 1980-1982
- Type: Conventional
- Turbines: 4 x 355 MW (476,000 hp) Francis turbines
- Installed capacity: 1,420 MW (1,900,000 hp)
- Annual generation: 2,137.46 GWh (7,694.9 TJ)

The Salto Santiago Hydroelectric Power Plant is a dam and hydroelectric power plant on the Iguazu River near Santiago in Paraná, Brazil. It is the third dam upstream of the Iguazu Falls and was completed in 1979. The power station has a 1,420 MW capacity and is supplied with water by a rock-fill embankment dam.

It is owned and operated by Tractebel Energia.

== Salto Santiago Dam ==
The Salto Santiago Dam is 80 metres (260 ft) high, 1,400 metres (4,600 ft) long and is of rock-fill embankment type, comprising 518,200 cubic metres (18,300,000 cu ft) in concrete structure. The dam's spillways contains nine 21.5-metre (71 ft) wide and 15.3-metre (50 ft) wide radial gates and has a maximum capacity of 24,000 cubic metres per second (850,000 cu ft/s). The reservoir formed behind the dam contains 4,094,000,000 cubic metres (3,319,000 acre⋅ft) of total storage with a surface area of 208 square kilometres (80 sq mi) and a catchment area of 43,330 square kilometres (16,730 sq mi). The average flow of the river through the dam is 902 cubic metres per second (31,900 cu ft/s) and the reservoir has a normal operating level of 506 metres (1,660 ft).

== Power plant ==
The power plant at the southern end of the dam contains four 355 megawatts (476,000 hp) hydroelectric generators powered by Francis turbines. Each turbine has a rated discharge of 346 cubic metres per second (12,200 cu ft/s) and is fed by a 7.6-metre (25 ft) diameter steel penstock which provides a gross hydraulic head of 106 metres (348 ft). The remaining two penstocks are intended for future generators with a plant expansion. The first generator was commissioned on December 31, 1980, with another in 1981, two in 1982 the last of which was commissioned on September 16, 1982.

== See also ==
- List of power stations in Brazil
