= Água Vermelha Dam =

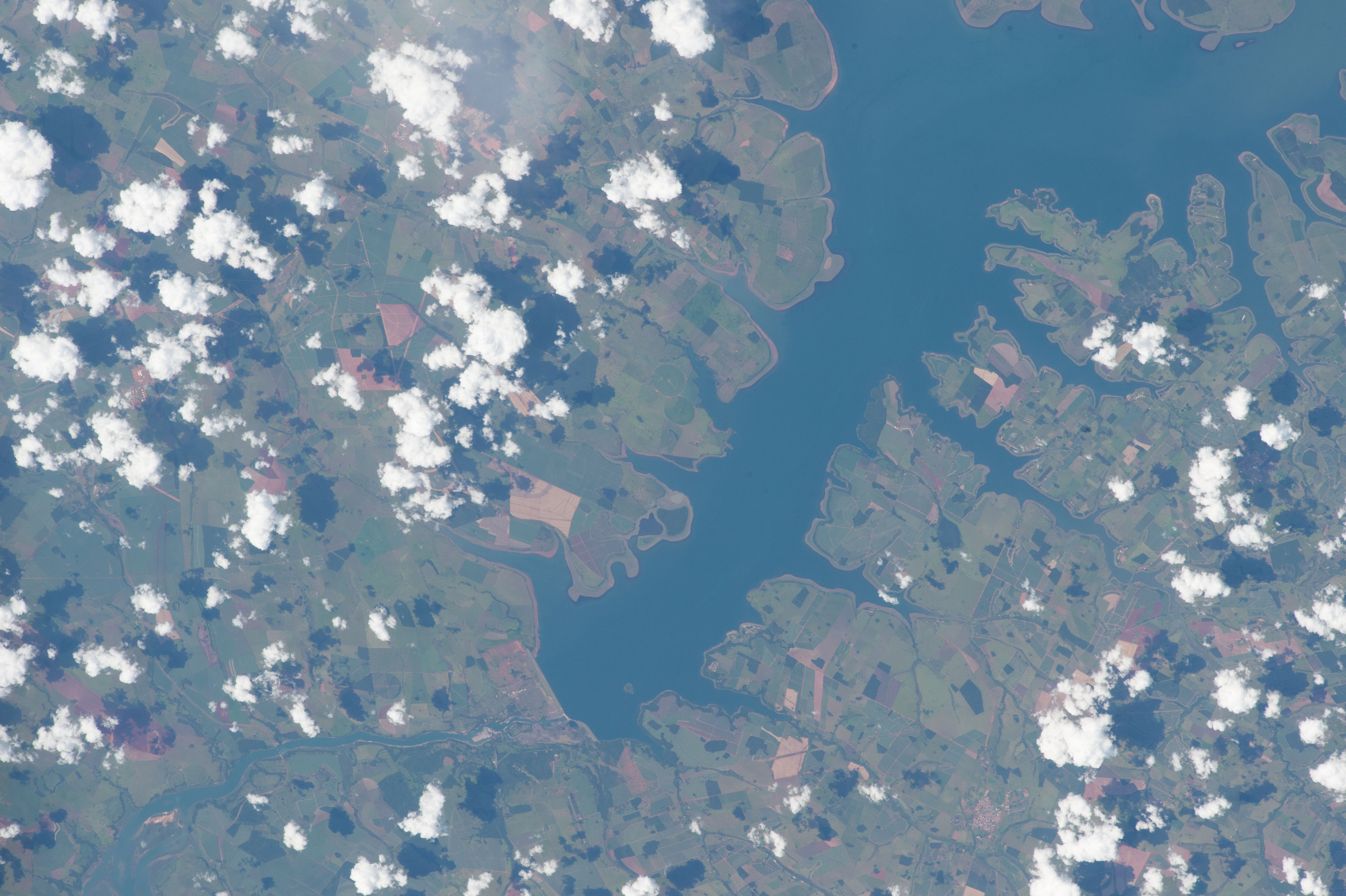
- The Água Vermelha Dam and reservoir photographed from the International Space Station, April 2015

- Location within Brazil
- Official name: Usina de Água Vermelha
- Location: Iturama, São Paulo/Minas Gerais, Brazil
- Coordinates: 19°51′55″S 50°20′48″W
- Construction began: 1973
- Opening date: 1978
- Owner: AES Tiete

Dam and spillways
- Type of dam: Embankment, concrete portion
- Impounds: Grande River
- Height: 67 m (220 ft)
- Length: 3,940 m (12,930 ft)
- Dam volume: 1,500,000 m^{3} (53,000,000 cu ft) (Concrete)
- Spillway type: Service, gate-controlled
- Spillway capacity: 19,848 m^{3}/s (700,900 cu ft/s)

Reservoir
- Creates: Água Vermelha Reservoir
- Total capacity: 11.025 km^{3} (8,938,000 acre⋅ft)
- Surface area: 647 km^{2} (250 sq mi)

Power Station
- Commission date: 1978-1979
- Type: Conventional
- Hydraulic head: 57 m (187 ft)
- Turbines: 6 x Francis turbines
- Installed capacity: 1,396.2 MW (1,872,300 hp)

The Água Vermelha Dam is an embankment dam on the Grande River near Iturama in Minas Gerais/São Paulo, Brazil. It was constructed for hydroelectric power production and flood control. Construction on the dam began in 1973 and it was completed and operational by 1978. The last generators were operational in 1979.

== Specifications ==
The dam is a 3,940 metres (12,930 ft) long and 67 metres (220 ft) high embankment dam with a concrete power station and spillway portion. The volume of concrete in the dam structure is 1,500,000 cubic metres (53,000,000 cu ft). The dam's spillway contains eight floodgates each with a maximum discharge capacity of 2,481 cubic metres per second (87,600 cu ft/s) for a total of 19,848 cubic metres per second (700,900 cu ft/s). The dam's reservoir has a capacity of 11.025 cubic kilometres (8,938,000 acre⋅ft), of which 11 cubic kilometres (8,900,000 acre⋅ft) is live (active or "useful") storage. The surface area of the reservoir is 647 km^{2} (250 mi^{2}) and its maximum level above sea level is 383.3 m (1,258 ft) and the minimum is 373.3 metres (1,225 ft). The dam's power station has a gross hydraulic head of 57 metres (187 ft) and contains six 232.7 MW (312,100 hp) generators powered by Francis turbines for a total installed capacity of 1,396.2 megawatts (1,872,300 hp).

== See also ==
- List of power stations in Brazil
