= Buritama =

Municipality in the state of São Paulo in Brazil

- Municipality
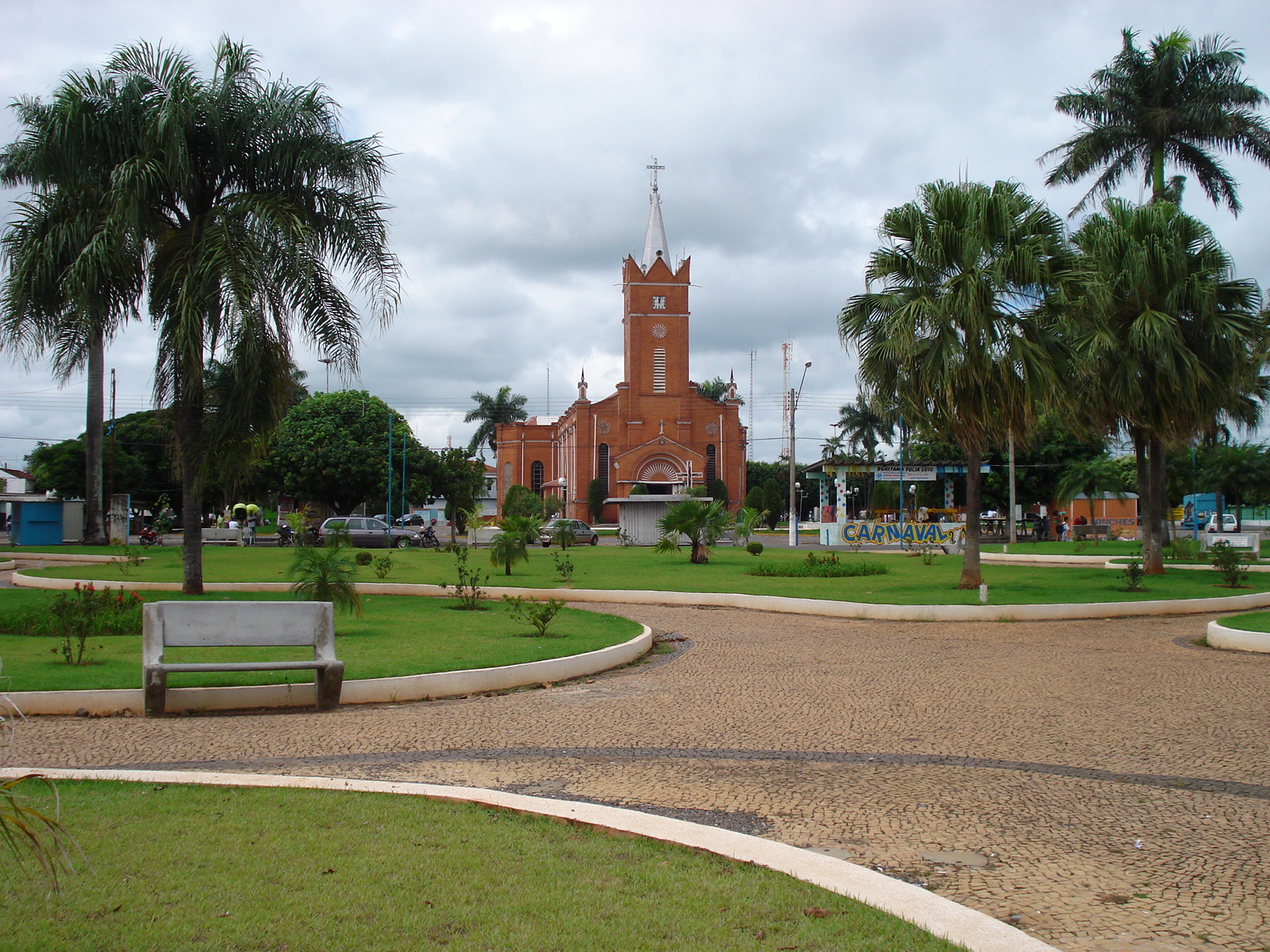

- Flag Coat of arms

- Location in São Paulo state

- Location in Brazil
- Coordinates: 21°4′0″S 50°8′51″W
- Country: Brazil
- Region: Southeast
- State: São Paulo

Area
  - Total: 327 km^{2} (126 sq mi)

Population (2020)
  - Total: 17,281
  - Density: 52.8/km^{2} (137/sq mi)
- Time zone: UTC−3 (BRT)

Buritama is a municipality in the state of São Paulo in Brazil. The population is 17,281 (2020 est.) in an area of 327 km^{2}.

== History ==
The municipality was created by state law in 1948.

Map of the state of São Paulo (1948).

== Demographics ==
Historical population (municipality)
Year	Population	%±
1950	8,899	—
1960	6,241	−29.9%
1970	10,019	60.5%
1980	11,564	15.4%
1991	12,766	10.4%
2000	13,854	8.5%
2010	15,418	11.3%
2022	17,210	11.6%

== Media ==
In telecommunications, the city was served by Companhia de Telecomunicações do Estado de São Paulo until 1975, when it began to be served by Telecomunicações de São Paulo. In July 1998, this company was acquired by Telefónica, which adopted the Vivo brand in 2012.

The company is currently an operator of cell phones, fixed lines, internet (fiber optics/4G) and television (satellite and cable).

== See also ==
- List of municipalities in São Paulo
- Interior of São Paulo
