= Marimbondo Dam =

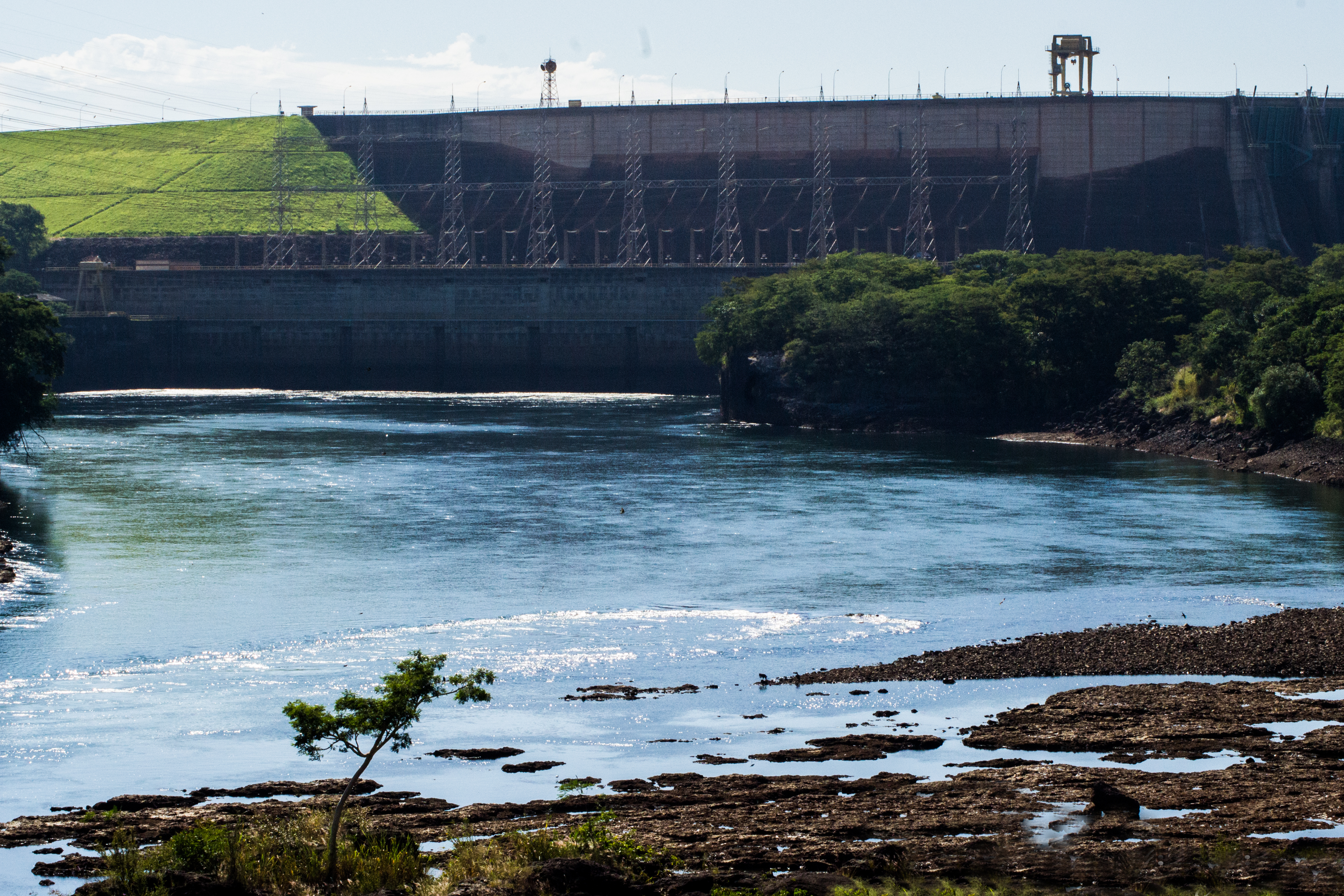

- Location within Brazil
- Official name: Usina de Marimbondo
- Location: Fronteira, Minas Gerais, Brazil
- Coordinates: 20°18′14″S 49°11′52″W
- Construction began: 1971
- Opening date: 1975
- Operator: Eletrobrás Furnas

Dam and spillways
- Type of dam: Embankment
- Impounds: Grande River
- Height: 94 m (308 ft)
- Length: 3,100 m (10,200 ft)
- Width (crest): 10 m (33 ft)
- Dam volume: 14.4×10^{6} m^{3} (510×10^{6} cu ft)
- Spillway type: Service, gate-controlled
- Spillway capacity: 21,400 m^{3}/s (760,000 cu ft/s)

Reservoir
- Creates: Marimbondo Reservoir
- Total capacity: 6,150×10^{6} m^{3} (4,990,000 acre⋅ft)
- Surface area: 438 km^{2} (169 sq mi)

Power Station
- Commission date: 1975-1977
- Type: Conventional
- Turbines: 8 x 180 MW (240,000 hp) Francis-type
- Installed capacity: 1,440 MW (1,930,000 hp)

The Marimbondo Dam is an embankment dam on the Grande River near Fronteira in Minas Gerais, Brazil. The dam serves an associated hydroelectric power plant with a 1,440 megawatts (1,930,000 hp) installed capacity.

== Background ==
Owned and maintained by Eletrobrás Furnas, the dam was their fourth power plant constructed. Construction began in 1971 and was complete in 1975 when the first generator went online. The last of the eight generators went online in January 1977.

== Specifications ==
The Marimbondo Dam is a 3,100 metres (10,200 ft) long and 94 metres (308 ft) high earth-fill embankment dam with a concrete spillway and power house section. The total structural volume of materials for the dam is 14,400,000 cubic metres (510,000,000 cu ft). The dam's spillway contains nine floodgates that are 15 metres (49 ft) wide and 18.85 metres (61.8 ft) high each. In total, the spillway has a 21,400 cubic metres per second (760,000 cu ft/s) discharge capacity.

== Reservoir ==
The reservoir created by the dam has a surface area of 438 square kilometres (169 sq mi) and capacity of 6,150 million cubic metres (217×10^{9} cu ft) with 5,260 million cubic metres (186×10^{9} cu ft) serving as live (active or "useful") storage. The normal reservoir level is 446.3 metres (1,464 ft) above sea level and the maximum is 447.36 metres (1,467.7 ft).

== Marimbondo Hydroelectric Power Plant ==
Marimbondo Hydroelectric Power Plant is 25.3 metres (83 ft) wide and 250.2 metres (821 ft) long and contains eight 180 megawatts (240,000 hp) generators that are powered by Francis turbines.

== See also ==
- List of power stations in Brazil
