= Salto Osório Hydroelectric Power Plant =

Salto Osório Dam
- Location within Brazil
- Official name: Salto Osório Hydroelectric Power Plant
- Location: Osório, Paraná, Brazil
- Coordinates: 25°32′06″S 53°00′33″W
- Opening date: 1975
- Owner: Tractebel Energia

Dam and spillways
- Type of dam: Embankment, rock-fill
- Impounds: Iguazu River
- Height: 56 m (184 ft)
- Length: 750 m (2,460 ft)
- Spillway type: Service, controlled
- Spillway capacity: 28,000 m^{3}/s (990,000 cu ft/s)

Reservoir
- Creates: Salto Osório Reservoir
- Total capacity: 403,000,000 m^{3} (327,000 acre⋅ft) (Live storage)
- Catchment area: 45,800 km^{2} (17,700 sq mi)
- Surface area: 51 km^{2} (20 sq mi)

Power Station
- Commission date: 1975-1981
- Type: Conventional
- Turbines: 6 x Francis turbines
- Installed capacity: 1,078 MW (1,446,000 hp)

The Salto Osório Hydroelectric Power Plant is a dam and hydroelectric power plant on the Iguazu River near Osório in Paraná, Brazil. It is the second dam upstream of the Iguazu Falls and was completed in 1979. The power station has a 1,078 MW capacity and is supplied with water by a rock-fill embankment dam.

It is owned and operated by Tractebel Energia.

== Salto Osório Dam ==
The Salto Osório Dam is 56 metres (184 ft) high, 750 metres (2,460 ft) long and is of rock-fill embankment type. The dam has two spillways containing 9 20.77 metres (68.1 ft) wide and 15.33 metres (50.3 ft) wide radial gates and has a maximum capacity of 28,000 cubic metres per second (990,000 cu ft/s). Each spillway is on the main structure and the northern spillway contains 4 floodgates with 5 located next to the power station. The reservoir formed behind the dam contains 403,000,000 cubic metres (327,000 acre⋅ft) of live storage with a surface area of 51 square kilometres (20 sq mi) and a catchment area of 45,800 square kilometres (17,700 sq mi). The average flow of the river through the dam is 937 cubic metres per second (33,100 cu ft/s) and the normal operating level of the reservoir is 397 metres (1,302 ft) above sea level.

== Power plant ==
The power plant at the southern end of the dam contains six hydroelectric generators powered by Francis turbines. Four of the turbines were manufactured by Mitsubishi and the other two turbines were manufactured by Hitachi. Each turbine has a rated discharge of 289 cubic metres per second (10,200 cu ft/s) and is fed by a 7.4 metres (24 ft) diameter steel penstock which provides a gross hydraulic head of 82 metres (269 ft). The first generator was commissioned on October 17, 1975, with another later that year, two in 1976, another in 1980 and the final June 21, 1981. Tractebel Energia, the owners of the power plant began a refurbishment of the turbines in 2005.

== See also ==
- List of power stations in Brazil
