= Rifaina =

- Municipality
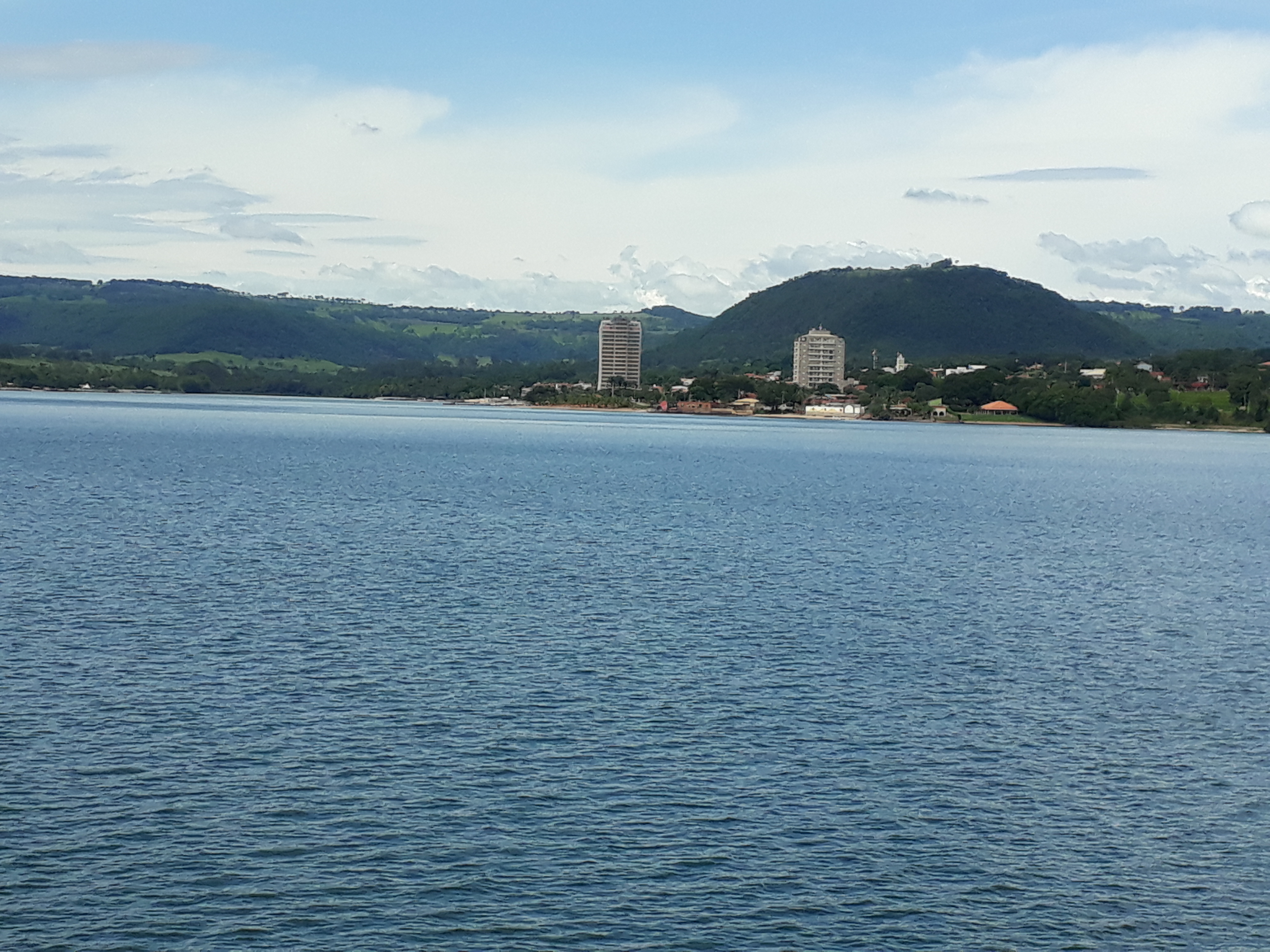

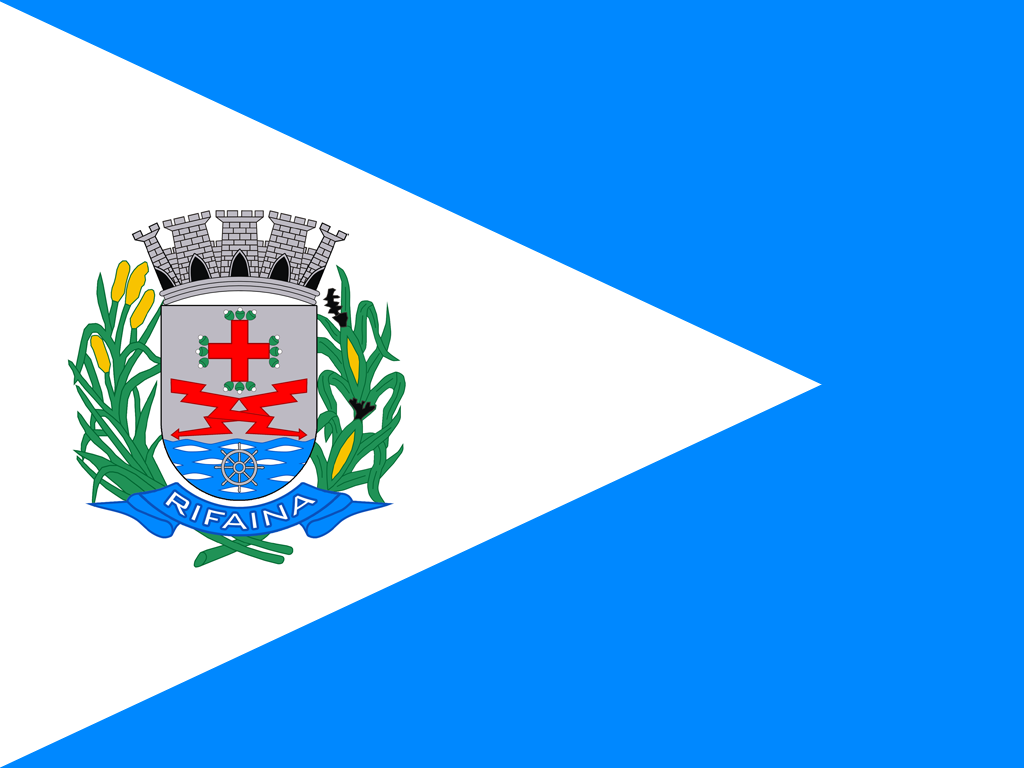
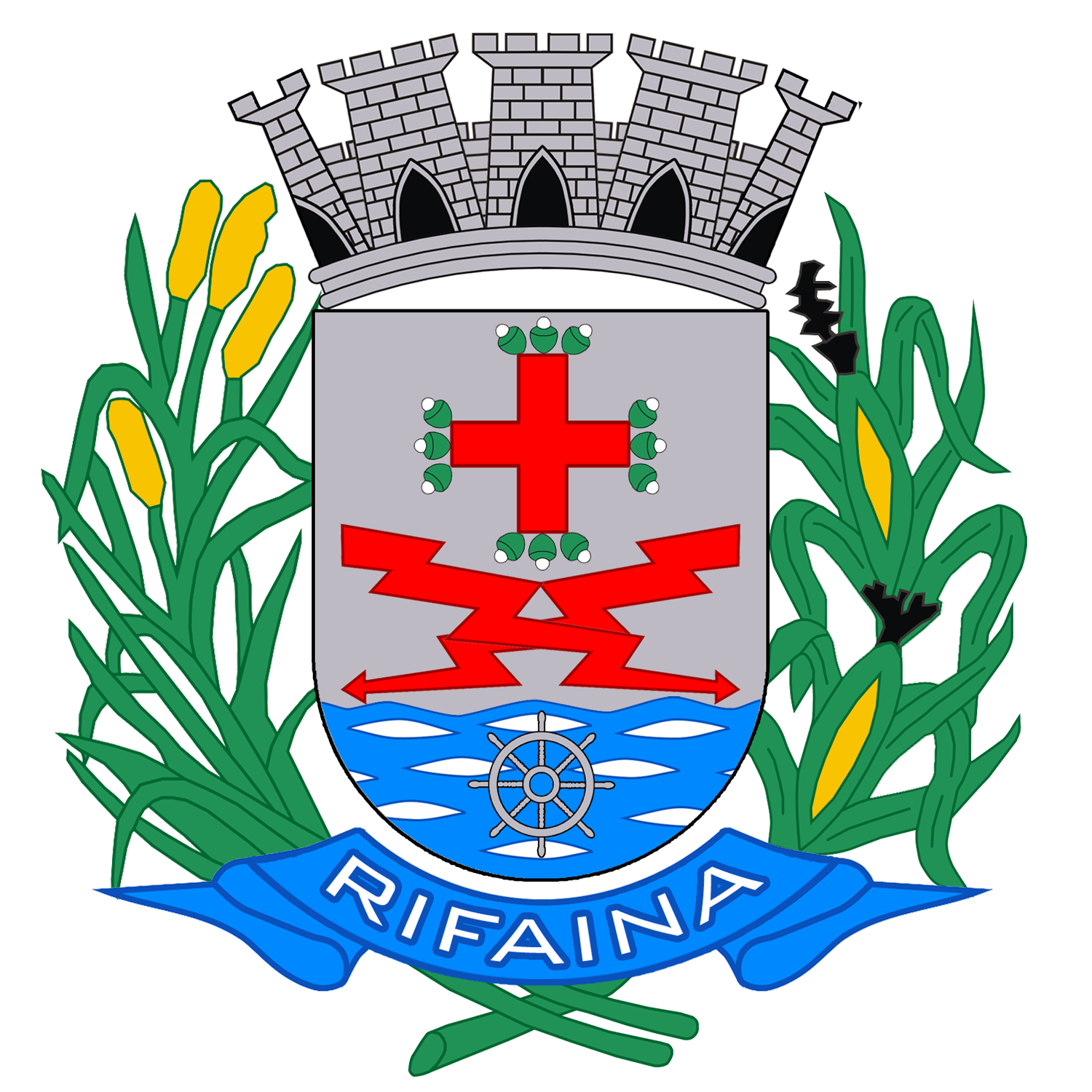
- Flag Coat of arms

- Location in São Paulo state

- Location in Brazil
- Coordinates: 20°4′50″S 47°25′17″W
- Country: Brazil
- Region: Southeast
- State: São Paulo
- Established: 24 December 1948
- Founder: Coronel José Francisco de Paulo, Coronel Manuel Cassiano e o Barão de Rifaina.

Government
  - Mayor: Hugo Lourenço (PPS)

Area
  - Total: 171.583 km^{2} (66.249 sq mi)

Population (2020)
  - Total: 3,640
  - Density: 21.2/km^{2} (54.9/sq mi)
- Demonym: Rifainense
- Time zone: UTC−3 (BRT)
- Postal code: 14490-000
- Area code: 16
- HDI: 0.740
- Website: www.rifaina.sp.gov.br

Rifaina (Portuguese pronunciation: [ʁiˈfɐ̃jnɐ]) is a municipality in the state of São Paulo in Brazil. The population is 3,640 (2020 est.) in an area of 163 km^{2} (63 sq mi). The elevation is 575 m.

== History ==
The municipality was created by state law in 1948.

Map of the state of São Paulo (1948).

== Media ==
In telecommunications, the city was served by Telecomunicações de São Paulo. In July 1998, this company was acquired by Telefónica, which adopted the Vivo brand in 2012. The company is currently an operator of cell phones, fixed lines, internet (fiber optics/4G) and television (satellite and cable).

== See also ==
- List of municipalities in São Paulo
