= Furnas Dam =

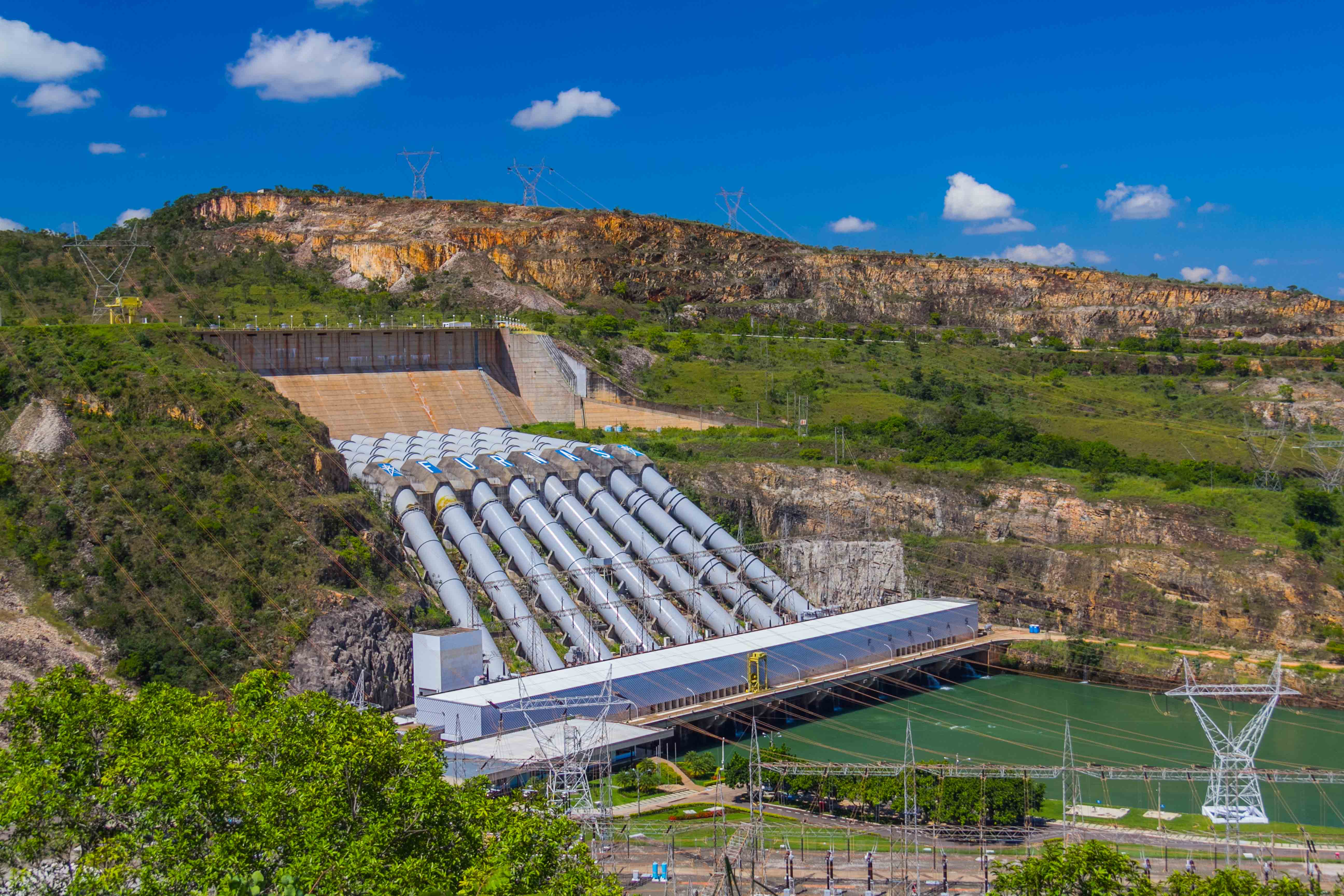
- Interactive map of Furnas Dam
- Location: Minas Gerais, Brazil
- Coordinates: 20°40′11″S 46°19′05″W
- Construction began: 1957
- Opening date: 1963
- Operator: Eletrobrás Furnas

Dam and spillways
- Impounds: Grande River
- Height: 127 m (417 ft)
- Length: 550 m (1,800 ft)
- Width (base): 15 m (49 ft)

Reservoir
- Creates: Furnas Reservoir
- Total capacity: 22,590×10^{6} m^{3} (18,310,000 acre⋅ft)
- Surface area: 1,473 km^{2} (569 sq mi)

Power Station
- Turbines: 8 × 152 MW (204,000 hp) Francis-type
- Installed capacity: 1,216 MW (1,631,000 hp)

The Furnas Dam (Portuguese: Usina Hidrelétrica de Furnas) is a hydroelectric dam in the Minas Gerais state of Brazil. A small settlement was built near the dam with the same name to house the workers during the dam construction. The main purpose of the dam and reservoir are the production of electricity and the regulation of the flow of the Grande River. Near the beginning of 2022, mass amounts of rain caused a large rock to fall and kill 10 people.

== Construction ==
Construction on the dam began in 1957 and was the first large dam in Brazil. It was built by Wimpey Construction and was completed in 1963. It is built on the canyon of the Grande River, before joining the Sapucaí River downstream. The dam is 127 metres (417 ft) tall, 550 metres (1,800 ft) long, and 15 metres (49 ft) wide at its crest.

The large reservoir, with a surface area of 1,473 square kilometres (569 sq mi), started to form in 1963, bordering thirty-four municipalities. The volume of water is seven times that of Guanabara Bay, at 22,590 million cubic metres (18,310,000 acre⋅ft). Normal water level averages at 768 metres (2,520 ft).

== See also ==
- List of power stations in Brazil
- Capitólio rockfall
