= List of power stations in Brazil =

Location of largest power stations in Brazil: nuclear, coal/oil/gas, hydroelectric

The following page lists the power stations in Brazil.

== Coal ==
Station	Community	Coordinates	Capacity (MW)	Year commissioned	Operator	Notes	Refs
Alegrete	RS		66	1968	Tractebel Energia		
Charqueadas	RS		72	1962–1969	Tractebel Energia		
Figueira	PR		20	1963–1974	Cia Paranaense de Energia		
Jorge Lacerda	SC		857	1965–1974, 1979–1980, 1996	Tractebel Energia		
Porto do Itaqui	MA		365	2013	MPX Energia		
Porto do Pecém	CE	03°34′58″S 38°52′30″W	1085	2012	Energia Pecém		

== Gas and oil fired ==
Station	Community	Coordinates	Operator	Capacity (MW)	Year	Notes	Refs
Campos	RJ		Furnas	30	1968		
Piratininga	SP		Empresa Metropolitana de Aguas e Energia	372	1954–1960		
Presidente Vargas	RJ		Cia Siderurgica National	230	1999		
Santa Cruz	RJ	22°54′49″S 43°46′01″W	Furnas	350	1967–1973		
Sao Goncalo	RJ		Furnas	33	1956–1961		
Sol Coke Works	ES		Sol Coqueria Tubarão	198	2007	Waste heat	

== Gas turbines ==
Station	Community	Coordinates	Operator	Capacity (MW)	Notes	Refs
Aureliano Chaves (Ibirite)	MG		Ibiritermo SA	226	2002–2003	
Barbosa Lima Sobrinho	RJ		Petrobras	384	2001	
Camacari				347	2003	
Fafen Energia (Camacari)	BA		Fafen Energia	134	2003	
Luis Carlos Prestes	MS		Petrobas	368	2002–2012	
Macae	RJ		Petrobras	920	2001–2002	
Norte Fluminense	RJ		UTE Norte Fluminense	780	2003–2004	
Parnaíba Complex	MA		Eneva	1,400	2013	
Santa Cruz Repower	RJ		Furnas	514	2008	
Termoaçu	RN		Petrobas	342	2007–2008	
Termoaraucária	PR		Cia Paranaense de Energia Eletrica	480	2002	
Termobahia	BA		Termobahia SA	190	2002	
Termofortaleza	CE		Endesa Brasil	343	2003	
Termo Norte-II	RO		Termo Norte Energia Ltda	360	2003	
Termopernambuco	PE		Guaraniana SA	500	2004	
TermoRio (Leonel Brizola)	RJ	22°42′52″S 43°15′15″W	TermoRio (Petrobras)	1,044	2004–2005	
Uruguaiana	RS		AES São Paulo	520	2000	

== Internal combustion engines ==
Station	Community	Coordinates	Operator	Capacity (MW)	Notes	Refs
Aterro Uberlândia	MG		Energas Geração de Energia Ltda	5.6		
Cristiano Rocha	AM		Rio Amazonas Energia SA	85.4		
GERA	AM		Usina Geradora de Energia do Amazonas SA	83		
Serra do Navio	AP		Amapari Energy	22.8		
Sete Lagoas	MG		Cummins Brasil	66		
Suape-II	PE		Energética Suape II SA	380		

== Nuclear ==
Station	Community	Coordinates	Capacity (MW)	Year commissioned	Operator	Refs
Almirante Álvaro Alberto Nuclear Power Plant (Angra I, II)	Itaorna Beach	23°00′28″S 44°27′32″W	2007	1985, 2001	Eletronuclear	

== Solar ==
Station	Community	Coordinates	Capacity (MW)	Operator	Refs
Lapa Solar Park	BA		158	Enel Green Power	
Ituverava Solar Park	BA		254	Enel Green Power	
Horizonte Solar Park	BA		103	Enel Green Power	
Nova Olinda Solar Park	PI		292	Enel Green Power	
Pirapora	MG		400	EDF EN	

== Wind ==
Station	Community	Coordinates	Capacity (MW)	Operator	Refs
Alto Sertão Wind Farm I	BA		386		
Alto Sertão Wind Farm II	BA		293		
Delta 3 Wind Farm	MA		220		
Osório Wind Farm	RS		150		
Trairi Wind Farm	RS		125		
Capão do Tigre Wind Farm	RS		180		
União dos Ventos Wind Farm	RN		169		
Morro dos Ventos Wind Farm	RN		145		
Agua Doce Wind Farm	SC		142		
Bons Ventos Wind Farm	CE		138		

== See also ==
- Electricity sector in Brazil
- Energy policy of Brazil
- List of power stations in South America
- List of largest power stations in the world
- Pumped-storage hydroelectricity
