= Sobradinho =

Sobradinho may refer to:

- Sobradinho, Bahia, a municipality in Bahia, Brazil
  - Sobradinho Reservoir, a reservoir located in the municipality
  - Sobradinho Dam, a hydroelectric dam damming the reservoir
- Sobradinho, Federal District, an administrative region in the Federal District of Brazil
  - Sobradinho Esporte Clube, Sobradinho's football club
- Sobradinho, Rio Grande do Sul, a municipality in Rio Grande do Sul, Brazil
