= Olho d'Água do Casado =

Municipality of Alagoas, Brazil

- Municipality
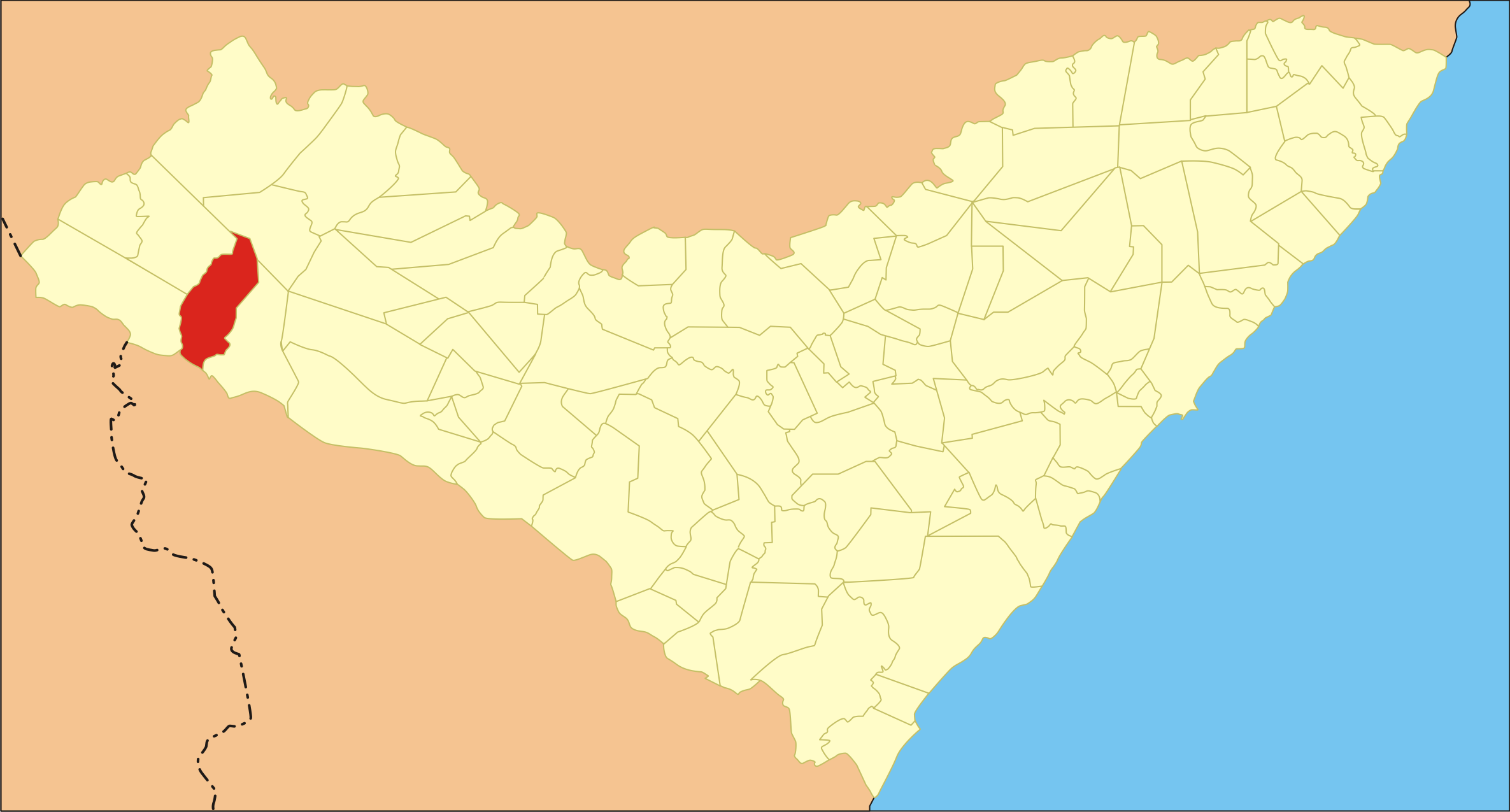
- Location of Olho d'Água do Casado in Alagoas

- Location in Brazil
- Coordinates: 9.536°S 37.294°W
- Country: Brazil
- Region: Northeast
- State: Alagoas

Area
  - Total: 323 km^{2} (125 sq mi)

Population (2020)
  - Total: 9,441
- Time zone: UTC−3 (BRT)

Olho d'Água do Casado (Central northeastern portuguese pronunciation: [ˈojʊ ˈdagwɐ ˈdʊ kɐˈzɐdu]) is a municipality located in the western of the Brazilian state of Alagoas. Its population is 9,441 (2020) and its area is 323 square kilometres (125 sq mi).

The municipality holds part of the 26,736 hectares (66,070 acres) Rio São Francisco Natural Monument, which protects the spectacular canyons of the São Francisco River between the Paulo Afonso Hydroelectric Complex and the Xingó Dam.
