= Canindé de São Francisco =

Municipality in Sergipe, Brazil

- Municipality
- The Municipality of Canindé de São Francisco
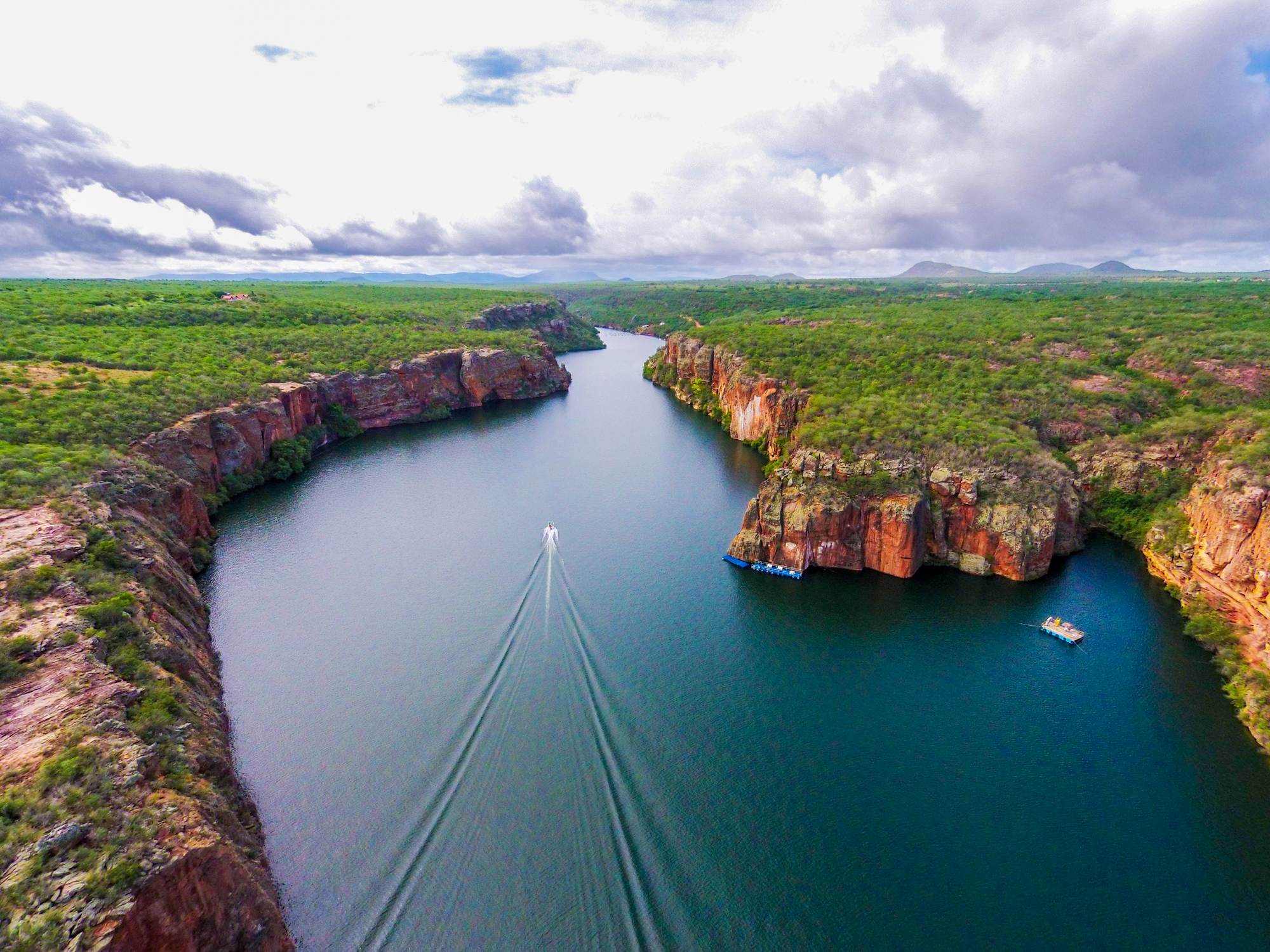
- São Francisco River in Canindé de São Francisco

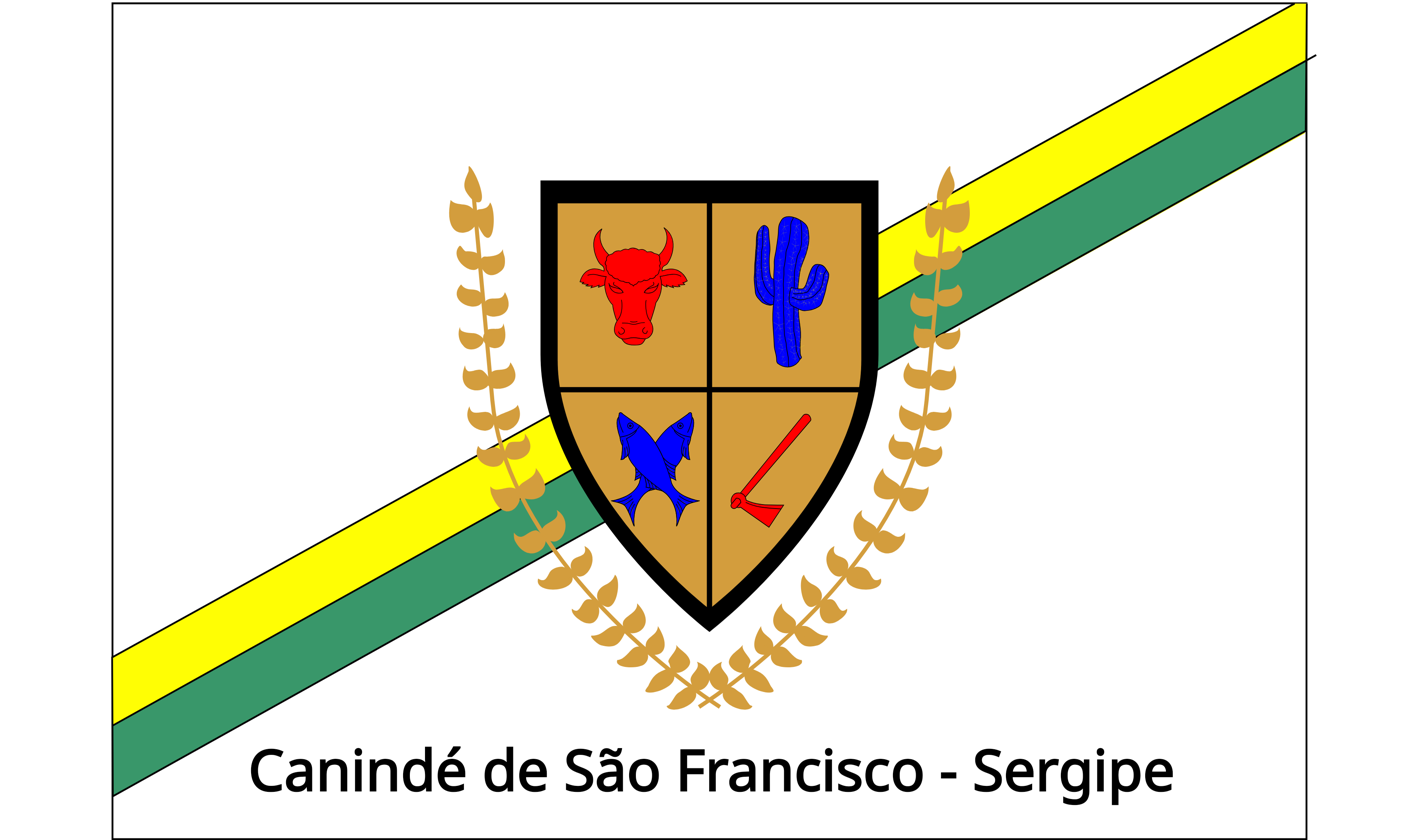
- Flag Coat of arms

- Location of Canindé de São Francisco in the State of Sergipe
- Coordinates: 09°38′31″S 37°47′16″W
- Country: Brazil
- Region: Northeast
- State: Sergipe
- Founded: 1953

Government
  - Mayor: José Heleno da Silva

Area
  - Total: 902.2 km^{2} (348.3 sq mi)
- Elevation: 68 m (223 ft)

Population (2020)
  - Total: 30,402
  - Density: 33.70/km^{2} (87.28/sq mi)
- Time zone: UTC−3 (BRT)
- HDI (2000): 0.580 – medium
- Climate: BSh

Canindé de São Francisco (Brazilian Portuguese: [kɐnĩˈdɛ dʒi ˈsɐ̃w fɾɐ̃ˈsisku]) is a municipality located in the Brazilian state of Sergipe. Its population was 30,402 (2020) and its area is 902.2 km^{2} (348.3 mi^{2}).

== Conservation ==
The municipality holds part of the 26,736 hectares (66,070 acres) Rio São Francisco Natural Monument, which protects the spectacular canyons of the São Francisco River between the Paulo Afonso Hydroelectric Complex and the Xingó Dam. The municipality also contains the 279 hectares (690 acres) Lagoa do Frio Municipal Nature Park, created in 2001.

== See also ==
- List of municipalities in Sergipe
