= Piranhas, Alagoas =

Municipality of Alagoas, Brazil

Piranhas
- Municipality
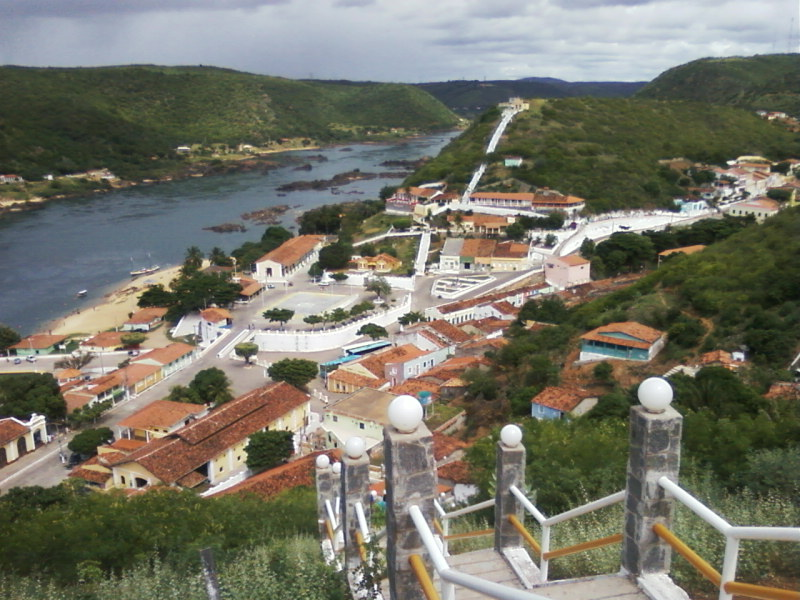
- View of the centre of Piranhas looking upstream along the Rio São Francisco. The left-most building in the photo is a small part of the former railway station building (now a museum) and platform.

- Flag Coat of arms

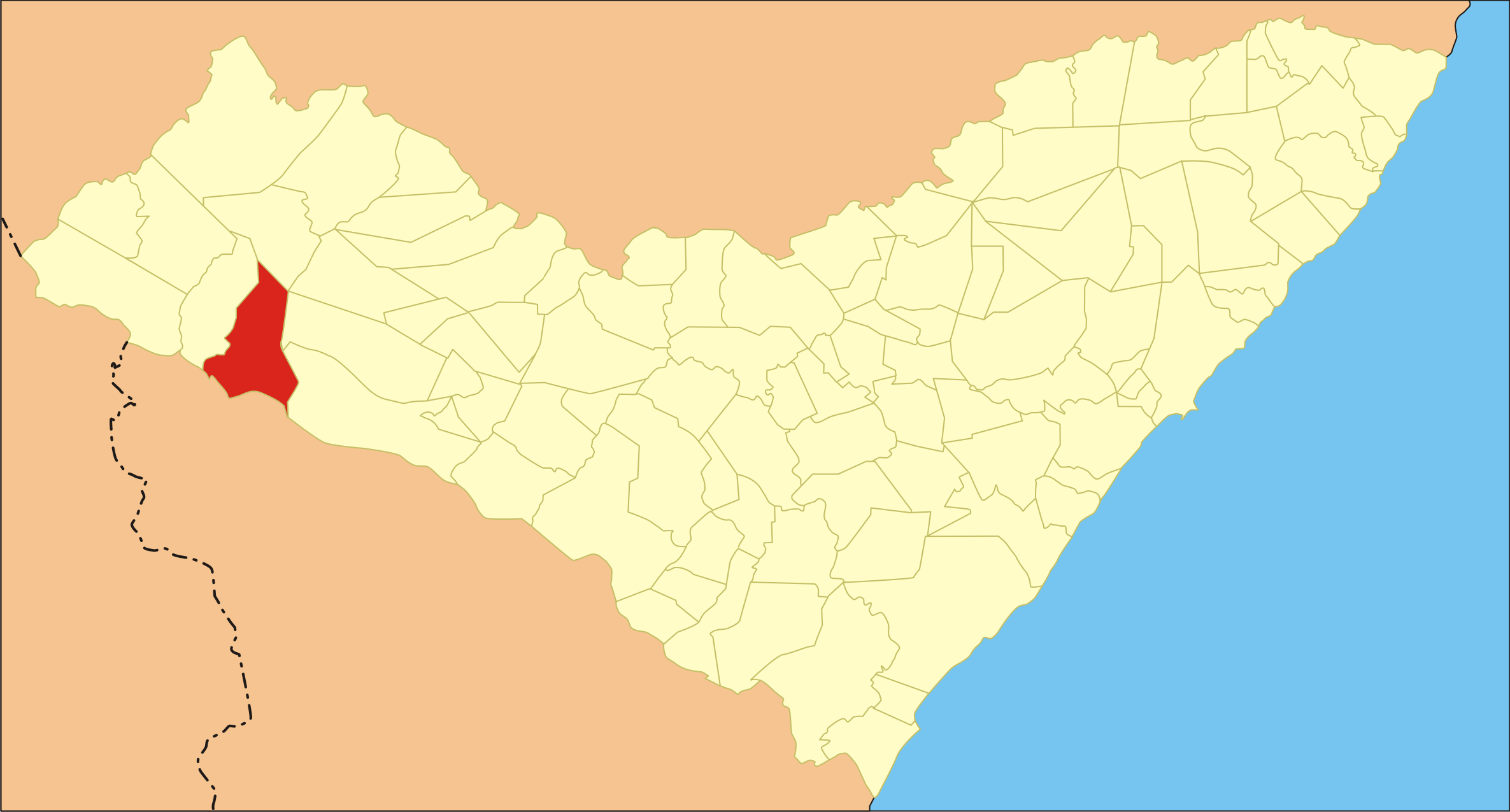
- Location of Piranhas in the State of Alagoas

- Location in Brazil
- Coordinates: 09°37′26″S 37°45′25″W
- Country: Brazil
- State: Alagoas

Population (2020)
  - Total: 25,183
- Time zone: UTC−3 (BRT)
- Website: Official website

Piranhas (Central northeastern portuguese pronunciation: [piˈɾɐ̃j̃ɐ(s)]) is a historic municipality near the western limit of the State of Alagoas, in the Northeast Region of Brazil.

Located on the banks of the São Francisco River, on the border with the State of Sergipe, Piranhas was founded in 1891 and originally named Floriano Peixoto (in honor of the Army General who was one of the founders of the Republic and was later elected President).

It was also known as Porto de Piranhas, because fishermen caught piranhas (a carnivorous predator fish) there.

== History ==
The town was founded in 1891.

Its architecture is typical of late Empire, Northeast style of constructions.

In the 1930s, Piranhas was attacked several times by the cangaceiros, bands of marauders and bandits, commanded by the infamous Lampião, who frequently hid from the police in the rocky outcrops near the city.

== Transport ==
=== Railway ===
Historically Piranhas was the upstream limit of navigation on the lower São Francisco River. Immediately upstream of Piranhas there were impassable rapids, and 60 km further upstream was the major falls at Paulo Afonso. Above those falls the São Francisco became navigable again for over 1500 km.

In 1881 Piranhas became the start of a railway line which was designed to bypass these obstacles to navigation. The line rose out of the deeply cut valley of the river and then, paralleling it at a distance of several kilometres, set off in a north-westerly direction, before rejoining it further upstream. The line passed through a series of small towns including Olho d'Água das Flores and Delmiro Gouveia, before reaching its destination at Petrolândia, on the banks of the upper São Francisco, and approximately 80 km upstream from Piranhas.

From 1881 to 1903 this railway was known as the Estrada de Ferro Paulo Afonso. After this date the line was incorporated successively in two other rail companies before closing finally in 1964. The line was never incorporated physically into any railway network, remaining a single, single track, line from beginning to end. Today the stretch of the abandoned trackbed, which climbs up the side of the valley from the centre of Piranhas, provides a walking route with views of São Francisco in the valley below and of the Xingó Dam hydroelectric installation, just upstream of the town.

=== Other transport ===
Today Piranhas can be reached by boat from several ports along the São Francisco, or by car, via a paved road from Maceió (AL-225).

== Leisure ==
The municipality holds part of the 26,736 hectares (66,070 acres) Rio São Francisco Natural Monument, which protects the canyons of the São Francisco River between the Paulo Afonso Hydroelectric Complex and the Xingó Dam.

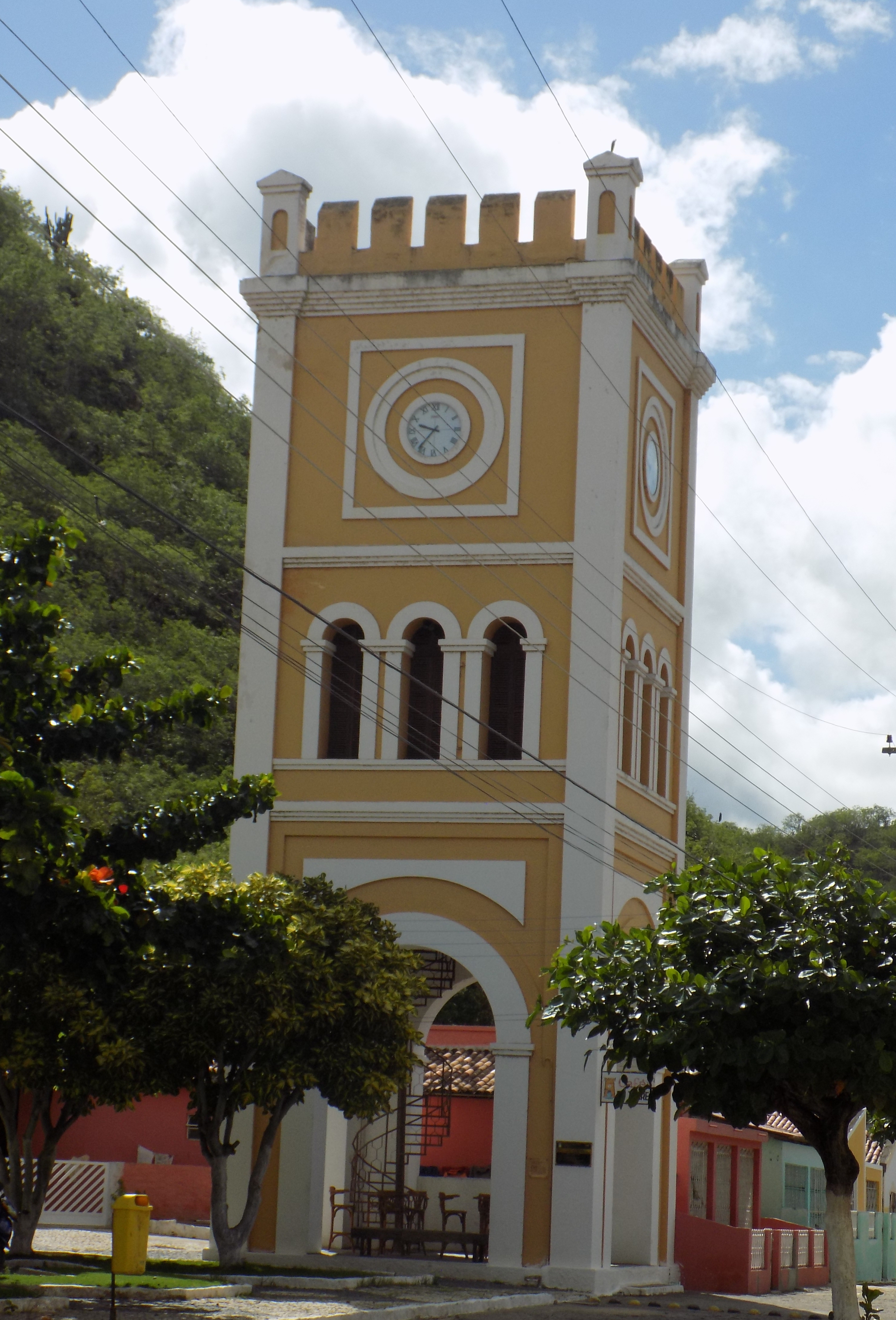
Torre do Relógio

Water sports such as catamarans, sailboats and canoes are available at river beaches and lakes, as well tours along the São Francisco using typical paddle steamers (gaiolas). Several waterfalls, the river itself, the semi-arid and rough caatinga, strange rock formations, and its river gorges are visible.

== Statistics ==
- Population: 25,183 (2020)
- Area: 407.65 km²
- Elevation: 88 m
- Distance from the capital (Maceió): 291 km
- Climate: dry and hot, average annual temperature: 28 degrees Celsius
- Economic activity: fishing, agriculture, cattle raising, ecotourism.

== Notable people ==
- Gilberto Oliveira Souza Júnior Football player
