= Paulo Afonso Falls =

Series of waterfalls on the São Francisco River in Bahia, Brazil

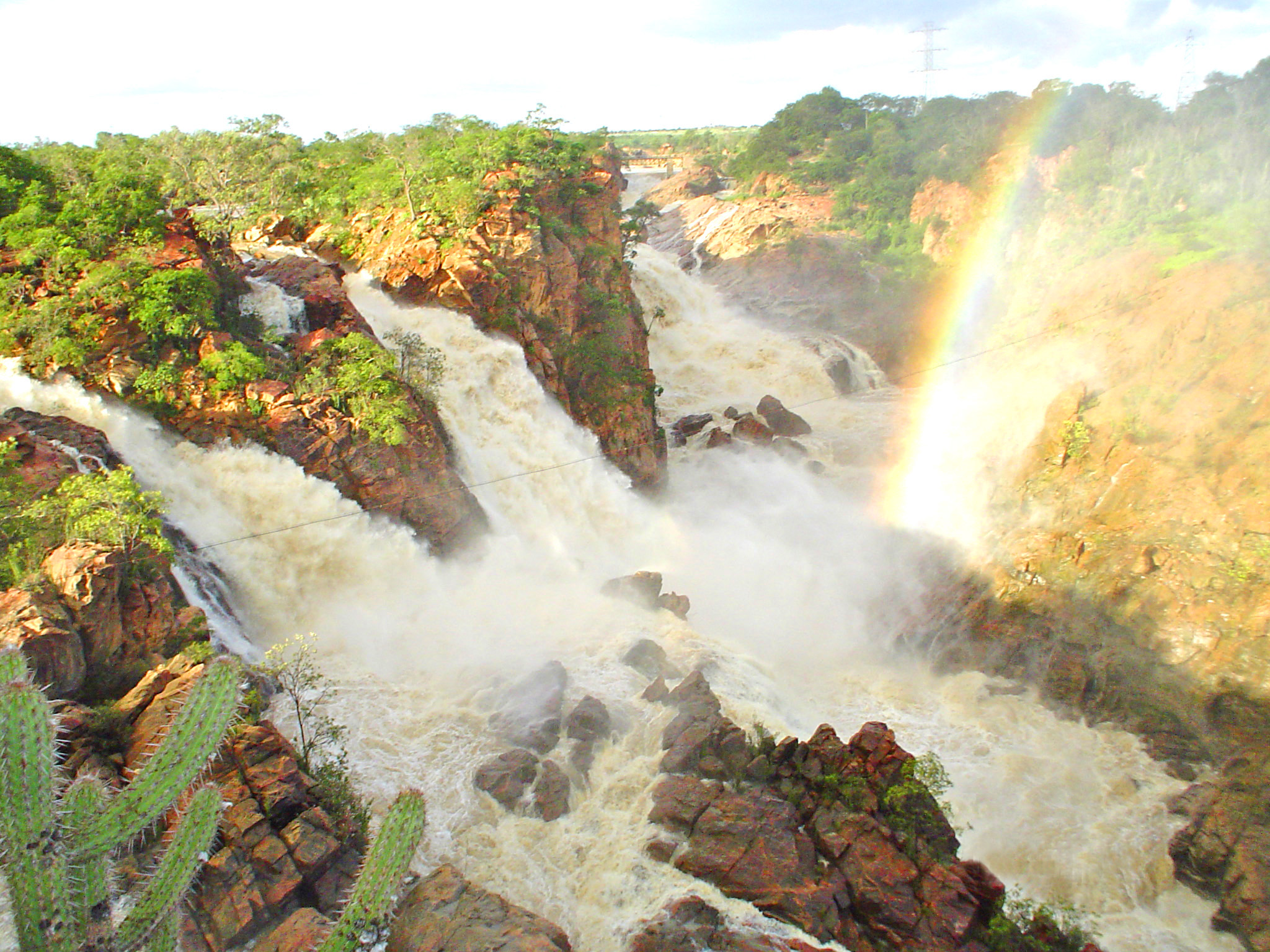
- Paulo Afonso Falls during a water release from the Paulo Afonso Hydroelectric Complex
- Interactive map of Paulo Afonso Falls
- Location: Alagoas and Bahia; Brazil
- Coordinates: 9°23′21″S 38°11′45″W
- Type: Tiered
- Total height: 84 metres (276 ft)
- Number of drops: 3
- Longest drop: 59 metres (194 ft)
- Average width: 18 metres (59 ft)
- Watercourse: São Francisco River
- Average flow rate: 2,832 m^{3}/s (100,000 cu ft/s) (historical)

Paulo Afonso Falls (Portuguese: Cachoeira de Paulo Afonso) is a series of waterfalls on the São Francisco River in the north-east of Brazil adjacent to the city of Paulo Afonso.

== Structure ==
The falls consist of a series of tiered cascades that descend approximately 24.4 metres (80 ft) before plunging 79.3 metres (260 ft) into a narrow gorge. The falls have an overall height of 84 metres (276 ft).

Prior to damming, the falls had an estimated flow rate of 2,832 m^{3}/s (100,000 cu ft/s) and a maximum flow rate of at least 14,158 m^{3}/s (500,000 cu ft/s). This would have made the falls the largest in Brazil and among the largest in the world.

== History ==
The waterfall has been known to the indigenous population of the São Francisco River basin since time immemorial and to Portuguese colonizers since the 16th century.

=== Damming ===
In 1912, the São Francisco River was dammed by the Hidrelétrica de Angiquinho upstream of the falls. The hydroelectric dam was the first hydroelectric power station in northeastern Brazil.

In the early 1940s, the Brazilian government sponsored the expansion of the Hidrelétrica de Angiquinho to provide much of the semi-arid interior with a reliable source of electricity. Construction of the Paulo Afonso Hydroelectric Complex began in 1948, which greatly reduced the volume of water flowing over the falls. Since the completion of the hydroelectric complex, the falls have acted as a natural spillway during high rainfall years.

== Gallery ==
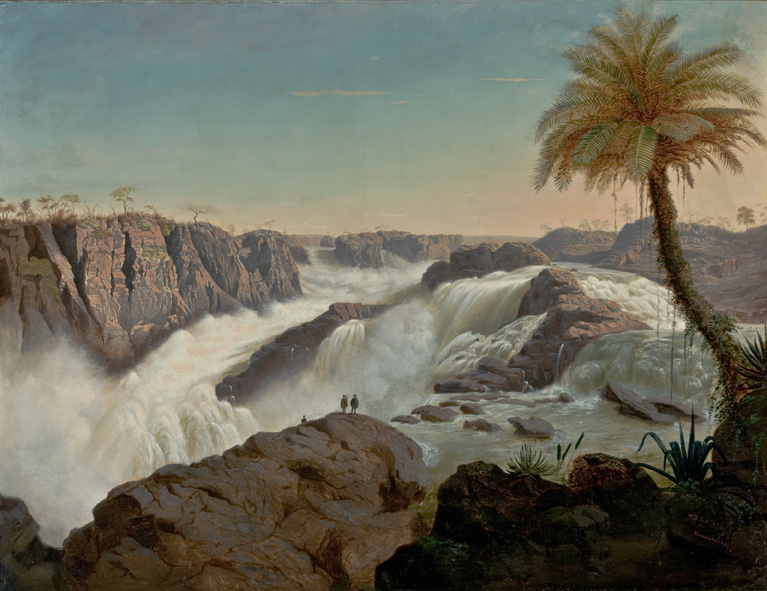
Painting of Paulo Afonso Falls by E. F. Schute, 1850

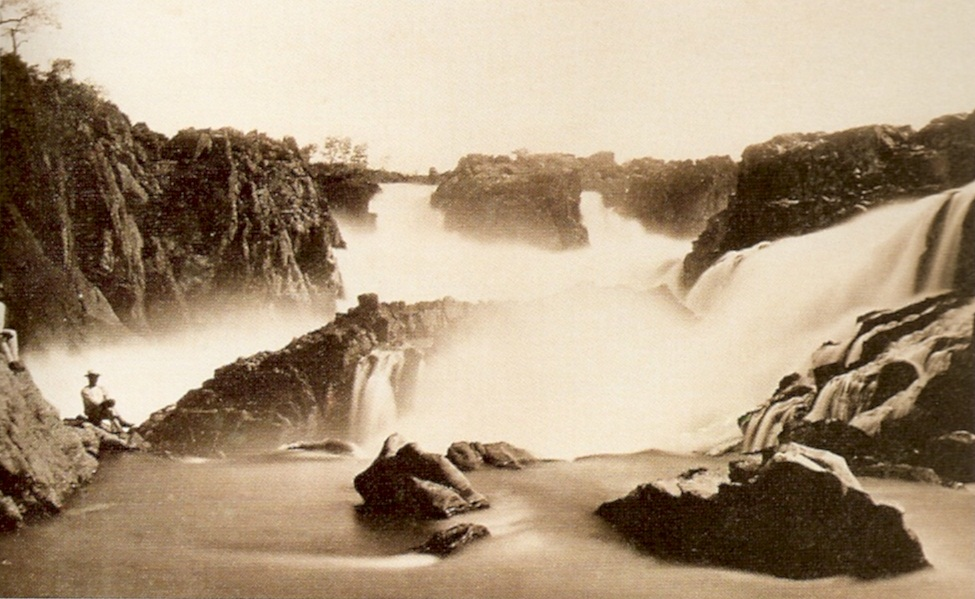
Paulo Afonso Falls, 1875

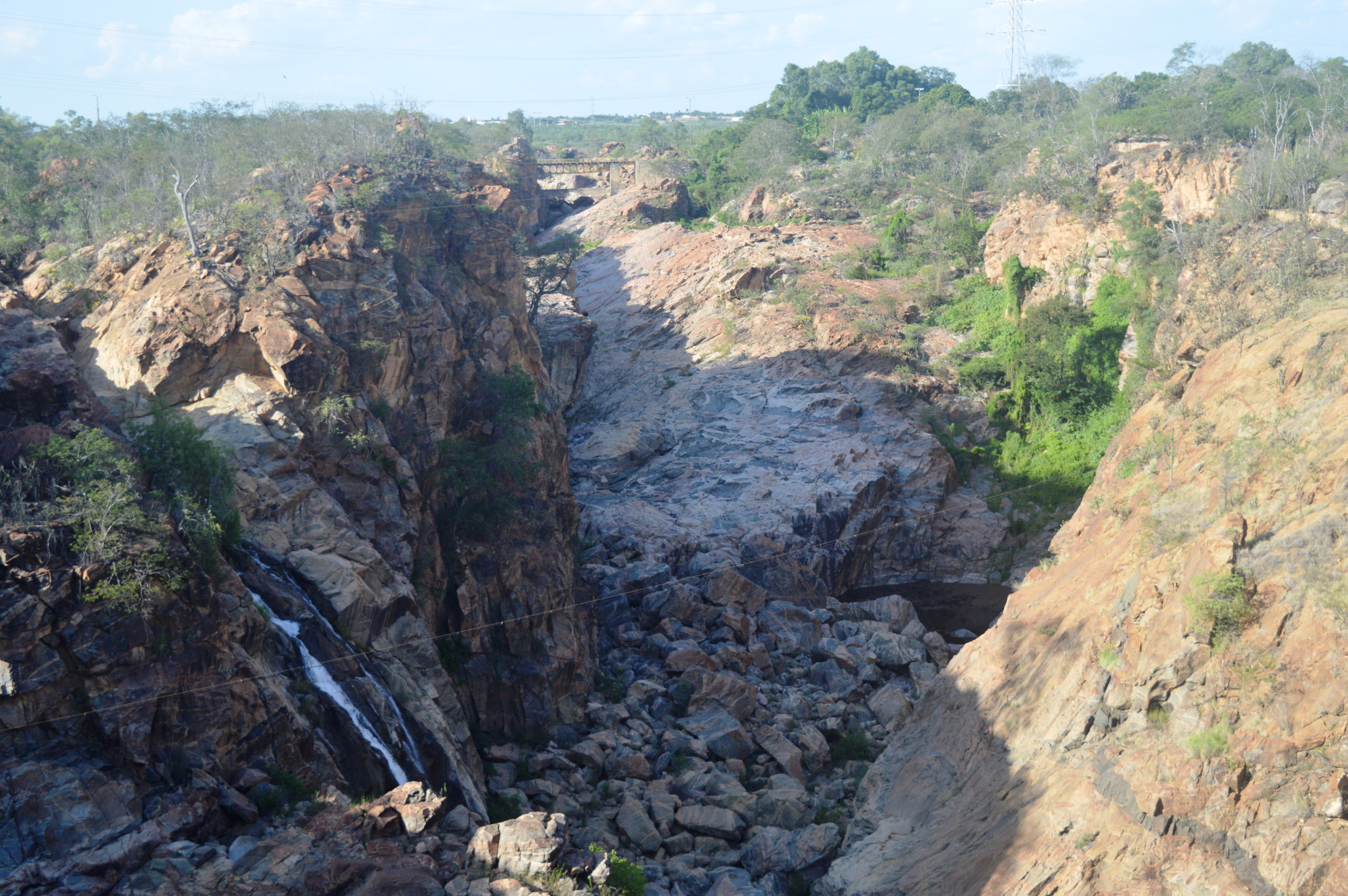
Paulo Afonso Falls, 2018

== See also ==
- List of waterfalls
- List of waterfalls by flow rate
