= Luiz Gonzaga Dam =

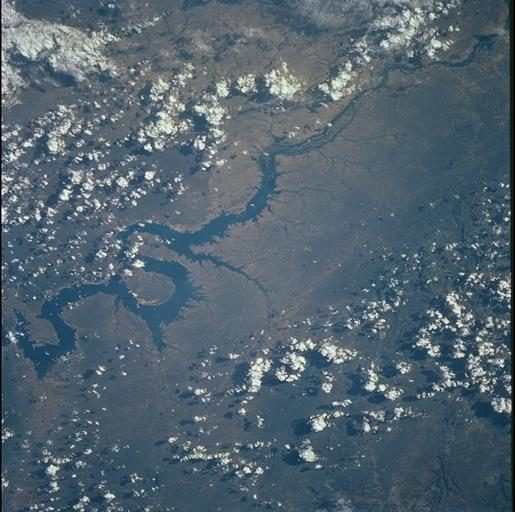
- NASA image of Luiz Gonzaga (Itaparica) Reservoir in 2001, dam at bottom left

- Location within Brazil
- Official name: Hidroelétrica de Luiz Gonzaga
- Location: Petrolândia, Pernambuco, Brazil
- Coordinates: 9°8′38″S 38°18′48″W
- Construction began: 1979
- Opening date: 1988
- Owner: CHESF

Dam and spillways
- Type of dam: Embankment, earth and rock-fill
- Impounds: São Francisco River
- Height: 105 m (344 ft)
- Length: 4,700 m (15,400 ft)
- Width (crest): 10 m (33 ft)
- Spillway type: Service, gate-controlled

Reservoir
- Creates: Luiz Gonzaga Reservoir
- Total capacity: 10.7 km^{3} (8,700,000 acre⋅ft)
- Catchment area: 630,000 km^{2} (240,000 sq mi)
- Surface area: 830 km^{2} (320 sq mi)

Power Station
- Commission date: 1988-1990
- Turbines: 6 x 246.6 MW (330,700 hp) Francis turbines
- Installed capacity: 1,479 MW (1,983,000 hp) MW

The Luiz Gonzaga Dam, formerly known as the Itaparica Dam, is a rock-fill embankment dam on the São Francisco River 25 kilometres (16 mi) downstream of Petrolândia in Pernambuco, Brazil. The dam was built for navigation, and hydroelectric power generation as it supports a 1,479 megawatts (1,983,000 hp) power station. It was constructed between 1979 and 1988; the last of its generators was commissioned in 1990.

The dam is owned and operated by CHESF and was renamed in honor of Luiz Gonzaga, known as the "king of Baião" and "Gonzagão"

== Dam ==
The Luiz Gonzaga Dam is a 4,700-metre (15,400 ft) long and 105-metre (344 ft) high rock and earth-fill embankment dam. The contains a 720-metre (2,360 ft) concrete section that supports the power plants and spillway of which contains nine floodgates. The maximum level of the reservoir is 305.4 metres (1,002 ft) above sea level while the dam reaches a maximum height of 308.1 metres (1,011 ft).

== Power plant ==
The dam supports a 310-metre (1,020 ft) long and 54.6-metre (179 ft) wide hydroelectric power station. The station contains six SíncronoVertical Francis turbines within generators that have an installed capacity of 246.6 megawatts (330,700 hp) each, totaling 1,479 MW. The first generator was commissioned on June 13, 1988, another later that year, three more were commissioned in 1989 and the final generator went online on February 13, 1990. Three of the generators were manufactured by Gie and the other three along with three of the turbines by Siemens. Voith manufactured the three remaining turbines.

== Involuntary relocation controversy ==
Before construction on the dam began in July 1979, the involuntary relocation of 40,000 people - 10,000 from urban and 30,000 from rural areas, mostly indigenous Tuxá - from the future reservoir area began. Those being relocated protested the dam and formed Polosindical because of farmland loss, subsequent unemployment and hunger along with previous relocation difficulties associated with the upstream Sobradinho Dam in the 1970s. In 1986, CHESF, the builders of the dam, agreed to construct irrigation facilities. The World Bank had described CHESF's relocation plan as flawed and financed a $500 million resettlement program if certain criteria were met. The World Bank estimates that each family will cost $60,000 and the construction of irrigation facilities is slowly progressing.

== See also ==
- List of power stations in Brazil
