= Urucé =

The Urucé people were Gê-speaking natives of the São Francisco riverbanks around the current city of Sento Sé in the Brazilian state of Bahia. They are now extinct as a tribe.

These Amerindians where first mentioned by Belchior Dias, the first bandeirante to reach the region of current Sobradinho in 1593 in search of silver. During his journey, he met the Galache in Remanso, the Kariri in Juazeiro, the Massacará in Salitre, the Tamoquim in Sobradinho and the Urucé in Sento Sé.

Most of the natives of that region were Christianized and assimilated to different degrees by the Portuguese colonists. According to some descendants, the Urucés were a fierce tribe that often engaged in conflicts with their close neighbors, the Centucé. The toponym Sento Sé is a phonetical derivation of the tribe name Centucé.

The Urucé left a few ancient rock paintings often representing a stylized symbol of water springs, as the surrounding caatinga is a very dry biotop, as a way to help their members to localize sources of water.
