= Sento Sé =

Sento Sé Município de Sento Sé
- Municipality
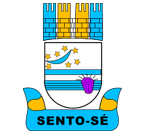
- Flag Coat of arms

- Location of Sento Sé in Bahia

- Location of Sento Sé in Brazil
- Coordinates: 09°44′45″S 41°53′06″W
- Country: Brazil
- Region: Northeast
- State: Bahia
- Founded: 1832

Government
  - Mayor: Giselda Carvalho (2025-2028) (PT)

Area
  - Total: 11,980.172 km^{2} (4,625.570 sq mi)

Population (2022)
  - Total: 38,154
  - Density: 3.1848/km^{2} (8.2485/sq mi)
- Demonym: Sentoseense
- Time zone: UTC-3 (BRT)
- Website: www.sentose.ba.gov.br

Sento Sé is a municipality in the state of Bahia in the North-East region of Brazil. It covers 12,698.76 km^{2} (4,903.02 mi^{2}), and has a population of 40,989 with a population density of 1.28 inhabitants per square kilometer. Sento Sé is located 689 kilometres (428 mi) from the state capital of Salvador.

Sento Sé has a peculiar history. It is among the five cities that had to be flooded because of construction of the Sobradinho Dam. The new Sento Sé erected in 1974, was being gradually populated by residents of the former headquarters, which plunged into the waters.

== History ==
The name Sento Sé comes from an ancestral indigenous tribe called Centoce. The first foreign settlers were Portuguese sugar cane producers that built mills in that area. The foundation of the municipality was in 1832 by a provincial decree.

In the 1970s, the city passed for one of the most complicated moments. The construction of Sobradinho Dam obligated the moving of the city and another little communities close to the river to another place 62 kilometers away, in 1974.

Sento-Sé is known for containing amethyst and iron ore within its territory. Amethyst is found near the Boqueirão da Onça National Park, and iron ore is found near the APL area.

Sento-Sé includes natural places. Among these places, one that has gained much fame is Ilha do Mocó, in the district of Américo Alves, a village in Quixaba.

== See also ==
- List of municipalities in Bahia
- Loja Maçônica Deus Harmonia e Amor nº 149
- Urucé
