= Delmiro Gouveia =

Municipality of Alagoas, Brazil

- Municipality
- The Municipality of Delmiro Gouveia
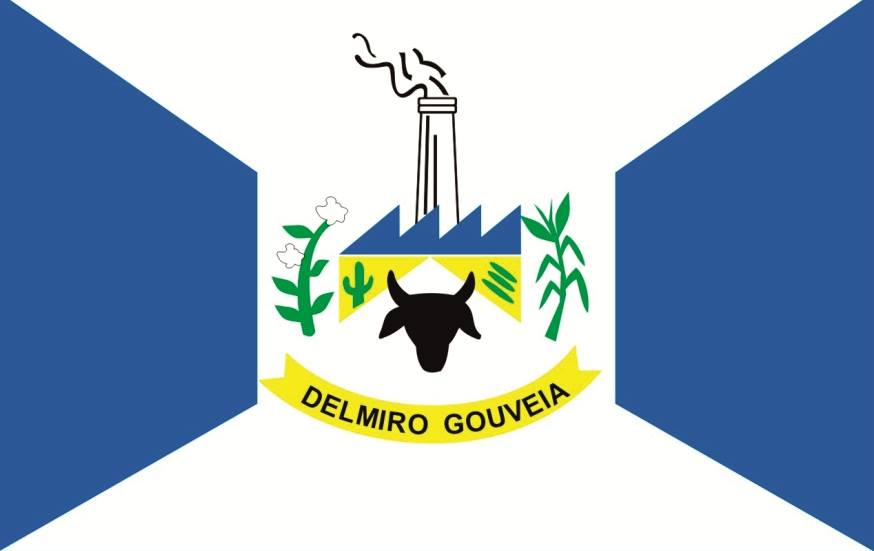
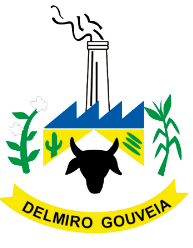
- Flag Coat of arms
- Nickname: Del 1000 (in Portuguese pronounced Del mil [Del thousand])
- Location of Delmiro Gouveia in the State of Alagoas

- Location in Brazil
- Coordinates: 09°23′09″S 37°59′45″W
- Country: Brazil
- Region: Northeast
- State: Alagoas
- Founded: 1952

Government
  - Mayor: Luiz Carlos Costa(Lula Cabeleira)

Area
  - Total: 609.7 km^{2} (235.4 sq mi)
- Elevation: 256 m (840 ft)

Population (2020)
  - Total: 52,262
  - Density: 67.4/km^{2} (175/sq mi)
- Time zone: UTC−3 (BRT)
- HDI (2000): 0.645 – medium
- Website: www.delmirogouveia.al.gov.br

Delmiro Gouveia (Central northeastern portuguese pronunciation: [dewˈmiɾu go(ʊ)ˈveɐ]) is a municipality located in the westernmost point of the Brazilian state of Alagoas. Its population is 52,262 (2020) and its area is 609 km^{2}.

The municipality holds part of the 26,736 hectares (66,070 acres) Rio São Francisco Natural Monument, which protects the spectacular canyons of the São Francisco River between the Paulo Afonso Hydroelectric Complex and the Xingó Dam.
