= Vítor (footballer, born 1982) =

Brazilian footballer

Personal information
- Full name: Cícero Vítor dos Santos Júnior
- Date of birth: 29 July 1982 (age 44)
- Place of birth: Delmiro Gouveia, Brazil
- Height: 1.72 m (5 ft 8 in)
- Position: Right-back

Team information
- Current team: Aparecida FC

Youth career
- 2001–2002: CRAC

Senior career*
Years	Team	Apps	(Gls)
2002–2005	CRAC	42	(6)
2006–2010	Goiás	136	(12)
2010–2013	Palmeiras	27	(0)
2011	→ Sport (loan)	0	(0)
2011	→ Cruzeiro (loan)	21	(0)
2012–2013	→ Goiás (loan)	65	(5)
2014	Goiás	5	(0)
2014–2015	Sport	9	(0)
2015–2018	Santa Cruz	53	(4)
2019	Goiânia	0	(0)
2019–	Aparecida FC		
- * Club domestic league appearances and goals as of 23:02, 26 December 2019 (UTC)

Cícero Vítor dos Santos Júnior (born 29 July 1982 in Delmiro Gouveia), or simply Vítor, is a Brazilian professional footballer who plays for Aparecida Esporte Clube as a right-back.

== Honours ==
Goiás

- Goiás State League: 2004, 2006, 2012, 2013
- Campeonato Brasileiro Série B: 2012

Individual

- Bola de Prata: 2008
