= Lagoa do Frio Municipal Nature Park =

Municipal nature park in Sergipe, Brazil

- Parque Natural Municipal Lagoa do Frio
- Location within Brazil
- Nearest city: Canindé de São Francisco, Sergipe.
- Coordinates: 9°40′33″S 37°59′52″W
- Area: 278.99 hectares (689.4 acres)
- Designation: Municipal nature park
- Created: 23 October 2001

The Lagoa do Frio Municipal Nature Park (Portuguese: Parque Natural Municipal Lagoa do Frio) is a municipal nature park in the state of Sergipe, Brazil.

== Location ==
The Lagoa do Frio Municipal Nature Park is in the municipality of Canindé de São Francisco, Sergipe. It has an area of 278.99 hectares (689.4 acres). The park is in the extreme northwest of the state, near the border with Bahia. It is one of three conservation units in the caatinga biome, the others being the Grota do Angico Natural Monument and the Rio São Francisco Natural Monument. Operated at the municipal level, the park has not created any agreement for cooperation in developing studies. Little has been written about the park other than a study of fragmentation of the caatinga biome.

== History ==
The Lagoa do Frio Municipal Nature Park was created by decree 41 of 23 October 2001. The park became part of the Caatinga Ecological Corridor, created in May 2006. As of 2013 there was no management plan.

== Sources ==
- Cruz SilvaI, Ana Cecília da; Nascimento PrataI, Ana Paula do; SoutoI, Leandro Sousa; Aparecida de Mello, Anabel (May–June 2013), "Aspectos de ecologia de paisagem e ameaças à biodiversidade em uma unidade de conservação na Caatinga, em Sergipe" (PDF), Revista Árvore, 37 (3), Viçosa: 479–490, doi:10.1590/S0100-67622013000300011, ISSN 1806-9088
- Dórea Battesini, Marcela; Alves dos Santos, Carla Zoaid; Melo Neto, José de Oliveira; Gomes, Laura Jane (January 2013), "Publicações acadêmicas das unidades de conservação no estado de Sergipe, Brasil" (PDF), Interciencia, 38 (1), Caracas, Venezuela: Asociación Interciencia, ISSN 0378-1844
- Ganem, Roseli Senna (2016), "Gestão integrada da biodiversidade: corredores, mosaicos e reservas da biosfera" (PDF), Conservação da Biodiversidade Legislação e Políticas Públicas (in Portuguese), archived from the original (PDF) on 2016-11-04
- Lagoa do Frio (in Portuguese), CNIP
- Silva, M. S. F.; Souza, R. M. (2009), "O potencial fitogeográfico de Sergipe: uma abordagem a partir das unidades de conservação de uso sustentável", Scientia Plena (in Portuguese), 5 (10)
