= Rio São Francisco Natural Monument =

Natural monument in Brazil

- Monumento Natural do Rio São Francisco
- IUCN category III (natural monument or feature)
- Location within Brazil
- Nearest city: Canindé de São Francisco, Sergipe
- Coordinates: 9°30′53″S 38°00′12″W
- Area: 26,736 hectares (66,070 acres)
- Designation: Natural monument
- Created: 5 June 2009
- Administrator: ICMBio

The Rio São Francisco Natural Monument (Portuguese: Monumento Natural do Rio São Francisco) is a natural monument in the states of Alagoas, Bahia and Sergipe, Brazil. It protects a section of dramatic canyons on the São Francisco River and the surrounding caatinga environment, while supporting tourism and ecotourism.

== Location ==
The Rio São Francisco Natural Monument is in the Caatinga biome. It has an area of 26,736 hectares (66,070 acres). The conservation unit extends along both sides of the São Francisco River from the bridge between Alagoas and Bahia just below the Paulo Afonso Hydroelectric Complex to a little north of the Xingó Dam above Canindé de São Francisco. It is in parts of the municipalities of Delmiro Gouveia, Olho d'Água do Casado and Piranhas in Alagoas, Paulo Afonso in Bahia and Canindé de São Francisco in Sergipe.

The area for the natural monument is semi-arid, with typical caatinga vegetation, and subject to desertification. It has sandstone formations more than a billion years old, which have their own flora and endemic species. These include the endangered blue-winged macaw (Primolius maracana) and a newly reported skink of the Mabuya genus.

== Conservation ==
The Rio São Francisco Natural Monument was created by decree on 5 June 2009 and is administered by the federal Chico Mendes Institute for Biodiversity Conservation. It is classed as IUCN protected area category III (natural monument or feature). The purpose is to preserve a natural ecosystem of great ecological relevance and scenic beauty, enabling scientific research and environmental education, recreation in contact with nature and ecological tourism.

The monument protects the canyons of the São Francisco River, the reservoir of the Xingó dam and the rock sites of the Malhada Grande / Rio do Sal complex in Paulo Afonso. The monument did not expropriate land, and was expected to strengthen sustainable tourism and ecotourism. Mining is allowed in the buffer zone. Sustainable fishing and low impact agriculture can continue in areas where these activities were practised in the past, subject to the conservation unit's management plan. Freedom of navigation in the river is maintained, also subject to the management plan. Tourism has become a major local industry. Tourists may take boat rides through the river's magnificent canyons.

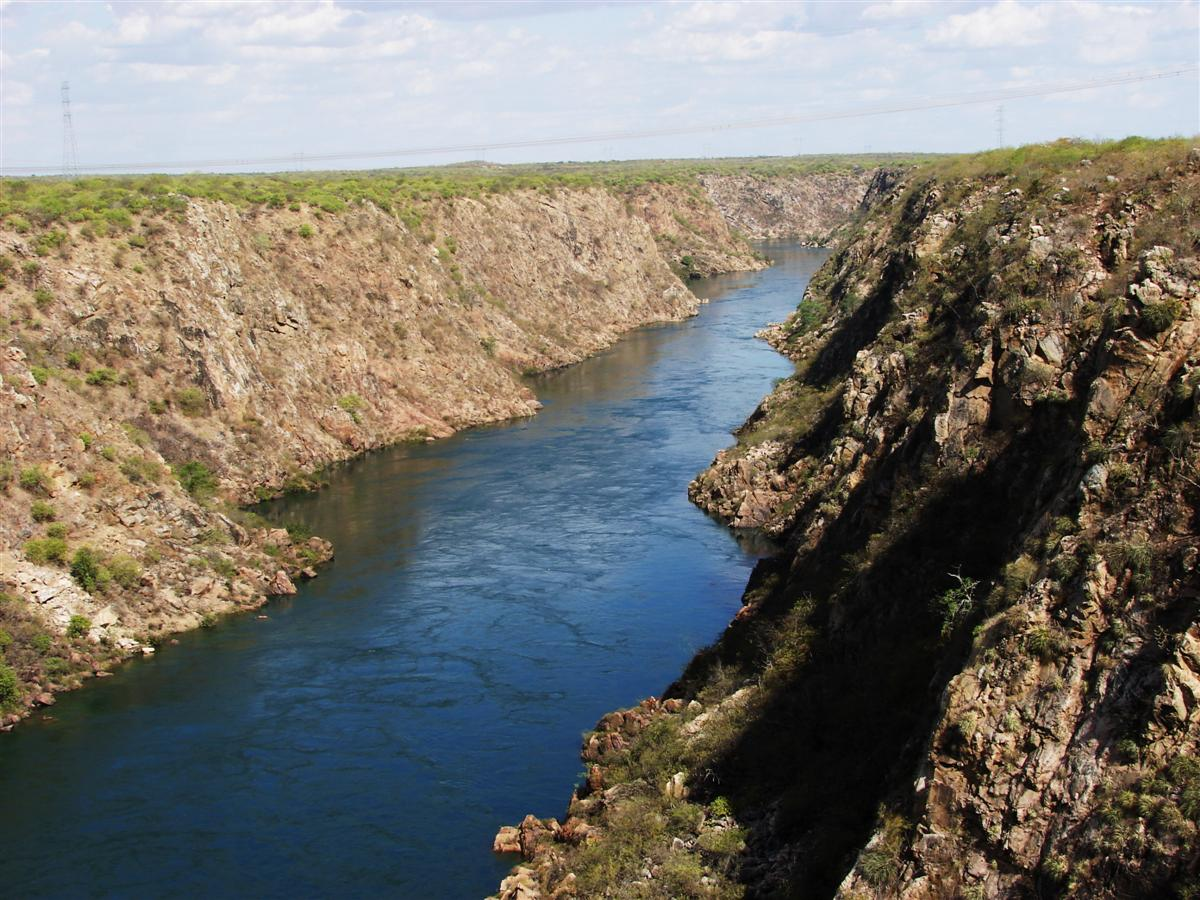
Near Paulo Afonso

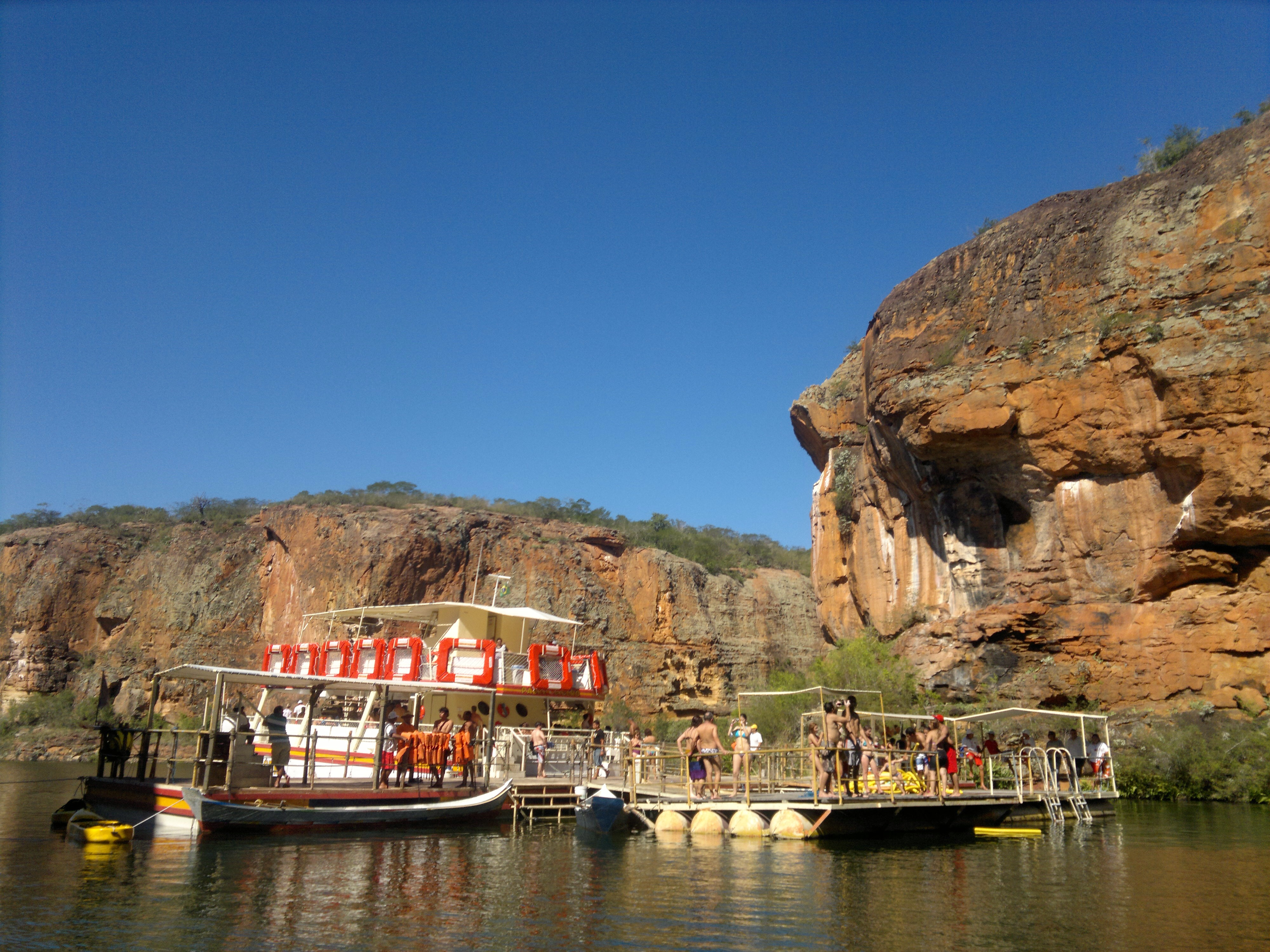
Xingo canyon tour boat

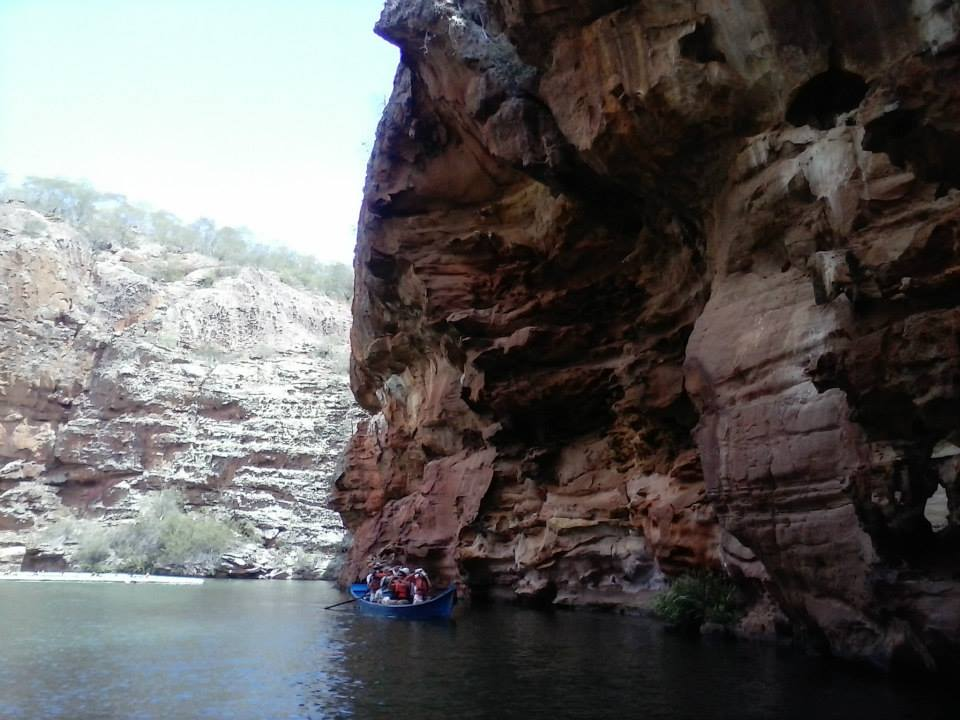
Boat in Xingo canyon

== Sources ==
- Lucia Leão (9 June 2008), Monumento Natural do São Francisco protegerá área de Caatinga (in Portuguese), Ministry of the Environment (Brazil)
- Luiz Inácio Lula da Silva (5 June 2009), Decreto de 5 de Junho de 2009 (in Portuguese), Presidência da República, Casa Civil, Subchefia para Assuntos Jurídicos
- Mapa Interativo (in Portuguese), ICMBio
- Mona do Rio São Francisco (in Portuguese), Fundação Joaquim Nabuco
- Monumento Natural do Rio São Francisco (in Portuguese), Chico Mendes Institute for Biodiversity Conservation
- O monumento natural do São Francisco (in Portuguese), CBHSF: Comitê da Bacia Hidrográfica do Rio São Francisco
- Unidade de Conservação: Monumento Natural do Rio São Francisco (in Portuguese), MMA: Ministério do Meio Ambiente
