= Paulo Afonso =

Municipality of Bahia, Brazil

- Municipality
- The Municipality of Paulo Afonso
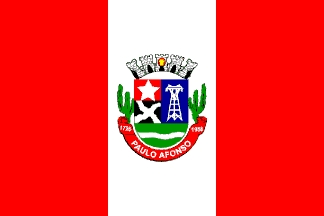
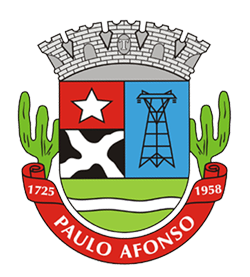
- Flag Coat of arms

- Location in Bahia

- Location of Paulo Afonso
- Coordinates: 9°24′00″S 38°13′30″W
- Country: Brazil
- Region: Northeast
- State: Bahia
- Founded: 1958

Government
  - Mayor: Luiz de Deus (PSD)

Area
  - Total: 1,545.192 km^{2} (596.602 sq mi)
- Elevation: 243 m (797 ft)

Population (2022 Census)
  - Total: 112,870
  - Estimate (2025): 119,418
  - Density: 73.046/km^{2} (189.19/sq mi)
- Time zone: UTC−3 (BRT)
- HDI (2010): 0.674 – medium

Paulo Afonso is a city in Bahia, Brazil. It was founded in 1958.

The city is the seat of the Roman Catholic Diocese of Paulo Afonso. The city is served by Paulo Afonso Airport.

The municipality contains part of the Raso da Catarina ecoregion. The municipality holds part of the 26,736 hectares (66,070 acres) Rio São Francisco Natural Monument, which protects the spectacular canyons of the São Francisco River between the Paulo Afonso Hydroelectric Complex and the Xingó Dam. It contains part of the 104,842 hectares (259,070 acres) Raso da Catarina Ecological Station, created in 2001.

== Climate ==
Paulo Afonso experiences a hot semi-arid climate (BSh) under the Koppen climate classification system.

Climate data for Paulo Afonso (1981–2010)
Month	Jan	Feb	Mar	Apr	May	Jun	Jul	Aug	Sep	Oct	Nov	Dec	Year
Mean daily maximum °C (°F)	34.4 (93.9)	34.3 (93.7)	33.7 (92.7)	32.5 (90.5)	30.7 (87.3)	28.5 (83.3)	27.9 (82.2)	29.1 (84.4)	31.7 (89.1)	33.8 (92.8)	34.8 (94.6)	34.6 (94.3)	32.2 (90.0)
Daily mean °C (°F)	28.0 (82.4)	28.0 (82.4)	27.8 (82.0)	26.9 (80.4)	25.5 (77.9)	23.7 (74.7)	22.9 (73.2)	23.3 (73.9)	25.1 (77.2)	26.8 (80.2)	27.8 (82.0)	28.0 (82.4)	26.2 (79.2)
Mean daily minimum °C (°F)	23.1 (73.6)	23.2 (73.8)	23.2 (73.8)	22.8 (73.0)	21.9 (71.4)	20.5 (68.9)	19.5 (67.1)	19.4 (66.9)	20.3 (68.5)	21.6 (70.9)	22.5 (72.5)	22.8 (73.0)	21.7 (71.1)
Average precipitation mm (inches)	49.2 (1.94)	38.3 (1.51)	76.8 (3.02)	75.3 (2.96)	54.2 (2.13)	62.6 (2.46)	49.3 (1.94)	29.0 (1.14)	11.7 (0.46)	17.1 (0.67)	19.5 (0.77)	30.0 (1.18)	513.0 (20.20)
Average precipitation days (≥ 1.0 mm)	3	3	6	6	9	11	10	8	3	2	2	3	66
Average relative humidity (%)	58.7	59.6	63.2	67.7	73.4	78.7	77.7	72.7	63.6	58.9	56.1	57.1	65.6
Mean monthly sunshine hours	256.0	232.2	236.3	222.6	195.3	151.5	167.9	194.0	236.6	271.7	273.7	267.0	2,704.8
Source: Instituto Nacional de Meteorologia

== See also ==
- List of municipalities in Bahia
