= Sobradinho Reservoir =

Reservoir in Bahia, Brazil

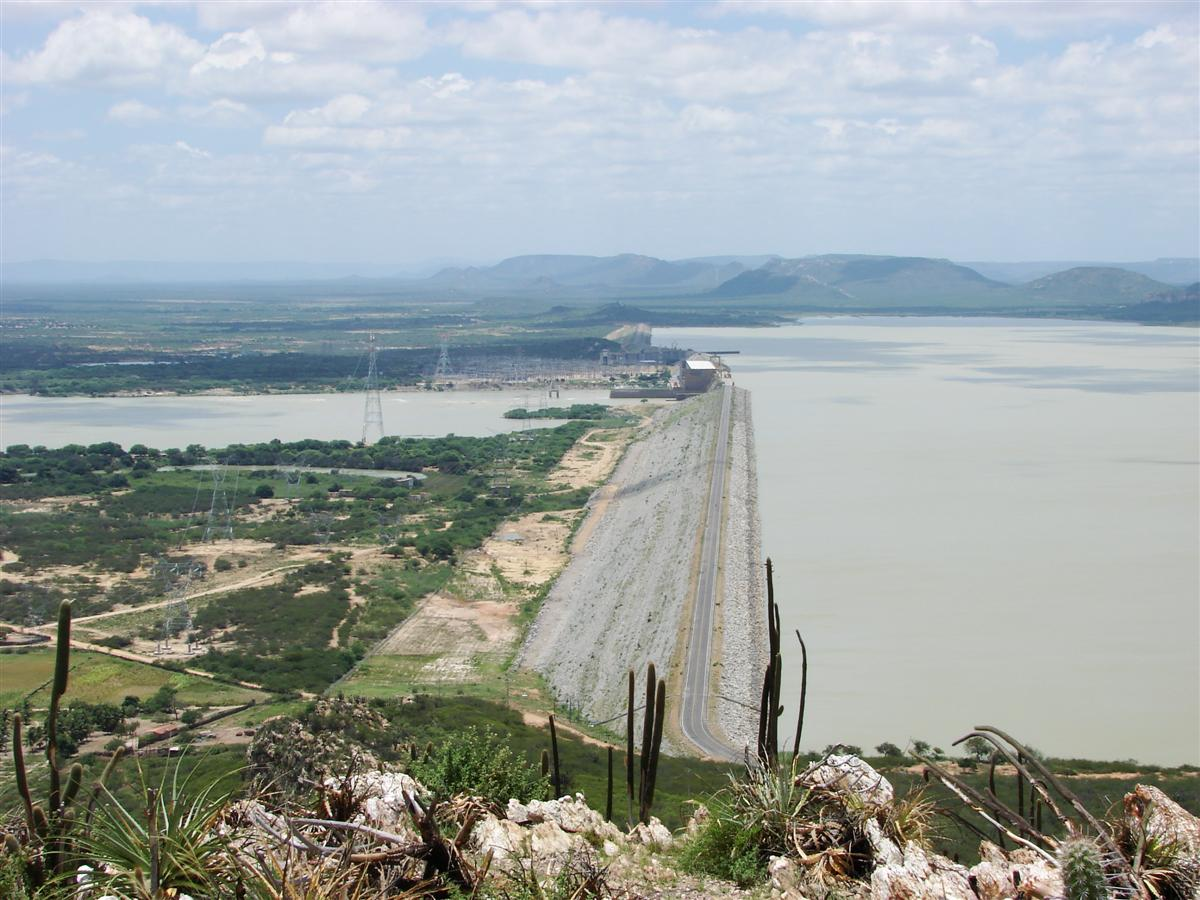

- Location within Brazil
- Interactive map of Sobradinho Reservoir
- Location: Sobradinho, Brazil
- Coordinates: 09°22′00″S 40°54′00″W
- Primary inflows: São Francisco River
- Primary outflows: São Francisco River
- Catchment area: 498,425 km^{2} (192,443 mi^{2})
- Basin countries: Brazil
- First flooded: 1982
- Surface area: 4,214 km^{2} (1,627 mi^{2})
- Average depth: 8.6 m (28.2 ft)
- Max. depth: 30 m (98 ft)
- Water volume: 34,100,000,000 m^{3} (1.20×10^{12} ft^{3})
- Residence time: 0.35 years
- Surface elevation: 392.5 m (1,287.7 ft)

The Sobradinho Reservoir (Portuguese: Lago de Sobradinho) is a large reservoir located in Sobradinho, north of the Brazilian state of Bahia. The reservoir measures approximately 320 km (200 mi) long, 4,214 km^{2} (1,627 mi^{2}) in surface area, and a storage capacity of 34.1 km^{3} (8.2 mi^{3}) at its nominal elevation of 392.5 m (1,287.7 ft), making it the 15th largest reservoir (artificial lake) in the world. The lake encloses the waters of the São Francisco River, one of the largest and most important rivers in Brazil.

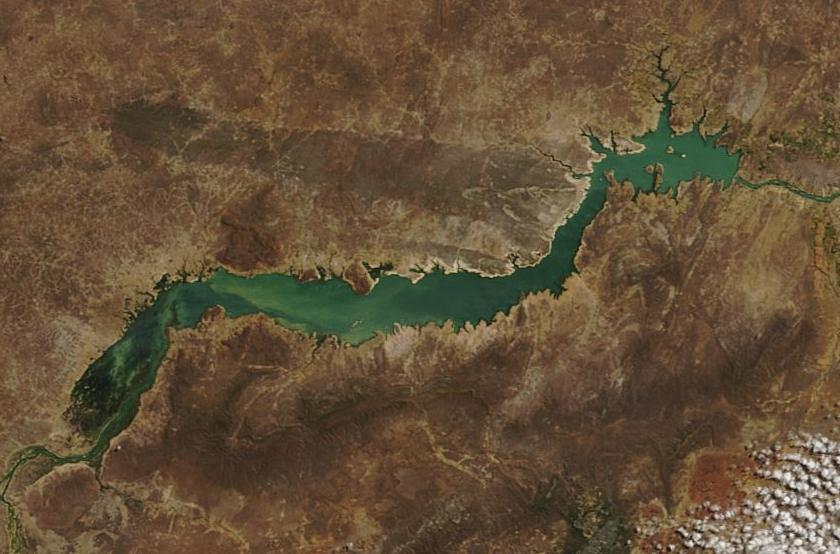
A Satellite picture of Sobradinho Reservoir in August 2018.

The reservoir, which represents 60.4% of the hydroelectric power resources of the Northeast of Brazil, has conditions to guarantee the power supply for the region for two years but its water level is highly variable. In some drought years the energy supply is threatened.
