= Sobradinho, Bahia =

Municipality in the state of Bahia, in Brazil

Sobradinho Município de Sobradinho
- Municipality
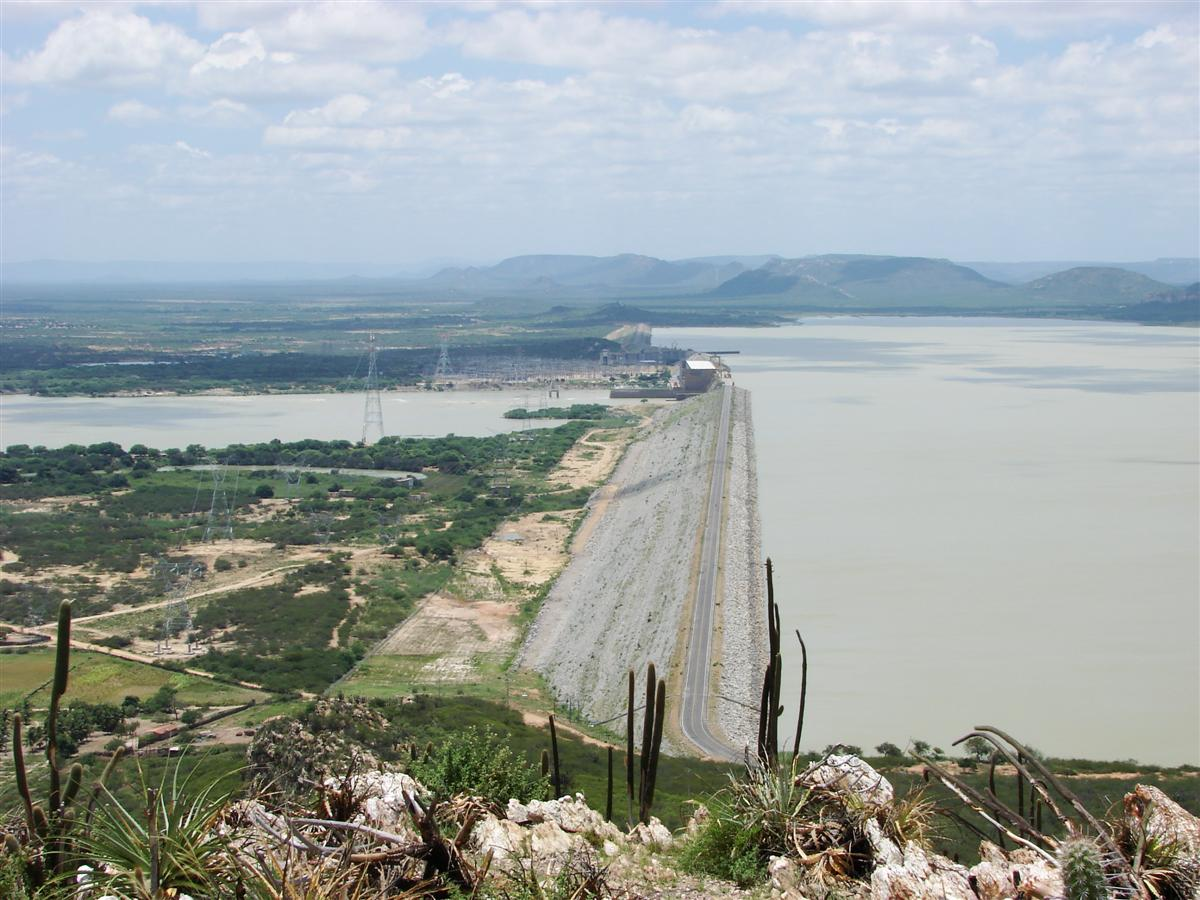
- Sobradinho Dam

- Flag Coat of arms

- Location of Sobradinho in Bahia

- Location of Sobradinho in Brazil
- Coordinates: 09°27′18″S 40°49′22″W
- Country: Brazil
- Region: Northeast
- State: Bahia
- Founded: February 24, 1989

Government
  - Mayor: Luiz Vicente Berti Torres Sanjuan (PDT, 2013-2016)

Area
  - Total: 1,238.9 km^{2} (478.3 sq mi)
- Elevation: 380 m (1,250 ft)

Population (2020)
  - Total: 23,233
  - Density: 18.753/km^{2} (48.570/sq mi)
- Demonym: Sobradinhense
- Time zone: UTC−3 (BRT)
- Website: sobradinho.ba.gov.br

Sobradinho (Portuguese pronunciation: [subɾɐˈdʒĩɲu]) is a municipality in the state of Bahia, in Brazil. It has a population of approximately 23,233 with a land area of 1,238.9 km^{2} (478.3 mi^{2}). Once part of the municipality of Juazeiro it grew with the construction of the Sobradinho Dam and the flooding of the huge Sobradinho Reservoir. With the creation of the reservoir, the inhabitants of four cities and thirty villages had to leave their homes. In all 11,853 families (more than 70 thousand people) abandoned the old towns before the end of 1977. Of this total, 5,806 families remained in rural lots around the lake and 3,851 families moved to the new towns, including Sobradinho.

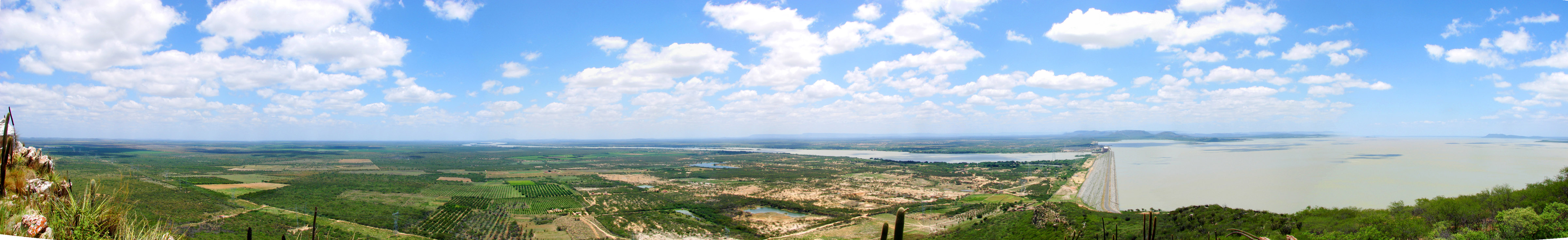
Panorama of the city of Sobradinho, the Sobradinho Dam, and the Sobradinho Reservoir.

== See also ==
- List of power stations in Brazil
