= Sobradinho Dam =

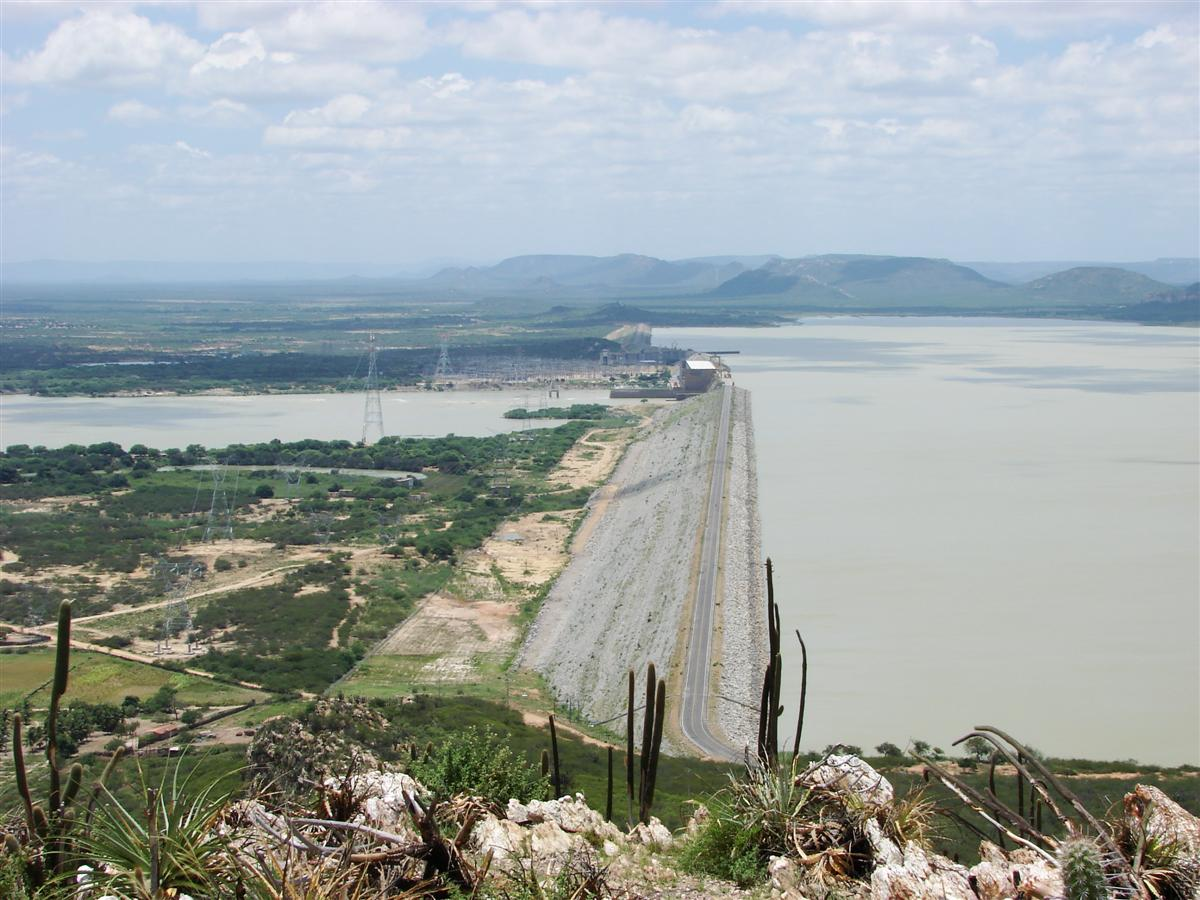

- Location within Brazil
- Location: Bahia, Brazil
- Coordinates: 09°25′54″S 40°49′40″W
- Construction began: 1973
- Opening date: 1979
- Operator: Cia Hidroeletrica do Sao Francisco

Dam and spillways
- Impounds: São Francisco River
- Height: 41 m (135 ft)
- Length: 12.5 km (7.8 mi)

Reservoir
- Creates: Sobradinho Reservoir
- Total capacity: 34,100×10^{6} m^{3} (27,600,000 acre⋅ft)
- Catchment area: 498,425 km^{2} (192,443 sq mi)
- Surface area: 4,220 km^{2} (1,630 sq mi)
- Maximum water depth: 30 m (98 ft)

Power Station
- Commission date: 1979-1982
- Turbines: 6 × 175 MW (235,000 hp) Francis-type
- Installed capacity: 1,050 MW (1,410,000 hp)

The Sobradinho Dam is a large hydroelectric dam built on the São Francisco River in Sobradinho, in the state of Bahia of Brazil. Completed in 1982, the dam generates power by utilizing six 175 megawatts (235,000 hp) Francis turbine-generators, totalling the installed capacity to 1,050 megawatts (1,410,000 hp).

== See also ==
- List of hydroelectric power stations in Brazil
- List of conventional hydroelectric power stations
