= Xingó Dam =

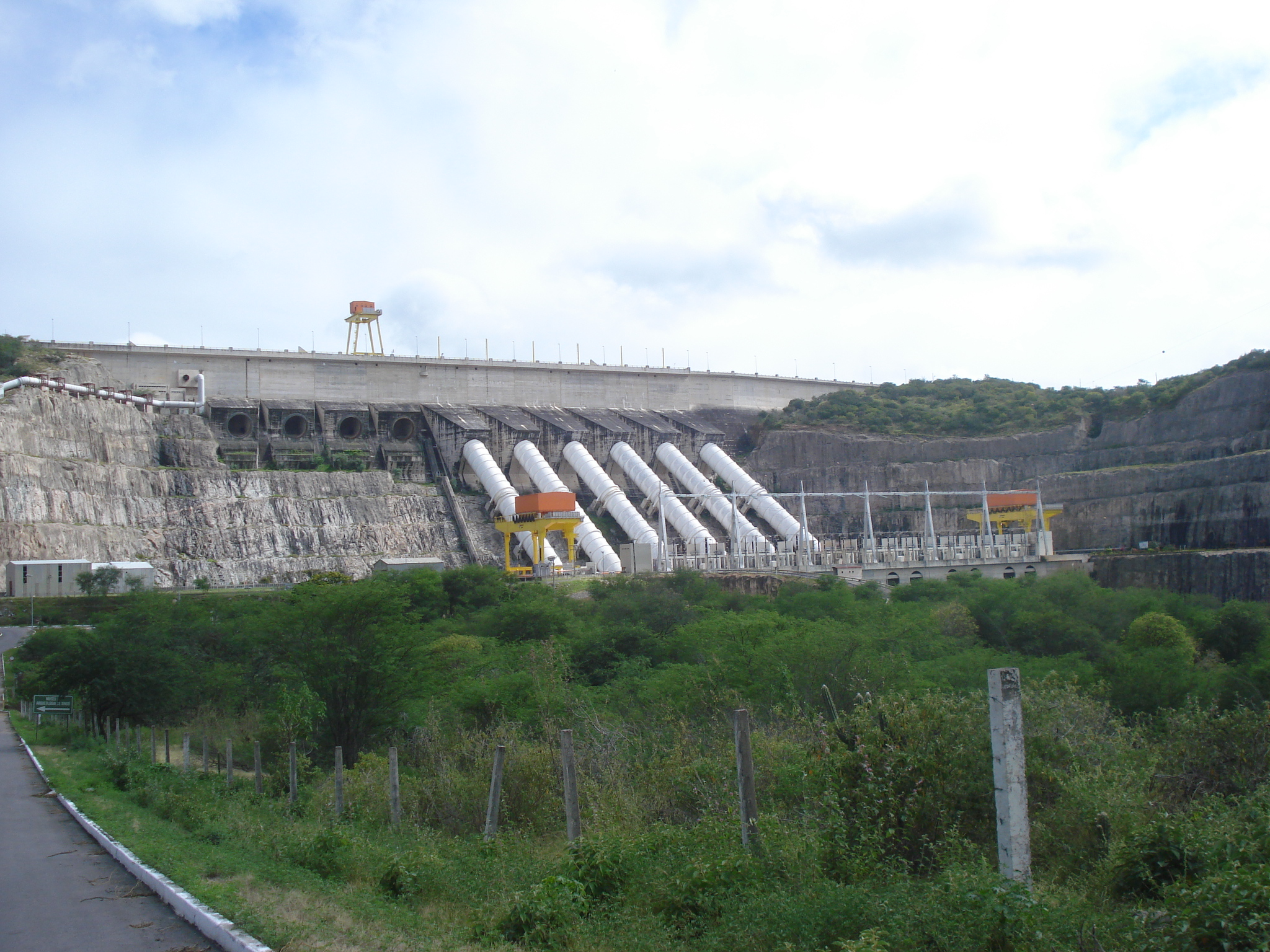

- Location within Brazil
- Official name: Hidroelétrica de Xingó
- Location: Near Piranhas on border of Alagoas and Sergipe, Brazil
- Coordinates: 9°37′14″S 37°47′34″W
- Construction began: 1987
- Opening date: 1994
- Owner: CHESF

Dam and spillways
- Type of dam: Concrete face, rock-fill
- Impounds: São Francisco River
- Height: 140 m (460 ft)
- Length: 830 m (2,720 ft)
- Dam volume: 12,900,000 m^{3} (16,900,000 cu yd)
- Spillway type: Service, gate-controlled
- Spillway capacity: 33,000 m^{3}/s (1,200,000 cu ft/s)

Reservoir
- Creates: Xingó Reservoir
- Total capacity: 3.8 km^{3} (3,100,000 acre⋅ft)
- Catchment area: 630,000 km^{2} (240,000 sq mi)
- Surface area: 60 km^{2} (23 sq mi)

Power Station
- Commission date: 1994-1997
- Turbines: 6 x 527 MW (707,000 hp) Francis turbines
- Installed capacity: 3,162 MW (4,240,000 hp) MW

The Xingó Dam is a concrete face rock-fill dam on the São Francisco River on the border of Alagoas and Sergipe, near Piranhas, Brazil. The dam was built for navigation, water supply and hydroelectric power generation as it supports a 3,162 megawatts (4,240,000 hp) power station. It was constructed between 1987 and 1994 and the last of its generators was commissioned in 1997. In Portuguese, the dam is called the Usina Hidrelétrica de Xingó.

== Construction ==
Studies for the Xingó Dam were done in the 1950s and contracts for construction were not awarded until 1982. Construction on the dam began in March 1987 but stopped in September 1988 because a debt crisis stalled funding. Construction commenced again in 1990 and by 1994, the dam was complete. On June 10, 1994, the dam began to impound the river as its reservoir began to fill. On November 15 of that year, the reservoir reached its maximum level of 130 metres (430 ft). The power station's first generator was commissioned in December 1994, the next two in 1995, two more in 1996 and the final generator in August 1997.

== Dam ==
The Xingó is a 830-metre (2,720 ft) long and 140-metre (460 ft) high concrete face rock-fill dam. It contains five zones of 12,900,000 cubic metres (460,000,000 cu ft) of fill, mostly granite. Four saddles dams (dikes) are also used to support the reservoir. Directly northeast of the dam is its spillway with 12 floodgates and a maximum capacity of 33,000 cubic metres per second (1,200,000 cu ft/s). The dam supports a reservoir with a 3.8 cubic kilometres (3,100,000 acre⋅ft) capacity, surface area of 60 square kilometres (23 sq mi) and catchment area of 630,000 square kilometres (240,000 sq mi). Part of the reservoir and the canyons upstream to the Paulo Afonso Hydroelectric Complex are protected by the 26,736 hectares (66,070 acres) Rio São Francisco Natural Monument.

== Power plant ==
The Xingó Dam's power station is directly southwest of the dam and is 240.75 metres (789.9 ft) long, 59 m (194 ft) high and 27 metres (89 ft) wide. It was designed by Promon and contains 6 x 527 megawatts (707,000 hp) Francis turbines that were manufactured by Siemens. The plant also is designed to accommodate another four identical generators that if installed would bring its installed capacity to 5,270 megawatts (7,070,000 hp).

== See also ==
- Energy policy of Brazil
- List of power stations in Brazil
