= São Francisco River =

River in Brazil

São Francisco River Velho Chico
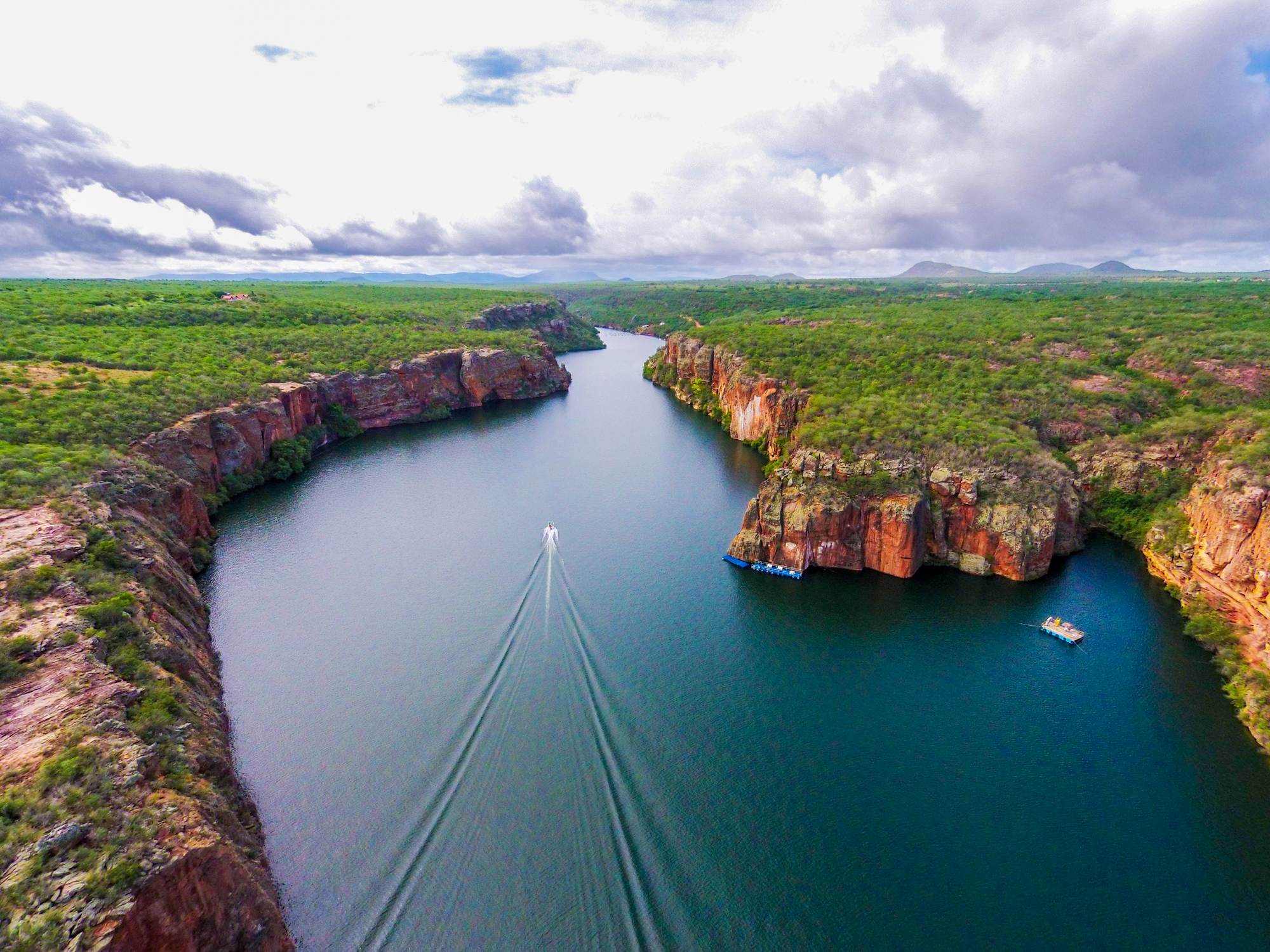

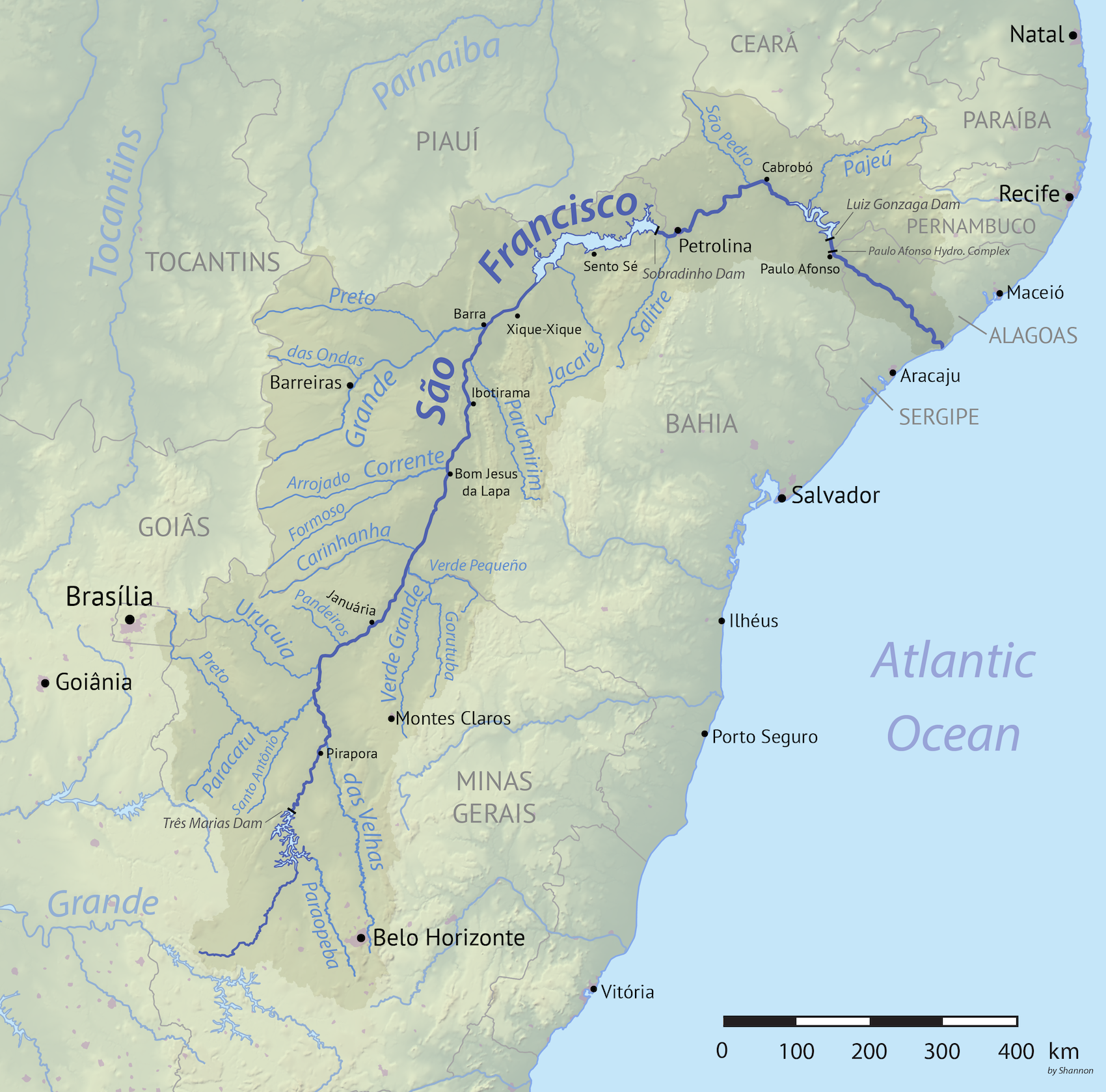
- São Francisco river basin
- Native name: Rio São Francisco (Portuguese)

Location
- Country: Brazil
- States: Minas Gerais, Bahia, Pernambuco, Alagoas, Sergipe
- Region: South America

Physical characteristics
- Source: Canastra Mountains
  - location: São Roque de Minas, Minas Gerais
  - coordinates: 20°13′49″S 46°26′35″W
  - elevation: 1,450 m (4,760 ft)
- Mouth: Atlantic Ocean
  - location: near Piaçabuçu, Alagoas / Sergipe border
  - coordinates: 10°29′59″S 36°23′44″W
  - elevation: 0 m (0 ft)
- Length: 2,830 km (1,760 mi)
- Basin size: 641,000 km^{2} (247,000 sq mi)
- Discharge
  - average: 2,943 m^{3}/s (103,900 cu ft/s)
  - minimum: 1,480 m^{3}/s (52,000 cu ft/s)
  - maximum: 11,718 m^{3}/s (413,800 cu ft/s)

The São Francisco River (Portuguese: Rio São Francisco, pronounced [ˈʁiu sɐ̃w fɾɐ̃ˈsisku]), known in English as the San Francisco River, is a large river in Brazil. With a length of 2,914 kilometres (1,811 mi), it is the longest river that runs entirely in Brazilian territory, and the fourth longest in South America and overall in Brazil (after the Amazon, the Paraná and the Madeira). It is also locally known as the Velho Chico (pronounced [ˈvɛʎu ˈʃiku]; lit. 'Old Chico', i.e., 'Old Frank'), and was once known as the Opara by the Indigenous people before colonization.

The São Francisco originates in the Canastra mountain range in the central-western part of the state of Minas Gerais. It runs generally north in the states of Minas Gerais and Bahia, behind the coastal range, draining an area of over 630,000 square kilometres (240,000 sq mi), before turning east to form the border between Bahia on the right bank and the states of Pernambuco and Alagoas on the left one. After that, it ends on the boundaries between the states of Alagoas and Sergipe and washes into the Atlantic Ocean. In addition to the five states which the São Francisco directly traverses or borders, its drainage basin also includes tributaries from the state of Goiás and the Federal District.

It is an important river for Brazil, called "the river of national integration" because it unites diverse climates and regions of the country, in particular the Southeast with the Northeast. It is also significant because it passes through the semi-arid region of the country, a region historically characterized by droughts and low access to water. It is navigable between the cities of Pirapora (Minas Gerais) and Juazeiro (Bahia), as well as between Piranhas (Alagoas) and the mouth on the ocean, but traditional passenger navigation has almost disappeared in recent years due to changes in the river flow (see below).

== Names ==
The river is named for Saint Francis of Assisi, from its first discovery by Europeans on his feast day (4 October) in 1501. The nickname "Velho Chico" may be translated as "Old Frank": velho means old, and chico is a diminutive of Francisco, itself the Portuguese form of the name Francis.

Indigenous peoples called it Kaleshí in the now extinct Tuxá language, and Opára in the extinct Natú language.

== History ==
Tuxá, Truká, Natú, Kariri languages, eastern Maxakalían languages, Jê languages, and various unclassified extinct languages were spoken in the São Francisco River basin.

The Italian explorer Amerigo Vespucci first saw the river on 4 October 1501. In 1865 the British explorer and diplomat Richard Francis Burton was transferred to Santos in Brazil. He explored the central highlands, canoeing down the São Francisco river from its source to the falls of Paulo Afonso.

== Sections ==
River source

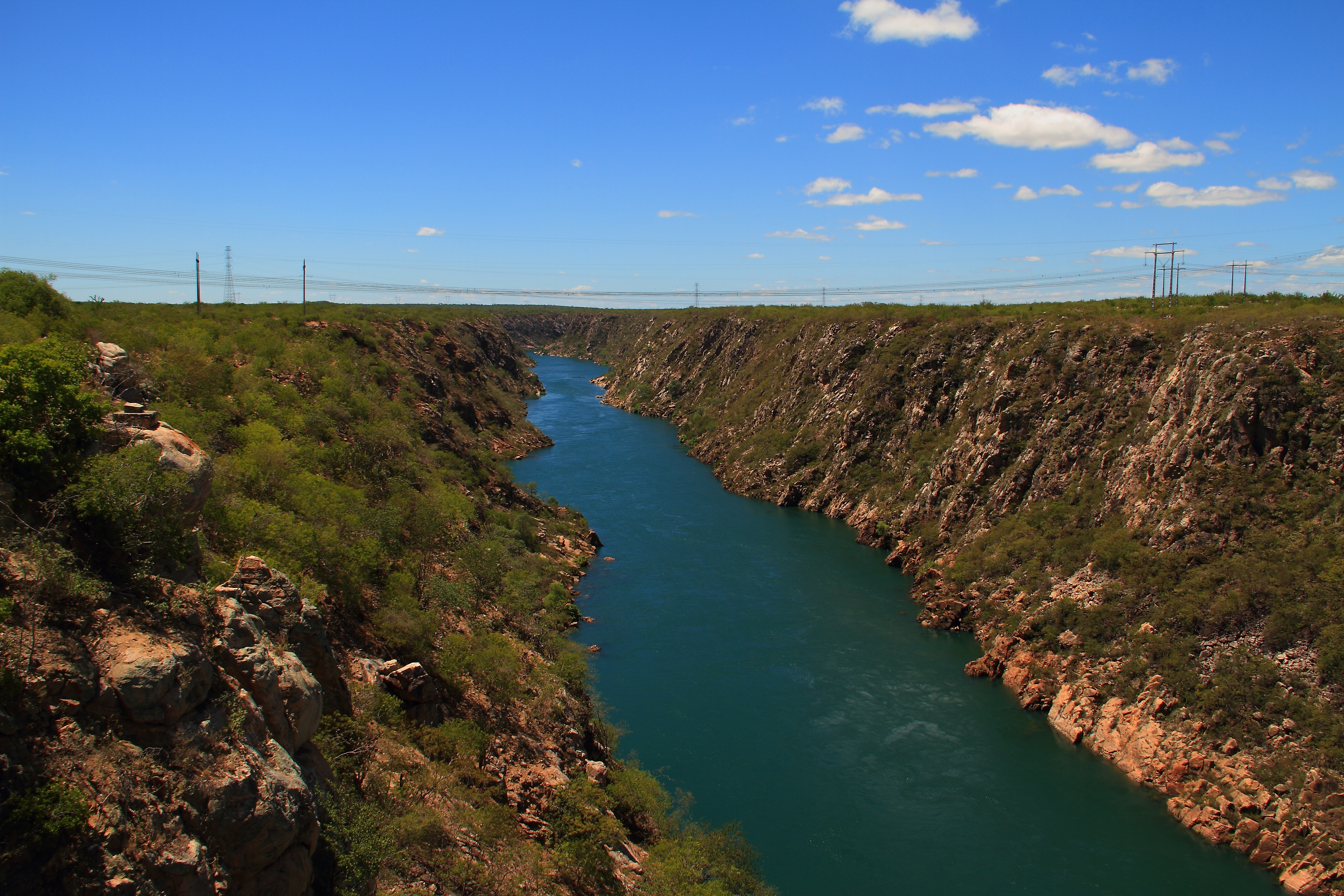
São Francisco River south of Paulo Afonso

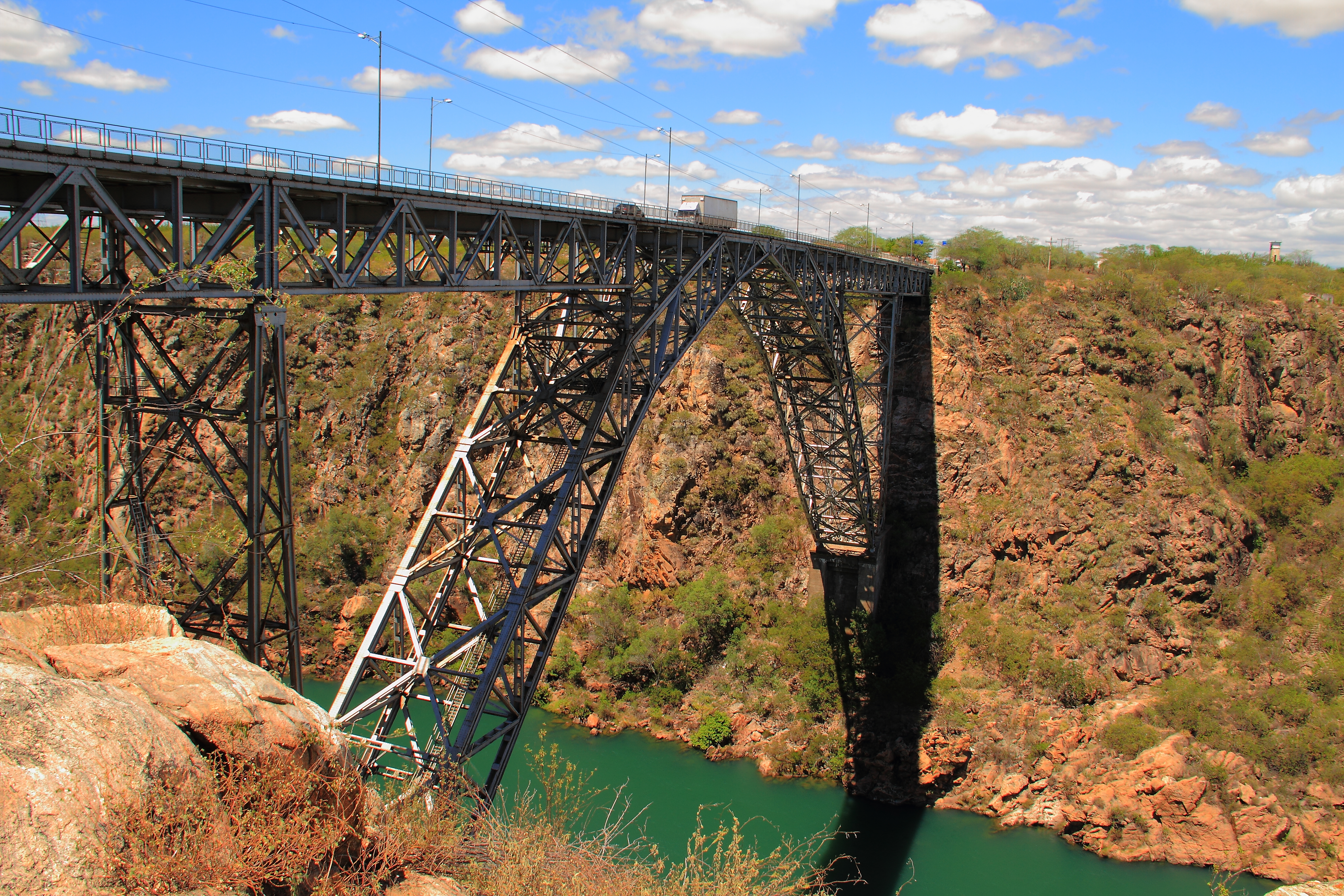
84 m high bridge over the São Francisco between the states of Bahia and Alagoas

The course of the river, running through five states, may be divided into four sections, as follows:

1. The high part, from its source to Pirapora in Minas Gerais
2. The upper middle part, from Pirapora, where the navigable part begins, up to Remanso (Bahia) and the Sobradinho Dam
3. The lower middle part, from the Sobradinho dam to Paulo Afonso, also in Bahia (bordering on Alagoas), and ending at the Itaparica Dam
4. The low part, from Paulo Afonso to the river's mouth on the Atlantic Ocean

== Tributaries ==
The river obtains water from 168 rivers and streams, of which 90 are on the right bank and 78 on the left bank. The main tributaries are:

- Paraopeba River
- Abaeté River
- Das Velhas River
- Jequitaí River
- Paracatu River
- Urucuia River
- Verde Grande River
- Carinhanha River
- Corrente River
- Grande River

== Navigability ==
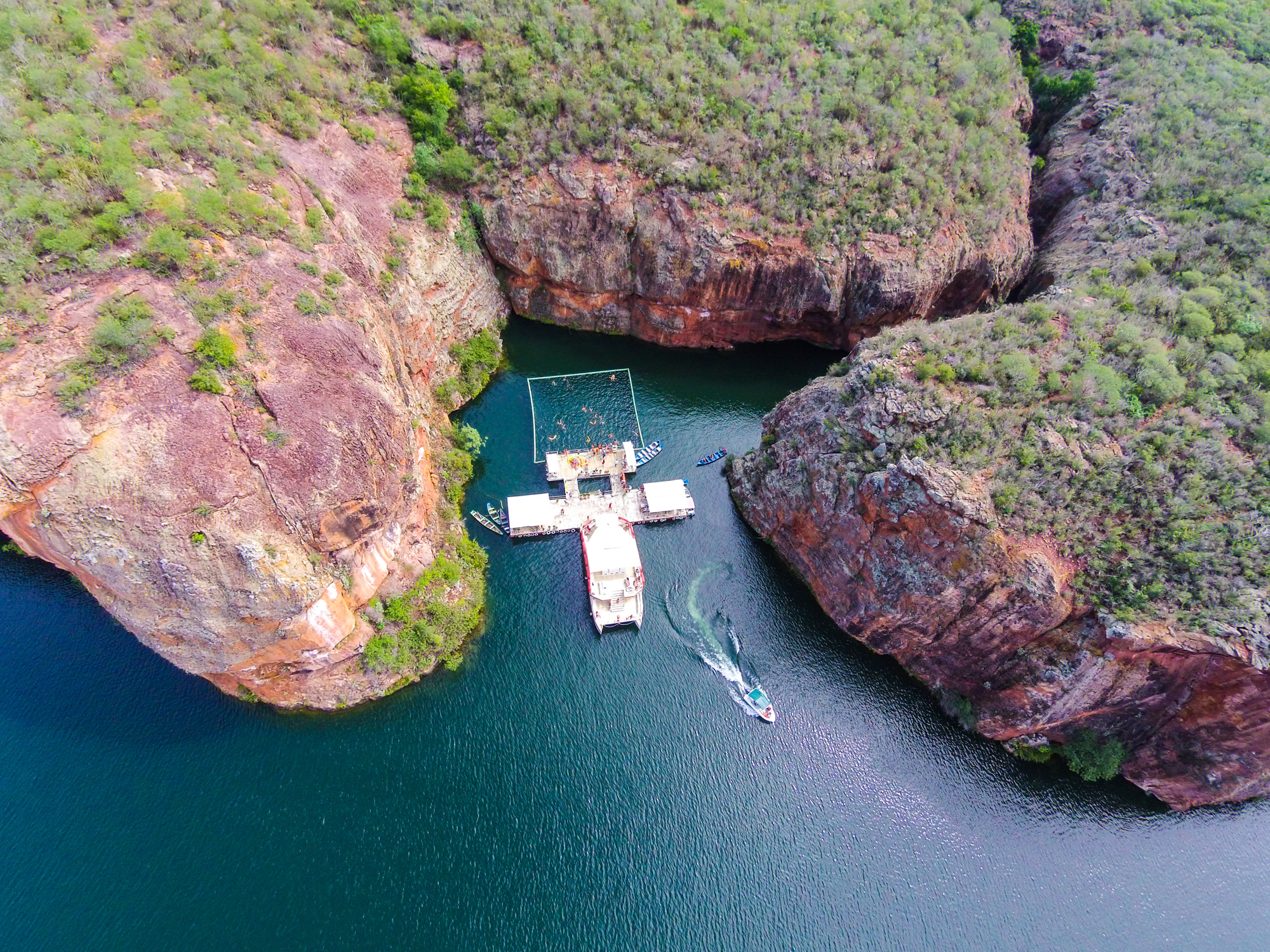
A river canyon on the São Francisco river.

The São Francisco is naturally navigable all through the year between Pirapora (Minas Gerais) and the twin cities of Petrolina (Pernambuco) and Juazeiro (Bahia), a length of 1,371 kilometres (852 mi). However, there are large variations in depth depending on the rainfall. Because of the diversity of physical characteristics over the course of the navigable stretch, it may be divided into three substretches, as follows:

- From Pirapora to Pilão Arcado (Bahia), a length of 1,015 kilometres (631 mi); differences in height up to 6 metres (20 ft) may occur due to rains and drought.
- From Pilão Arcado to the Sobradinho Dam; the latter's reservoir is 314 kilometres (195 mi) long, with a surface area of 4,214 square kilometres (1,627 sq mi) and a comfortable depth.
- From the Sobradinho dam to Petrolina/Juazeiro, with a length of 42 kilometres (26 mi) and an average depth of 2 metres (6 ft 7 in), sustained by a flow of 1,500 m^{3}/s (53,000 cu ft/s).

Until recent years, the São Francisco was regularly navigated by a type of passenger boat called gaiola (Portuguese for "cage"). These were paddle-wheel steamboats, some of them having been Mississippi riverboats and dating from the time of the American Civil War. After the Sobradinho dam was built in Bahia, the conditions of navigability were altered considerably, since the reservoir's large size allowed for the formation of short waves of considerable height. Although the dam has a navigation lock, the waves and currents made traversing the lake difficult for the gaiolas. At the same time, deforestation and excessive agricultural use of the upper-course waters of the São Francisco and its tributaries greatly reduced the water flow in the middle course, creating sand banks and islands that hindered navigation.

In a short time, conditions were such that navigation became impossible for the large gaiolas, although still possible for smaller boats. The shells of those old riverboats can still be seen on the river at Pirapora. As of 2009, a single boat, the Benjamim Guimarães, remains in activity, making short-distance tourist cruises from Pirapora to São Romão and back.

== Fish ==
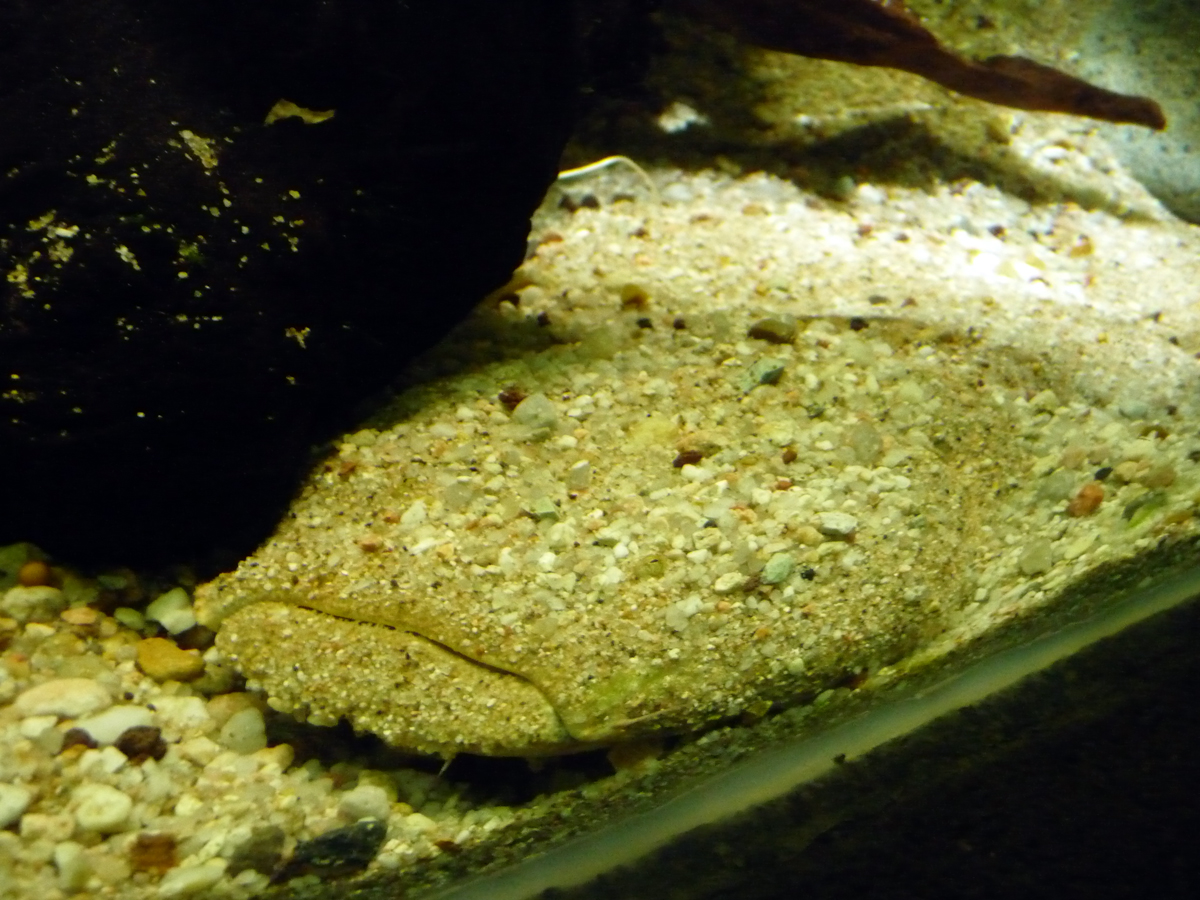
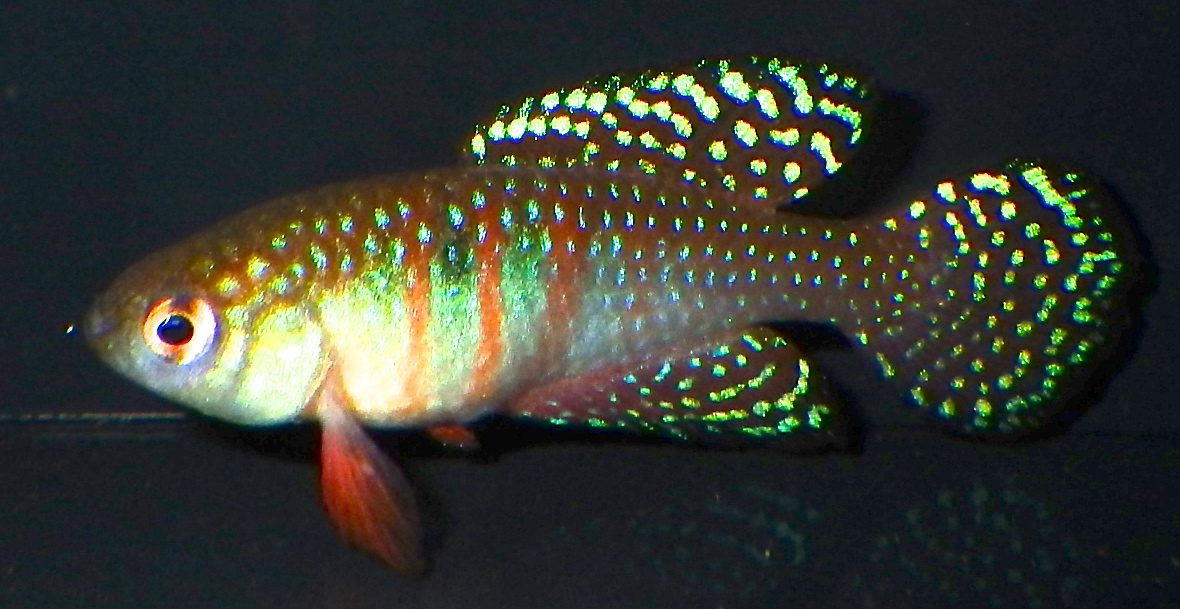
Two of the fish that are endemic to the river basin: Lophiosilurus alexandri and Hypsolebias magnificus

More than 200 fish species are known from the São Francisco River basin and it is expected that several additional species will be discovered in the future, especially from the relatively poorly known upper parts of the river. About 10% of the fish species known from the river basin are threatened and about 13% are important in fisheries. About 64% of the fish species known from the basin are endemic, including Conorhynchos conirostris (a catfish of uncertain taxonomic affinities), Lophiosilurus alexandri (a flattened catfish), Franciscodoras marmoratus (an armoured catfish), Pygocentrus piraya (the largest species of piranha), Orthospinus franciscensis (a characin and the only member of its genus), Hasemania nana (a small tetra that often is kept in aquariums), and Salminus franciscanus (a relative of the golden dorado). More than 40 annual killifish species are found in the São Francisco River basin, especially from the genera Cynolebias and Hypsolebias. Dams (preventing fish migrations on the river) and pollution do present a problem to the species in the river, and fish mass deaths have been recorded.

== Towns and population ==
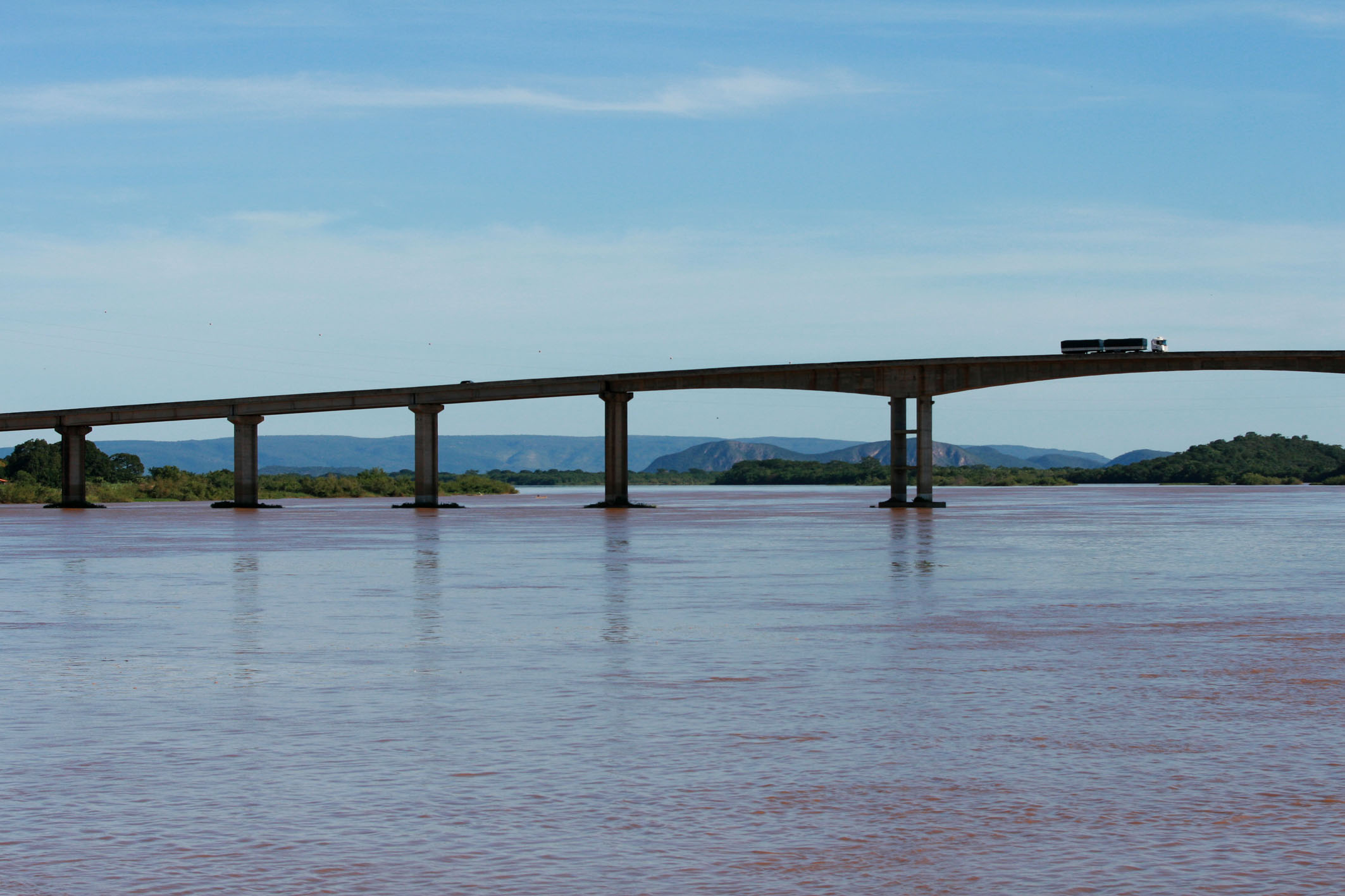
São Francisco River, in Ibotirama, BA, Brazil

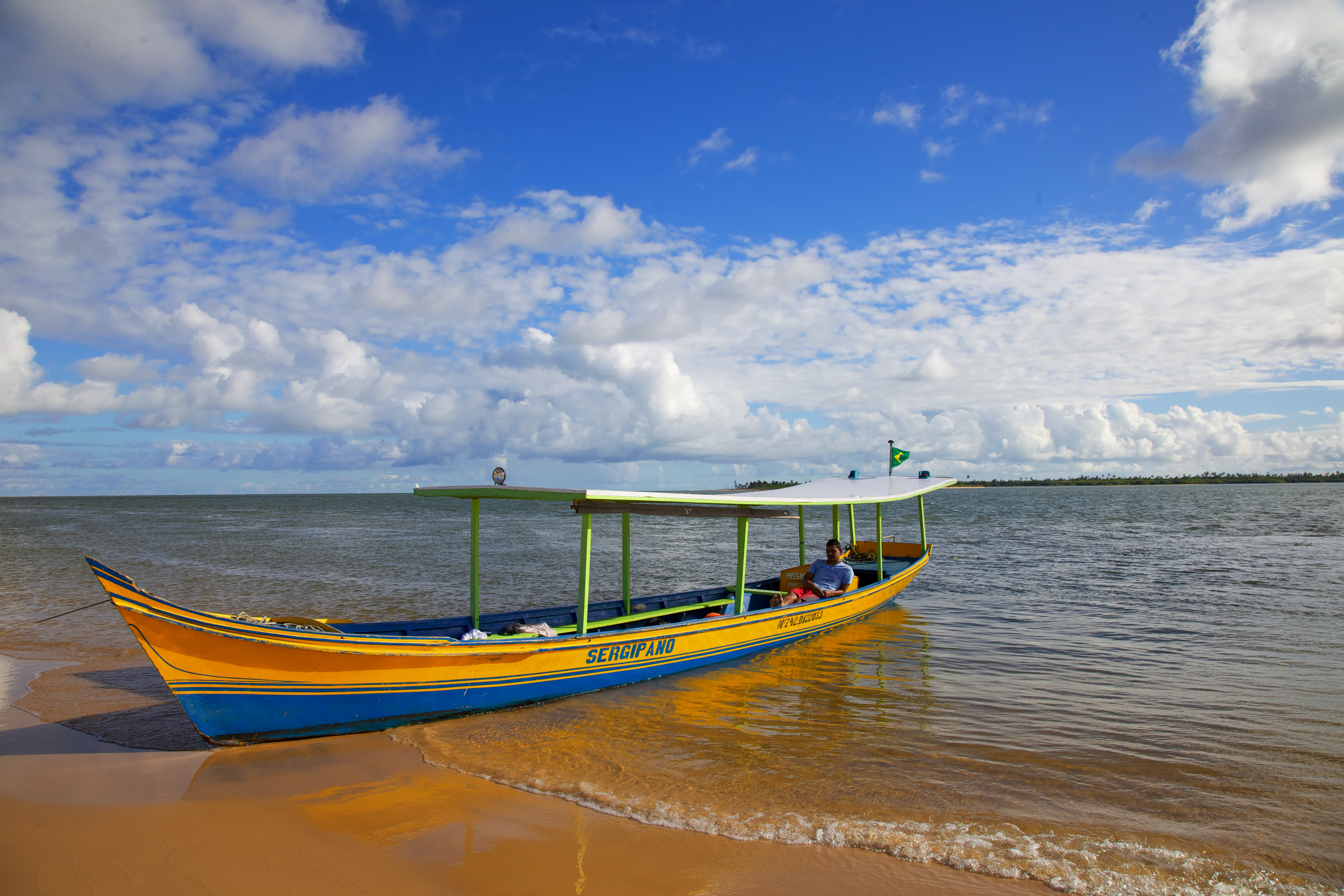
Mouth of the São Francisco river

The area crossed by the river is vast and sparsely populated, but several towns lie on the river. Beginning in Minas Gerais, the river passes by Pirapora, São Francisco, Januária, Bom Jesus da Lapa, the twin cities of Petrolina and Juazeiro, and Paulo Afonso. The hinterland is arid and underpopulated, so most of the towns are small and isolated. Only Petrolina and Juazeiro have grown into medium-sized cities and have become prosperous because of fruit production based on irrigation.

== Hydroelectric dams ==
The river's hydroelectric potential started being harnessed in 1955, when the Paulo Afonso dam was built between Bahia and Alagoas. The Paulo Afonso plant now provides electric power for the whole of Northeastern Brazil. Four other large hydroelectric plants were later built: Três Marias in Minas Gerais, built in 1961, Sobradinho in Bahia, built in 1977, Luiz Gonzaga (Itaparica), between Bahia and Pernambuco, in 1988 and the Xingó near Piranhas in 1994. The Sobradinho reservoir is one of the largest artificial lakes in the world, with an area of 4,214 square kilometres (1,627 sq mi).

The section of dramatic canyons between the Paulo Afonso and Xingó dams, including part of the Xingó reservoir, is protected by the 26,736 hectares (66,070 acres) Rio São Francisco Natural Monument.

== Cultural significance ==
The São Francisco has great importance in history and particularly in folklore. That history is celebrated in song, legend and souvenirs based on the carrancas, a kind of gargoyle placed on the prow of the gaiola boats and intended to scare away river demons from the boat. Tourist shops far from the river have modernized replicas and miniatures of the vanishing originals. The stories of river demons and monsters persist today.

From Paulo Afonso to the historic town of Penedo (Alagoas), the river lies at the bottom of a gorge or steep sided valley. Piranhas, a nearby town, was once the terminus of a railroad. The town has a number of abandoned historical buildings from that period. They have been restored and are emerging as a tourist attraction.

== Controversial diversion project (under construction) ==
In 2005, the Brazilian government proposed a controversial water diversion project that will bring water from the river to semiarid areas of four Brazilian states (Ceará, Pernambuco, Paraíba and Rio Grande do Norte). Environmentalists argue that the project will do more harm than good, benefitting only large landowners and a very small population, while bringing considerable ecological impact. The government insists that the project will give the people in the four states a much-needed water supply.

The diversion project intake point is located at Cabrobó.
