= Paulo Afonso Hydroelectric Complex =

Brazilian hydroelectric project

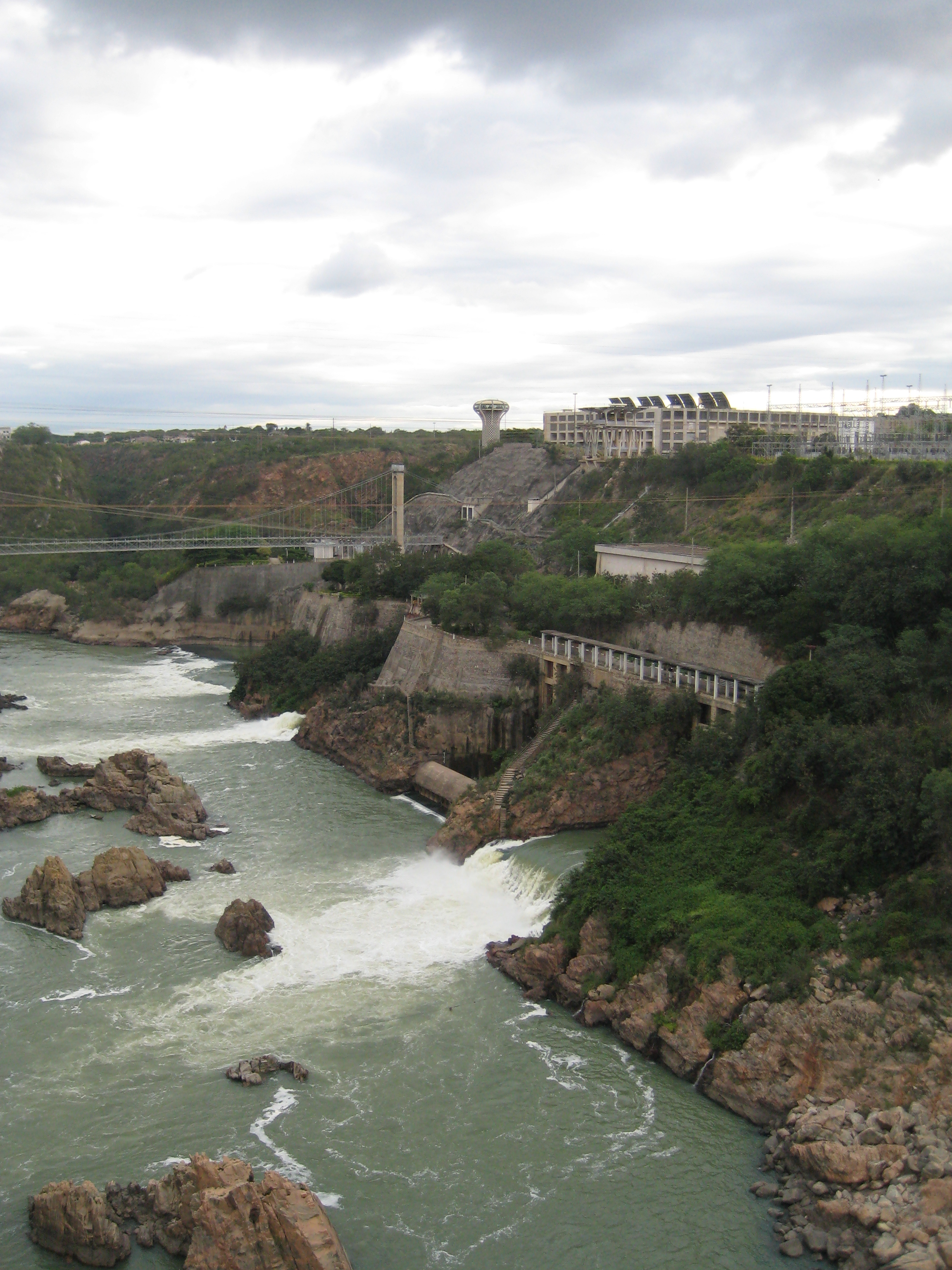
- A view of Paulo Afonso I, II and III
- Country: Brazil
- Location: Paulo Afonso
- Coordinates: 9°23′49″S 38°12′08″W
- Status: Operational
- Commission date: 1954–1979
- Owner: CHESF

Thermal power station
- Turbine technology: Hydroelectric

Power generation
- Units operational: 23
- Nameplate capacity: 4,279.6 MW (5,739,000 hp)

External links
- Commons: Related media on Commons

The Paulo Afonso Hydroelectric Complex (Complexo Hidrelétrico de Paulo Afonso), also known as the Paulo Afonso Complex, is a system of three dams and five hydroelectric power plants on the São Francisco River near the city of Paulo Afonso in Bahia, Brazil. The complex exploits an 80-metre (260 ft) natural gap on the river, known as the Paulo Afonso Falls. Constructed in succession between 1948 and 1979, the dams support the Paulo Afonso I, II, III, IV and Apollonius Sales (Moxotó) power plants which contain a total of 23 generators with an installed capacity of 4,279.6 megawatts (5,739,000 hp).

PA I was the first large power plant constructed in Brazil and the complex constitutes the densest area of dams in Brazil. The complex provides electricity to areas in northeastern Brazil and is the main tourist attraction in the region.

== Background and history ==
On January 23, 1913, the 1.1 MW Angiquinho Hydroelectric Plant, built by industrialist Delmiro Gouveia, was the first use of the Paulo Afonso Falls for power production and the first hydroelectric power plant in northeastern Brazil. Construction of the power plant was intended to spur economic growth in the area and soon after another hydroelectric plant was constructed upstream near Petrolândia. By the 1940s Brazil's Ministry of Agriculture recognized the importance of harnessing the São Francisco River for economic development in the semi-arid region. They began to plan the river's development and the Companhia Hidro-Elétrica do São Francisco (CHESF) was formed in 1945. On May 23, 1944, construction on Paulo Afonso I had been authorized with two generators. Construction began in 1948; workers and engineers experienced difficulty diverting the river, transporting the turbines to the site while in midst of dangerous work conditions. Tunnels and a cavern had to be excavated for Brazil's first underground power plant. Due to the depth and strength of the river near the falls, it was not diverted until 1954. On January 15, 1955, Brazilian President João Café Filho inaugurated PA I. Previously, in 1953, CHESF negotiated with the government for a third generating unit at PA I and the excavation of another underground power plant for the future PA II adjacent to PA I on the falls. The third generator at PA I was commissioned on September 18, 1955, and construction of PA II began that year as well.

By 1961, PA II was complete and on October 24 that year, its first generator was commissioned. PA II's five other generators became operational between 1962 and December 18, 1967. Construction on PA III started soon after in 1967 and was complete in 1971 with its first generator commissioned on October 21 that year. Another generator was commissioned in 1972 and the final two in 1974, the last of which on August 5. In 1971, construction had moved to the Apollonius Sales (Moxotó) Dam and power plant 4 kilometres (2.5 mi) upstream from the falls. In 1977, construction was completed and its four generators went online in April of that year. In 1972, construction began on the final dam and power plant, PA IV, 2 kilometres (1.2 mi) southwest of the falls. Construction was complete in 1979 and its first generator commissioned on December 1. Two more generators were commissioned in 1980, two in 1981 and the final on May 28, 1983.

Construction of the dams caused a loss of 1,600 hectares (4,000 acres) of land along with displacing 52,000 people.

== Specifications ==
=== Apolônio Sales (Moxotó) ===
The Apolônio Sales Dam and power plant were originally known as Moxotó but were renamed after Apolônio Sales, the founder of CHESF. The dam is a 30 metres (98 ft) high, 2,825 metres (9,268 ft) long rock and earth-fill embankment dam. The dam creates a 1,200,000,000 cubic metres (970,000 acre⋅ft) capacity reservoir with a surface area of 100 square kilometres (39 sq mi) and catchment area of 630,000 square kilometres (240,000 sq mi). The dam and its reservoir are primarily intended to regulate water flow to PA I, II and III 4 km downstream. On the dam's west side, it supports a 20 floodgate spillway with a 28,000 cubic metres per second (990,000 cu ft/s) capacity. The power plant is located on the east side of the dam near the reservoir's shore and contains four generators, each with Kaplan turbines. Each generator has a nameplate capacity of 100 megawatts (130,000 hp) for a total installed capacity of 400 megawatts (540,000 hp).

=== Paulo Afonso I, II, III ===
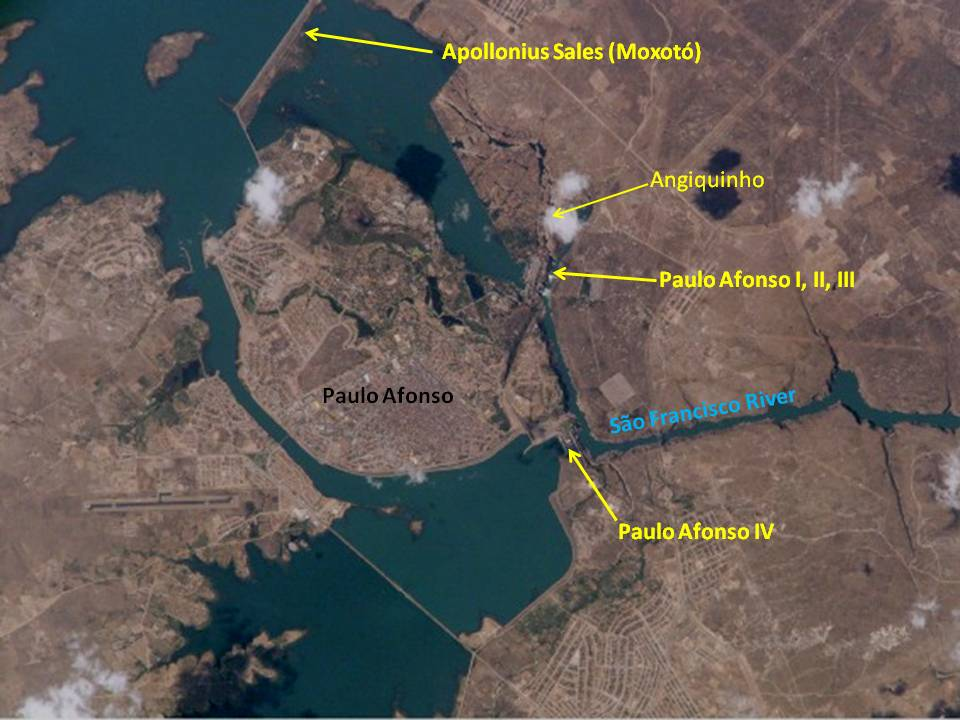
Overhead of the complex, click to expand

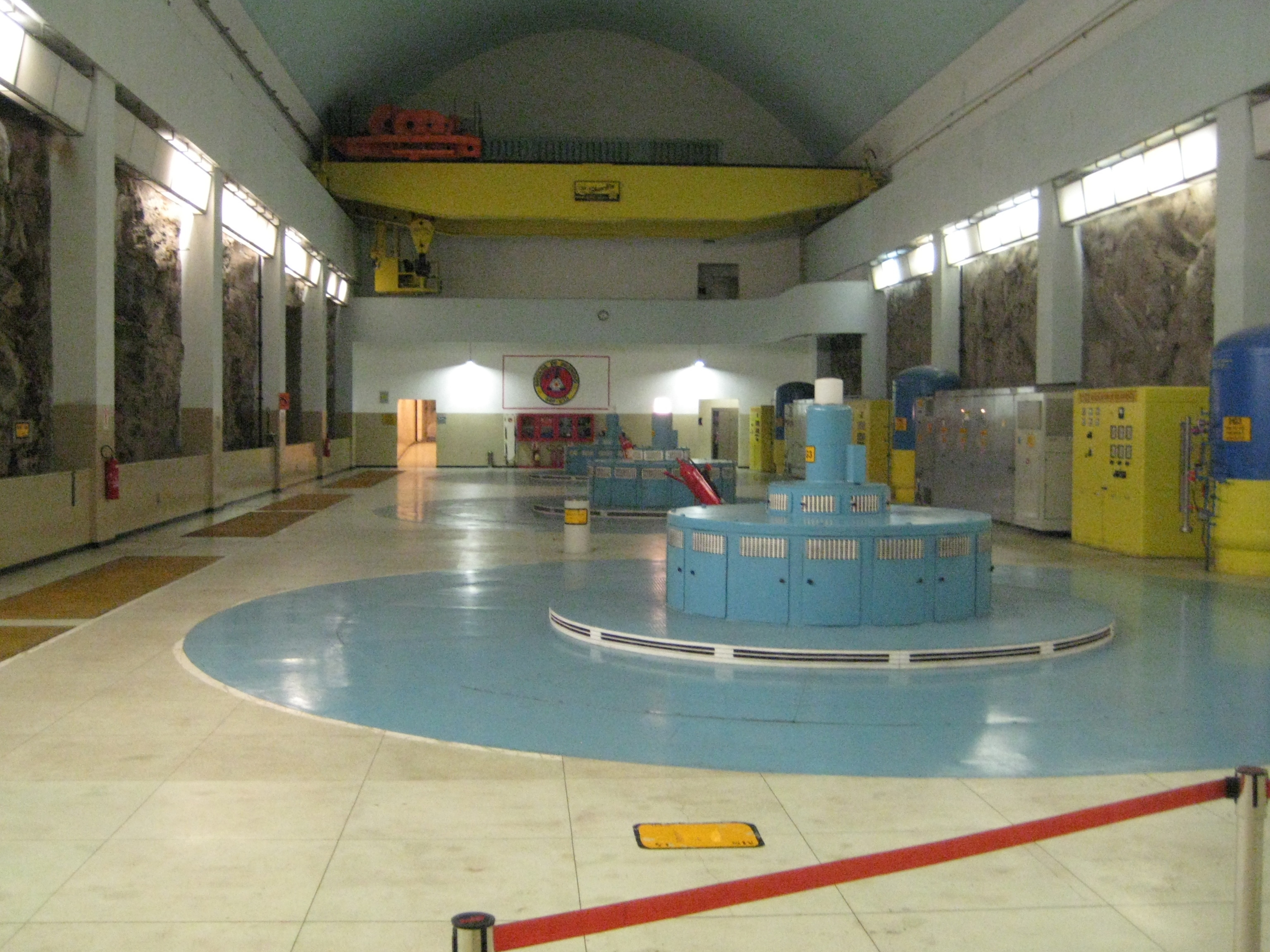
Generator hall of PA II

Situated directly on top of the Paulo Afonso Falls, the Delmiro Gouveia Dam supports Paulo Afonso I, II and III. The dam is 20 metres (66 ft) high, 4,707 metres (15,443 ft) long and is a concrete gravity type. The reservoir formed by the dam has a 26,000,000 cubic metres (21,000 acre⋅ft) capacity and surface area of 4.8 square kilometres (1.9 sq mi). The dam has one uncontrolled spillway and a controlled spillway on its outer linings while also supporting four controlled spillways on the front of the falls. These four surface spillways when open, discharge water below and essentially recreate the falls.

All three power plants are about 82 metres (269 ft) underground and adjacent to one another. PA I lies in the center and is housed in a 60-metre (200 ft) long, 31-metre (102 ft) high and 15-metre (49 ft) wide cavern. It contains three 60 megawatts (80,000 hp) generators with Francis turbines, for an installed capacity of 180 megawatts (240,000 hp). The generators are Vertical Sync-type and were manufactured by Westinghouse. The turbines were manufactured by Dominion Engineering Works. PA II is a 104-metre (341 ft) long, 36-metre (118 ft) high and 18-metre (59 ft) wide power house. It contains six Vertical Sync-type generators with Francis turbines. Two of the generators are 70 megawatts (94,000 hp), one is 75 megawatts (101,000 hp) and the remaining three are 176 megawatts (236,000 hp), for a total installing capacity of 443 megawatts (594,000 hp) MW. The generators were manufactured by S. Morgan Smith and Hitachi while the turbines by Voith. PA III's power house is 127 metres (417 ft) long, 46 metres (151 ft) high and 18 metres (59 ft) wide. It contains four 198.55 megawatts (266,260 hp) Vertical Sync-type generators manufactured by Siemens for an installed capacity of 795.2 megawatts (1,066,400 hp). Each generator utilizes a Francis turbine manufactured by Voith.

=== Paulo Afonso IV ===
The Paulo Afonso Dam located 2 kilometres (1.2 mi) southwest of the falls is 35 metres (115 ft) high and 7,430 metres (24,380 ft) long. The dam is an earth and rock-fill type but is 1,053 metres (3,455 ft) in length of concrete structures which include the power plant's intake and the spillway. The spillway is composed of eight floodgates and has a maximum discharge capacity of 10,000 cubic metres per second (350,000 cu ft/s). The dam withholds a 127,500,000 cubic metres (103,400 acre⋅ft) capacity reservoir with a surface area of 12.9 kilometres (8.0 mi). The reservoir receives water through a channel that originates near the southern end of the Appolonius Sales Reservoir and continues south, skirting the city. The PA IV power house is also underground and is 210 metres (690 ft) long, 52 metres (171 ft) high and 24 metres (79 ft) wide. It contains six 410.4 megawatts (550,400 hp) MW generators for an installed capacity of 2,462.4 megawatts (3,302,100 hp). Each generator is a SíncronoVertical-type manufactured by Siemens and utilizes vertical shaft Francis turbines that were manufactured by Voith.

== See also ==
- List of power stations in Brazil
