= Cueva Alfredo Jahn Natural Monument =

Cueva Alfredo Jahn Natural Monument Monumento Natural Cueva Alfredo Jahn
- IUCN category III (natural monument or feature)
- Location within Venezuela
- Location: Venezuela
- Coordinates: 10°28′33″N 66°16′28″W
- Area: 0.58 km^{2} (0.22 sq mi)
- Established: December 12, 1978

The Cueva Alfredo Jahn Natural Monument (Spanish: Monumento Natural Cueva Alfredo Jahn), also known as the Alfredo Jahn Cave Natural Monument or Tapa de Cambural Cave, is a protected area with the status of a natural monument located 4 km west of the town of Birongo, Miranda State, at the eastern end of the Coastal Range of the Cordillera de la Costa. With a 4.29 km gallery development, it is the largest cave in central Venezuela, the sixth in all of Venezuela, and one of the most visited in the country.

It was decreed a Natural Monument on December 12, 1978, with Decree No. 2989 published in the Official Gazette No. 2417 of March 7, 1979. The monument was named in honor of Alfredo Jahn, a pioneer of various scientific disciplines in Venezuela, such as geography, topography, astronomy, anthropology, linguistics, and botany, and who was also the founder of the Venezuelan Society of Natural Sciences.

The Alfredo Jahn Cave is a moist and still active cave formed by the action of the Cambural Gorge. Its calcite walls are covered with spectacular stalagmites, stalactites, and columns, which reach their maximum development in the Hall of the Chaguaramo or Hall of the Rain.

The temperature inside the cave ranges between 22 °C and 26 °C. The cave is surrounded by a pre-montane seasonal semideciduous forest and presents three dense tree layers.

== See also ==
- List of national parks of Venezuela
- Morros de Macaira Natural Monument

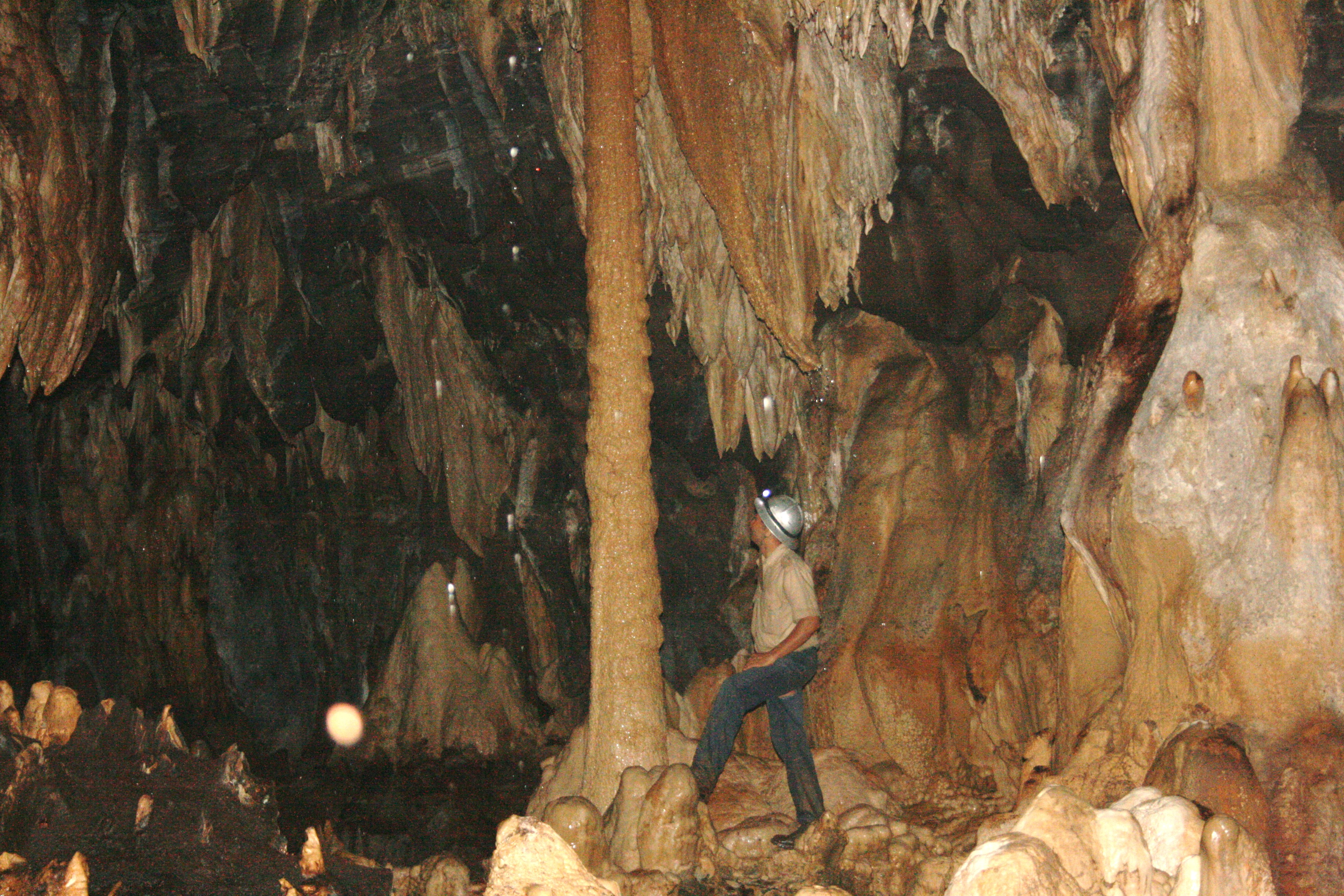
Internal View
