= Itá =

Itá may refer to:

- Itá, Paraguay, a Paraguayan city
- Itá, Santa Catarina, a Brazilian municipality
- Itá Dam, on the Uruguay River in Brazil
- Itá Hydroelectric Power Plant, on the Uruguay River in Brazil
