= Fritz Plaumann State Park =

State park in Santa Catarina, Brazil

- Parque Estadual Fritz Plaumann
- IUCN category II (national park)
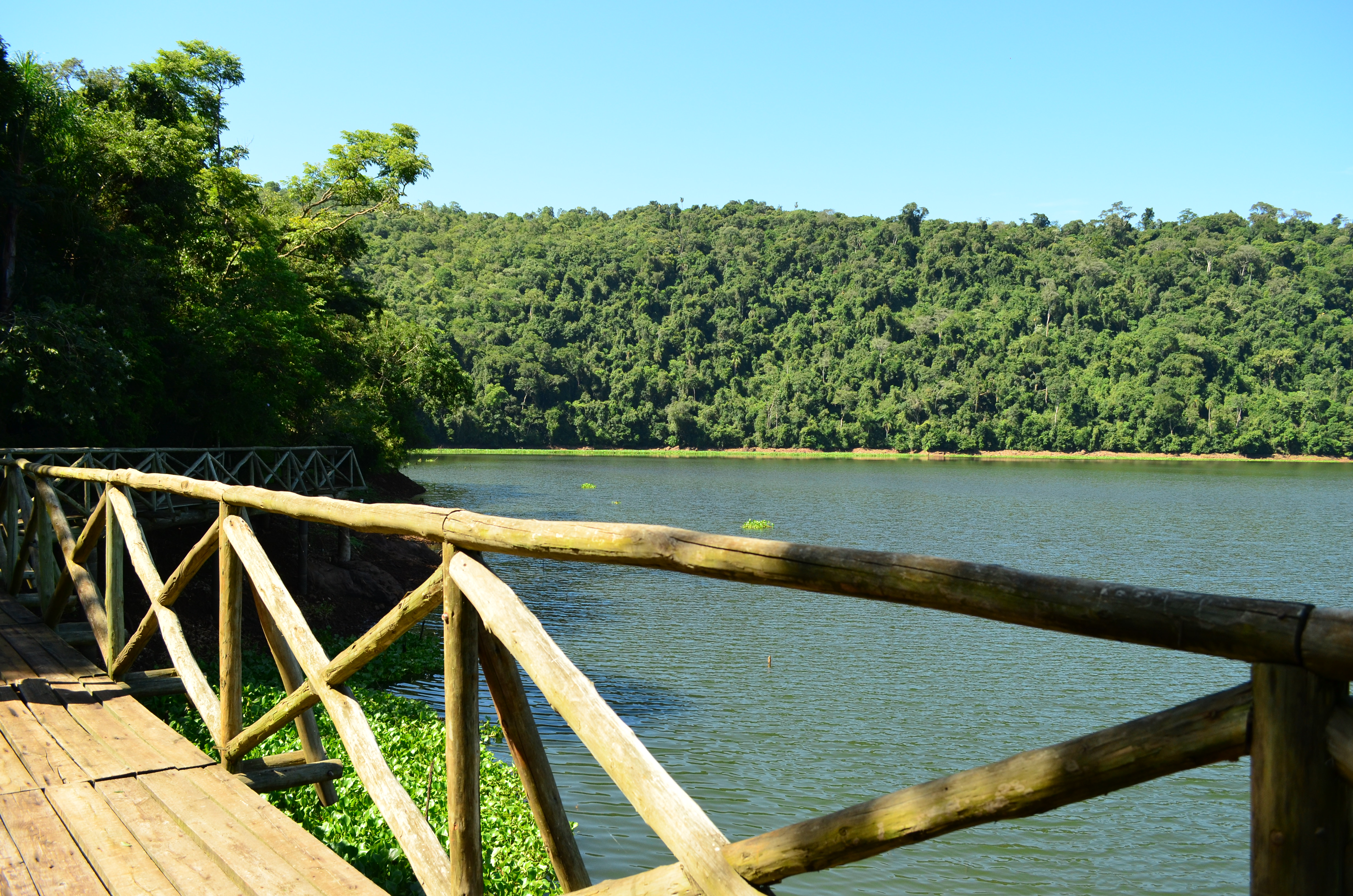
- Walkway beside the Itá Reservoir

- Location within Brazil
- Nearest city: Concórdia, Santa Catarina
- Coordinates: 27.296756°S 52.125968°W
- Area: 741 hectares (1,830 acres)
- Designation: State park
- Created: 24 September 2003
- Administrator: ECOPEF, FATMA
- Website: www.parquefritzplaumann.org.br

The Fritz Plaumann State Park (Portuguese: Parque Estadual Fritz Plaumann) is a state park in the state of Santa Catarina, Brazil. It protects one of the last remnants of seasonal deciduous forest in the state on the shore of the reservoir of the Itá Hydroelectric Power Plant.

== Location ==
The Fritz Plaumann State Park is in the municipality of Concórdia in the west of Santa Catarina. It has an area of 741 hectares (1,830 acres). It is named after a German scientist who lived in the region. Fritz Plaumann (1902–94) gathered more than 80,000 specimens of insects during his long career, now exhibited at the Fritz Plaumann Entomological Museum (Museu Entomológico Fritz Plaumann) in Seara. The collection is the largest in Latin America and one of the largest in the world.

The park is on the north shore of the lake formed by the dam of the Itá Hydroelectric Power Plant on the Uruguay River, built between 1990 and 2000. About 1/3 of the park is an island in the reservoir. The Queimados River rises above the city of Concórdia and its flooded mouth on the Uruguay River forms the western boundary of the park. The park contains the Lajeado Cruzeiro, a watercourse that has its sources around the park and its mouth near the flooded area of the Queimados River. The park's buffer zone is a 500 metres (1,600 ft) strip around the park, extending to include small hydrographic basins that drain into the park. There are about 70 farms in the buffer zone growing various crops and raising dairy cattle, pigs, poultry and sheep.

== History ==
Studies for implementation of conservation units to compensate for areas flooded by the Itá Dam began in 1990, and in 1994 an ecological station was defined with two parts, one in Santa Catarina and the other in Rio Grande do Sul. In 1996 the portion in Rio Grande do Sul was recategorized as the Teixeira Soares Municipal Nature Park, while the Santa Catarina portion remained an ecological station. (Note: The Teixeira Soares Uruguay Forest Municipal Nature Park was eventually implemented in 2008, and opened to the public in 2015.) Between 2000 and 2001 the management plan was prepared for what would be the Barra do Queimados Ecological Station. In 2003 public consultation were held on changing the management category and the name.

The Fritz Plaumann State Park was created by state decree 797 of 24 September 2003, the first and only conservation unit protected seasonal deciduous forest in the State of Santa Catarina. It was created as environmental compensation for the Itá Hydroelectric Power Plant. The objective is to conserve and restore biodiversity of the Uruguay River Forest by generating and socializing knowledge and experience. Land ownership has been fully regularized. The park has received various prizes for its environmental management work.

The ecological station management plan was revised and adapted in 2003 to 2004 to fit the state park category. The management plan was approved by FATMA ordinance 082/05 of 13 October 2005. The park was opened to the public in November 2007. A revised management plan was approved in November 2014. The park is managed by the Fritz Plaumann State Park Co-Management Team (ECOPEF), a civil society organization created in 2007, in cooperation with FATMA, the Santa Catarina environmental agency.

== Environment ==
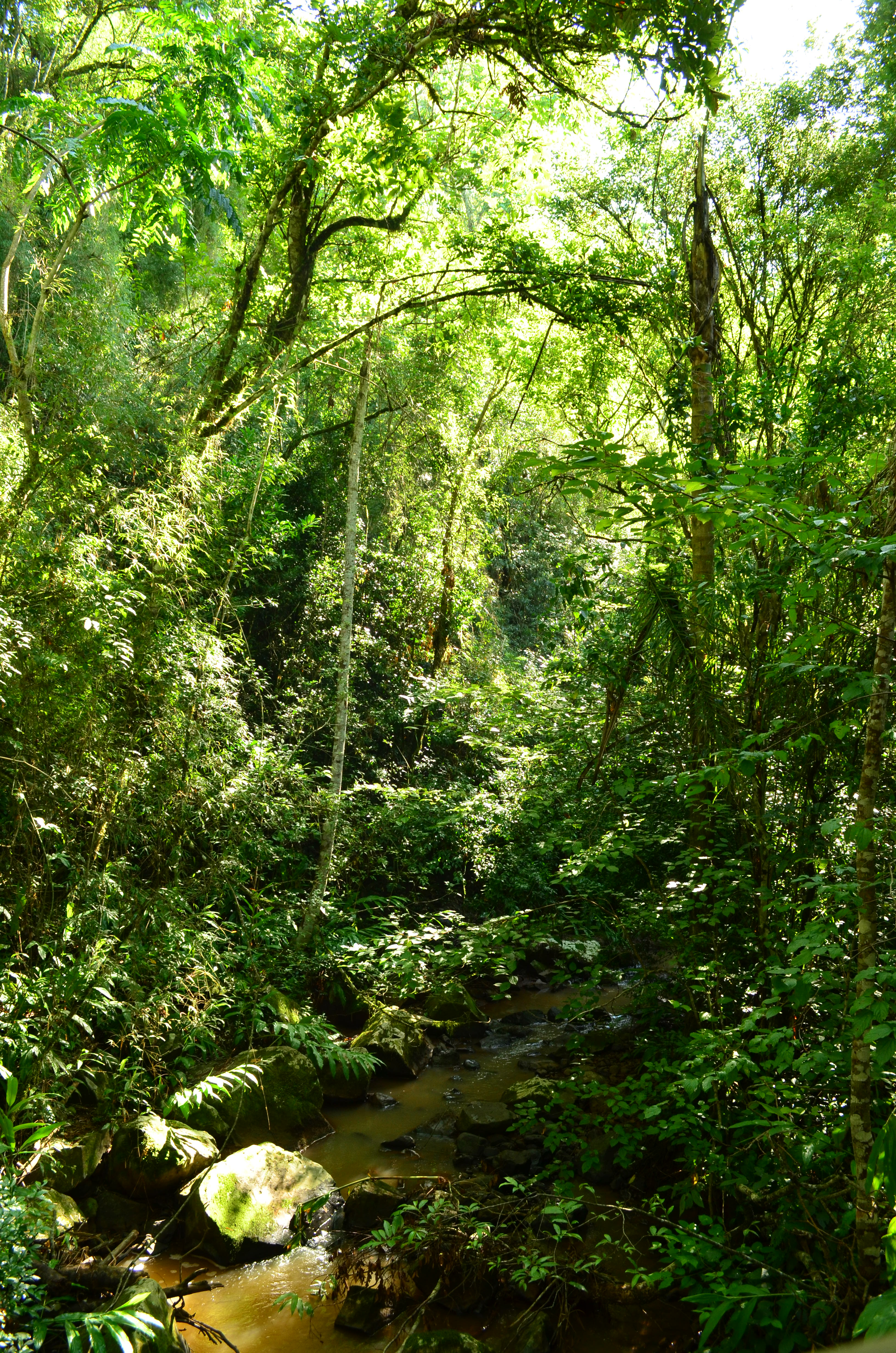
View from a trail in the park

The park fully protects a remnant of Uruguay River Forest, a seasonal deciduous forest. The forest has typical plant species such as canafístula (Pelthoporum dubium), grápia (Apuleia leocarpa), cedar (Cedrela fissilis) and angico-vermelho (Parapiptadenia rigida).

Many of the species of fauna in the park are threatened by hunting and deforestation. They include the tufted capuchin (Sapajus apella), lowland paca (Cuniculus paca), southern tamandua (Tamandua tetradactyla), red brocket (Mazama americana), Azara's agouti (Dasyprocta azarae), dusky-legged guan (Penelope obscura), the frog Vitreorana uranoscopa and snakes such as Bothrops neuwiedi and Spilotes pullatus.

The main threats to the environment of the park are invasive forest species such as Hovenia dulcis and Hedychium coronarium, pollution from waste dumped into the Queimados River, and predatory hunting and fishing in and around the park.

== Facilities ==
As of 2016 the park was open to the public on Wednesdays, Thursdays and Fridays from 14:00 to 17:00, on Saturday from 9:00 to 17:00 and on Sunday from 13:00 to 18:00. The visitor center has an exhibition room with a model and multi-themed panels on the nature and biodiversity of the area. It also contains a study hall, auditorium and housing for researchers.

Several trails start from the visitor center. The 140-metre (460 ft) Marrequinhas Trail is wheelchair accessible, with a theme of reservoir ecology, rivers and ecological relations in a fluvial environment. The 1,460-metre (4,790 ft) Lajeado Cruzeiro Trail takes one hour and a half for a guided walk, and has a theme of water resources and pollution problems. The 2,440-metre (8,010 ft) Mirante (Lookout) Trail is of moderate difficulty and takes two hours. Its theme is understanding of the hydrographic basins and the transformation of the landscape by human activity. The 2,160-metre (7,090 ft) Canafístula Trail is moderate to difficult and takes two hours. Small groups are given guided tours. The theme is basic concepts of ecology and biodiversity of the Uruguay River Forest.

== Sources ==
- Parque Estadual Fritz Plaumann (in Portuguese), Apremavi
- Parque Estadual Fritz Plaumann (in Portuguese), Fatma, archived from the original on 2019-02-12
- Parque Estadual Fritz Plaumann (in Portuguese), Parque Estadual Fritz Plaumann
- "Parque Natural Municipal Mata do Rio Uruguai Teixeira Soares: uma Unidade de Conservação que conta história de uma região", Jornal Boa Vista (in Portuguese), 3 July 2015
- Silva, Eduardo Hermes (November 2014), Plano De Manejo Fase II - Resumo Executivo (PDF) (in Portuguese), CAIPORA / FATMA / ECOPEF
- Turismo ecológico é o atrativo do Parque Estadual Fritz Plaumann (in Portuguese), Santa Catarina Government, 2 January 2014
