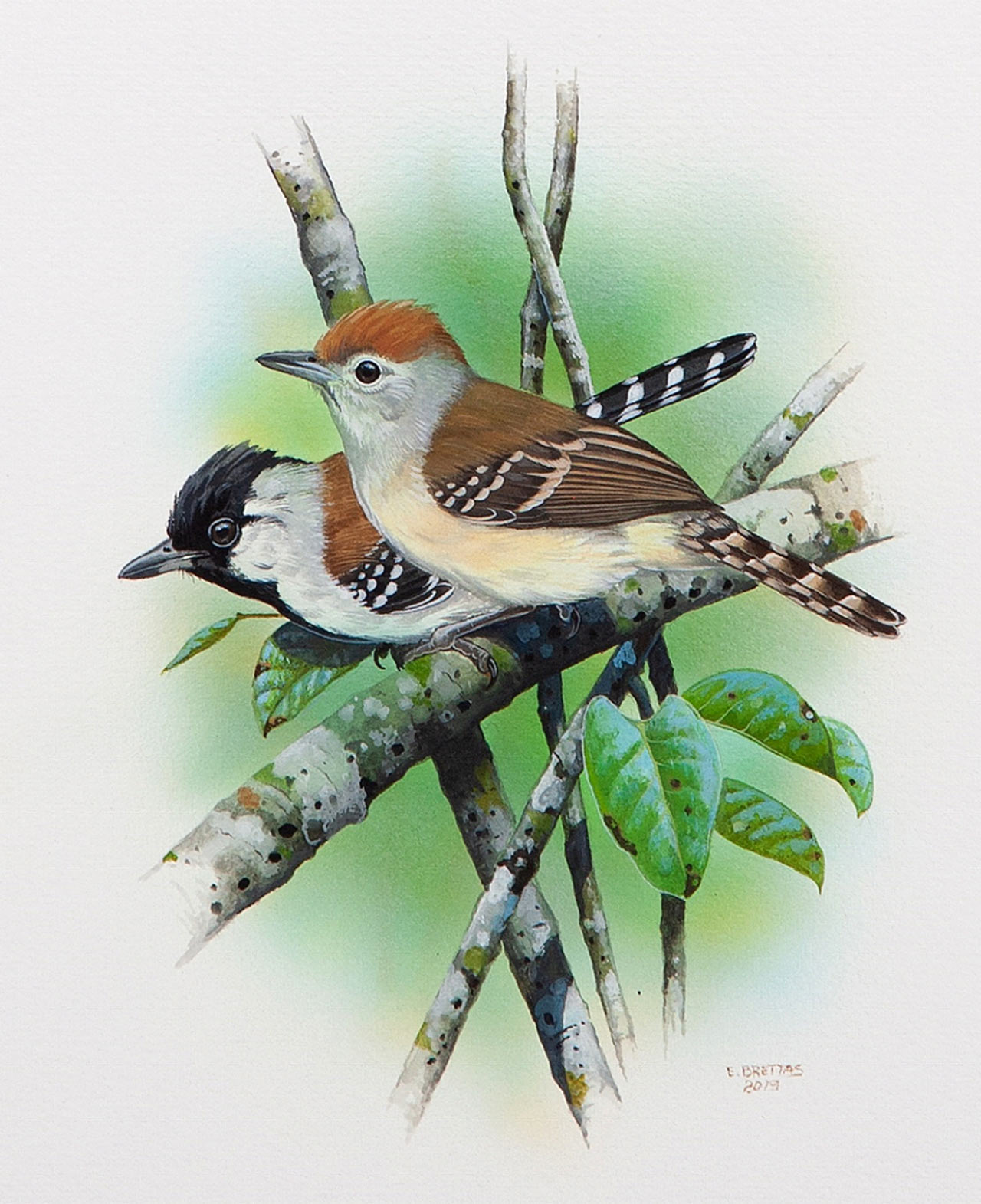

Scientific classification
- Domain: Eukaryota
- Kingdom: Animalia
- Phylum: Chordata
- Class: Aves
- Order: Passeriformes
- Family: Thamnophilidae
- Genus: Sakesphoroides
- Species: S. niedeguidonae

Binomial name
- Sakesphoroides niedeguidonae Cerqueira et al., 2024

= Northern silvery-cheeked antshrike =

Species of bird in Brazil

The northern silvery-cheeked antshrike (Sakesphoroides niedeguidonae) is a species of bird in subfamily Thamnophilinae of family Thamnophilidae, the "typical antbirds". It is endemic to northern Brazilian Caatinga habitats and found almost exclusively north of the São Francisco River. Small populations are also reported to be south of the river at Raso da Catarina. The northern silvery-cheeked antshrike was identified as a separate species and split from the silvery-cheeked antshrike (Sakesphoroides cristatus) in 2024 after review of over a thousand specimens and more than one-hundred sound recordings revealed a clear geographical split between the two groups.

== Description ==
In general the northern silvery-cheeked antshrike is very similar in appearance to the very closely related S. cristatus, with females showing more overt differences than males. Most notably the northern silvery-cheeked antshrike has an overall lighter amber color and shows black and white barring down the tail feathers.

== Behavior ==
The northern silvery-cheeked antshrike has been recorded flycatching and turning leaf litter for ants, spiders, termites, beetles and caterpillars. It is known to forage in pairs or mixed-species flocks.

Very little is known about the birds breeding biology, however males have been observed defending territory and responding to audio playback. The northern silvery-cheeked antshrike's 'loudsong' is slower, longer, and has many more notes than S. cristatus.

== Name ==
The specific epithet niedeguidonae honors Brazilian archaeologist Niède Guidon, who is credited with exploring prehistoric sites in the Americas in the 1970s.
