= Itá Hydroelectric Power Plant =

Itá Dam
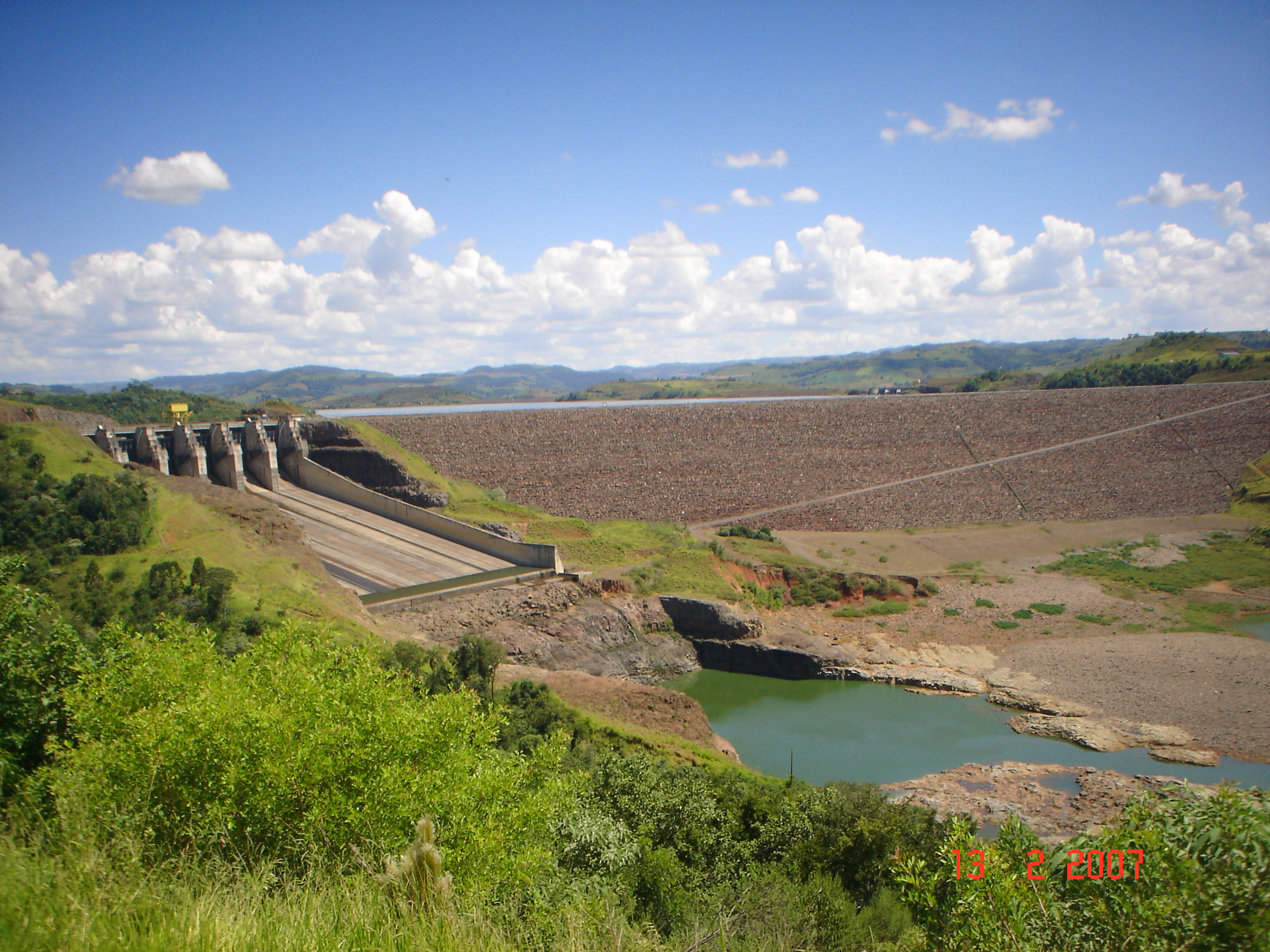
- Itá Dam in 2007

- Location within Brazil
- Official name: Itá Hydroelectric Power Plant
- Location: Itá, Santa Catarina/Rio Grande do Sul, Brazil
- Coordinates: 27°16′38″S 52°23′00″W
- Construction began: 1980
- Opening date: 2000
- Construction cost: $1.4 billion USD
- Owner: Tractebel Energia

Dam and spillways
- Type of dam: Embankment, concrete face rock-fill
- Impounds: Uruguay River
- Height: 125 m (410 ft)
- Length: 880 m (2,890 ft)
- Spillway type: Service, controlled
- Spillway capacity: 49,940 m^{3}/s (1,764,000 cu ft/s)

Reservoir
- Creates: Itá Reservoir
- Total capacity: 5,100,000,000 m^{3} (4,100,000 acre⋅ft)
- Catchment area: 45,800 km^{2} (17,700 sq mi)
- Surface area: 141 km^{2} (54 sq mi)

Power Station
- Commission date: 2000-2001
- Type: Conventional
- Turbines: 5 x Francis turbines
- Installed capacity: 1,450 MW (1,940,000 hp)

The Itá Hydroelectric Power Plant is a dam and hydroelectric power plant on the Uruguay River near Itá on the border of Santa Catarina and Rio Grande do Sul, Brazil. The power station has a 1,450-megawatt (1,940,000 hp) capacity and is supplied with water by a concrete face rock-fill embankment dam. It is owned and operated by Tractebel Energia and produces the equivalent of 60% of the energy consumed in Santa Catarina.

== Background ==
Construction on Itá originally began in 1980 but was halted in 1987 because of financial conditions. In 1995, construction recommenced after a consortium was formed and the dam was complete in 2000. Most of the 6,000 people that were in the town of Itá were relocated to a new area above the reservoir. The 741-hectare (1,830-acre) Fritz Plaumann State Park was created in 2003 as environmental compensation for the dam.

== Itá Dam ==
The Itá Dam is a 880-metre (2,890 ft) long and 125-metre (410 ft) high concrete face rock-fill embankment dam with a crest elevation of 375.5 metres (1,232 ft) above sea level. The dam's reservoir has a capacity of 5,100,000,000 m^{3} (4,100,000 acre⋅ft), surface area of 141 square kilometres (54 sq mi) and catchment area of 45,800 square kilometres (17,700 sq mi). The dam supports two spillways, one of its right abutment with six floodgates and another on the ridge to the dam's west, just south of the power plant which has 4 floodgates. Each gate measures 21.8 metres (72 ft) wide and 18 metres (59 ft) tall and in total, both spillways have a maximum capacity of 49,940 cubic metres per second (1,764,000 cu ft/s). Also on the ridge is the power plant's intake and three axillary dikes to support the reservoir level. The power plant intake is 84.5 metres (277 ft) wide and contains five gates that allow water to enter the five penstocks that are 8 metres (26 ft) in diameter and average 197 metres (646 ft) in length.

== Power plant ==
The above ground power station is 172.5 metres (566 ft) long and 57 metres (187 ft) wide and contains five 290-megawatt (390,000 hp) generators powered by Francis turbines. The first generator was commissioned in July 2000 and four more later that year with the last generator being commissioned in March 2001.

== See also ==
- List of power stations in Brazil
