= Vitreorana parvula =

Conservation status
- Vulnerable (IUCN 3.1)

Scientific classification
- Kingdom: Animalia
- Phylum: Chordata
- Class: Amphibia
- Order: Anura
- Family: Centrolenidae
- Genus: Vitreorana
- Species: V. parvula

Binomial name
- Vitreorana parvula (Boulenger, 1895)

Synonyms
- Hyalinobatrachium parvulum (Boulenger, 1895)

Species of amphibian

Vitreorana parvula is a species of small green frog in the family Centrolenidae. It is closely related to Vitreorana uranoscopa. It is endemic to Brazil. Its natural habitats are subtropical or tropical moist lowland forests, rivers, and intermittent freshwater marshes, but it is threatened by habitat loss.

== Sources ==
- IUCN SSC Amphibian Specialist Group; Instituto Boitatá de Etnobiologia e Conservação da Fauna (2022). "Vitreorana parvula". IUCN Red List of Threatened Species. 2022 e.T55027A116037680.
- AmphibiaWeb - Vitreorana parvula
