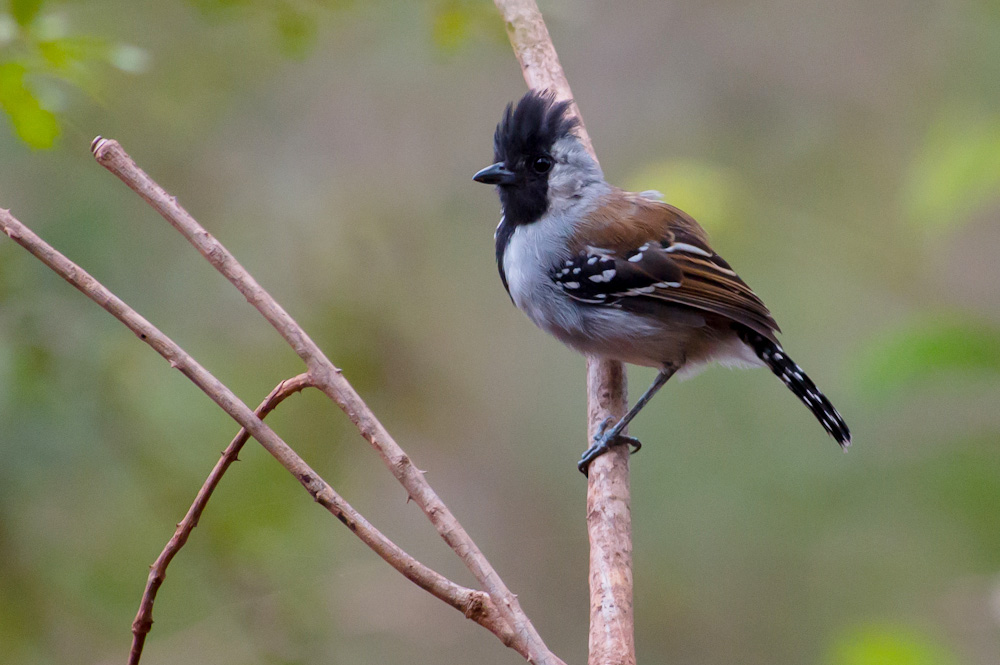
- Male
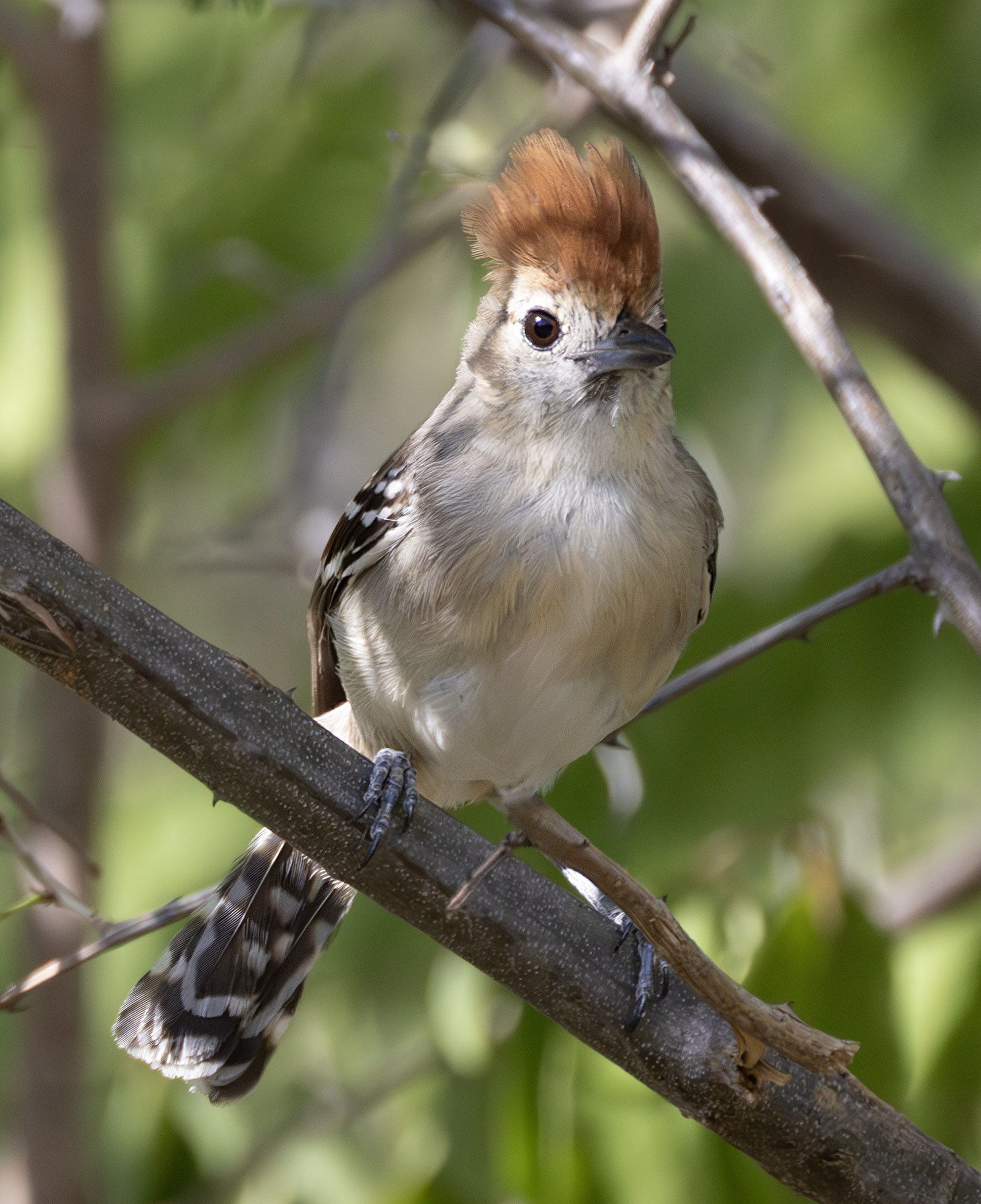
- Female

Conservation status
- Least Concern (IUCN 3.1)

Scientific classification
- Kingdom: Animalia
- Phylum: Chordata
- Class: Aves
- Order: Passeriformes
- Family: Thamnophilidae
- Genus: Sakesphoroides; Grantsau, 2010
- Species: S. cristatus

Binomial name
- Sakesphoroides cristatus (Wied, 1831)

Synonyms
- Sakesphorus cristatus

= Silvery-cheeked antshrike =

Species of bird

The silvery-cheeked antshrike (Sakesphoroides cristatus) is a species of bird in subfamily Thamnophilinae of family Thamnophilidae, the "typical antbirds". It is endemic to Brazil.

== Taxonomy and systematics ==
The silvery-cheeked antshrike was originally described as Turdus cristatus. and was later transferred to genus Sakesphorus. Its transfer to the new genus Sakesphoroides was proposed in 2010 based on the species' distinctive morphology. It uniqueness was confirmed by a genetic study published in 2021. Based on that study, the South American Classification Committee of the American Ornithological Society (SACC), the International Ornithological Congress (IOC), and the Clements taxonomy moved the silvery-cheeked antshrike to Sakesphoroides. However, as of January 2025 BirdLife International's Handbook of the Birds of the World (HBW) retained it in Sakesphorus.

The silvery-cheeked antshrike is the only member of genus Sakesphoroides. It was long treated as monotypic but a study published in 2024 proposed splitting it into two sub species. The IOC and Clements soon implemented the split. They now recognize the "southern" nominate subspecies S. c. critatus (Wied, 1831) and the "northern" S. c. niedeguidonae (Cerqueira, Gonçalves, Quaresma, Silva, Pichorim & Aleixo, 2024). As of March 2025 the SACC has not recognized the split but is urgently seeking a formal proposal to evaluate it. As of January 2025 HBW had not implemented the split.

This article follows the two-subspecies model.

== Description ==
The silvery-cheeked antshrike is about 14 cm (5.5 in) long. Both sexes have a crest. Adult males of both subspecies have a black forehead, crest, front of the face, throat, and breast center. The rest of their head and underparts are grayish white. Their back is brown. Their wings are black with white tips on the coverts and cinnamon edges on the flight feathers. Their tail is black with white spots and feather tips. Adult females of the nominate subspecies have a rufous forehead, crest, and crown. The rest of their head and their underparts are pale buffy brown. The back is brown like the male's. Their wings are brown with white tips on the coverts and cinnamon edges on the flight feathers. Their tail is rufous-brown with no white. Adult females of subspecies S. c. niedeguidonae have an amber crest and crown. Their back is olive brown. They have thinner cinnamon edges on the flight feathers than the nominate. Their tail has large black, white, and amber bands.

== Distribution and habitat ==
The silvery-cheeked antshrike is a bird of the caatinga of northeastern Brazil. Subspecies S. c. niedeguidonae is the more northerly of the two and has the smaller range. It is found from Ceará and central and western Rio Grande do Norte south to the left bank of the middle São Francisco River and south of it downstream in the Raso da Catarina area. The nominate subspecies is found from south of the São Francisco south into central Minas Gerais. It inhabits the understorey to mid-story of deciduous forest and arid caatinga, and also the ecotone between deciduous and ridgetop evergreen forest. It favors areas where the forest has a closed canopy, such as mata-de-cipó. In elevation it ranges from sea level to 1,100 m (3,600 ft).

== Behavior ==
=== Movement ===
The silvery-cheeked antshrike is believed to be a year-round resident throughout its range.

=== Feeding ===
The silvery-cheeked antshrike's diet includes insects and other arthropods; it favors ants and termites, and during the breeding season caterpillars. It mostly forages singly or in pairs and sometimes as a member of a mixed-species feeding flock. It typically forages from the ground to 2 m (7 ft) above it but also as high as 10 m (30 ft). It captures prey mostly by reaching up from the ground or a perch to glean from leaves, vines, and branches. It also pounces onto prey from a perch to the ground, and less often hitches its way up branches and through vine tangles.

=== Breeding ===
Nothing is known about the silvery-cheeked antshrike's breeding biology.

=== Vocalization ===
The subspecies of the silvery-cheeked antshrike have some vocal differences. The loudsong of subspecies S. c. niedeguidonae is "an initial series of sharp notes with frequency modulation (rapid increase and decrease, like an inverted 'U' in shape) followed by a short series of final raspy notes". That of the nominate subspecies "has the initial series of sharp notes with a different type of frequency modulation (i.e. rapid increase, decrease, short duration stable and decrease again, in a sigmoid shape), and short final raspy notes". Their calls apparently do not differ and include a " deep clear whistle, and [a] more abrupt clear note sometimes repeated rapidly 3–4 times".

== Status ==
The IUCN has assessed the silvery-cheeked antshrike as being of Least Concern. Its population size is not known and is believed to be decreasing. No immediate threats have been identified. It is considered fairly common across its range and occurs in one national park. "Mata-de-cipó and taller caatinga woodlands are habitats under increasing threat from agricultural conversion, grazing, and cutting for firewood."
