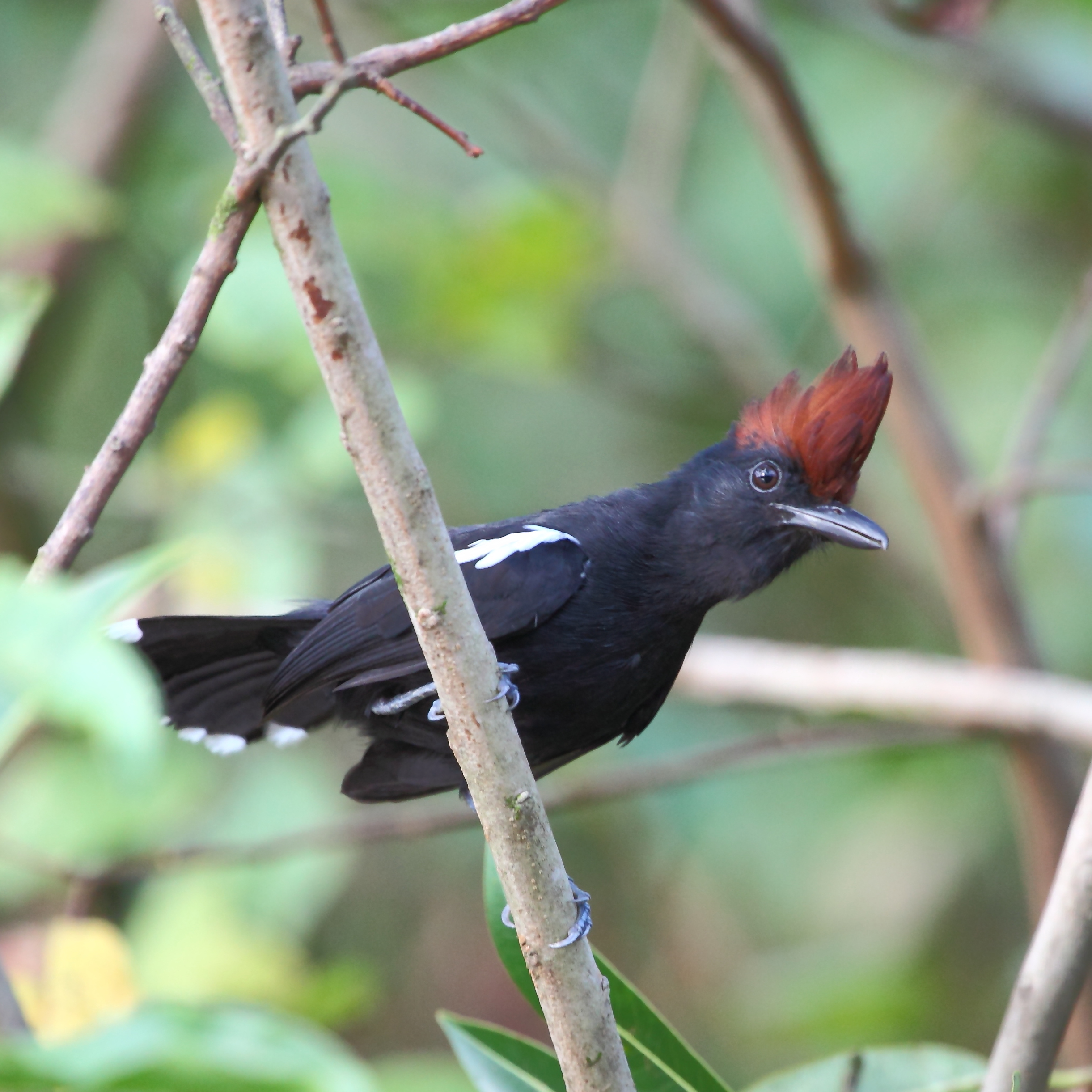
- Female at Apiacás river, Mato Grosso state, Brazil

Conservation status
- Least Concern (IUCN 3.1)

Scientific classification
- Kingdom: Animalia
- Phylum: Chordata
- Class: Aves
- Order: Passeriformes
- Family: Thamnophilidae
- Genus: Sakesphorus
- Species: S. luctuosus

Binomial name
- Sakesphorus luctuosus (Lichtenstein, MHC, 1823)

= Glossy antshrike =

Species of bird

The glossy antshrike (Sakesphorus luctuosus) is a species of bird in subfamily Thamnophilinae of family Thamnophilidae, the "typical antbirds". It is endemic to Brazil.

== Taxonomy and systematics ==
The glossy antshrike's taxonomy is unsettled. The Clements taxonomy assigns it two subspecies, the nominate S. l. luctuosus (Lichtenstein, MHC, 1823) and S. l. araguayae (Hellmayr, 1908). However, a study published in 2012 cast doubt on the separation, noting that the differences between the two appeared to be clinal. The International Ornithological Committee and BirdLife International's Handbook of the Birds of the World follow that assertion and treat the glossy antshrike as monotypic. The 2012 study did identify a population within the species that might warrant treatment as a separate species S. hagmanni.

This article follows the monotypic model.

== Description ==
The glossy antshrike is about 17 cm (6.7 in) long and weighs 27 to 33 g (0.95 to 1.2 oz). This species exhibits minor sexual dimorphism, and both sexes have a shaggy crest. Adult males are almost entirely black. Their lower back, rump, lower belly, and crissum are dark gray. Some white is mostly concealed under their scapulars and the tips of their tail feathers are white. The amount of white varies somewhat across the species' range. Adult females are almost like males but with a deep chestnut-brown forehead and crest. Subadult males resemble adult females with usually some black in the crest.

== Distribution and habitat ==
The glossy antshrike is found throughout much of the Brazilian Amazon Basin, generally along the main Amazon river and its southern tributaries. It range is roughly bounded in the northwest by east-central Amazonas, in the northeast by Pará and Tocantins, in the southwest by northeastern Rondônia, and in the south and southeast by southeastern Mato Grosso and Goiás. It inhabits forest and woodlands along rivers and smaller watercourses, mainly in igapó and várzea but also in areas that seldom flood. It occurs locally on islands within the larger rivers. It tends to favor forest understorey to mid-storey that is heavy with shrubs and vines. In elevation it ranges from sea level to about 250 m (800 ft).

== Behavior ==
=== Movement ===
The glossy antshrike is presumed to be a year-round resident throughout its range.

=== Feeding ===
The glossy antshrike feeds on a wide variety of insects and other arthropods. It forages singly or in pairs and only occasionally joins mixed-species feeding flocks. It typically feeds from the ground up to about 15 m (50 ft) above it. It hops through dense vegetation, gleaning prey from leaves, stems, vines, and branches by reaching and sometimes making short upward jumps from a perch. It has been observed dropping to the ground to capture prey.

=== Breeding ===
The only known nest of a glossy antshrike was found in December; it contained nestlings. It was a "pendant bag" made of plant fibers and a few leaves suspended at the top of a tree about 3 m (10 ft) above the ground. The tree was the only one on a small river island. Both parents provisioned the nestlings. The incubation period, time to fledging, and other details of parental care are not known.

=== Vocalization ===
The glossy antshrike's song is a "short, accelerating series of 10-15 high, nasal 'ah' notes". It also makes "a slowly repeated series of downslurred whistles", "soft and raspy 'caw' notes". a "long downslurred whistle", and a "shorter downslurred whistle that immediately becomes a short rattle".

== Status ==
The IUCN has assessed the glossy antshrike as being of Least Concern. It has a very large range; its population size is not known and is believed to be decreasing. No immediate threats have been identified. It is considered generally common. There is much suitable habitat in its range, some of which is protected in private preserves and state and national parks. "Reliance on flooded-forest habitat makes this species less prone to disturbance, and its ability to colonize adjacent disturbed second-growth thickets suggests a low sensitivity."
