= Vitreorana castroviejoi =

Conservation status
- Endangered (IUCN 3.1)

Scientific classification
- Kingdom: Animalia
- Phylum: Chordata
- Class: Amphibia
- Order: Anura
- Family: Centrolenidae
- Genus: Vitreorana
- Species: V. castroviejoi

Binomial name
- Vitreorana castroviejoi (Señaris and Ayarzagüena, 1997)

Synonyms
- Cochranella castroviejoi Señaris and Ayarzaguena, 1997 "1996"

Species of frog

Vitreorana castroviejoi is a species of frog in the family Centrolenidae. It is endemic to Cerro el Humo in the Paria Peninsula, Sucre state, northern Venezuela. It is locally known as ranita de cristal de Castroviejo ("Castroviejo's glass-frog"). The specific name castroviejoi honors Javier Castroviejo Bolívar, a Spanish zoologist.

== Description ==
Adult males measure 22–24 mm (0.9–0.9 in) and adult females 24–25 mm (0.9–1.0 in) in snout–vent length. The snout is short and truncated. The tympanum is distinct. The finger and toe tips bear small discs. The fingers are slightly webbed whereas the toes have well-developed webbing. Dorsal skin is finely granular. The dorsum is dark-green with purplish tones and light yellowish–greenish flecks. The flanks are transparent, as is the posterior part of the ventrum; the anterior part is white. The iris is greenish-gray.

== Habitat and conservation ==
Vitreorana castroviejoi inhabits cloud forests at elevations of 580–800 m (1,900–2,620 ft) above sea level. It is found in vegetation next to and overhanging cascading mountain streams. The eggs are laid on the upper side of the leaves. After hatching, the tadpoles fall into the streams, where they develop further.

Vitreorana castroviejoi is common in the rainy season. Its habitat is threatened bu agricultural development, selective logging, and infrastructure development for tourism. It occurs in the Península de Paria National Park.
