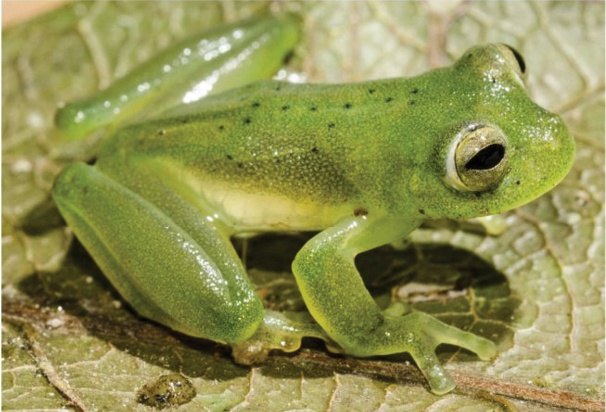

Conservation status
- Least Concern (IUCN 3.1)

Scientific classification
- Kingdom: Animalia
- Phylum: Chordata
- Class: Amphibia
- Order: Anura
- Family: Centrolenidae
- Genus: Vitreorana
- Species: V. ritae

Binomial name
- Vitreorana ritae (Lutz, 1952)

Synonyms
- Centrolene ritae Lutz in Lutz and Kloss, 1952; Cochranella ritae (Lutz, 1952); Centrolenella ritae (Lutz, 1952); Centrolenella oyampiensis Lescure, 1975; Centrolenella oyampiensis Lescure, 1975; Cochranella oyampiensis (Lescure, 1975); Vitreorana oyampiensis (Lescure, 1975); Centrolenella ametarsia Flores, 1987; Cochranella ametarsia (Flores, 1987); Centrolenella ametarsia Flores, 1987

= Vitreorana ritae =

Species of frog

Vitreorana ritae is a species of frog in the glass frog family (Centrolenidae). It is found in Amazonian Brazil, Colombia, Ecuador, and Peru, and in southern Guyana, eastern Suriname, and French Guiana. Its natural habitats are tropical moist lowland forests and rivers. It is threatened by habitat loss.

Formerly, this species was considered to be distinct from Vitreorana oyampiensis, but now the two populations are considered as conspecific.

== Description ==
Vitreorana ritae is a tiny glass frog that lacks humeral spines in males and has a lobed liver. Adult males measure 17–21 mm (0.67–0.83 in) from the snout to the vent, while the females are a bit larger at about 19.5–24.5 mm (0.77–0.96 in) snout-vent length. Its snout tip is neatly rounded. The translucent eardrum is visible but not large, measuring about one-fourth to one-third of the eye's diameter; the tympanic annulus is not hidden except for the dorsal margin which is covered by the supratympanic fold.

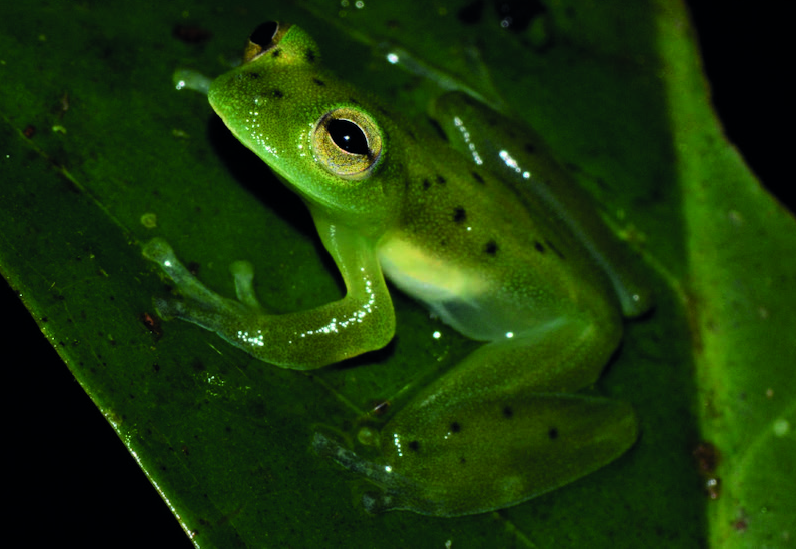
Amapá, Brazil

Their color looks pale green above, but in fact this is much due to their green skeleton being visible through the weakly pigmented skin. This species has many clear and fine blackish spots decorating its upperside, which may appear as if they were suspended a bit above the greenish background in very weakly pigmented specimens. Helena's glass frog, V. helenae on the other hand has a more heavily pigmented yellowish-green upperside (but also the characteristic spots, which led to them being confused). The back has a smooth shagreen-like texture, while the entirely transparent belly skin has a grainy surface. The forward quarter to half of the parietal (outer) peritoneum is white, while the rest is transparent, allowing to see the frog's interior. The pericardium and the inner peritoneum covering the gastrointestinal tract are white, while the inner peritoneum protecting the brown lobes of the liver is also transparent except for the anterior tip (where some iridophores may be present). The iris is greyish white with a network of thin dark grey lines; in Helena's glass frog it is bright yellow. Melanophores are abundant on the dorsal surface of the two outer but absent on the two inner fingers. Preserved specimens are lavender above, with the dark spotting remaining unchanged; the white iridophores of the viscera can dissolve in preserved specimens.

The dentigerous process of the vomer carries one tooth at most; it can be entirely toothless. The males have a type-I nuptial pad; the prepollex stands out at the base of the first finger. The toes and the outer two fingers of V. ritae are webbed; the first two fingers (of which the first is a bit longer) are completely free. The webbing formula for the outer fingers is III (2^{−}-2^{1/3}) – (1^{+}-2^{−}) IV; for the toes, it is I 1 – (2^{−}-2) II (1-1^{+}) – (2-2^{1/4}) III (1^{+}-1^{1/2}) – 2^{+} IV (2-2^{1/3}) – 1 V.

The disc at the tip of the third finger is mid-sized, larger than the eardrum but less than half the diameter of the eye. This species has tubercles on the thighs below the vent, but only low folds with no iridophores on the ulna and inner tarsus.

== Ecology ==
Its natural habitats are tropical moist lowland forests and rivers; it is usually found in riparian vegetation. Occurring at elevations below 1,000 m (3,300 ft) ASL; it is apparently also absent from the coastlands up to some dozen meters above sea level. The calls of this species have supposedly been described at least twice, but it is not clear whether they are actually of V. ritae; one description appears to be of C. midas calls instead. The other notes that the males call sitting on the upperside of leaves, usually giving very brief (0.10–0.15 seconds) calls that are loudest around 4640–5160 Hz singly or doubly, but apparently never three in a row – Helena's glass frog (V. helenae) gives double or triple but apparently never single calls. It is unknown if and how the males physically fight for females. The clutches are deposited on either side of leaves above small streams; after hatching the tadpoles drop into the water. Other aspects of its reproduction, as well as its tadpoles, remain undescribed as of 2008. Though tiny and inconspicuous, it is not considered a particularly rare species. With a considerable range including several protected areas and apparently able to live in secondary forest and tolerate some amount of human use of its habitat, it is not considered threatened by the IUCN.

== Systematics and taxonomy ==
This frog has a complicated taxonomic history: it was initially described in the genus Centrolenella, which is nowadays included in Centrolene. In 2009, it was transferred further to Vitreorana.

In 2008, it was found to include that the frogs that had been described as Centrolenella ametarsia are indistinguishable from the present species. The holotype of this species is specimen MNHNP 1973.1673, that of C. ametarsia is specimen MCZ A96522.

In 2013, Vitreorana oyampiensis was formally synonymized with Vitreorana ritae.
