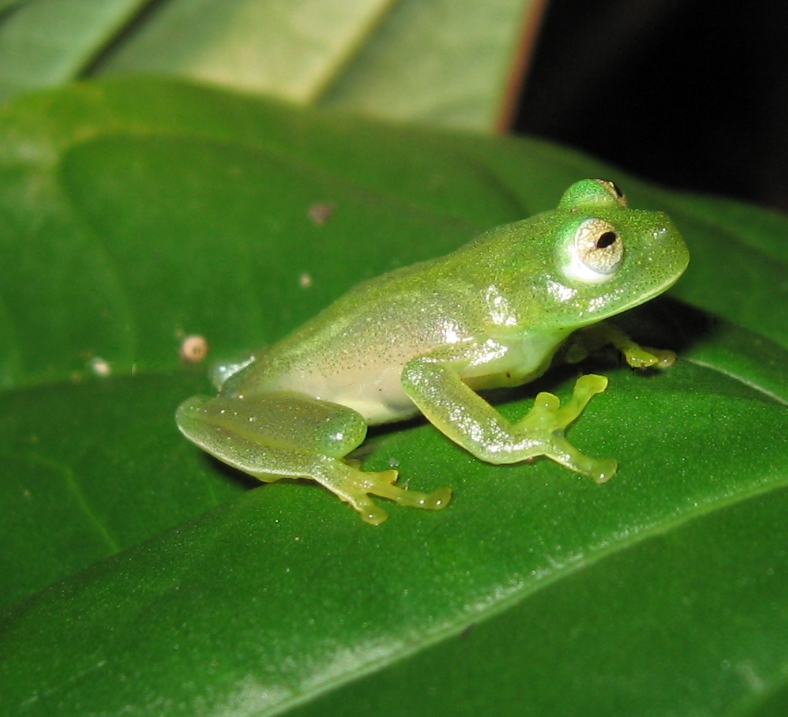
- Vitreorana eurygnatha

Scientific classification
- Kingdom: Animalia
- Phylum: Chordata
- Class: Amphibia
- Order: Anura
- Family: Centrolenidae
- Subfamily: Centroleninae
- Genus: Vitreorana (Guayasamin, Castroviejo-Fisher, Trueb, Ayarzagüena, Rada, and Vilà, 2009)

Type species
- Centrolenella antisthenesi (Goin, 1963)

Diversity
- 9 species (see text)

= Vitreorana =

Genus of amphibians

Vitreorana is a genus of glass frogs that are native to South America, from the Atlantic Forest of Brazil and Argentina to the Amazon rainforest of Colombia and Ecuador and to the Venezuelan Coastal Range and the Guianas. One way one can tell this type of glass frog from others is through their green bones, lavender-colored dorsal, and white highlighted pigment. This genus has also started to become endangered, especially in Brazil, where many Vitreorana, such as V. eurygnatha due to habitat loss.

== Species ==
The following species are recognised in the genus Vitreorana:

- Vitreorana antisthenesi (Goin, 1963)
- Vitreorana baliomma (Pontes, Caramaschi, and Pombal, 2014)
- Vitreorana castroviejoi (Ayarzagüena and Señaris, 1997)
- Vitreorana eurygnatha (Lutz, 1925)
- Vitreorana franciscana (Santana, Barros, Pontes, and Feio, 2015)
- Vitreorana gorzulae (Ayarzagüena, 1992)
- Vitreorana helenae (Ayarzagüena, 1992)
- Vitreorana parvula (Boulenger, 1895)
- Vitreorana ritae (Lutz, 1952)
- Vitreorana uranoscopa (Müller, 1924)
