= Vitreorana helenae =

Conservation status
- Vulnerable (IUCN 3.1)

Scientific classification
- Kingdom: Animalia
- Phylum: Chordata
- Class: Amphibia
- Order: Anura
- Family: Centrolenidae
- Genus: Vitreorana
- Species: V. helenae

Binomial name
- Vitreorana helenae (Ayarzagüena, 1992)

Synonyms
- Cochranella helenae (Ayarzagüena, 1992); Hyalinobatrachium helenae (Ayarzagüena, 1992)

Species of amphibian

Vitreorana helenae is a species of frog in the family Centrolenidae. Two common names are sometimes used to refer to this species: Venezuelan glass frog and Helena's glass frog. In Spanish, it is locally known as ranita de cristal de Helena.

Vitreorana helenae is found in Bolívar state in eastern Venezuela, and in the vicinity of Kaieteur National Park, Guyana. The Guyanese population that was believed to belong to V. oyampiensis is apparently of this species.

Its natural habitats are tropical moist lowland forests and rivers.
