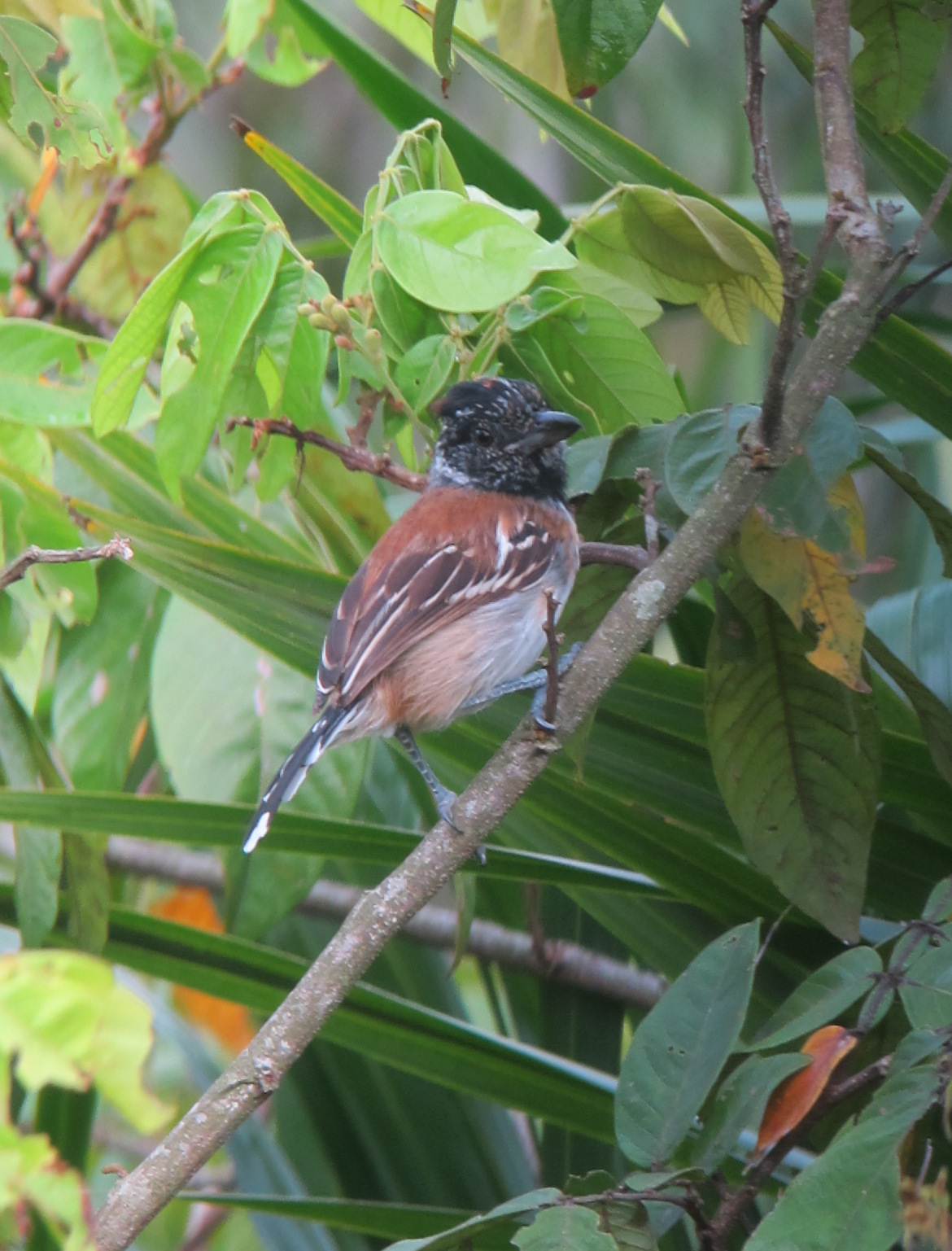
- Male

Conservation status
- Least Concern (IUCN 3.1)

- Least Concern (IUCN 3.1)

Scientific classification
- Kingdom: Animalia
- Phylum: Chordata
- Class: Aves
- Order: Passeriformes
- Family: Thamnophilidae
- Genus: Sakesphorus
- Species: S. canadensis

Binomial name
- Sakesphorus canadensis (Linnaeus, 1766)

Synonyms
- Lanius canadensis Linnaeus, 1766

= Black-crested antshrike =

Species of bird

The black-crested antshrike (Sakesphorus canadensis) is a passerine bird in subfamily Thamnophilinae of family Thamnophilidae, the "typical antbirds". It is found in tropical South America in Trinidad, Colombia, Venezuela, the Guianas, Brazil, and Peru.

== Taxonomy ==
In 1760 the French zoologist Mathurin Jacques Brisson included a description of the black-crested antshrike in his Ornithologie based on a specimen that he mistakenly believed had been collected in Canada. He used the French name La Pie-Griesche de Canada and the Latin name Lanius Canadensis. Although Brisson coined Latin names, these do not conform to the binomial system and are not recognized by the International Commission on Zoological Nomenclature. When in 1766 the Swedish naturalist Carl Linnaeus updated his Systema Naturae for the twelfth edition he added 240 species that had been previously described by Brisson in his Ornithologie. One of these was the black-crested antshrike. Linnaeus included a brief description, used the binomial name Lanius canadensis and cited Brisson's work. This species is now placed in the genus Sakesphorus that was erected by the British ornithologist Charles Chubb in 1918.

The black-crested antshrike's taxonomy is unsettled. The South American Classification Committee of the American Ornithological Society, the International Ornithological Committee, and the Clements taxonomy recognize these six subspecies:

- S. c. pulchellus (Cabanis & Heine, 1860)
- S. c. intermedius (Cherrie, 1916)
- S. c. fumosus Zimmer, JT, 1933
- S. c. trinitatis (Ridgway, 1891)
- S. c. canadensis (Linnaeus, 1766)
- S. c. loretoyacuensis (Bartlett, E, 1882)

However, BirdLife International's Handbook of the Birds of the World (HBW) treats S. c. pulchellus as a separate species, the "streak-fronted antshrike". Clements calls that taxon the "black-crested antshrike (streak-fronted)" within the species.

This article follows the one species, six subspecies, model.

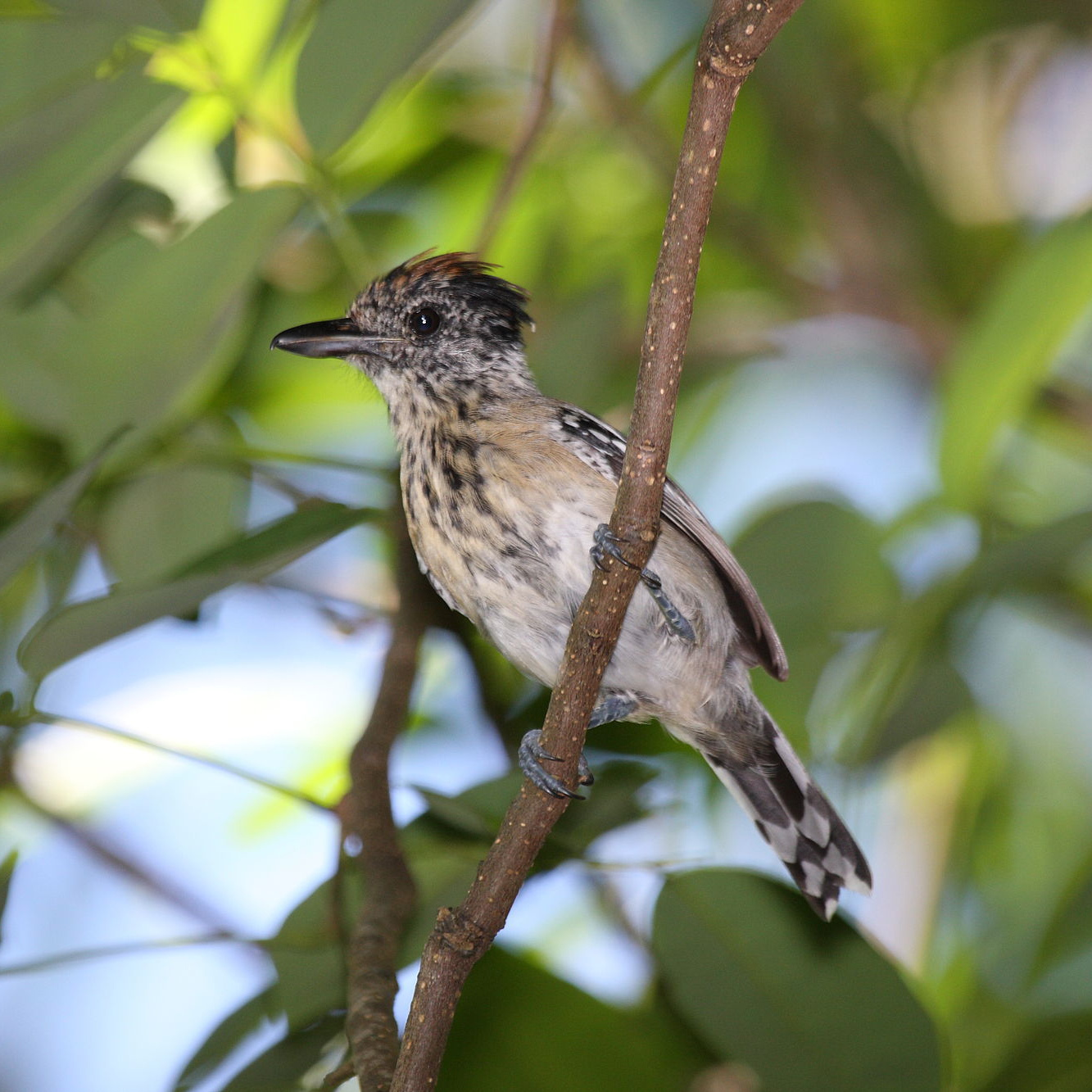
Female

== Description ==
The black-crested antshrike is 14 to 18 cm (5.5 to 7.1 in) long and weighs 20 to 28 g (0.71 to 0.99 oz). This species exhibits sexual dimorphism, but both sexes have a shaggy crest. Adult males of the nominate subspecies S. c. canadensis have a black head, throat, and center of their breast. They have a white band on their nape. Their upperparts are cinnamon-brown. Their wings and tail are black with white edges to the feathers and white spots at the tips of the outer tail feathers. The sides of their breast and their belly are whitish gray and their flanks and crissum a darker gray. Adult females have a rufous crown, a grayish face, and cinnamon nape and sides of their neck. Their upperparts are cinnamon-brown like the male's. Their wings and tail are brownish black with white edges on the flight feathers and white edges and tips on the tail feathers. Their throat is whitish, their breast cinnamon with blackish streaks, and their belly and crissum buff-tinged whitish. Subadult males resemble adult females.

The other subspecies of the black-crested antshrike differ from the nominate and each other thus:

- S. c. pulchellus: male compared to nominate has white streaks on the black crown and throat, a speckled black and white face, lighter pale cinnamon upperparts, and more white on the tail and underparts; female is a paler version of the nominate
- S. c. intermedius: very similar to nominate
- S. c. fumosus: generally darker than nominate; males have almost black upperparts, very little white on the nape, slate-gray underparts, and little white on the tail; females dark with heavy streaks on the breast
- S. c. trinitatis: very similar to nominate
- S. c. loretoyacuensis: much like fumosus except male's nape and underparts are almost like the nominate's

== Distribution and habitat ==
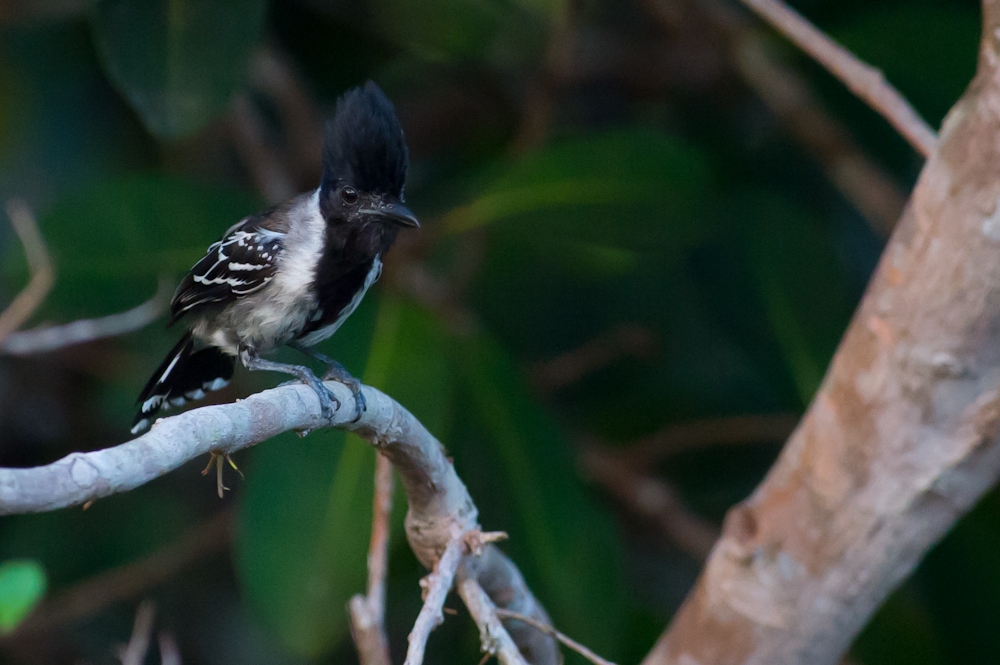
the sub-species S. c. loretoyacuensis

The black-crested antshrike has a disjunct distribution. The subspecies are found thus:

- S. c. pulchellus: Caribbean slope of northern Colombia from Chocó Department northeast into extreme northwestern Venezuela
- S. c. intermedius: eastern Colombia from Arauca to Vichada departments east through much of Venezuela and into the upper Branco River basin in northern Brazil
- S. c. fumosus: southern Amazonas state in southwestern Venezuela
- S. c. trinitatis: from Anzoátegui in northeastern Venezuela east into Guyana and also on Trinidad
- S. c. canadensis: Suriname and coastal French Guiana
- S. c. loretoyacuensis: extreme southeastern Colombia and along the Negro, lower Branco, and upper Amazon rivers in northwestern Brazil, and separately along the upper Amazon and lower Marañón and Ucayali rivers in northeastern Peru

The provenance of a specimen noted as being collected in southern Pará, Brazil, is disputed as there are no other records of the species that far south and east of the upper Amazon.

The "streak-fronted" pulchellus subspecies of the black-crested antshrike inhabits deciduous and savanna woodlands, gallery forest, and bushy areas in semi-arid regions. The other subspecies are found in those same habitats and also in the edges of igapó and várzea forest. It also occurs locally in mangroves and dune scrub near the Caribbean coast. All of the subspecies occur mostly in the understorey and mid-storey of the forest and also can be found in gardens and city parks. In elevation the species occurs as high as 900 m (3,000 ft) but only reaches 400 m (1,300 ft) in Colombia and 700 m (2,300 ft) in Venezuela.

== Behavior ==
=== Movement ===
The black-crested antshrike is presumed to be a year-round resident throughout its range.

=== Feeding ===
The black-crested antshrike feeds on a wide variety of insects and other arthropods and also includes small lizards and fruit in its diet. It forages singly or in pairs and sometimes joins mixed-species feeding flocks, and typically feeds from the ground up to about 15 m (50 ft) above it. It hops through dense vegetation, gleaning prey from leaves, stems, vines, and branches by reaching and sometimes making short upward jumps from a perch. It has been observed dropping to the ground to capture prey.

=== Breeding ===
The black-crested antshrike's breeding season varies geographically. In much of Colombia and Venezuela it spans from June to September, in Guyana March to May, in French Guyana December to July, on Trinidad May to July, and in Suriname at any time of year. The breeding season is undefined in Brazil and Peru. Its nest is a cup woven variously from grass and other plant and fungal fibers, and typically suspended in a branch fork. The usual clutch is two eggs. In Suriname one study noted an incubation period of 14 days. Both sexes brood and feed nestlings during the day; only the female broods them at night. The incubation period elsewhere, the time to fledging, and other details of parental care are not known.

=== Vocalization ===
The primary song of most black-crested anshrike subspecies is "a series of c. 10–15 notes, initially flat with complaining quality, then rising in pitch while accelerating rapidly". That of S. c. pulchellus is similar "but overall slower-paced and lower-pitched, while final 2–3 snarling notes drop further in pitch". Calls apparently do not vary across the species' range. They include "a complex downslurred note that sounds as if squeezed out", "abrupt 'chup' notes repeated often", and a "rattle call introduced by a long clear note".

== Status ==
The IUCN follows HBW taxonomy and so has separately assessed the "streak-fronted" and "black-crested" antshrikes. Both are of Least Concern and both have unknown population sizes that are believed to be decreasing. No immediate threats to either have been identified. The species is considered common throughout its range. Its non-specialized habitat requirements somewhat protect it from potential threats. "Some local populations, particularly those restricted to dry forest, may, however, prove more sensitive."
