= Vitreorana antisthenesi =

Conservation status
- Vulnerable (IUCN 3.1)

Scientific classification
- Kingdom: Animalia
- Phylum: Chordata
- Class: Amphibia
- Order: Anura
- Family: Centrolenidae
- Genus: Vitreorana
- Species: V. antisthenesi

Binomial name
- Vitreorana antisthenesi (Goin, 1963)

Synonyms
- Centrolenella antisthenesi Goin, 1963; Hyalinobatrachium antisthenesi (Goin, 1963); Cochranella antisthenesi (Goin, 1963)

Species of amphibian

Vitreorana antisthenesi is a species of frog in the family Centrolenidae. It is endemic to northern Venezuela and is known from the Venezuelan Coastal Range. Common name Aragua glass frog has been coined for it.

The systematic position of this species has changed many times. It was originally described under the genus Centrolenella (a genus now synonym of Centrolene) in 1963. It was later changed to the genus Hyalinobatrachium in 1991 and to Cochranella in 2006, before ending up in its current placement in the genus Vitreorana.

This species occurs in cloud forests and gallery forests at elevations between 220 and 1,200 m (720 and 3,940 ft) above sea level. The eggs are laid on leaves overhanging streams. It is main threat is probably habitat loss caused by smallholder farming, logging, burning, and human settlements.
