= Vitreorana gorzulae =

Conservation status
- Least Concern (IUCN 3.1)

Scientific classification
- Kingdom: Animalia
- Phylum: Chordata
- Class: Amphibia
- Order: Anura
- Family: Centrolenidae
- Genus: Vitreorana
- Species: V. gorzulae

Binomial name
- Vitreorana gorzulae (Ayarzagüena, 1992)

Synonyms
- Centrolenella gorzulae Ayarzagüena, 1992; Centrolene gorzulai (Ayarzagüena, 1992); Centrolene papillahallicum Noonan and Harvey, 2000; Centrolene lema Duellman and Señaris, 2003; Hyalinobatrachium auyantepuianum (Señaris & Ayarzagüena, 1994)

Species of frog

Vitreorana gorzulae (Bolivar giant glass frog) is a species of frog in the family Centrolenidae. It is found in Bolívar state in Venezuela and in Guyana. In Spanish it is known as ranita de cristal de Gorzula. Its natural habitats are subtropical or tropical moist montane forests, rivers, and intermittent rivers.
