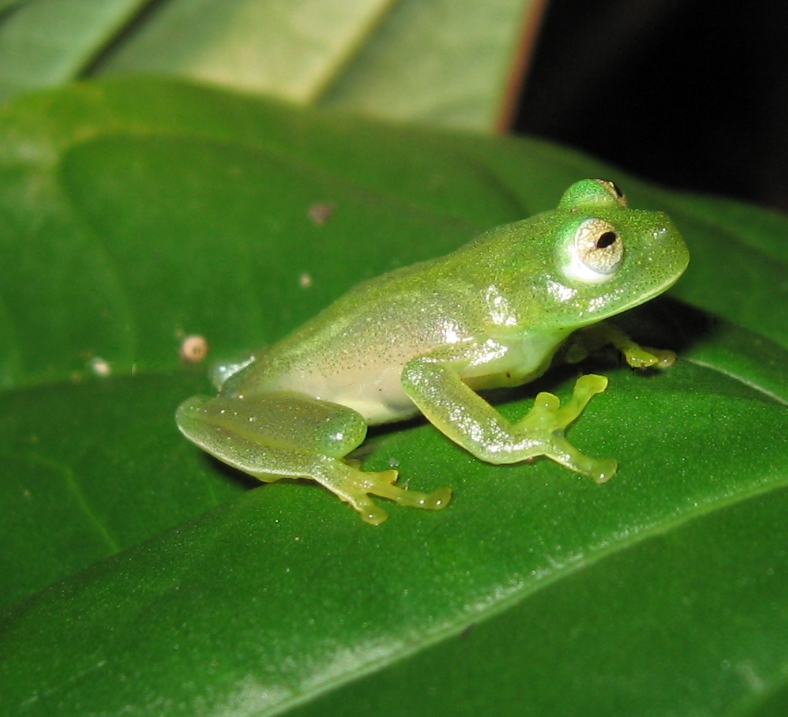

Conservation status
- Least Concern (IUCN 3.1)

Scientific classification
- Kingdom: Animalia
- Phylum: Chordata
- Class: Amphibia
- Order: Anura
- Family: Centrolenidae
- Genus: Vitreorana
- Species: V. eurygnatha

Binomial name
- Vitreorana eurygnatha (Lutz, 1925)

Synonyms
- Hyalinobatrachium eurygnathum (Lutz, 1925)

= Vitreorana eurygnatha =

Species of frog

Vitreorana eurygnatha is a species of frog in the family Centrolenidae. It is endemic to Brazil. Its natural habitats are subtropical or tropical moist lowland forests, subtropical or tropical moist montane forests, and rivers. It is threatened by habitat loss.
