= Seasonal semideciduous forest =

Type of forest

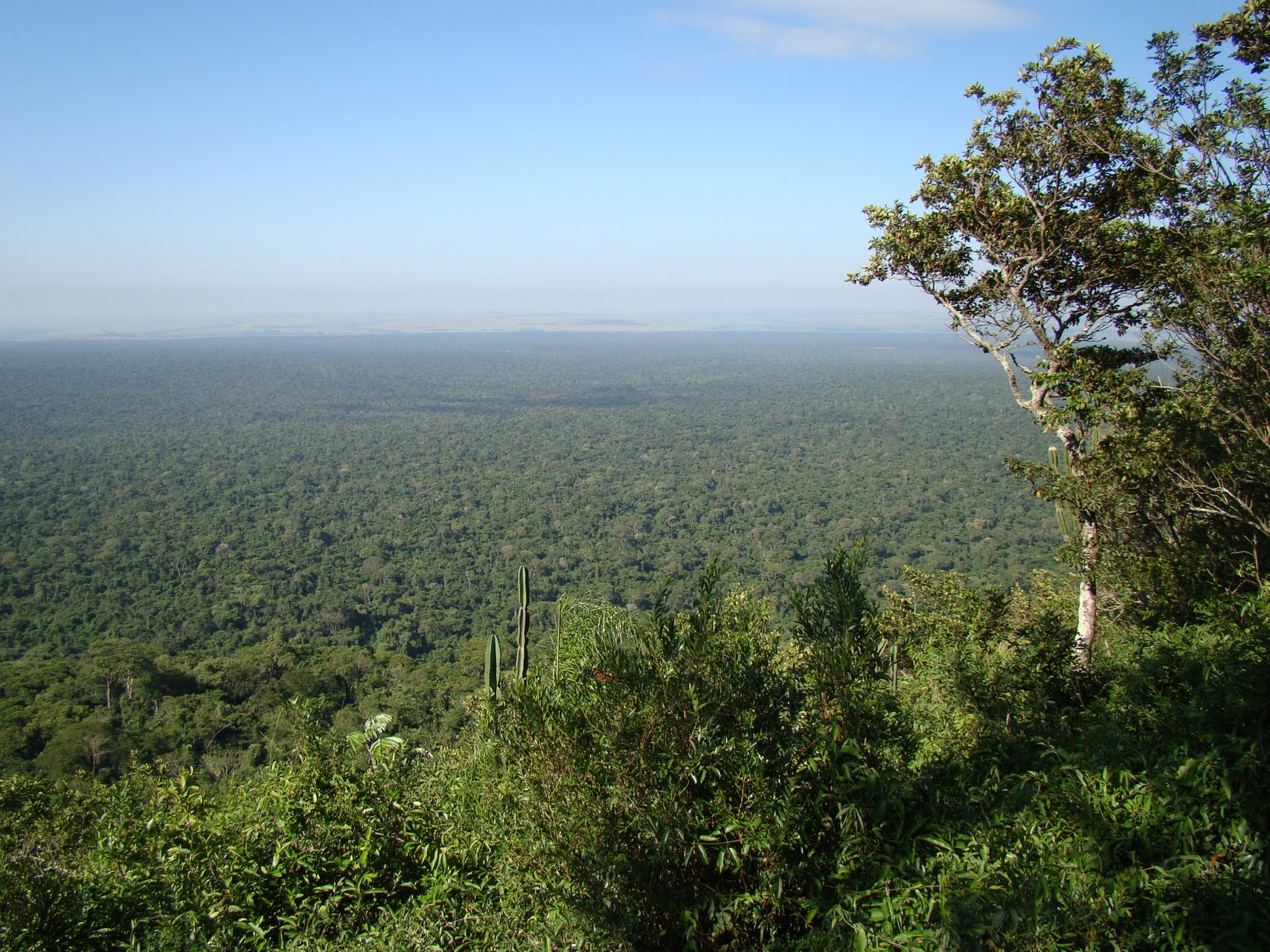
Aerial view of the seasonal semideciduous forest in Morro do Diabo State Park, São Paulo.

The seasonal semideciduous forest is a vegetation type that belongs to the Atlantic Forest biome (Inland Atlantic Forest), but is also found occasionally in the Cerrado. Typical of central Brazil, it is caused by a double climatic seasonality: a season of intense summer rains followed by a period of drought. It is composed of phanerophytes with leaf buds that are protected from drought by scales (cataphylls or hairs), having deciduous sclerophyllous or membranaceous adult leaves. The degree of deciduousness, i.e. leaf loss, is dependent on the intensity and duration of basically two reasons: minimum and maximum temperatures and water balance deficiency. The percentage of deciduous trees in the forest as a whole is 20-50%.

The vegetation is located in the north and west of Paraná, region of the third plateau, where it presents different types of soil. It is also widely distributed in the southern portion of Mato Grosso do Sul, interspersed between fields up to the 21st parallel, where it appears in riparian forests, being called alluvial seasonal semideciduous forest.

== Terminology ==
According to Rodrigues (1999), the seasonal semideciduous forest (IBGE, 1993) corresponds approximately to the following designations:

- subtropical rain forest (Wettstein, 1904);
- inland rain forests (Campos, 1912);
- tropical semideciduous broadleaved forest (Kuhlmann, 1956);
- tropical seasonal rain forest of the south-central plateau (Veloso, 1962);
- mesophytic semideciduous forest (Rizzini, 1963);
- sub-caducifolia or tropical seasonal forest (Andrade-Lima, 1966);
- semideciduous plateau forest (Eiten, 1970);
- subtropical foliated forests (Hueck, 1972);
- submontane seasonal semideciduous forest (Veloso and Góes Filho, 1982);
- semideciduous latifolia forest or plateau forest (Leitão Filho, 1982);
- Mata de Cipó.

== Categories ==
There is an IBGE (2012) altimetric division to delimit study regions, which is:

- alluvial seasonal semideciduous forest: most frequent in the Pantanal;
- lowland seasonal semideciduous forest: from Rio Grande do Norte to Rio de Janeiro, characterized by the African genus Caesalpinia, including the brazilwood tree;
- submontane seasonal semideciduous forest: from Espírito Santo to Paraná, entering the inland states, on the plateaus and in the Mantiqueira and Órgãos mountains;
- montane seasonal semideciduous forest: small area in Itatiaia and Roraima;

Some authors also indicate a fifth type, the coastal seasonal semideciduous forest (or Mata dos Tabuleiros), present along the east coast of Brazil, mainly between the states of Bahia and Rio de Janeiro.

== Flora ==
Main Amazonian genera of Brazilian origin are:

- Astronium
- Cariniana
- Lecythis
- Parapiptadenia
- Peltophorum

== Preservation ==
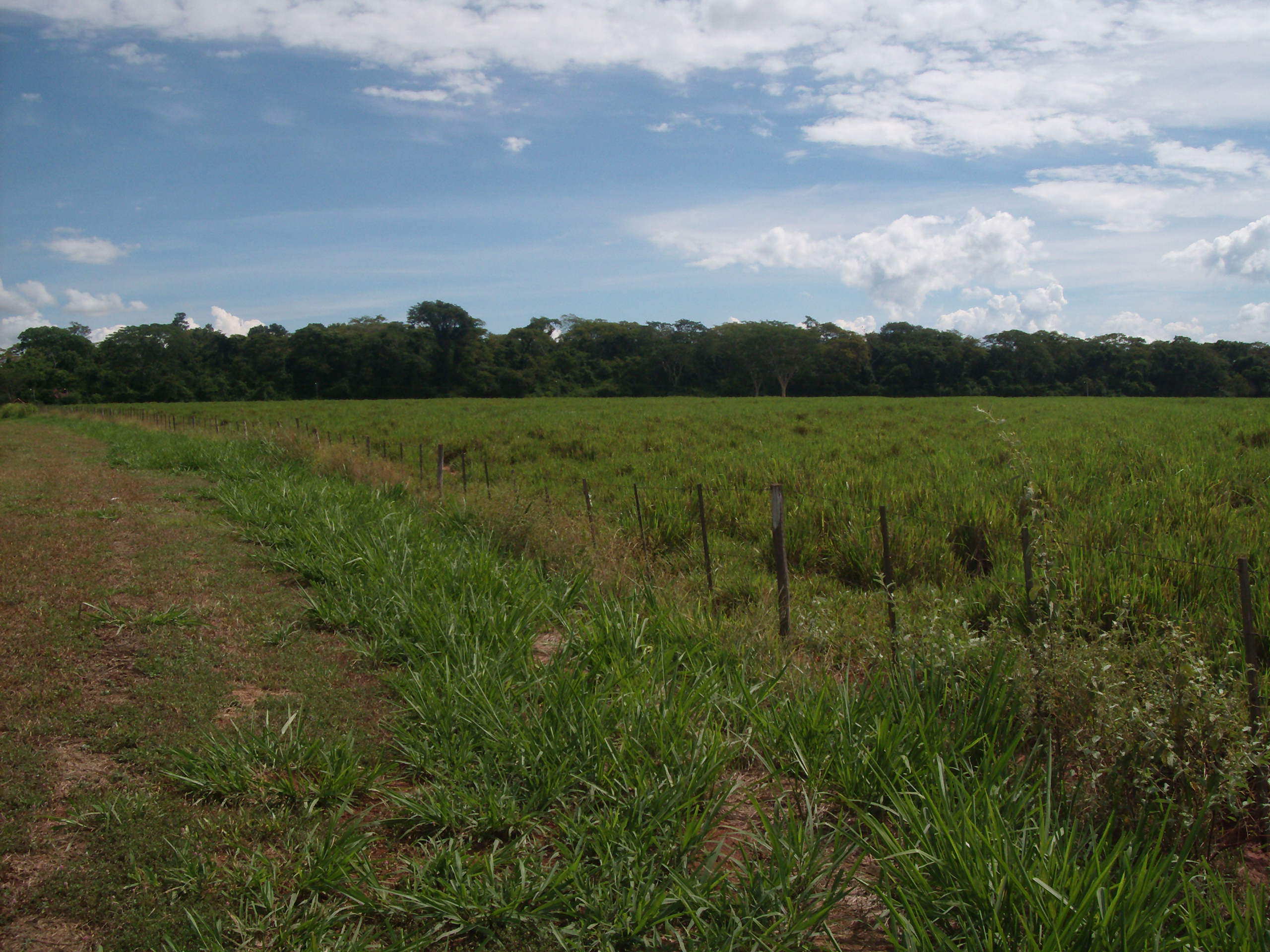
Side view, in the background, of a remnant of Interior Atlantic Forest in Santa Fé do Sul, São Paulo.

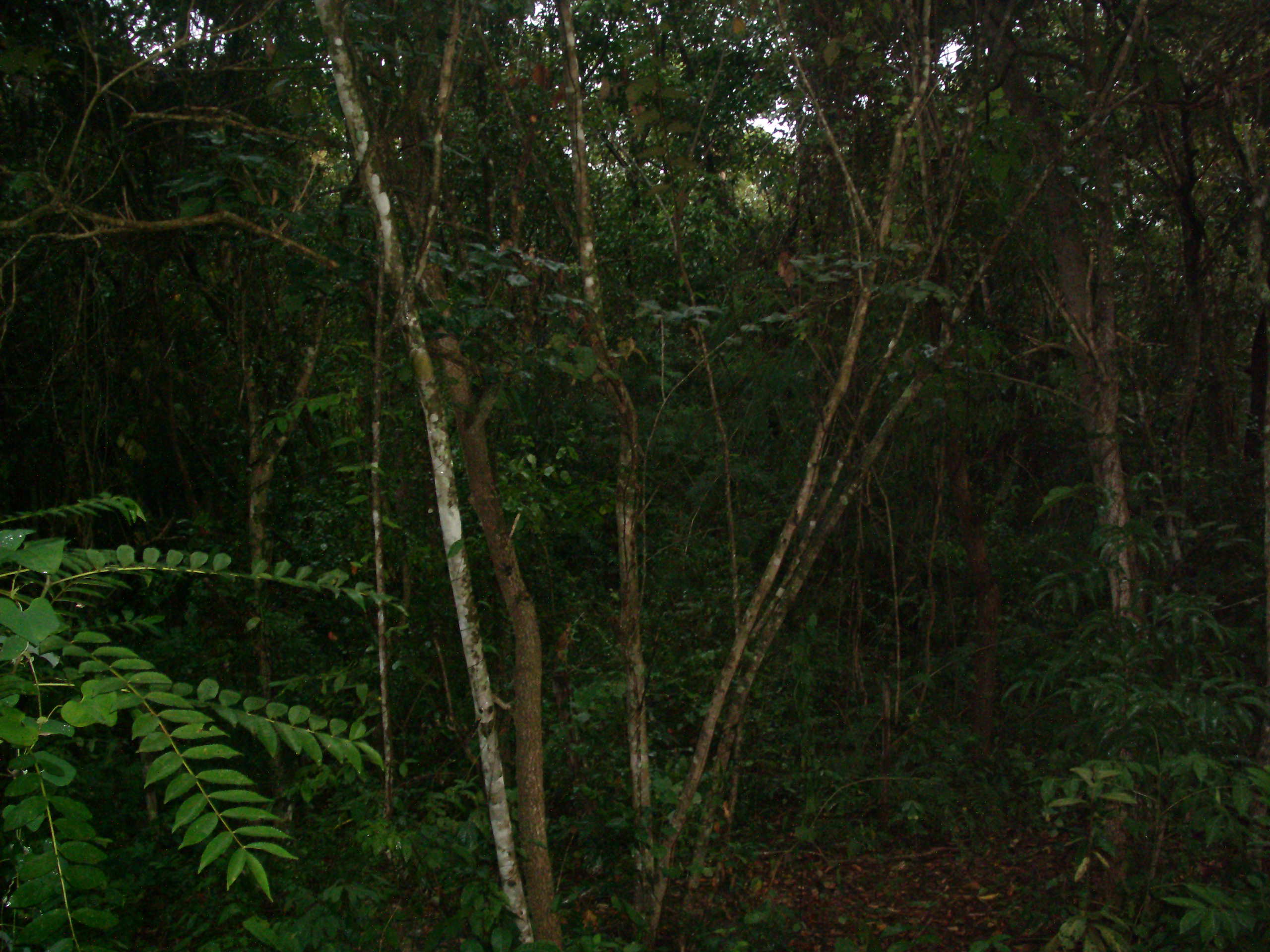
Interior of the forest, Santa Fé do Sul, São Paulo.

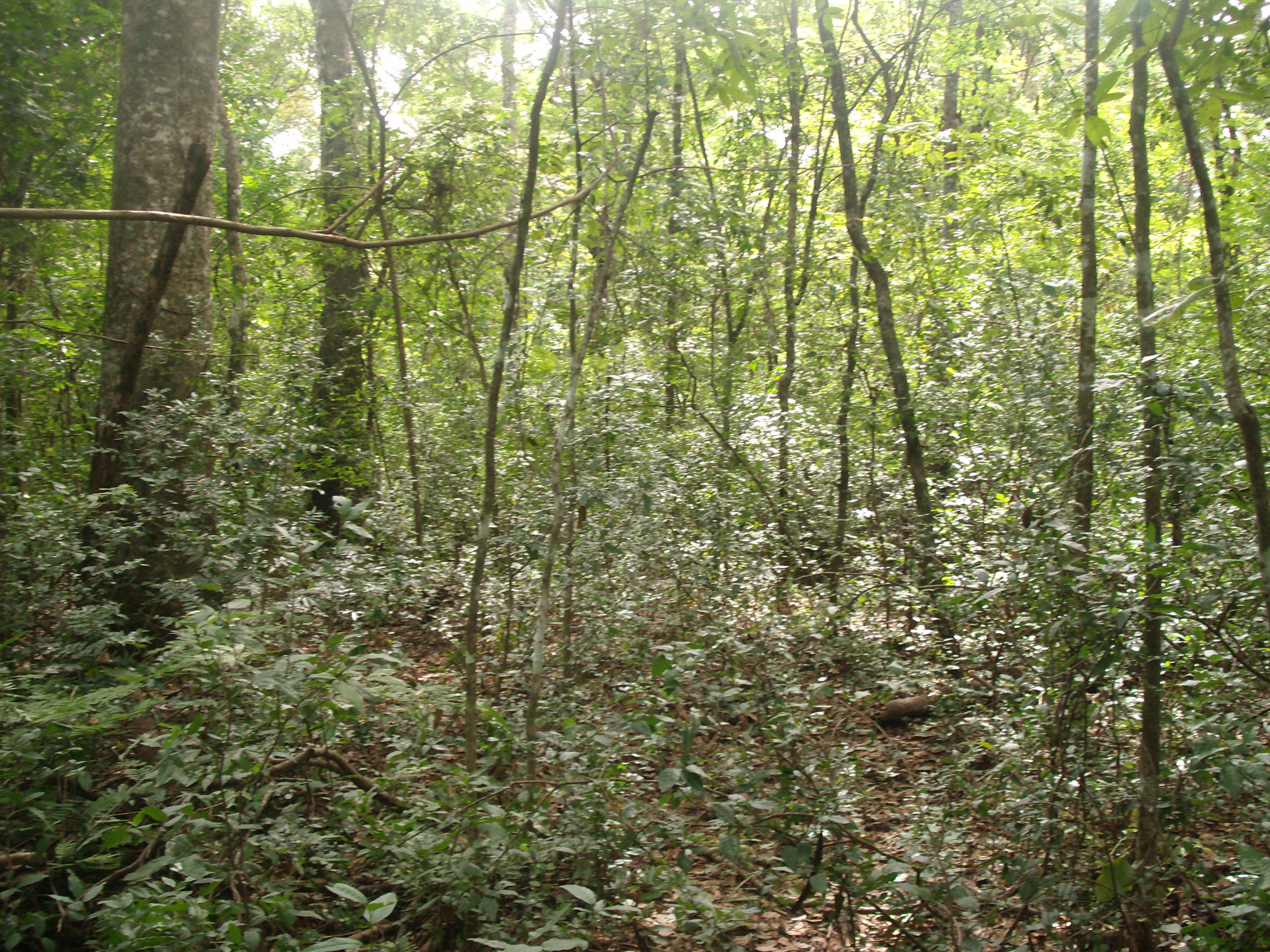
Interior of the forest, Santa Fé do Sul, São Paulo.

The Inland Atlantic Forest is one of the ecoregions of the Atlantic Forest that is in the worst state of conservation. The largest tract (about 471,204 km^{2}) of seasonal semideciduous forest was part of the Alto Paraná Atlantic Forests (or Selva Paranaense) ecoregion. It extended from northwestern São Paulo to southeastern Paraguay and the Argentine province of Misiones. In Brazil, only 2.7% (about 7,716 km^{2}) of the original vegetation cover remains, which can be found in Morro do Diabo State Park, Iguaçu National Park and Turvo State Park, its largest well-preserved tracts. Most of the remaining forest is located in the province of Misiones, with about 11,230 km^{2}. In Paraguay, there are 11,523 km^{2}, which represent only 13.5% of the original coverage.

In Brazil, the situation is more critical. For a fragment to be considered large and to harbour significant species of the biome, such as large mammals (like the jaguar), it needs to be at least 10,000 hectares (100 km^{2}). In the interior of São Paulo, the only fragment that has an area larger than this is the Morro do Diabo State Park. In the state of Rio Grande do Sul, this type of vegetation has been reduced by 4.26% (about 2,102.75 km^{2}) of its original coverage.

== See also ==
- Seasonal tropical forest
