= Morros de Macaira Natural Monument =

Morros de Macaira Natural Monument Monumento Natural Morros de Macaira
- IUCN category III (natural monument or feature)
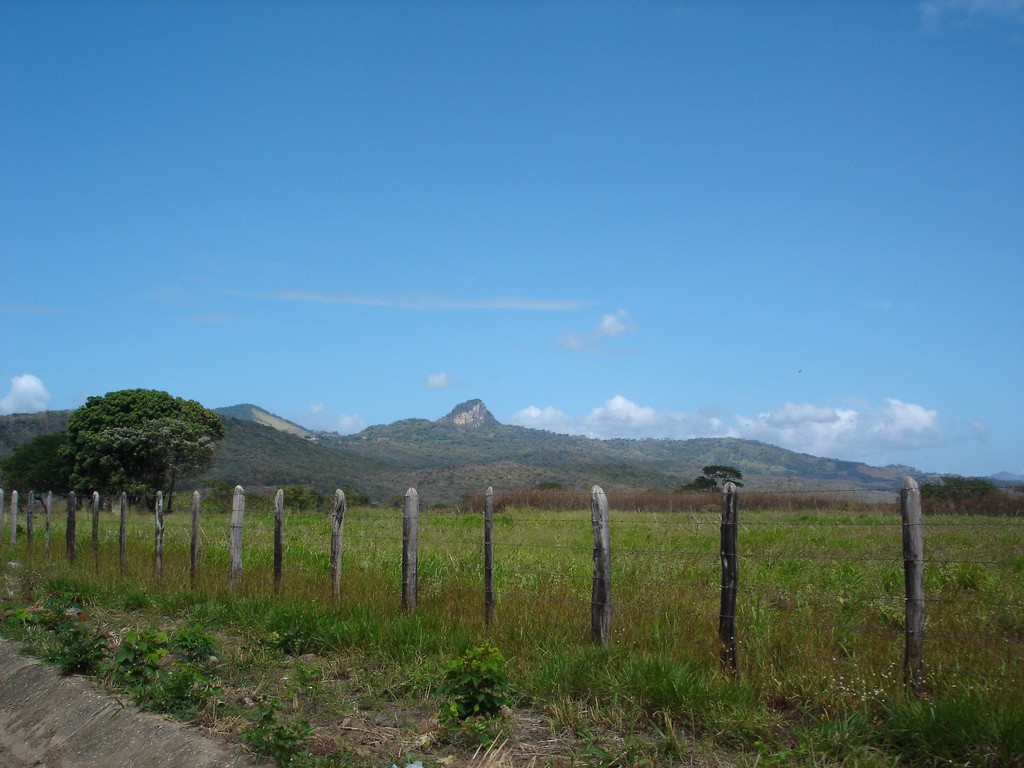

- Location within Venezuela
- Location: Venezuela
- Coordinates: 9°52′N 66°38′W
- Area: 0.99 km^{2} (0.38 sq mi)
- Established: December 12, 1978

The Morros de Macaira Natural Monument (Spanish: Monumento Natural Morros de Macaira) Is a protected area with status of natural monument located to the north of Guárico State, part of the South American country of Venezuela. It was created in 1978. It covers an area of 99 ha. Throughout the region, it is common to find limestone rock masses, caves grooved with small water courses and deep vertical tops.

The Morros de Macaira Natural Monument is located in the municipality of José Tadeo Monagas. The western boundary of the monument is determined by the road that connects Altagracia de Orituco with San Francisco de Macaira.

Its main attraction is the calcareous formation of great paleontological and environmental value. It is constituted by three massifs, which lodge numerous caves crossed by fluvial torrents.

The vegetation is composed mainly of semideciduous forests and semideciduous thickets in the montane forest region of the mountain range of the coast of Venezuela.

== See also ==
- List of national parks of Venezuela
- Laguna de Las Marites Natural Monument
