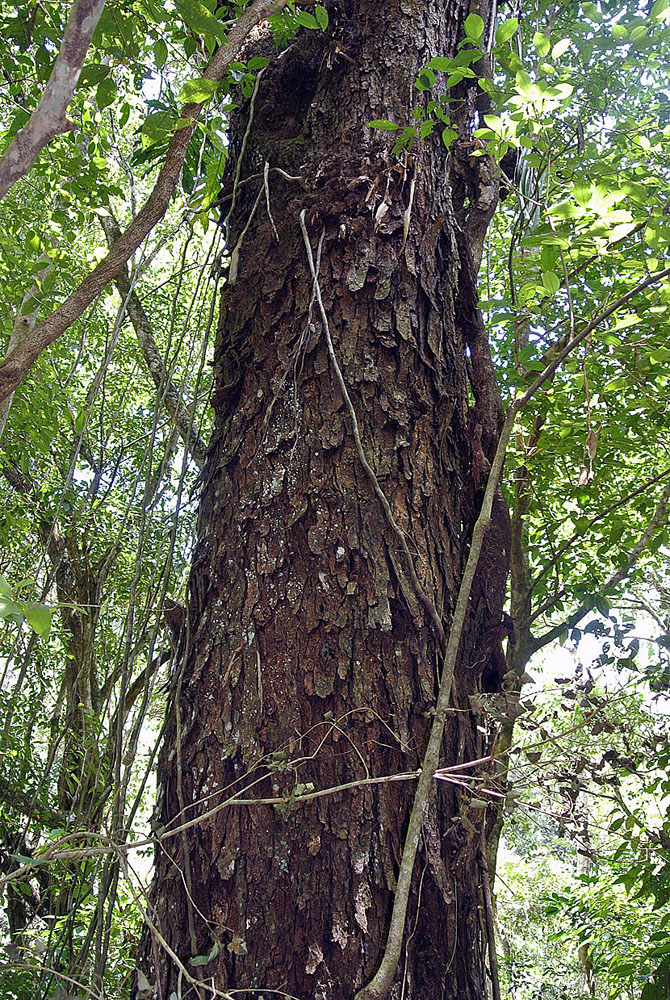
- Parapiptadenia rigida

Scientific classification
- Kingdom: Plantae
- Clade: Tracheophytes
- Clade: Angiosperms
- Clade: Eudicots
- Clade: Rosids
- Order: Fabales
- Family: Fabaceae
- Subfamily: Caesalpinioideae
- Clade: Mimosoid clade
- Genus: Parapiptadenia; Brenan (1963)

Species
- 6; see text

Synonyms
- Piptadenia Benth. (1841), nom. illeg.

= Parapiptadenia =

Genus of legumes

Parapiptadenia is a genus of flowering plants in the family Fabaceae. It includes six species of trees and shrubs native to eastern and southern Brazil, Bolivia, Paraguay, Uruguay, and northern Argentina. Typical habitats include tropical coastal and dune forest (restinga), woodland, scrub, and secondary growth forest. It belongs to the mimosoid clade of the subfamily Caesalpinioideae.

== Species ==
Six species are accepted:

- Parapiptadenia blanchetii (Benth.) Vaz & M.P.Lima
- Parapiptadenia excelsa (Griseb.) Burkart
- Parapiptadenia ilheusana G.P.Lewis
- Parapiptadenia pterosperma (Benth.) Brenan
- Parapiptadenia rigida (Benth.) Brenan
- Parapiptadenia zehntneri (Harms) M.P.Lima & H.C.Lima
