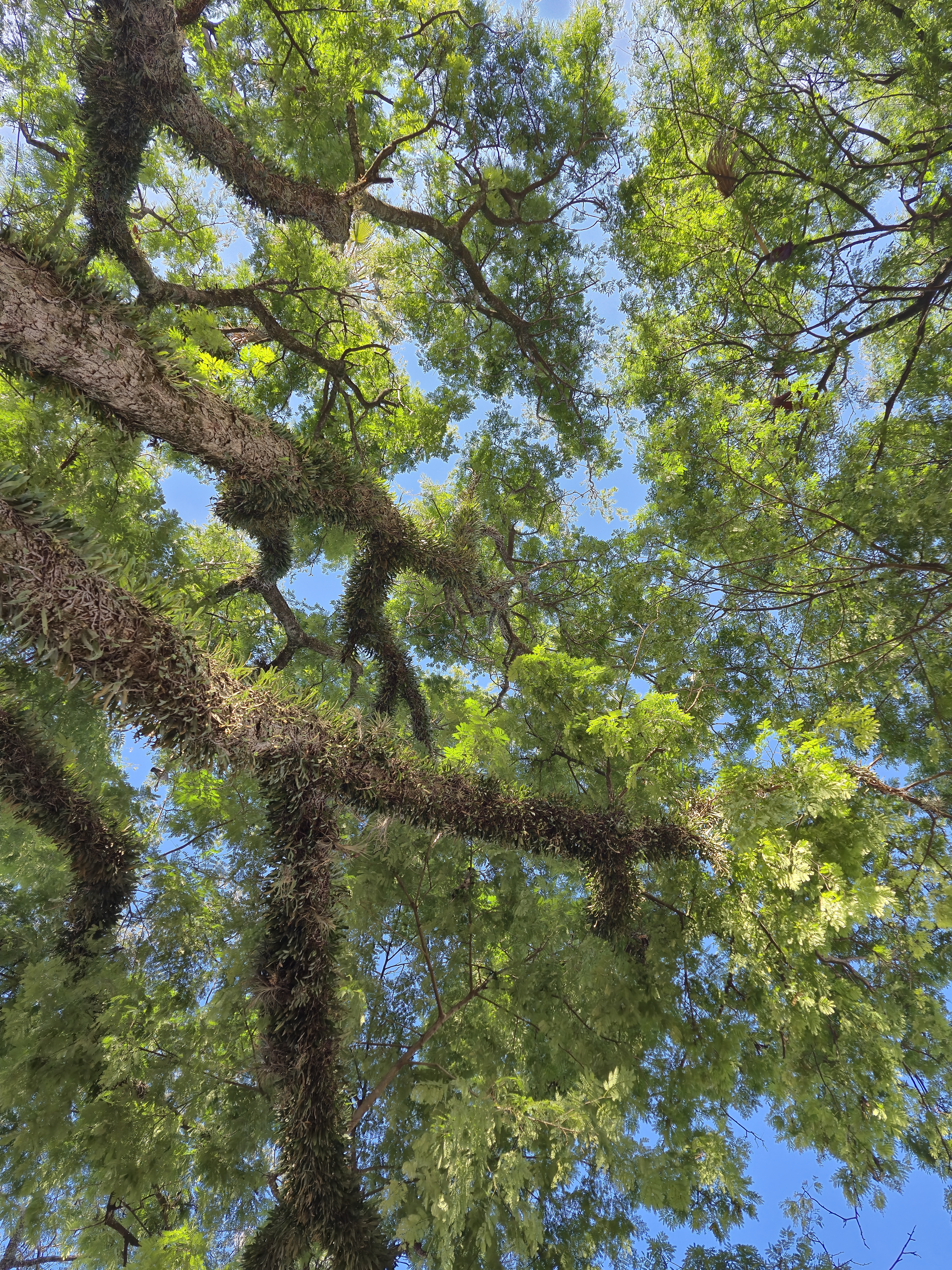
- Tree in Brazil

Scientific classification
- Kingdom: Plantae
- Clade: Tracheophytes
- Clade: Angiosperms
- Clade: Eudicots
- Clade: Rosids
- Order: Fabales
- Family: Fabaceae
- Subfamily: Caesalpinioideae
- Clade: Mimosoid clade
- Genus: Parapiptadenia
- Species: P. rigida

Binomial name
- Parapiptadenia rigida (Benth.)Brenan
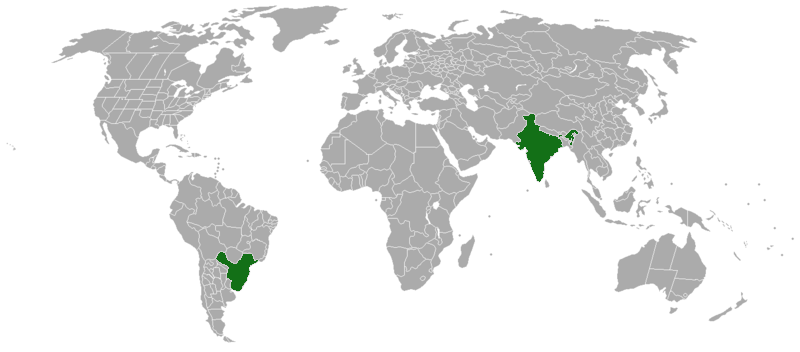
- Range of Parapiptadenia rigida

Synonyms
- Piptadenia rigida Benth.; Piptadenia rigida var. grandis Lindm.; Piptadenia rigida var. typica Lindm.; Prosopis elegans Spreng.; Senegalia angico (Mart.) Seigler & Ebinger

= Parapiptadenia rigida =

Species of tree

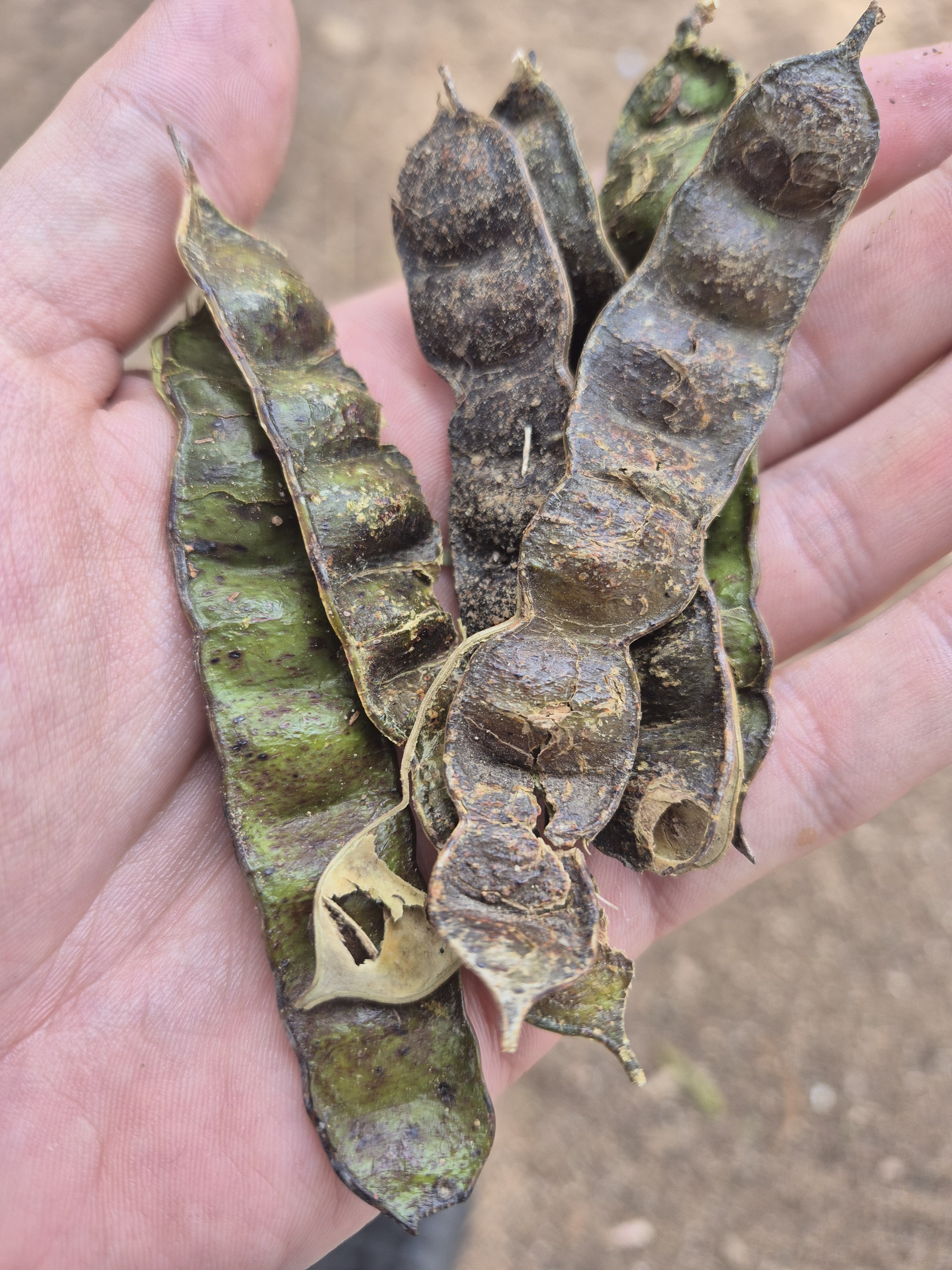
P. rigida fruits

Parapiptadenia rigida is a perennial shrub or tree. It is not a threatened species. It is native to Argentina, Brazil, Paraguay and Uruguay. Common names include angico, angico-cedro, angico-do-banhado, angico-dos-montes, angico-verdadeiro, angico-vermelho (in Spanish angico is changed for anchico), guarucaia and paric.

Parapiptadenia rigida grows from about 18 to 30 m (59 to 98 ft) in height and it has a straight trunk which has slightly furrowed bark. The foliage is dark green and the flowers are greenish-yellow 5 to 9 cm (2.0 to 3.5 in) long. It blooms in the spring. The seed pods grow 9 to 16 cm (3.5 to 6.3 in) in length. The seeds are flat, oval and brown. It is found along the lengths of rivers.

== Uses ==
=== Essential oils ===
Essential oils from the tree are becoming more widely recognized in industrial fragrance production.

=== Gum ===
Gum from the tree can be used in the same way as gum arabic.

=== Traditional uses ===
Extracts from the tree have astringent, expectorant, anti-diarrheal, and hemorrhage-arresting properties. It is used for its antiseptic properties in southern Brazil. The bark has a high tannin content of 15.0% and it is used in folk medicine as a bitter-tasting tonic and body cleanser. It is used to treat rickets, lack of appetite and muscle weakness. Parapiptadenia rigida is psychoactive.

=== Tannin ===
The tree's bark contains 15.0% tannin.

=== Wood ===
Its dense, wood is resistant to the elements and is used for construction, carpentry, beams for bridges, poles and firewood. The wood is said to be unaffected by insects including termites and it can last more than 20 years unpainted.

==== Mechanical properties ====
It has a "Janka Hardness" of 2300–3700 lb., a parallel "bending strength" of 16900 psi, a parallel "compression strength" of 8500 psi and a density of 720–1199 kg/m^{3} at a moisture content of 12–15%. Its modulus of elasticity is 157 801 kg/cm^{2}.

For hardwood flooring it is called "pepperwood".
