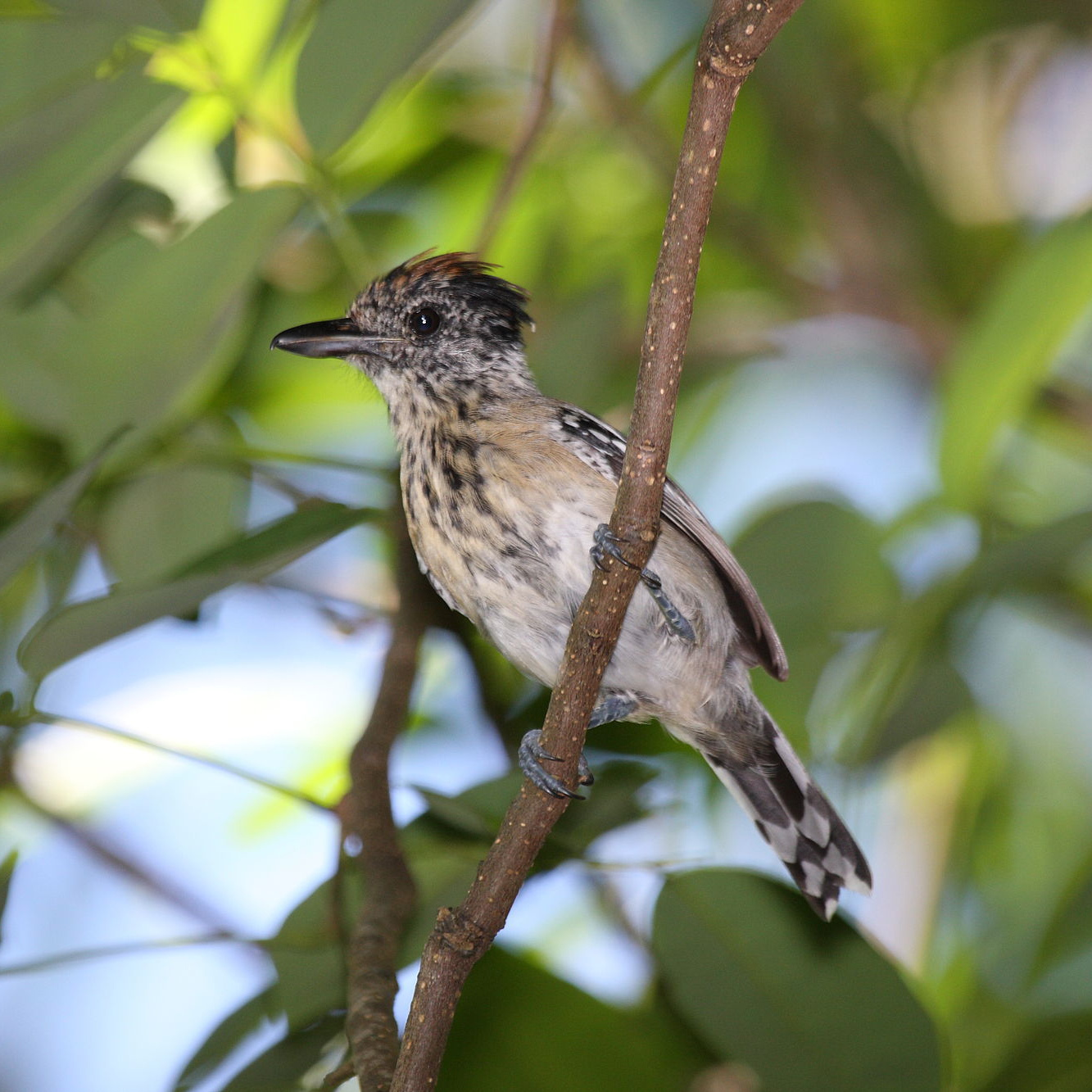
- Female black-crested antshrike
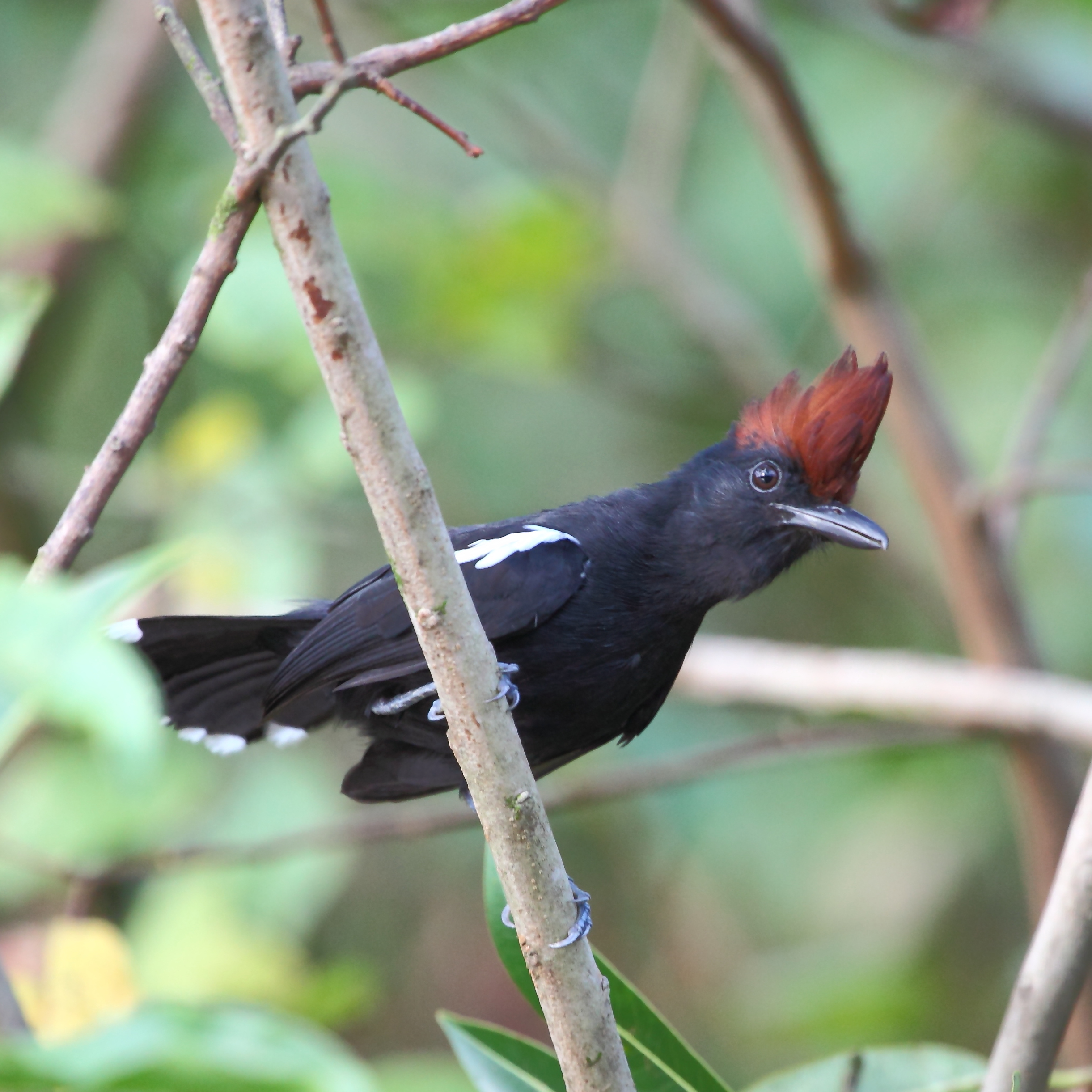
- Female glossy antshrike

Scientific classification
- Kingdom: Animalia
- Phylum: Chordata
- Class: Aves
- Order: Passeriformes
- Family: Thamnophilidae
- Genus: Sakesphorus; Chubb, 1918

Type species
- Lanius canadensis Linnaeus, 1766

Species
- 2, see text

= Sakesphorus =

Genus of birds

Sakesphorus is a genus of passerine birds in the antbird family, Thamnophilidae.

The genus Sakesphorus was erected by the British ornithologist Charles Chubb in 1918 with the black-crested antshrike as the type species. The name of genus is from the Ancient Greek sakesphoros "shield-bearing", from sakos "shield" and -phoros "-bearing".

The genus contains the following species:

- Black-crested antshrike (Sakesphorus canadensis)
- Glossy antshrike (Sakesphorus luctuosus)
