= ENGIE Brasil =

ENGIE Brasil Energia S.A.
- Company type: Sociedade Anônima
- Traded as: B3: EGIE3; Ibovespa Component
- Industry: Electricity
- Founded: 1998
- Headquarters: Florianópolis, Brazil
- Key people: Maurício Stolle Bähr, (Chairman); Eduardo Antonio Gori Sattamini, (CEO)
- Products: Electric power
- Revenue: ▲US$ 2.2 billion (2018)
- Net income: ▲US$ 592.3 million (2018)
- Number of employees: 1,100
- Parent: ENGIE
- Website: www.engieenergia.com.br

ENGIE Brasil formerly Tractebel Energia is a major Brazilian utility company, headquartered in Florianópolis, Santa Catarina. It is one of the largest private electricity producers in Brazil. Its 11 plants, six of them hydroelectric and the remainder thermal, have an installed capacity of 9,000 MW. ENGIE Brasil's major shareholder is ENGIE, the Paris-based utility company.

The company originated as Gerasul, short for Centrais Geradoras do Sul do Brasil SA ('Power plants of the South of Brazil' in English) which was sold to Tractebel by Brazil's Eletrosul in 1998. Gerasul held Eletrosul's power generation assets in the southern Brazilian states of Santa Catarina, Rio Grande do Sul, Paraná and Mato Grosso do Sul. Gerasul changed its name to Tractebel Energia in 2002.

ENGIE owns around 68% of ENGIE Brasil stocks, which is traded on B3, the Sao Paulo Stock Exchange.
