= Itá, Santa Catarina =

Coordinates: 27°16′S 52°19′W

- Municipality
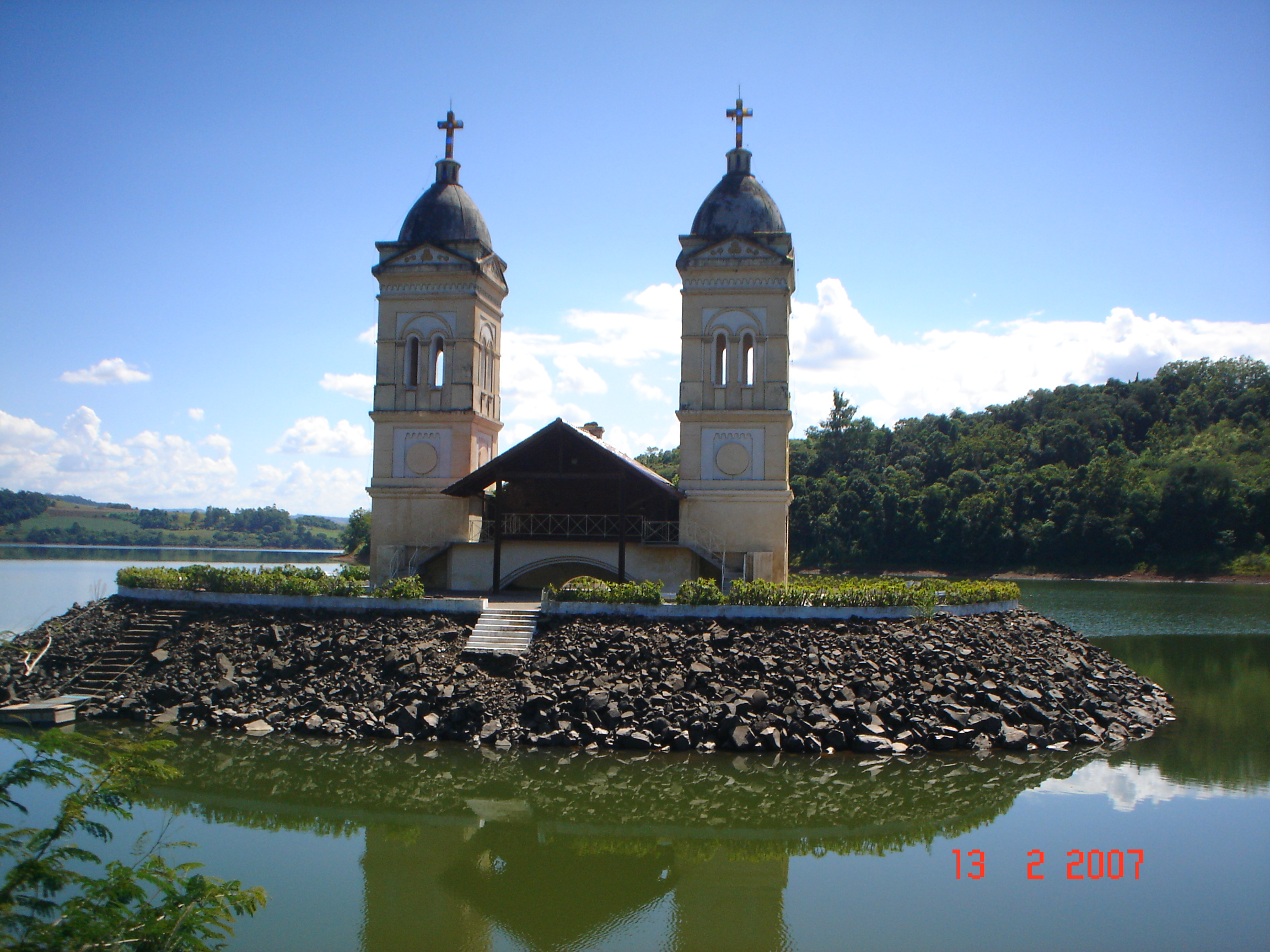

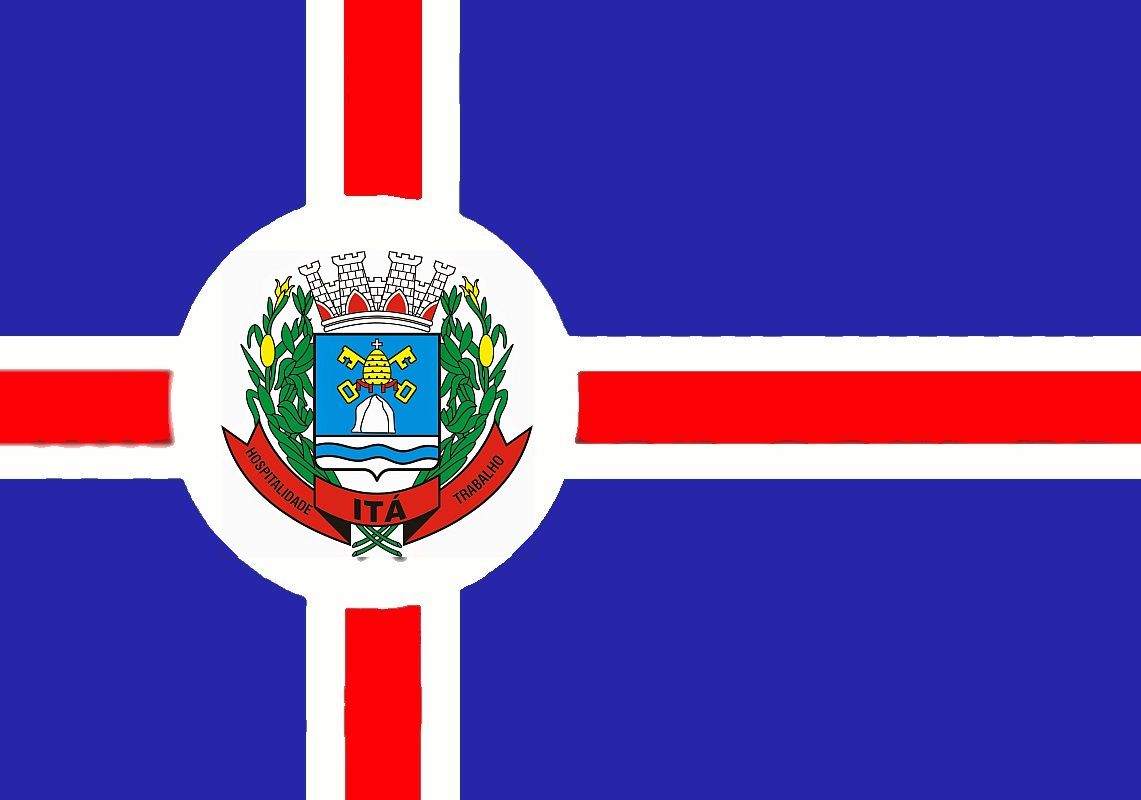
- Flag Coat of arms
- Interactive map of Itá, Santa Catarina
- Country: Brazil
- Region: South
- State: Santa Catarina
- Mesoregion: Oeste Catarinense

Population (2020)
  - Total: 6,129
- Time zone: UTC -3

Itá, Santa Catarina is a municipality in the state of Santa Catarina in the South region of Brazil.

== Climate ==
Climate data for Itá, Santa Catarina, elevation 387 m (1,270 ft), (1976–2005)
Month	Jan	Feb	Mar	Apr	May	Jun	Jul	Aug	Sep	Oct	Nov	Dec	Year
Record high °C (°F)	39.0 (102.2)	37.4 (99.3)	36.5 (97.7)	39.6 (103.3)	32.2 (90.0)	29.5 (85.1)	31.8 (89.2)	34.6 (94.3)	36.0 (96.8)	37.0 (98.6)	43.4 (110.1)	40.2 (104.4)	43.4 (110.1)
Mean daily maximum °C (°F)	31.8 (89.2)	30.0 (86.0)	29.9 (85.8)	26.6 (79.9)	22.7 (72.9)	20.3 (68.5)	20.7 (69.3)	23.1 (73.6)	24.4 (75.9)	27.0 (80.6)	29.4 (84.9)	31.3 (88.3)	26.4 (79.6)
Daily mean °C (°F)	24.4 (75.9)	23.4 (74.1)	22.5 (72.5)	19.8 (67.6)	16.1 (61.0)	14.2 (57.6)	13.9 (57.0)	16.0 (60.8)	17.5 (63.5)	20.1 (68.2)	22.1 (71.8)	24.0 (75.2)	19.5 (67.1)
Mean daily minimum °C (°F)	18.5 (65.3)	17.1 (62.8)	16.9 (62.4)	14.5 (58.1)	11.1 (52.0)	9.2 (48.6)	8.5 (47.3)	9.9 (49.8)	11.6 (52.9)	13.9 (57.0)	15.6 (60.1)	17.3 (63.1)	13.7 (56.6)
Record low °C (°F)	9.8 (49.6)	7.0 (44.6)	5.8 (42.4)	1.8 (35.2)	−4.0 (24.8)	−4.4 (24.1)	−6.0 (21.2)	−2.6 (27.3)	2.0 (35.6)	3.0 (37.4)	4.8 (40.6)	—	−6.0 (21.2)
Average precipitation mm (inches)	176.0 (6.93)	163.0 (6.42)	145.0 (5.71)	128.0 (5.04)	157.0 (6.18)	148.0 (5.83)	137.0 (5.39)	107.0 (4.21)	188.0 (7.40)	224.0 (8.82)	163.0 (6.42)	172.0 (6.77)	1,908 (75.12)
Average relative humidity (%)	78	82	80	83	85	86	83	81	78	77	76	75	80
Mean monthly sunshine hours	218	182	207	153	138	109	152	155	153	194	225	239	2,125
Source 1: Empresa Brasileira de Pesquisa Agropecuária (EMBRAPA)
Source 2: Climatempo (precipitation)

== See also ==
- List of municipalities in Santa Catarina
