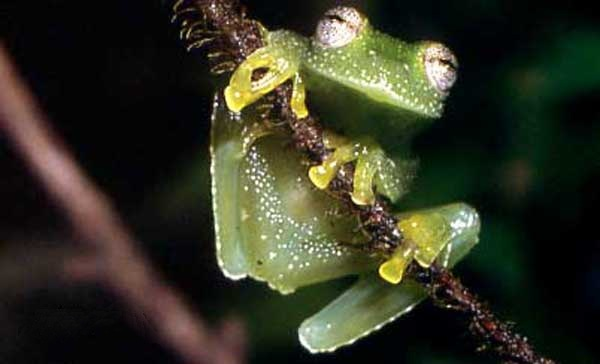

Conservation status
- Least Concern (IUCN 3.1)

Scientific classification
- Kingdom: Animalia
- Phylum: Chordata
- Class: Amphibia
- Order: Anura
- Family: Centrolenidae
- Genus: Vitreorana
- Species: V. uranoscopa

Binomial name
- Vitreorana uranoscopa (Müller, 1924)

Synonyms
- Hyla (Hylella) uranoscopa Müller, 1924; Centrolenella uranoscopa (Müller, 1924); Cochranella uranoscopa (Müller, 1924); Hyalinobatrachium uranoscopum (Müller, 1924); Cochranella albotunica Taylor and Cochran, 1953; Cochranella dubia Taylor and Cochran, 1953; Cochranella lutzorum Taylor and Cochran, 1953; Cochranella vanzolinii Taylor and Cochran, 1953; Centrolenella albotunica (Taylor and Cochran, 1953); Centrolenella dubia (Taylor and Cochran, 1953); Centrolenella lutzorum (Taylor and Cochran, 1953); Centrolenella vanzolinii (Taylor and Cochran, 1953)

= Vitreorana uranoscopa =

Species of frog

Vitreorana uranoscopa is a species of frog in the family Centrolenidae. It is found in southeastern and southern Brazil, from Minas Gerais and Espírito Santo southward to northern Rio Grande do Sul, and in northeastern Argentina; it is also likely to be found in adjacent Paraguay. Common name Humboldt's grass frog has been proposed for it.

It occurs in primary and secondary forest at elevations below 1,200 m (3,900 ft) above sea level. It is typically found in the immediate vicinity of running water, usually clinging close to leaves of herbaceous vegetation and trees. The eggs are deposited on leaves above water, to which the tadpoles drop upon hatching. It can be a locally common species. It is not threatened as a species, but probable threats to it relate to habitat loss caused by clear-cutting, dams, tourism, and human settlement. It is present in several protected areas.
