= Rio Madeira HVDC system =

HVDC transmission line in Brazil

- Location of Rio Madeira HVDC system

Location
- Country: Brazil
- State: Rondônia, São Paulo
- Coordinates: 08°54′53″S 63°57′27″W ( Porto Velho); 21°49′59″S 48°20′52″W ( Araraquara); 21°37′10″S 48°35′24″W ( Araraquara)
- From: Porto Velho, Rondônia
- To: Araraquara, São Paulo

Construction information
- Substation manufacturer: ABB, Alstom Grid
- Commissioned: 2013-2014

Technical information
- Type: Transmission
- Current type: HVDC
- Total length: 2,375 km (1,476 mi)
- Capacity: 2 x 3150 MW
- DC voltage: ±600 kV
- No. of poles: 4

The Rio Madeira HVDC system is a high-voltage direct current transmission system in Brazil, built to export power from new hydro power plants on the Madeira River in the Amazon Basin to the major load centres of southeastern Brazil. The system consists of two converter stations at Porto Velho in the state of Rondônia and Araraquara in São Paulo state, interconnected by two bipolar ±600 kV DC transmission lines with a capacity of 3,150 megawatts (4,220,000 hp) each. In addition to the converters for the two bipoles, the Porto Velho converter station also includes two 400 MW back-to-back converters to supply power to the local 230 kV AC system. Hence the total export capacity of the Porto Velho station is 7100 MW: 6300 MW from the two bipoles and 800 MW from the two back-to-back converters. When Bipole 1 commenced commercial operation in 2014, Rio Madeira became the world’s longest HVDC line, surpassing the Xiangjiaba–Shanghai system in China. According to the energy research organisation Empresa de Pesquisa Energética (EPE), the length of the line is 2,375 kilometres (1,476 mi).

== Generating plant ==
The northern (Porto Velho) converter station is connected, via a 500 kV AC collector grid (Coletora Porto Velho), to the new Rio Madeira hydro plant complex. As of January 2013 this consisted of two generating stations: Santo Antônio, close to Porto Velho, with a capacity of 3150 MW, and Jirau, with a capacity of 3750 MW, approximately 100 kilometres (62 mi) away. Both generating plants are of the low-head, so-called run of river type in order to minimise the environmental impact of the project. They use bulb turbines, which are a type of horizontal-axis Kaplan turbine. These have very low inertia compared to other types of hydro-electric generator, and this led to concerns that the turbines could be damaged by over-speed in the event of a sudden interruption to power transmission on the HVDC lines.

== Planning of the transmission system ==
With such a long transmission distance (2375 km), HVDC would seem to be the natural solution for transporting the generated power to the load centres of south-east Brazil, but a very comprehensive techno-economic analysis was nevertheless performed to evaluate the relative benefits of various different solutions. A total of 16 options were initially examined, including three all-DC options at 500 kV, 600 kV and 800 kV, as well as several all-AC options and hybrid DC+AC options. In the end it was concluded that DC, at a transmission voltage of 600 kV (the same as for the Itaipu scheme in southern Brazil) was the preferred option.

Nevertheless, two of the other options (an all-AC option and a hybrid AC+DC option) were also taken forward to the second stage of project planning. Thus there were three options put forward for the final selection:

- All-DC option: Two ±600 kV, 3150 MW transmission bipoles, plus two 400 MW back to back converters
- Hybrid AC+DC option: One ±600 kV, 3150 MW transmission bipole plus two 500 kV AC lines
- All-AC option: Three 765 kV AC lines

The winner from the three short-listed options was decided by an auction in November 2008 and proved to be the ±600 kV all-DC option. This option was divided into seven separate packages, referred to as Lots 1–7:

- Lot 1: Porto Velho 500 kV AC substation plus two 400 MW back-to-back converters
- Lot 2: Two ±600 kV, 3150 MW converter stations for Bipole 1
- Lot 3: Two ±600 kV, 3150 MW converter stations for Bipole 2
- Lot 4: Two ±600 kV, 3150 MW transmission lines for Bipole 1
- Lot 5: Two ±600 kV, 3150 MW transmission lines for Bipole 2
- Lot 6: Receiving end AC substation
- Lot 7: Grid reinforcement on 230 kV northern system

== Converter stations ==
Block diagram of a bipolar system with ground return as used on the two bipoles of the Rio Madeira project.

The transmission voltage of ±600 kV is the same as was used on the Itaipu project, but for Rio Madeira the converters are designed with only a single twelve-pulse bridge per pole.

The Porto Velho converter station contains the rectifier terminals of the two ±600 kV bipoles, as well as the two 400 MW back-to-back converters. The Bipole 1 converter stations and the two back-to-back converters have been built by ABB and were commissioned in August 2014. The Bipole 2 converter stations been built by Alstom Grid and as at February 2015 are still undergoing commissioning.

All the HVDC converters use air-insulated, water-cooled thyristor valves, suspended from the ceiling of the valve hall and using 125mm diameter thyristors. Both converter stations of Bipole 2 and the Araraquara converter station of Bipole 1 use single-phase, two-winding converter transformers with the thyristor valves arranged in double-valves, but the Porto Velho Bipole 1 converter station used single-phase three-winding converter transformers (because the river made the transport of larger transformers feasible than was the case at Araraquara) and valves arranged in quadrivalves.

Because the 230 kV network in Rondônia and Acre is very weak, the back-to-back converters are implemented as Capacitor Commutated Converters (CCC). The thyristor valves being much smaller than those of the transmission bipoles, it was possible to arrange each back-to-back converter as just three valve stacks of eight valves each (octovalves).

The design of certain aspects of the two bipoles (which were supplied by different manufacturers) needed to be coordinated in order to avoid adverse control interactions or harmonic filtering problems. In addition, a considerable number of different operating modes needed to be taken into account, such as paralleling the converters of both bipoles onto a single transmission line. There is also a requirement for power flow in the south–north direction, although only at a reduced level. These aspects, along with the complex structure of the project with multiple engineering companies involved at the same time, led to some delays in the project.
