= Malt Kiln Farmhouse =

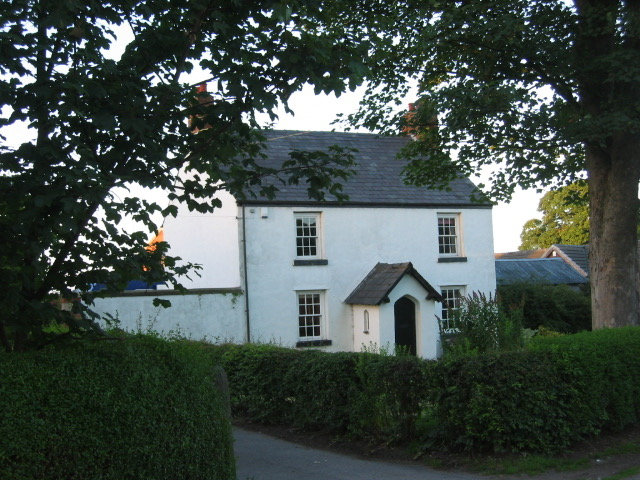
- The property in 2003

- Location within Lancashire
- 53.83364°N 2.90195°W
- Location: Greenhalgh-with-Thistleton, Lancashire, England

History
- Built: mid-18th century

Site notes
- Area: Borough of Fylde

Listed Building – Grade II
- Designated: 11 June 1986
- Reference no.: 1072019

Malt Kiln Farmhouse is an historic building in Greenhalgh-with-Thistleton, Lancashire, England. It is believed to date to the mid-18th century, and has been designated a Grade II listed building by Historic England. The property is located on a short lane just off the northern side of Thistleton Road.

The building is constructed of rendered brick with a slate roof in two storeys and with a symmetrical two-bay front. In the centre is an open gabled porch. The windows are 12-pane sashes. At the rear is a large stairlight.

John Cumsty was the farm's proprietor in the early 20th century.

== See also ==
- Listed buildings in Greenhalgh-with-Thistleton
