= TBEA =

Chinese electrical equipment manufacturer

TBEA Co., Ltd.
- Type: Public
- Traded as: SSE: 600089; CSI A100
- Industry: Power engineering, electrical equipment manufacturing
- Headquarters: Changji, Xinjiang, China
- Products: Transformers; Cables and wires; Solar power stations; Aluminum ingots

Chinese name
- Simplified Chinese: 特变电工股份有限公司
Transcriptions

Chinese short name
- Simplified Chinese: 特变电工
Transcriptions
- Website: www.tbea.com.cn

TBEA Co., Ltd. (formerly Tebian Electric Apparatus) is a Chinese manufacturer of power transformers and other electrical equipment, as well as a developer of transmission and renewable energy projects. Alongside competitors such as Tianwei Baobian Electric and the XD Group, TBEA is one of the major Chinese producers of transformers.

== Power construction and manufacturing ==
=== Equipment manufacturing ===
TBEA operates a manufacturing base in Karjan, Gujarat, India, under the name TBEA Energy (India) Pvt Ltd., where it produces transformers, solar equipment, and cables for markets across India, Africa, and the Middle East.

=== Construction engineering ===
TBEA has undertaken transmission and power infrastructure projects globally.

- In Ethiopia, the company was contracted to develop the transmission line from the Gilgel Gibe III Dam to Addis Ababa in 2009.
- In Zambia, TBEA signed a US$334 million EPC contract in 2010 with ZESCO to build 330 kV high-voltage transmission lines, supplying Eastern, Luapula, Northern, and Muchinga Provinces. The project broke ground in 2012.
- In The Gambia, TBEA constructed the 23 MW Jambur Solar Power Station, commissioned in March 2024. It was part of the Gambia Electricity Restoration and Modernization Project (GERMP) with funding from the World Bank, European Investment Bank, and EU.

=== Power stations ===
In Kyrgyzstan, TBEA was selected to reconstruct a power plant in Bishkek. The decision, reportedly influenced by political pressure, led to controversy over inflated costs and corruption allegations against local officials. The plant suffered a breakdown in 2018 shortly after reopening, but preliminary investigations indicated the failure occurred in a section not rebuilt by TBEA.

== Renewable energy ==
TBEA has expanded significantly in renewable energy development:

- In August 2024, it announced a ¥3.5 billion investment for a 1 GW solar + storage project and a ¥6.6 billion investment for a 2 GW wind + storage project in Zhundong, Xinjiang.
- In Turkey, TBEA partnered with C&D Clean Energy to deliver 6.3 MW of central inverters for a solar project in Adana commissioned in July 2024.
- In Shandong, China, it developed a 50 MW solar farm on a former coal mining subsidence area in Xintai, showcasing its brownfield-to-greenfield transition efforts.

== Mining ==
TBEA has expanded into the mining sector as part of its overseas investment strategy. In 2015, the company was granted a mining license by the government of Tajikistan to develop the Upper Kumarg and Eastern Duoba gold deposits in the Sughd Region. This arrangement was made in exchange for TBEA's construction of the Dushanbe-2 combined heat and power (CHP) plant, a major energy infrastructure project in the capital city. TBEA had previously been awarded exploration rights to the deposits in 2013. By 2019, gold extraction had begun at the sites, and as of late 2021, TBEA had completed about half of the construction of a new gold processing facility in Ayni district. The total cost of the project was estimated at 272 million somonis (approximately US$24 million).

In 2023, TBEA expressed interest in investing in Ethiopia’s new energy and mining sectors, in discussions with the Ethiopian ambassador to China.

== See also ==
- Quaid-e-Azam Solar Park
