= Xiangjiaba–Shanghai HVDC system =

High-voltage direct current transmission system in China

Location
- Country: China
- Coordinates: 28°32′47″N 104°25′04″E; 30°55′32″N 121°46′16″E
- From: Xiangjiaba Dam
- To: Shanghai

Ownership information
- Owner: State Grid Corporation of China

Construction information
- Substation manufacturer: State Grid Corporation of China, ABB, Siemens
- Substation installer: State Grid Corporation of China
- Commissioned: 2010

Technical information
- Type: Transmission
- Current type: HVDC
- Total length: 2,000 km (1,200 mi)
- Capacity: 6400 MW
- DC voltage: ±800 kV
- No. of poles: 2

The Xiangjiaba–Shanghai HVDC system is a ±800 kV, 6400 MW high-voltage direct current transmission system in China. The system was built to export hydro power from Xiangjiaba Dam in Sichuan province, to the major city of Shanghai. Built and owned by State Grid Corporation of China (SGCC), the system became the world's largest-capacity HVDC system when it was completed in July 2010, although it has already been overtaken by the 7200 MW Jinping–Sunan HVDC scheme which was put into operation in December 2012. It also narrowly missed becoming the world's first 800 kV HVDC line, with the first pole of the Yunnan–Guangdong project having been put into service 6 months earlier. It was also the world's longest HVDC line when completed, this record having been taken in 2014 by the Rio Madeira project in Brazil.

Various values are quoted for the length of the Xiangjiaba–Shanghai DC line, ranging from 1,907 kilometres (1,185 mi) to 2,070 kilometres (1,290 mi), but in any event the line is significantly longer than that of the 1,700 kilometres (1,100 mi) Inga–Shaba project in Democratic Republic of Congo which had held the record since 1982. Significant design and development work had to be performed to qualify the specialised equipment for operation at 800 kV. The design is a bipolar system with overhead lines for the high-voltage conductors and ground return for the neutral current. However, because of the very high operating voltage and power, each pole contains two twelve pulse bridges in series at each end.

== Converter stations ==
The Fulong (rectifier) converter station is located approximately 10 km south of Xiangjiaba Dam and is connected to the power plant by four 500 kV AC lines. The thyristor valves were supplied by Siemens together with its partner XD Xi’an Power Rectifier Works. The valves use state of the art 8.5 kV rated, 150 mm diameter electrically triggered thyristors. Ten of the converter transformers were also supplied by Siemens.

The Fengxia (inverter) converter station is located some 45 km south-east from the centre of Shanghai and feeds power to the Nanhui AC substation via three 500 kV AC lines. Much of the DC equipment at the Fengxia station was provided by ABB, including the thyristor valves and converter transformers. In common with the valves at the Fulong station, the valves use 8.5 kV rated, 150 mm diameter electrically triggered thyristors. At Fengxia, each valve consists of 56 series connected thyristor levels (of which two are redundant), arranged in 8 thyristor modules of 7 thyristor levels each.

== Waypoints ==
Block diagram of a bipolar system with ground return as used on the Xiangjiaba–Shanghai project.

Site	Coordinates
Fulong HVDC Static Inverter	28°32′47″N 104°25′04″E
Fengxia Electrode Line Branch	30°54′39″N 121°08′00″E
Fengxia Electrode	30°47′4″N 121°08′09″E
Fengxia HVDC Static Inverter	30°55′32″N 121°46′16″E

== See also ==
- High-voltage direct current
- HVDC converter station
- HVDC converter
- Ultra-high-voltage electricity transmission in China
- Xiangjiaba Dam
- Yunnan–Guangdong HVDC
