= Ivy House, Greenhalgh-with-Thistleton =

Ivy House
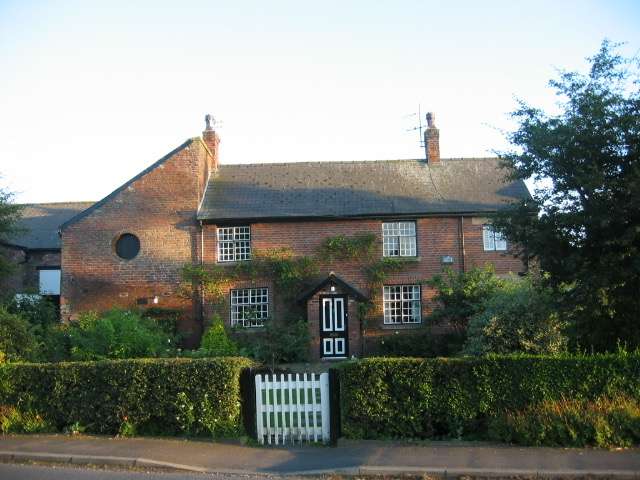
- The property in 2003

- Location within Lancashire
- 53.83413°N 2.90435°W
- Location: Greenhalgh-with-Thistleton, Lancashire, England

History
- Built: early 18th century

Site notes
- Area: Borough of Fylde

Listed Building – Grade II
- Designated: 11 June 1986
- Reference no.: 1362356

Ivy House is an historic building in Greenhalgh-with-Thistleton, Lancashire, England. It is believed to date to the early 18th century, and has been designated a Grade II listed building by Historic England. The property is located on Thistleton Road.

The building is a brick farmhouse with a slate roof in two storeys. It originally was in two bays, with an additions bay added to the right, and an outshut and an extension at the rear. In the original part is a central doorway and two windows in each floor divided by mullions and transoms into 30 panes.

== See also ==
- Listed buildings in Greenhalgh-with-Thistleton
