= By the Way (disambiguation) =

By the Way is a 2002 album by the Red Hot Chili Peppers.

By the Way may also refer to:

== Music ==
- "By the Way" (Red Hot Chili Peppers song) (2002)
- "By the Way" (Theory of a Deadman song) (2009)
- "By the Way" (Lindsay Ell song) (2015)
- "By the Way", a 1969 song by The Tremeloes A. Blakley, L. Hawkes
- "By the Way", a song by Barbra Streisand from Lazy Afternoon (1975), B-side to "My Father's Song"
- "By the Way", a song by No Doubt from The Beacon Street Collection (1995)
- "By the Way", a song by Hinder from Extreme Behavior (2005)
- "By the Way", a 1982 song by Modern Romance
- "By the Way", a 2019 song by Teenage Joans
- "By the Way", a 2023 song by Griffen Palmer from Unlearn

== Other uses ==
- By the Way, Greenhalgh-with-Thistleton, a 17th-century cottage in Lancashire, England
- By the Way (TV series) (1979), children's show that aired on the Nickelodeon channel in 1979 as one of the network's inaugural programs.

== See also ==
- BTW (disambiguation)
