= BTW =

BTW or btw may refer to:

- Booker T. Washington (1856–1915), an American educator, author, and orator
- BTW (company), a Chinese manufacturer
- BTW (conference), a conference series about information technology
- Bak–Tang–Wiesenfeld sandpile, a cellular automaton model
- British Traditional Wicca, a set of Wiccan traditions originating in the New Forest region
- Buckfast Tonic Wine, a fortified wine licensed from Buckfast Abbey in Devon
- The Brotherhood of Timber Workers, 1910s labor union
- Burlington Trailways, an Inter-city bus company
- BTW (TV station), in Bunbury, Western Australia
- "B.T.W", a 2021 song by Jay B and Jay Park

== Codes ==
- btw - ISO 639-3 code for Butuanon language
- BTW - IATA airport code for Batu Licin Airport, Indonesia
- BTW - Station code for Beauty World MRT station, Singapore

== See also ==
- By the Way (disambiguation)
