= Yunnan–Guangdong HVDC =

HVDC overhead power line in China

Location
- Country: China
- Province: Yunnan, Guangdong
- General direction: west-east
- From: Chuxiong
- To: Suidong, Zengcheng

Ownership information
- Owner: China Southern Power Grid

Construction information
- Substation manufacturer: Siemens
- Construction started: 2007
- Commissioned: 2010

Technical information
- Type: overhead transmission line
- Current type: Ultra HVDC
- Total length: 1,418 km (881 mi)
- Capacity: 5,000
- AC voltage: 500 kV
- DC voltage: 800 kV
- No. of poles: 2

The Yunnan–Guangdong HVDC is a high-voltage direct current transmission system connecting Chuxiong in the Yunnan to Suidong, Zengcheng in Guangdong, China. It is the first HVDC link in the world operating at a transmission voltage of 800 kV. The transmission line is operated by China Southern Power Grid. In 2007, the order to supply the system was awarded to Siemens Energy. The first pole was put into operation in December 2009 with the second pole to follow in June 2010.

The transmission system has a transmission capacity of 5,000 MW and a rated DC current of 3,125 A. It has a total length of 1,418 kilometres (881 mi). It transmits electricity from the hydropower plants in the Yunnan to the Guangdong, including cities of Guangzhou and Shenzhen.

Yunnan–Guangdong HVDC shares the grounding electrode together with HVDC Guizhou-Guangdong II at Linwu (coordinates: 23°44′48″ N 113°17′09″E).

== See also ==
- Southern Hami–Zhengzhou UHVDC
