= Energy rationing =

Energy conservation practice

Energy rationing primarily involves measures that are designed to force energy conservation as an alternative to price mechanisms in energy markets. Because of its economic consequences, energy rationing is used as method of last resort, often at times of emergency such as during an energy crisis.

== Forms ==
Examples of energy rationing include fuel rationing and the use of ration books or ration stamps to restrict personal consumption. Energy rationing may include penalties such as surcharges and disconnection from electrical supply for those who choose not to reduce their demand voluntarily.

Load shedding is a common form of energy rationing used when electricity markets cannot keep up to demand, particularly peak demand. Limited electrical supply from power stations at times of drought or after infrastructure is damaged, can lead authorities to implement rationing. Brazil was forced to implement energy rationing due to drought in 2001. Reducing demand in this way aims to avoid forced power outages which are more disruptive than rationing.

Tradable Energy Quotas is an energy rationing system designed to enable nations to reduce their emissions of greenhouse gases along with their use of oil, gas and coal, and to ensure fair access to energy for all.

== Issues ==
One issue with energy rationing is the cost of setting up rationing schemes. Another criticism is that energy rationing schemes are unworkable and face many practical problems including consumer lawsuits. Due to the general disdain for restrictions that interfere with existing personal freedoms, such as ecotaxes and carbon rationing, energy rationing is not favoured by policy makers to mitigate global warming.

=== Peak oil ===
As oil becomes more scarce due to oil depletion, countries that have reserve currencies will prefer to buy oil rather than ration it. The Oil Depletion Protocol is form of energy rationing that was developed by Richard Heinberg to ensure that price rationing does not price out poorer countries.

== See also ==
- Energy descent
- Food rationing
- Rolling blackout
