= Santo Antônio Dam =

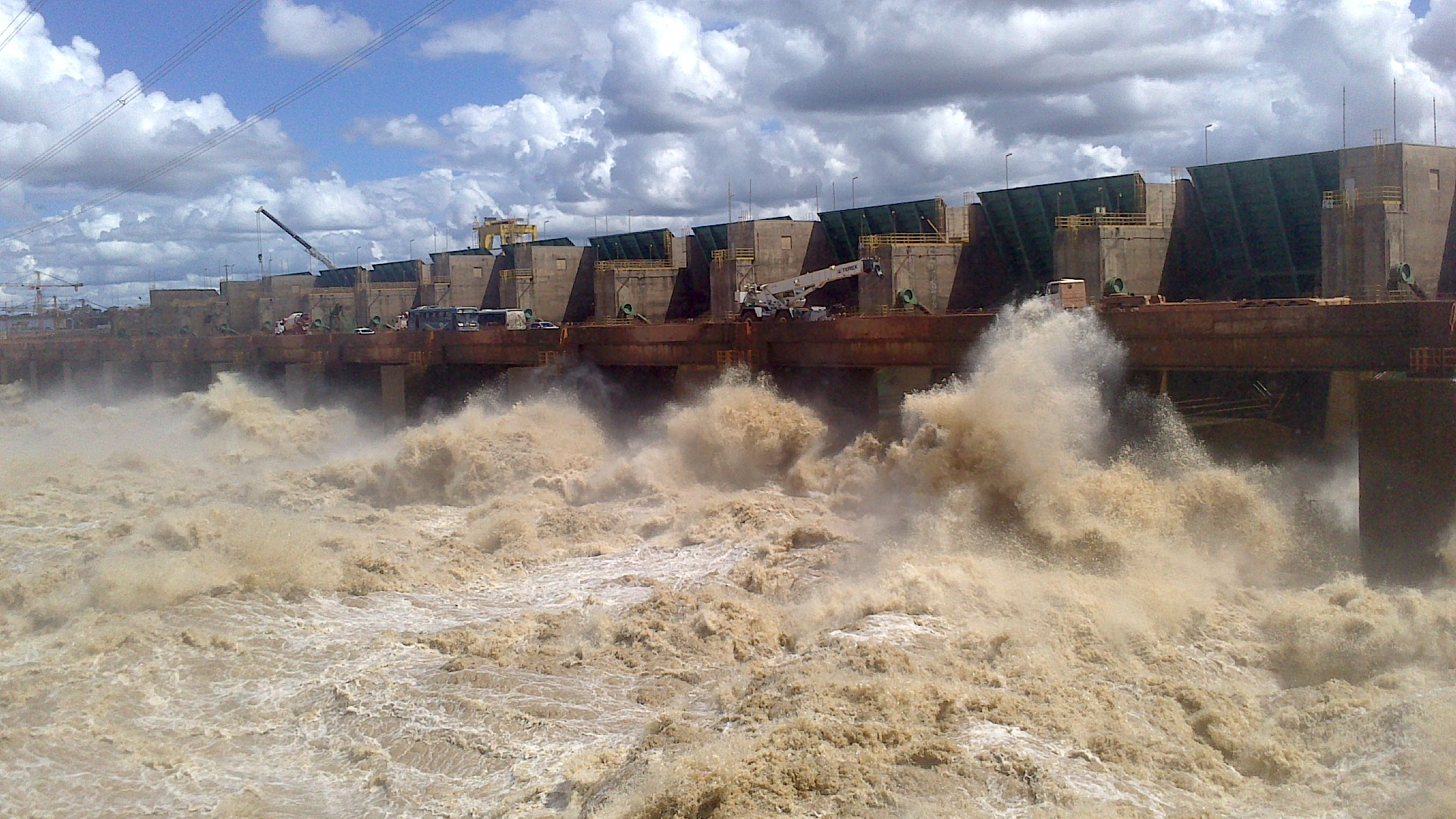
- Santo Antônio Dam

- Location of the Santo Antônio Dam in Brazil
- Official name: Usina Hidrelétrica Santo Antônio
- Location: Porto Velho, Rondônia, Brazil
- Coordinates: 8°48′06″S 63°57′03″W
- Status: Operational
- Construction began: 2008
- Opening date: 2012
- Construction cost: US$7 billion
- Owner: Santo Antônio Energia
- Operator: Eletronorte

Dam and spillways
- Type of dam: Gravity, composite
- Impounds: Madeira River
- Height: 13.9 m (46 ft)
- Length: 3,100 m (10,171 ft)
- Spillways: 2
- Spillway type: Service and auxiliary, gate-controlled
- Spillway capacity: 84,000 m^{3}/s (2,966,432 cu ft/s)

Reservoir
- Surface area: 271 km^{2} (105 mi^{2})
- Maximum water depth: 11 m (36 ft) (average)
- Normal elevation: 70 m (230 ft)

Power Station
- Operator: Eletronorte
- Type: Run-of-the-river
- Hydraulic head: 13.5 m (44 ft)
- Turbines: 50 x 71.6 MW Kaplan bulb turbines
- Installed capacity: 3,568.3 MW; 3,580 MW (max)
- Website www.santoantonioenergia.com.br/en/home/

The Santo Antônio Dam is a hydroelectric dam on the Madeira River 6 km (4 mi) southwest of Porto Velho in the state of Rondônia, Brazil. The dam's run-of-the-river hydroelectric power station has 50 turbines, each rated at 71.6 MW resulting in a total installed capacity of 3,580 MW. The first unit began commercial production in March 2012, and as of June 2015 a total of 32 units were operational. The last 6 units went online in December 2016. Most of the power will be exported to south-eastern Brazil via the Rio Madeira HVDC system.

The dam is part of a planned four power plant Madeira river hydroelectric complex, which will consist of two dams in Brazil (Santo Antônio and 3,750 MW Jirau Dam about 100 km upstream), a third on the border of Brazil and Bolivia (Guayaramerin), and a fourth station inside Bolivia (Cachuela Esperanza). Santo Antonio and Jirau Dam are operating, while the smaller upstream dams are still in the planning stages. In part due to the 2001-2002 power shortage in Brazil, construction of both dams was accelerated in 2009. The total estimated cost of the two facilities currently under construction is $15.6 billion ($7 billion for Santo Antônio), including about $10 billion for the civil engineering and power plants, and $5 billion for ship locks, transmission lines, and environmental re-mediation. The Madeira river hydroelectric complex is part of the Initiative for the Integration of the Regional Infrastructure of South America, an effort by South American governments to integrate the continent's infrastructure with new investments in transportation, energy, and communication.

== Design ==
The Santo Antônio Dam is designed as a run-of-the-river hydroelectric dam, power plant, and factory. The dam itself is 13.9 m (46 ft) tall and 3,100 m (10,171 ft) long, creating a reservoir with a surface area of 271 km^{2} (105 mi^{2}), of which 164 km^{2} (63 mi^{2}) is the previously existing river channel. The dam's power plant consists of 50 Kaplan-bulb turbines, each capable of 71.6MW (total installed capacity of 3,580 MW) divided into four sets. The original project called for 44 turbines, but this was expanded in 2013. The power plant have a maximum discharge of 24,684 m^{3}/s (871,707 cu ft/s). The dam have two spillways; one on the main section and an auxiliary on the southern abutment. Both spillways have a combined maximum discharge of 84,000 m^{3}/s (2,966,432 cu ft/s) to control reservoir levels. The dam also supports two fish ladders and a shipping lock.

== Impacts ==
Brazilian law requires water impoundments to undergo a very thorough approval process to ensure that each project meets environmental, social, political safety criteria. However, critics of the Jirau and Santo Antonio dam claim that many legal criteria were rubber-stamped before all questions from impacted groups had been addressed. The dam's social impacts received the majority of substantive criticism (see below). However, environmental groups noted that the fast track approval for the Madeira dams sets a dangerous precedent. Brazilian law allows for expedited licensing for eco-friendly projects described by the Worldwatch institute as "kindler, gentler dams with smaller reservoirs, designed to lessen social and environmental impacts." The Worldwatch institute insists that no project should "fast-track the licensing of new dams in Amazonia and allow projects to circumvent Brazil's tough environmental laws".

=== Social ===
The most frequent objection is that the dam builders failed to adequately consult with indigenous peoples, as required by law. The Brazilian government indigenous protection foundation FUNAI predicts that there may be un-contacted indigenous populations in the region that will be affected by the Madeira complex. Most of the affected populations are nearest to the Jirau dam.

Other issues related with traditional Amazonian fishermen and little peasants, who are suffering with constant floodings, which, according to them, is caused by the dam.

=== Environmental ===
Because both the Jirau and Santo Antonio dams are run-of-the-river projects, neither dam impounds a large reservoir. Both dams also feature significant environmental re-mediation efforts. As a consequence, there has not been strong environmental opposition to the implementation of the Madeira river complex. However, critics point out that if the fish ladders fail, "several valuable migratory fish species could suffer near-extinction as a result of the Madeira dams." The strictly protected Serra dos Três Irmãos Ecological Station was reduced in size from 89,847 hectares (222,020 acres) to 87,412 hectares (216,000 acres) in September 2011 to allow for the dam's reservoir.

=== Opportunities for Bolivia ===
Bolivia has been a landlocked country since it lost its coastline to Chile in the War of the Pacific in 1884. Many Bolivians feel a deep and lasting bitterness due to this loss, and the Bolivian military continues to build and maintain an open ocean navy in Lake Titicaca, awaiting an eventual recovery of access to the sea. The Madeira river complex presents an opportunity for Bolivia because all of the hydroelectric dams would feature ship locks capable of raising and lowering oceangoing vessels. If the project is completed, "more than 4,000 km of waterways upstream from the dams in Brazil, Bolivia, and Peru would become navigable." Hence, if the project is completed, both Bolivian commercial vessels and the Bolivian navy would have access to the open ocean, and lucrative sea lanes, for the first time in 120 years.

== See also ==
- List of power stations in Brazil
- Jirau and Santo Antônio: tales of an Amazonian war (video documentary)
