= Jirau Dam =

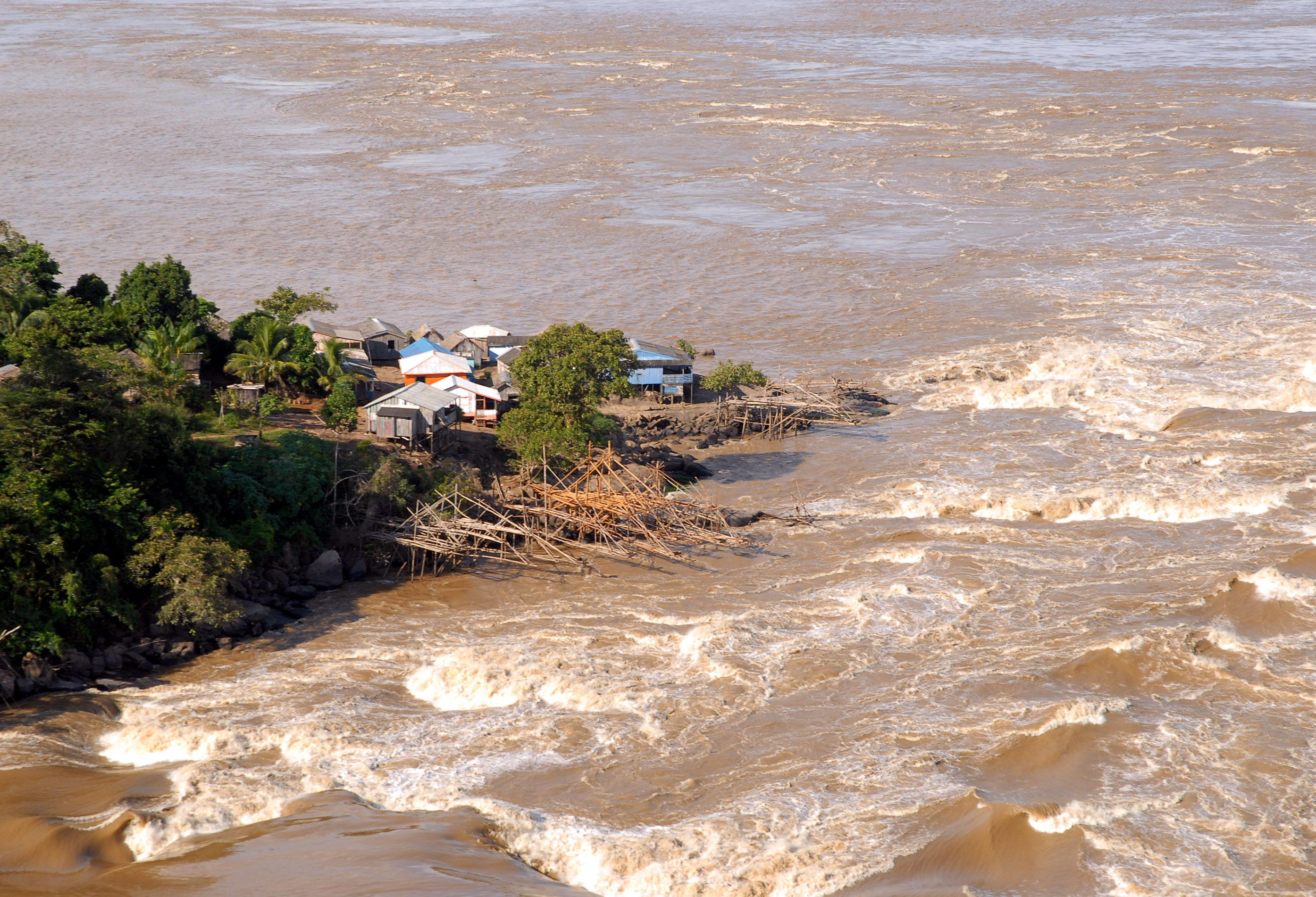
- Site of the Jirau Dam

- Location of the Jirau Dam in Brazil
- Interactive map of Jirau Dam
- Official name: Usina Hidrelétrica Jirau
- Location: Rondônia, Brazil
- Coordinates: 9°16′00″S 64°38′57″W
- Status: Operational
- Construction began: December 2008
- Opening date: December 2016
- Construction cost: US$8 billion
- Owner: ESBR
- Operator: Jirau Energia

Dam and spillways
- Type of dam: Embankment, concrete gravity composite
- Impounds: Madeira River
- Height: 63 m (207 ft)
- Length: 1,500 m (4,921 ft)
- Dam volume: 2,000,000 m^{3} (70,629,333 ft^{3}) (embankment)
- Spillway type: Overflow, 21 controlled gates
- Spillway capacity: 82,000 m^{3}/s (2,895,803 cu ft/s)

Reservoir
- Surface area: 258 km^{2} (100 mi^{2})

Power Station
- Operator: Jirau Energia
- Commission date: 2013–2016
- Hydraulic head: 15.10 m (50 ft)
- Turbines: 50 x 75 MW bulb turbines
- Installed capacity: 3,750 MW
- Annual generation: 19 100 GWh
- Website www.energiasustentaveldobrasil.com.br

The Jirau Dam is a rock-fill dam with an asphalt-concrete core, in the Madeira River in the state of Rondônia, Brazil. The dam's hydroelectric power stations have 50 turbines each 75 MW resulting total installed capacity of 3,750 MW. The power plant's first unit was commissioned in September 2013, the 16th in November 2014, 24th in February 2015, the 41st in December 2015, and the last in December 2016. Most of the power is designed to be exported to south-eastern Brazil via the Rio Madeira HVDC system.

The dam is part of a planned four power plant Madeira river hydroelectric complex, which will consist of two dams in Brazil (3,580 MW Santo Antônio Dam at the city of Porto Velho and Jirau), a third on the border of Brazil and Bolivia, and a fourth station inside Bolivia. Two of these, Santo Antonio and Jirau, are already operating, while the smaller upstream dams are still in the planning stages. In part due to the 2001–2002 power shortage in Brazil, construction of both dams was accelerated in 2009. The total estimated cost of the two facilities currently under construction is $15.6 billion ($8 billion for Jirau), including about $10 billion for the civil engineering and power plants, and $5 billion for ship locks, transmission lines, and environmental re-mediation. The Madeira river hydroelectric complex is part of the Initiative for the Integration of the Regional Infrastructure of South America, an effort by South American governments to integrate the continent's infrastructure with new investments in transportation, energy, and communication. Construction on the project was temporary halted in March 2011, February 2012 and April 2013 due to worker riots or strikes.

The Brazilian Development Bank approved an additional US$1.6 billion for the project in September 2012. The extra funding will add six more 75 MW bulb turbine-generators to the power station (a total of 50) and pay for transmission lines.

== Design ==
The Jirau Dam is a combination embankment dam with concrete sections for the power stations and spillway. The length of the entire dam is 1,100 m (3,609 ft) while the embankment section is 800 m (2,625 ft). The embankment dam is arched, 63 m (207 ft) tall and has an asphalt-core. Its structural volume is 2,000,000 m^{3} (70,629,333 ft^{3}) of which 17,000 m^{3} (600,349 ft^{3}) is asphalt. The dam's spillway consists of 21 gates and has a maximum discharge of 82,000 m^{3}/s (2,895,803 cu ft/s). The run-of-the-river dam's power station contain 50 x 75 MW bulb turbines for a total installed capacity of 3,750 MW. The reservoir created by the dam has a surface area of 258 km^{2} (100 mi^{2}) of which 135 km^{2} (52 mi^{2}) is the original riverbed. Bulb turbines are a variation of the Kaplan turbine, with the main differences being that bulb turbines are installed horizontally and are generally considered to be slightly more efficient. The power plant is constructed by Energias Sustentáveis do Brasil and Brazilian company Camargo Correa SA.

== Impacts ==
Brazilian law requires water impoundments to undergo a very thorough approval process to ensure that each project meets environmental, social, political, and safety criteria. However, critics of the Jirau and Santo Antonio dam claim that many legal criteria were rubber-stamped before all questions from impacted groups had been addressed. The dam's social impacts received the majority of substantive criticism (see below). However, environmental groups noted that the fast track approval for the Madeira dams sets a dangerous precedent. Brazilian law allows for expedited licensing for eco-friendly projects described by the Worldwatch institute as "kindler, gentler dams with smaller reservoirs, designed to lessen social and environmental impacts." The Worldwatch Institute insists that no project should "fast-track the licensing of new dams in Amazonia and allow projects to circumvent Brazil's tough environmental laws".

=== Social ===
The most frequent objection is that the dam builders failed to adequately consult with indigenous peoples, as required by law. The Brazilian government indigenous protection foundation FUNAI predicts that there may be un-contacted indigenous populations in the region that will be affected by the Madeira complex. Most of the affected populations are nearest to the Jirau dam. The threat to uncontacted Indians has motivated both internal and external criticism of ESBR, the contractor responsible for building the Jirau dam. A coalition of non-governmental organizations called for dam construction to be halted, and questions were raised during annual meeting of GDF Suez. After more than 10 years in operation, no one single Indian tribe was found in the region impacted by Jirau dam.

Moreover, federal prosecutors are suing ESBR (Energia Sustentável do Brasil), the company responsible for the dam, the Brazilian Institute of Environment (IBAMA) and the Brazilian Development Bank (BNDES) for the non-accomplishment of some of the conditions previewed by the environmental license and for the indemnification for losses on the traditional fishers' revenues.

=== Environmental ===
Because both the Jirau and Santo Antonio dams are run-of-the-river projects, neither dam impounds a large reservoir. Both dams also feature significant environmental re-mediation efforts. As a consequence, there has not been strong environmental opposition to the implementation of the Madeira river complex. However, critics point out that if the fish ladders fail, "several valuable migratory fish species could suffer near-extinction as a result of the Madeira dams." Jirau's environmentally friendly design earned the plant registration under the "Clean Development Mechanism" (CDM) program of the United Nations. Jirau is the largest renewable energy plant to earn the CDM, which is awarded to innovative projects that help to solve environmental problems such as climate change.

=== Labor ===
Construction on the dam was halted on 18 March 2011 as workers rioted; setting fire to buses and destroying part of the worker housing. Wages and the treatment by security officials was attributed to the rioting. Additional security personal had to be sent to the site and construction was halted. Workers went on strike at Jirau and Santo Antonio in April 2013 after a salary increase proposal was rejected.

=== Opportunities for Bolivia ===
Bolivia has been a landlocked country since it lost its coastline to Chile in the War of the Pacific in 1884. Many Bolivians feel a deep and lasting bitterness due to this loss, and the Bolivian military continues to build and maintain an open ocean navy in Lake Titicaca, awaiting an eventual recovery of access to the sea. The Madeira river complex presents an opportunity for Bolivia because all of the hydroelectric dams would feature ship locks capable of raising and lowering oceangoing vessels. If the project is completed, "more than 4,000 km of waterways upstream from the dams in Brazil, Bolivia, and Peru would become navigable." Hence, if the project is completed, both Bolivian commercial vessels and the Bolivian navy would have access to the open ocean, and lucrative sea lanes, for the first time in 120 years.

== Killing of an environmental activist ==
The body of the Brazilian environmental activist Nilce de Souza Magalhães, also known as Nicinha, was found on 21 June 2016 in the hydro-power dam's lake of Jirau. Nicinha, leadership of MAB in Rondônia, had been missing since 7 January 2016. Her body was found only 400 m away from where she used to live. Her body was found by dam workers, with her hands and feet tied by a rope and tied to a rock. Nicinha was known in the region for bringing attention to human rights violations committed by the consortium responsible for the Jirau power plant, called Energia Sustentável do Brasil (ESBR). She was the daughter of rubber extractors who came from the Brazilian state of Acre to the city of Abuna (near Porto Velho) in Rondonia, where she lived almost 50 years and was evicted along with other fishers due to the construction of the dam. The encampment where they had lived had no access to clean water or electricity.

Nicinha made several complaints over the years, attending public hearings and events, and highlighting the serious impacts of predatory fishing activity on the Madeira River. The complaints generated two civil investigations by the Federal Prosecutor's Office and the State Prosecutor's Office on the non-implementation of the Program of Support to Fishing Activity and another of criminal character, due to data manipulation in monitoring reports.

Her killer, Edione Pessoa da Silva, who was in prison after confessing to the murder of Nicinha, escaped from the State Penitentiary "Edvan Mariano Rosendo", located in Porto Velho (RO) in April 2016.

== See also ==
- List of power stations in Brazil
- Jirau and Santo Antônio: tales of an Amazonian war (video documentary)
