= Listed buildings in Greenhalgh-with-Thistleton =

Greenhalgh-with-Thistleton is a civil parish in the Borough of Fylde, Lancashire, England. It contains five buildings that are recorded in the National Heritage List for England as designated listed buildings, all of which are listed at Grade II. This grade is the lowest of the three gradings given to listed buildings and is applied to "buildings of national importance and special interest". Other than small settlements, the parish is rural, and the listed buildings consist of three farmhouses, a cottage, and a barn.

== Buildings ==
| Name and location | Photograph | Date | Notes |
|---|---|---|---|
| Barn, Guild Farm; 53.82035°N 2.89860°W | — | 17th century | A brick barn with a roof of slate, stone-slate, and corrugated sheet. It has a broad rectangular plan, and is in two units. The barn contains a wagon entrance, a loft door, stable doors, and mullioned ventilation holes. |
| By the Way; 53.80257°N 2.88778°W | — | Late 17th century (probable) | A cottage in rendered brick with a thatched roof. It has two storeys, the original part having two bays with lean-to extensions on the right and at the rear. There is a later two-storey single-bay extension to the left. Most of the windows are casements, with sliding sash windows in the upper floor, and all the windows have ornamental external shutters. |
| Ivy House; 53.83413°N 2.90435°W | | Early 18th century (probable) | A brick farmhouse with a slate roof in two storeys. It originally was in two bays, with an additions bay added to the right, and an outshut and an extension at the rear. In the original part is a central doorway and two windows in each floor divided by mullions and transoms into 30 panes. |
| Plane Tree Farmhouse; 53.83264°N 2.90237°W | — | Early 18th century | The farmhouse is in rendered brick with a slate roof. It has two storeys and three bays, with an outshut and an extension to the rear. On the front is a gabled porch. There are three three-light windows in each floor, those in the ground floor having segmental heads. Inside is an inglenook and a bressumer. |
| Malt Kiln Farmhouse; 53.83364°N 2.90195°W | | Mid-18th century (probable) | A farmhouse in rendered brick with a slate roof in two storeys and with a symmetrical two-bay front. In the centre is an open gabled porch. The windows are 12-pane sashes. At the rear is a large stairlight. |
