= Electricity sector in Brazil =

Electricity sector of Brazil
Data
- Electricity coverage (2024): 99.8% (total), (LAC total average in 2024: 97.4%)
- Installed capacity (2024): 230,079 MW
- Share of fossil energy: 11.8%
- Share of renewable energy: 87.4%
- GHG emissions from electricity generation (2003): 20 MtCO_{2}
- Average electricity use (2007): 2,166 kWh per capita (USA: 12,300 kWh per capita)
- Distribution losses (2005): 14%

Consumption by sector (% of total)
- Residential: 34% (2006)
- Industrial: 25% (2006)
- Commercial: 22% (2006)
- Public sector: 13% (2006)
- Rural: 6% (2006)

Tariffs and financing
- Average residential tariff (US$/kW·h, 2007): 0.153; (LAC average in 2005: 0.115)
- Average industrial tariff (US$/kW·h, 2005): 0.113; (LAC average in 2005: 0.107)
- Average commercial tariff (US$/kW·h, June 2005): 0.142

Services
- Sector unbundling: Yes
- Share of private sector in generation: 10%
- Competitive supply to large users: Yes
- Competitive supply to residential users: No

Institutions
- No. of service providers: 6 main (generation), 5 main (transmission), 49 (distribution)
- Responsibility for regulation: ANEEL-Electricity Regulatory Agency
- Responsibility for policy-setting: Ministry of Mines and Energy
- Responsibility for the environment: Ministry of the Environment
- Electricity sector law: Yes (2004)
- Renewable energy law: No
- CDM transactions related to the electricity sector: 91 registered CDM project; 9,034,000 tCO_{2}e annual emissions reductions

Brazil has the largest electricity sector in Latin America. In 2024, Brazil added a substantial 10.9 GW of new power generation capacity, with a total installed capacity of 209 GW, of which nearly 85% was renewable.

The installed capacity grew from 11,000 MW in 1970 with an average yearly growth of 5.8% per year. Brazil has the largest capacity for water storage in the world, being dependent on hydroelectricity generation capacity, which meets over 60% of its electricity demand. The national grid runs at 60 Hz and is powered 83% from renewable sources. This dependence on hydropower makes Brazil vulnerable to power supply shortages in drought years, as was demonstrated by the 2001–2002 energy crisis.

In 2023, the output of Brazil's electricity system, serving over 88 million consumers, exceeded that of all other South American nations combined. Anticipated investments surpassing $100 billion by 2029 aim to expand utility-scale and distributed generation, alongside transmission and distribution projects.

The National Interconnected System (SIN) comprises the electricity companies in the South, South-East, Center-West, North-East and part of the North region. Only 3.4% of the country's electricity production is located outside the SIN, in small isolated systems located mainly in the Amazonian region.

== Electricity supply and demand ==
=== Installed capacity ===
Installed capacity by source in Brazil (2023)

- Hydro: 109,909 MW (47.8%)
- Solar: 35,739 MW (15.5%)
- Wind: 27,660 MW (12.0%)
- Natural gas: 17,613 MW (7.7%)
- Biomass: 16,923 MW (7.4%)
- Nuclear: 1,990 MW (0.9%)
- Others (oil, coal, imports): 20,328 MW (8.8%)

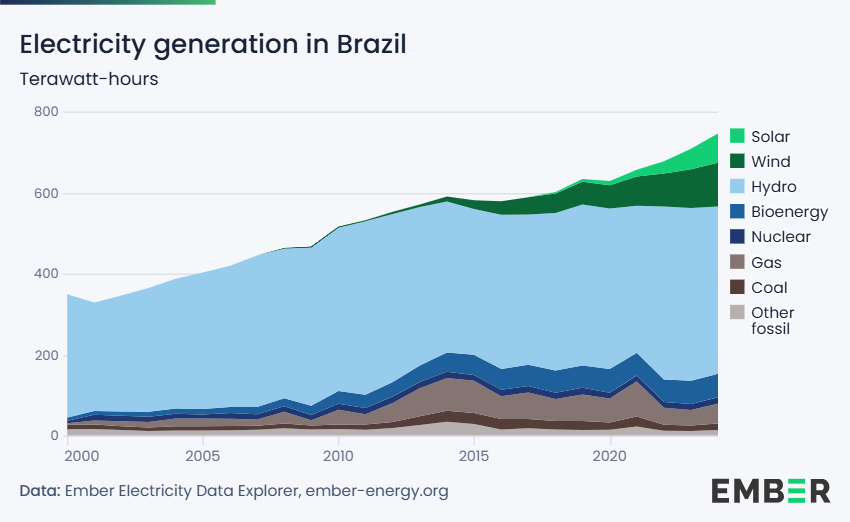
Electricity generation in Brazil per source in terawatt-hours

At the end of 2021 Brazil was the 2nd country in the world in terms of installed hydroelectric power (109.4 GW) and biomass (15.8 GW), the 7th country in the world in terms of installed wind power (21.1 GW) and the 14th country in the world in terms of installed solar power (13.0 GW) - on track to also become one of the top 10 in the world in solar energy. At the end of 2021, Brazil was the 4th largest producer of wind energy in the world (72 TWh), behind only China, USA and Germany, and the 11th largest producer of solar energy in the world (16.8 TWh).

The main characteristic of the Brazilian energy matrix is that it is much more renewable than that of the world. While in 2019 the world matrix was only 14% made up of renewable energy, Brazil's was at 45%. Petroleum and oil products made up 34.3% of the matrix; sugar cane derivatives, 18%; hydraulic energy, 12.4%; natural gas, 12.2%; firewood and charcoal, 8.8%; varied renewable energies, 7%; mineral coal, 5.3%; nuclear, 1.4%, and other non-renewable energies, 0.6%.

In the electric energy matrix, the difference between Brazil and the world is even greater: while the world only had 25% of renewable electric energy in 2019, Brazil had 83%. The Brazilian electric matrix was composed of: hydraulic energy, 64.9%; biomass, 8.4%; wind energy, 8.6%; solar energy, 1%; natural gas, 9.3%; oil products, 2%; nuclear, 2.5%; coal and derivatives, 3.3%.

Generation capacity in Brazil is still dominated by hydroelectric plants, which accounted for 77% of total installed capacity, with 24 plants above 1,000 MW. In the old days, about 88 percent of the electricity fed into the national grid is estimated to came from hydroelectric generation, with over 25% coming from a single hydropower plant, the massive 14 GW Itaipu dam facility, located between Brazil and Paraguay on the Paraná River. Natural gas generation is second in importance, representing about 10% of total capacity, close to the 12% goal for 2010 established in 1993 by the Ministry of Mines and Energy.

This reliance on abundant hydroelectric resources allegedly reduces the overall generation costs. However, this large dependence on hydropower made the country especially vulnerable to supply shortages in low-rainfall years (see The 2001–2002 crisis below).

By the end of 2016, the breakdown of generation by source was:

Source	Number of plants	Installed capacity (MW)	% Total
Hydroelectricity	1259	96,925	64.5%
Gas	156	12,965	8.6%
Oil	2200	8,877	5.9%
Biomass	504	14,001	9.3%
Nuclear	2	1,990	1.3%
Coal	13	3,389	2.3%
Wind	413	10,124	0.2%
Total installed capacity	4,707	150,338	94.3%
Contracted imports		5,850	5.7%
Available power		156,271	100%

Source: Ministry of Mines and Energy, 2016

As summarized in the table above, Brazil has two nuclear power plants, Angra 1 (657 MW) and Angra 2 (1,350 MW), both of them owned by Eletronuclear, a subsidiary of the state-owned (Mixed economy) Eletrobrás.

=== New generation projects ===
Brazil needs to add 6000 MW of capacity every year in order to satisfy growing demand from an increasing and more prosperous population. The Brazilian Ministry of Energy has decided to generate 50% of new supplies from hydropower, 30% from wind and biomass such as bagasse, and 20% from gas and other sources. Wind in the North-East is strongest during the dry season when hydropower plants produce less, so the two energy sources are seasonally complementary. While grid batteries are not generators in the traditional sense, they provide flexibility to the grid. As of 2025, Brazil has less than 1 GWh of batteries, mostly in isolated grids.

==== Hydroelectric plants ====
Brazil has an untapped hydropower potential of 180,000 MW, including about 80,000 MW in protected regions for which there are no development plans. The government expects to develop the rest by 2030. Most new hydropower plants are run-of-river plants that are less damaging to the environment, because their reservoirs are small. However, they are more vulnerable to droughts and less efficient, because only a fraction of their capacity can be used during the dry season.

The National Agency for Electricity (ANEEL) has commissioned feasibility studies for several hydroelectric plants (small, medium and large) in the period 2006–2008. These studies correspond to a total potential capacity of 31,000 MW. In 2007, Ibama, the environmental agency, gave approval for the construction of two new dams, the Jirau Dam (3,700 MW) and the Santo Antônio Dam (3,500 MW), on the Madeira River in the state of Rondônia. The bid for the Santo Antônio plant was awarded in December 2007 to Madeira Energy, with a 39% participation from state-owned Furnas, while the bid for the Jirau plant will be launched in May 2008. The government is also pursuing development of the controversial 11,000 MW Belo Monte Dam in the state of Pará, on the Xingu River. IBAMA approved Belo Monte's provisional environmental license in February 2010 despite internal uproar from technicians over incomplete data.

==== Nuclear plants ====
Also in 2007, Electronuclear was granted permission to resume construction of Angra 3, a 1,350 MW plant, and is currently in the process of selecting a site for a fourth nuclear power plant. In February 2014, Eletrobras Eletronuclear awarded contracts to begin construction, with an estimated completion date of 2018.

==== Thermoelectric plants ====
Currently, the development of gas-fired thermoelectric power is somewhat jeopardized by the lack of secure gas supplies. In fact, having a secure gas contract is a prerequisite to build a new thermoelectric plant and to participate in a new energy auction (see Energy auctions below). In order to counter the risk of unavailability of gas supplies, Brazil is in the initial stages of planning to build two LNG terminals that would likely come on-stream around 2010. However, in the meantime, several thermoelectric plants are converting their machinery to dual-fuel capacity (oil and gas).

=== Demand ===
Total electricity consumed in 2007 was 410 terawatt hour (TWh), while annual consumption per capita for the same year averaged 2,166 kWh. The share of consumption by sector was as follows:

- Residential: 40% (including 6% for the rural sector)
- Industrial: 25%
- Commercial: 22%
- Rural: 6%
- Public: 13%

Electricity demand is expected to grow an average of 3.6% in the next few years, leading to total estimated consumption of 504 TWh and average per capita consumption of 2,527 kWh.

In Brazil, capacity addition traditionally lagged behind demand growth. Electricity demand is expected to continue to grow at a quick pace. The income elasticity of demand for electricity is estimated by Eletrobras at above unity. Between 1980 and 2000, electricity demand increased on average by 5.4 percent per year while GDP grew by 2.4 percent on average per year. Investment is therefore needed to boost generation and transmission capacity because there is limited excess supply, despite the reduction in demand following the energy rationing program implemented in 2001 in response to the energy crisis.

== Access to electricity ==
Brazil, together with Chile, is the country with the highest access rate in Latin America. The power sector in Brazil serves more than 50 million customers, which corresponds to about 97% of the country's total households, who have access to reliable electricity.

== Service quality ==
=== Interruption frequency and duration ===
Interruption frequency and duration are very close to the averages for the LAC region. In 2005, the average number of interruptions per subscriber was 12.5, while duration of interruptions per subscriber was 16.5 hours. The weighted averages for LAC were 13 interruptions and 14 hours respectively.

=== Distribution losses ===
Distribution losses in 2005 were 14%, well in line with the 13.5% average for the LAC region but about double that of an OECD country such as the Great Britain, with 7% distribution losses.

== Responsibilities in the electricity sector ==
=== Policy and regulation ===
The Ministry of Energy and Mines (MME) has the overall responsibility for policy setting in the electricity sector while ANEEL, which is linked to the Ministry of Mines and Energy, is the Brazilian Electricity Regulatory Agency created in 1996 by Law 9427. ANEEL's function is to regulate and control the generation, transmission and distribution of power in compliance with the existing legislation and with the directives and policies dictated by the Central Government. The National Council for Energy Policies (CNPE), is an advisory body to the MME in charge of approving supply criteria and "structural" projects while the Electricity Industry Monitoring Committee (CMSE) monitors supply continuity and security.

ANEEL and the Ministry of Environment play almost no part in which investment projects go ahead, but they only influence how projects are executed once the decision has been taken. Both have had their bosses resign rather than supporting infrastructure projects in the Amazon.

The Operator of the National Electricity System (ONS) is a non-profit private entity created in August 1998 that is responsible for the coordination and control of the generation and transmission installations in the National Interconnected System (SIN). The ONS is under ANEEL's control and regulation.

The Power Commercialization Chamber (CCEE), successor of MAE (Mercado Atacadista de Energia Electrica), is the operator of the commercial market. The initial role of the operator was to create a single, integrated commercial electricity market, to be regulated under published rules. This role has become more active since now CCEE is in charge of the auction system. The rules and commercialization procedures that regulate CCEE's activities are approved by ANEEL.

Finally, the Power Research Company (EPE) was created in 2004 with the specific mission of developing an integrated long-term planning for the power sector in Brazil. Its mission is to carry out studies and research services in the planning of the energy sector in areas such as power, oil and natural gas and its derivates, coal, renewable energy resources and energy efficiency, among others. Its work serves as input for the planning and implementation of actions by the Ministry of Energy and Mines in the formulation of the national energy policy.

The Brazilian electricity model is fully deregulated, which allows generators to sell all of their "assured energy" via freely negotiated contracts with consumers above 3 MW or via energy auctions administered by CCEE (see energy auctions below). Under this model, distributors are required to contract 100% of their expected demand. Currently, Brazilian generation supply can be sold under four types of markets:

- "Old energy"* auction contracts (long term): approximately 41% of the 2006 market
- "New energy"* auction contracts (long term):delivery starts in 2008
- Free-market contracts (long term): approximately 27% of 2006 market
- Spot Market Sales (size uncertain)

(*The government identifies two types of generation capacity, "old energy" and "new energy". Old energy represents existing plants that were already contracted in the 1990s, while new energy refers to that energy produced by plants that have not yet been built, or by existing plants that meet certain criteria.)

=== Generation ===
In Brazil, large government-controlled companies dominate the electricity sector. Federally owned Eletrobras holds about 40% of capacity (including 50% of the Itaipu dam), with state-companies CESP, Cemig and Copel controlling 8%, 7% and 5% of generation capacity respectively.

Generation capacity is shared among the different companies as follows:

Company	Controlling shareholder	Installed capacity (MW)	% Total
Eletrobras (1)	Federal Gvt.	38,111	40%
CESP	SP State Gvt.	7,451	8%
Cemig	MG State Gvt.	6,692	7%
Copel	PR State Gvt.	4,550	5%
Tractebel Energia	GDF Suez	6,870	7%
AES Tiete	AES Corp.	2,651	3%
Others	Mostly private sector	29,969	31%
Brazil total		96,294	100%

Source: Eletrobras, CESP, Cemig, Copel, Tractebel Energia, AES Tiete, Ministry of Energy and Mines ^{(1)} Considering 6,300MW of Iguaçú

Currently, about 27 percent of the generation assets are in the hands of private investors. Considering the plants under construction, as well as the concessions and licenses already granted by ANEEL, this figure is expected to grow up to 31 percent in the medium term and to reach almost 44 percent over 5–6 years. Private capital participation in the generation business will likely represent 50 percent of the installed capacity in the years to come.

=== Transmission ===
Brazil's transmission system is growing in importance since adequate transmission capacity is essential to manage the effects of regional droughts, allowing to move power from areas where rainfall is plentiful. As a matter of fact, the rationing that occurred in Brazil in 2001–2002 (see The 2001–2002 crisis below), could have largely been averted if there had been adequate transmission capacity between the south (excess supply) and the southeast (severe deficit).

Transmission has remained almost exclusively under government control through both federal (Eletrobras) and state companies (mainly Sao-Paulo-CTEEP, Minas Gerais-Cemig, and Parana-Copel) until recently. However, under the new sector regulatory model, there are about 40 transmission concessions in Brazil. Most of them are still controlled by the government, with subsidiaries under federal company Eletrobras holding 69% of total transmission lines.

Company	Controlling shareholder	Concession area	Transmission lines (km)
Pure transmission companies			
CTEEP	ISA (Colombia)	São Paulo State	11,837
Terna Participacoes	Terna (Italy)	Goias, Bahia, Brazilian, Maranhao	2,447
Companies with significant transmission operations			
Cemig	State of MG	Minas Gerais	21,184
Copel	State of Parana	Parana	7,045
Eletrosul, Furnas, Eletronorte, Chesf	Eletrobras	Throughout Brazil	56,384

Source: Bear Stearns 2007

The Brazilian Energy Research Agency (EPE) has published a 10-year expansion plan outlining a projected investment of US$ 20 billion in the electricity transmission sector by 2029. This plan specifies allocating US$ 14 billion to the expansion of transmission lines and US$ 6 billion to the expansion of substations.

=== Distribution ===
In Brazil, there are 49 utilities with distribution concessions and about 64% of Brazilian distribution assets are controlled by private sector companies. The following table lists Brazil's most important distribution companies:

Company	Controlling shareholder	Concession area	Sales (GWh)	Sales (%)
Cemig	MG State Govt	Minas Gerais	20,221	40%
Enel	Enel	São Paulo city	31,642	12.5%
CPFL	VBC Group	São Paulo State outside São Paulo city	36,135	14.3%
Copel	PR State Govt.	Parana	17,524	6.9%
Energias do Brasil	EDP	São Paulo, Rio Grande do Sul	15,863	6.3%
Celesc	SC State Gvt	Santa Catarina	15,157	6.0%
Light	EDF	Río de Janeiro City	19,139	7.6%
Equatorial (Cemar)	GP Investimentos/Pactual	Maranhao	2,793	1.1%
Ampla (Cerj)	Enersis	Rio de Janeiro	6,832	2.7%
Others	Mostly private sector		87,594	34.6%
Brazil total			252,900	100.0%

Source: Bear Stearns, 2007

In 2023, Brazil's power distribution sector, dominated by private, foreign-owned firms like Spain's Iberdrola and Italy's ENEL, receives about $4 billion in investments annually. This funding predominantly supports expansion (69%), with the remainder allocated to improvements (19%) and network renewals (12%).

== Renewable electricity resources ==
In 2023, solar power, including distributed generation, became Brazil's second largest electricity source, surpassing wind power. In 2021, utility-scale solar energy saw a 40.9% increase, while distributed solar generation grew by 84%. Investments in utility-scale solar projects have surpassed $20 billion, with an additional $1 billion invested in distributed solar generation since 2012.

By 2021, Brazil was the second country in the world in terms of installed hydroelectric power (109.4 GW) and biomass (15.8 GW), the 7th country in the world in terms of installed wind power (21.1 GW) and the 14th country in the world in terms of installed solar power (13.0 GW) - on track to also become one of the top 10 in the world in solar energy. From 2013, Brazil started to deploy wind energy on a large scale, and from 2017, it started to deploy solar energy on a large scale, to diversify its energy portfolio and avoid the problems arising from dependence on hydroelectricity.

By the end of 2023, Brazil's wind power generation is set to hit 29 GW, according to the Brazilian Wind Power Association (ABEEOLICA). With 890 wind farms across 12 states, 85% of these are in the Northeast. By 2028, installed capacity is expected to exceed 44 GW, comprising 13.2% of the country's electricity matrix.

Brazil's gross wind resource potential was estimated, in 2019, to be about 500 GW (this, only onshore), enough energy to meet three times the country's current demand.

=== PROINFA ===
In 2002, the government of Brazil created a Program to Foster Alternative Sources of Electric Power (PROINFA). The program aims to increase the participation of wind power sources, biomass sources and small hydropower systems in the supply of the Brazilian grid system through Autonomous Independent Producers (PIA). The medium to long-term objective (i.e. 20 years) of the program is that the defined sources supply 15% of the annual market growth until they reach 10% of the nation's annual electric power demand/total consumption.

== History ==
=== Early power schemes ===
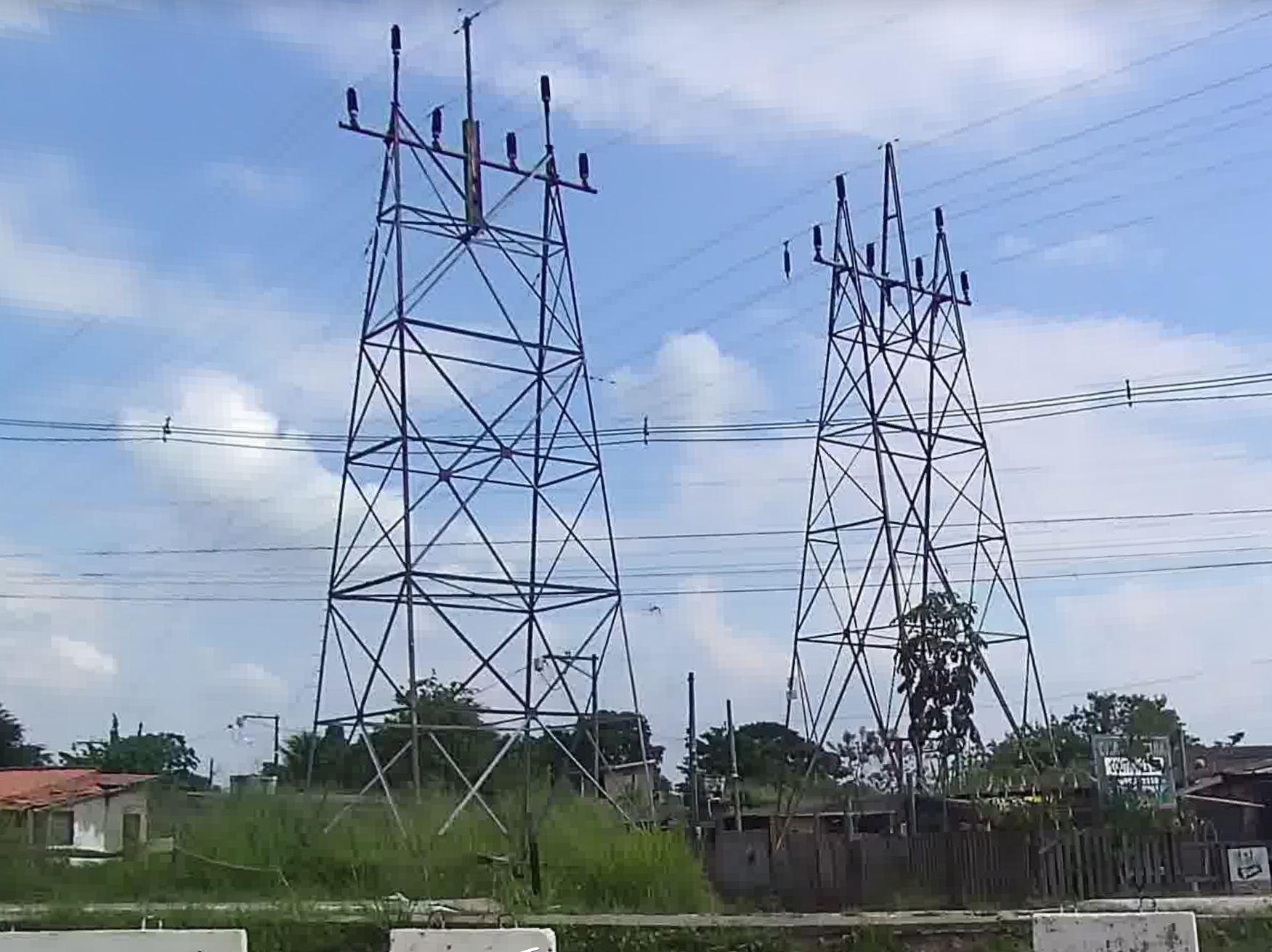
Transmission towers of the Piabanha - Niteroi power line from 1908

One of the first hydroelectric plants opened in 1889 at the Paraibuna river in Minas Gerais with a total power output of 375 kW. Afterwards, several towns and municipalities built small hydroelectric power stations for their local supply. The first regional transmission grid in South America appeared in 1908, when two hydroelectric power stations in Fontes Velha and Piabanha were inaugurated and connected to Rio de Janeiro and Niteroi by transmission lines. In 1910 the Itatinga power station in Sao Paulo opened and supplied the city of São Paulo and Santos with electricity. The two towers of the power line crossing over the Santos estuary had been the tallest electricity pylons in South America for a long period of time.

=== Situation prior to the reforms: the state-dominated model ===
The power sector in Brazil was essentially in government's hands until the early 1990s. The sector had seen remarkable development in the 1970s. However, by the late 1980s, the state-ownership model was on the verge of collapse. This delicate situation was the result of heavily subsidized tariffs and a revenue shortfall in the sector of about US$35 billion, which led to the delay in the construction of about 15 large hydro plants due to lack of funds for investment. Efforts to address the deterioration of the sector were not successful, a situation that further intensified the need for deep reforms. A major commitment was made by the then President of Brazil, Fernando Henrique Cardoso, to carry out a substantial reform of the Brazilian electricity sector. The first reforms introduced in the power sector were aimed to allow the participation of private capital and also to improve its economic situation.

=== 1990s reforms ===
The Project for Restructuring the Brazilian Electric Sector, RESEB, which laid down the first steps for the implementation of the power sector reform, was initiated in 1996 during the administration of Cardoso. The objective of the reform was to build a more competitive power sector with the creation of a level playing field for private sector participation. In addition, state-owned utilities and assets were privatized. Although transmission assets were not privatized, most of the expansion of the transmission network has been carried out by private capital. This reform also led to the creation, in 1996, of ANEEL (Brazil's National Electricity Regulatory Agency), a quasi-independent regulatory body in charge of overseeing the electricity sector. However, the main restructuring steps were taken with the enactment of the 1998 Law (Law 9648/98). Those steps included the creation of an independent operator of the national transmission system (ONS) and an operator of the commercial market (MAE), which did not become operational until 2001.

As a result of the reforms of the power sector, new capital was attracted, both in terms of privatization and greenfield projects. Some of the state-owned generation capacity was acquired by foreign investors such as Tractebel, AES, Prisma Energy, El Paso and Duke, which became significant producers. In addition, local investors such as industrial groups, large customers, utilities and pension funds also invested heavily in the national generation sector. Other companies such as EdF (Électricité de France), Endesa and Chilectra focused on the distribution segment, a segment in which privatization brought improved quality of service and a reduction of theft, non-payments and technical losses.

However, the reforms were not successful in preventing the energy crisis that was to unfold in 2001. Installed capacity expanded by only 28 percent between 1990 and 1999, whereas electricity demand increased by 45 percent. In 1999, as the power shortage was already foreseen, the Cardoso Administration made efforts to increase private investment in the electricity sector through a Priority Thermal Power Program (PPT) that aimed at the expeditious construction of more than 40 gas-fired thermal plants. Unfortunately, the needed investment did not materialize and the crisis became unavoidable.

=== 2001–2002 crisis and the government's response ===
Brazil was faced with one of the most serious energy crises in its history in 2001–2002. The crisis was the direct result of a sequence of a few years drier than average in a country with over 80% of hydroelectric generation capacity. Additionally, several delays in the commissioning of new generation plants and transmission problems in the third circuit from the Itaipu hydropower plant accounted for a third of the energy deficit. Reservoir levels reached such low levels that supply could not be ensured for more than four months.

It was soon clear that strict demand reduction programs would be needed to avoid widespread blackouts. In June 2001, the government created the Crisis Management Board (CGE), chaired by Cardoso himself. The CGE received special powers among which was the authority to set up special tariffs, implement compulsory rationing and blackouts, and bypass normal bidding procedures of the purchase of new plant equipment. Instead of resorting to rolling blackouts, the government chose to apply a quota system. Quotas were established for all the consumers based on historical and target consumption level, applying bonuses for consumption well below the prescribed level, penalties for over-consumption. The government's goal of reducing historical consumption levels by at least 20% for an eight-month period was successfully achieved, with the government having to pay over US$200 million in bonuses to residential, industrial, and commercial customers. This achievement allowed the system to overcome that long period without blackouts and brownouts and proved the potential of demand-side management and energy efficiency efforts, which were able to create a virtual capacity of 4,000 MW, helping the country to bridge the supply demand gap in a very economic way. In addition, the government launched a program for contracting emergency generation capacity, with bids for a total of 2,100MW of new thermal capacity accepted.

However, the crisis affected numerous actors. Generators and distributors experienced a 20% reduction in their revenues due to the contraction in consumption. This situation was eventually addressed by an increase of tariffs approved by the government. The financial situation of distributors was also damaged, with customers also suffering from the increase in electricity prices (140% in nominal terms between 1995 and 2002).

=== 2003–2004 reforms: energy auctions ===
In January 2003, the new administration led by Luiz Inácio Lula da Silva took over among criticism of the reforms introduced in the electricity sector by the administration of Cardoso, supporting a model in which the system should be fully regulated. The pending privatizations of three generation subsidiaries of the large state-owned utility, Eletrobras, were stopped. However, despite initial expectations, the new administration opted for a model that clearly aims to attract long-term private investment to the sector and that heavily relies on competition. In addition, the existing institutions were preserved and in some cases strengthened, with a new company, EPE, created with the specific mission of developing an integrated long-term planning for the power sector in Brazil.

The new legislative framework was defined by Law 10,848/2004, which established clear, stable and transparent rules aimed at ensuring supply and the continuous expansions of the intrinsic sector activities (generation, transmission and distribution). The expansion was linked to a fair return on investments and to universal service access, together with tariff adjustments. Decree 5,081/2004 approved the regulatory framework for the power sector, specifying specific provisions to achieve the objectives of the reform. One of the defining elements of the model adopted by the new administration is the establishment of energy auctions as the main procurement mechanism for distribution companies to acquire energy to serve their captive consumers. This initiative assisted in the introduction of competition in the power sector and also helped to address some of the existing market imperfections. Under this system, auctions of capacity from new generation projects will be held three to five years in advance of delivery dates. The Ministry of Mines and Energy wants to ensure that the totality of future expansion needs is met and that plants are only built once they have won bids in energy auctions and are guaranteed long-term contracts. The first auction was held in December 2004, with contracts for a total of about 40 GW traded.

== Tariffs and subsidies ==
=== Tariffs ===
Average electricity tariffs for the different sectors in 2007 were as follows:

- Residential: 15.3 US¢/kWh
- Industrial: 11.3 US¢/kWh
- Commercial: 14.2 US¢/kWh
- Rural: 9.1 US¢/kWh

== Investment and financing ==
In the last 20 years, Brazil has been one of the main recipients of private capital investment in its power sector. Total investment by private actors in the power sector between 1994 and 2006 amounted to US$56,586 million in 124 projects. However, despite Brazil's deregulation and higher tariffs in the "new energy" auction system, investment, particularly in generation, has slowed significantly. This situation is not considered to be the result of concerns about the regulatory model or auction pricing caps, but it reflects the lack of available projects. The existing delays in granting environmental licenses and the uncertainties on the Bolivian gas supply, explain to a great extent the lack of hydroelectric and gas-fired thermoelectric projects respectively.

The investment required in power generation over the next 10 years is R$40 billion or around US$24.2 billion (April 29, 2008). This high investment will only be realized if the government succeeds in attracting greater private-sector investment.

== Summary of private participation in the electricity sector ==
In Brazil, large government-controlled companies dominate the electricity sector. Federally owned Eletrobras holds about 40% of capacity (including 50% of Itaipu), with state-companies CESP, Cemig and Copel controlling 8%, 7% and 5% of generation capacity respectively. About 27% of generation assets are currently in the hands of private investors.

Transmission, it has remained almost exclusively under government control through both federal (Eletrobras) and state companies (mainly Sao-Paulo-CTEEP, Minas Gerais-Cemig, and Parana-Copel) until recently. However, under the new sector regulatory model, there are about 40 transmission As for distribution, there are 49 utilities with distribution concessions and about 64% of distribution assets are controlled by private sector companies.

Activity	Private participation (%)
Generation	10%
Transmission	mostly public
Distribution	64%

== Electricity and the environment ==
=== Responsibility for the environment ===
The Ministry of the Environment holds the environmental responsibilities in Brazil. One of its associated institutions is Ibama, the Brazilian Institute for the Environment and Renewable Natural Resources, which is in charge of executing the environmental policies dictated by the Ministry regarding environmental licensing; environmental quality control; authorization of the use of natural resources; and environmental monitoring and control among others.

=== Greenhouse gas emissions ===
OLADE (Latin American Energy Association) estimated that CO_{2} emissions from electricity production in 2003 were 20 million tons of CO_{2}, which corresponds to less than 7% of total emissions from the energy sector. This low contribution to emissions from electricity production in comparison with other countries in the region is due to the high share of hydroelectric generation.

=== CDM projects in electricity ===
Brazil is host to the largest number of CDM projects in the Latin America region. Registered projects represent 40% of the total in the region and account for 45% of Certified Emission Reductions (CERs) (up to 2012).

As for the power sector, there were 91 projects registered in March 2008, adding up to an estimated total of 9 million tons of CO_{2} per year. The distribution of projects by category is as follows:

Project type	Number of projects	ktonCO_{2}/year
Biomass energy	38	1,860
Energy efficiency industry	1	49
Energy efficiency own generation	1	90
Energy distribution	1	54
Fossil fuel switch	6	139
Hydroelectricity	23	1,013
Landfill gas	17	5,660
Wind	4	170
Total	91	9,034

Source: UNFCCC

== Energy costing of Brazilian electricity ==
An exergoeconomic assessment accounting for the total and non-renewable unit exergy costs and specific CO_{2} emissions of Brazilian electricity is performed by Flórez-Orrego et al. (2014), comprising thermal, nuclear, hydro, wind farms and biomass-fired power plants. The analysis starts from the fuel obtainment and continues through the different stages of construction, fuel transportation and processing, operation and decommissioning of the plant, with electricity generation as the desired output. This approach allows the calculation of direct CO_{2} emissions as well as the upstream and downstream emissions, which play an important role in some technologies. In this way, a better comparison between the utilization of different fuels in the electricity generation can be achieved. An iterative calculation procedure is used to determine the unit exergy costs of electricity and processed fuels, since both electricity and processed fuel are used in their own production routes.

As it was expected, fossil-fired power plants presents the highest specific CO_{2} emissions, with the coal-fired power plants leading the group. However, even though fossil-fired power plants presents the most marked environmental impacts, their total unit exergy costs are much lower than that presented by sugar cane bagasse-fired power plants. This shows that, although almost renewable, the typical configurations of sugar cane bagasse-fired power plants are far from being efficient technologies. Hydro and wind farms present the lowest specific CO_{2} emissions as well as the lowest unit exergy cost. Due to the high participation of renewable sources in the production of electricity (near to 89% of the total), Brazilian electricity mix emissions are found to be 7.5 and 11.8 times lower than Europe and World electricity mixes. Also, owed to the higher efficiency of hydroelectric power plants, which contribute to the major part of the electricity generation in Brazil, the total unit exergy cost is lower, and thus, exergy efficiency of electricity generation is higher if compared with countries based on fossil fuels for electricity generation.

Apparently, total exergy cost of wind and natural-gas fired technologies are almost the same, but contrarily to the wind power plants, the non-renewable unit exergy costs of NG-fired power plants is practically equal to the total cost. This result is a consequence of the efficiency assumed for wind power plants. If energy storage is to be taken into account for intermittent technologies such as wind farms, the total exergy cost could be slightly increased. The upstream and downstream CO_{2} emissions in the coal route represent a very small part of the total CO_{2} emissions, if compared with the direct emissions of coal burning in the power plant. Finally, it is pointed out that controversies related to the flooding dams of vast zones with complex ecosystems should be carefully analysed since, according to the results reported by Dones et al., the GHG emissions could be increased up to achieve emission levels comparable to those of gas combined cycles power plants.

== External assistance ==
=== Inter-American Development Bank ===
As of 2008, the Inter-American Development Bank (IDB) was supporting several projects and contributing to various technical assistance initiatives in the power sector in Brazil. The most relevant projects with financing from the IDB are:

- The Renewable Energy Service Delivery Project is a technical cooperation that seeks to implement several pilot projects that demonstrate three promising, private-sector-led business models to provide renewable energy services to isolated communities in Brazil. The IDB supports this US$45 million technical assistance with US$2.25 million.
- The Celpa Capital Investment Program aims to expand and improve Celpa's distribution electrical system allowing the Company to (i) provide electricity to new customers mostly in rural areas; (ii) allow productivity gains and reduce costs and (iii) improve quality and reliability of its network distribution. The IDB supports this US$400 million project with a US$75 million loan.
- In February 2008, the IDB approved a US$95.5 million loan for the ATE III Transmission Project, a US$402 million project for the development, construction, erection, commissioning, operation and maintenance of approximately 459-kilometer transmission lines from the State of Pará to the State of Tocantins.

=== World Bank ===
As of 2008, the World Bank was supporting three rural poverty reduction projects that include the provision of access to electricity services:

- Rural Poverty Reduction Project in Pernambuco: US$60 million loan (10% electricity component)
- Rural Poverty Reduction Project in the State of Ceara: US$50 million loan (10% electricity component)
- Bahia State Integrated Project – Rural Poverty: US$54.35 million (16% electricity component)

== Sources ==
- Economist Intelligence Unit, 2007. Industry Briefing. Brazil: Energy and electricity forecast. Aug 22, 2007
- Economist Intelligence Unit, 2008. Industry Briefing. Brazil: Energy and electricity profile. Jan 30, 2008
- Millán, J. 2006. Entre el mercado y el estado. Tres décadas de reformas en el sector eléctrico de América Latina. Chapter 3:La reforma en Brasil. Inter-American Development Bank.
- "Capacidade Instalada de Geração Elétrica. Brasil e Mundo (2016)". Ministry of Mines and Energy. 2017. Archived from the original on 27 October 2017.
- World Bank, 2007.Closing the Electricity Supply-Demand Gap. Case Study: Brazil.

== See also ==
- 2009 Brazil and Paraguay blackout
- Economy of Brazil
- Energy policy of Brazil
- Ethanol fuel in Brazil
- Environment of Brazil
- History of Brazil
- Irrigation in Brazil
- Water supply and sanitation in Brazil
- Water resources management in Brazil
