= Karjan =

Karjan કરજણ
- Town
- Location in Gujarat, India Karjan (India)
- Coordinates: 22°03′10.95″N 73°07′24.65″E
- Country: India
- State: Gujarat
- District: Vadodara

Government
  - Body: Municipality

Population (2011)
  - Total: 30,405

Languages
  - Official: Gujarati, Hindi
- Time zone: UTC+5:30 (IST)
- PIN: 391240
- Telephone code: 02666
- Vehicle registration: GJ-06
- Sex ratio: 958 ♂/♀
- Website: gujaratindia.com

Karjan is a city and a municipality in Vadodara district in the Indian state of Gujarat.It is a junction of Indian railway.Karjan is known for Shri Shankheshwar Parshwanath Jain Tirth at Anastu and Sumeru Navkar Jain Tirth - The Golden Temple. Karjan is Famous for its Saree Market where many people comes for purchase from various places.Karjan is also famous for its Snacks Like samosa, Khaman, Sev-Khamni, Gota, etc.Mainly Two markets in Karjan which are Nava bazar and Juna bazar in which Nava bazar is biggest market which has APMC MARKET.

== Demographics ==
As of the 2001 India census, Karjan City had a population of 30,405. 52% of the population was male, and 48% was female. The average literacy rate is 91%, higher than the national average of 60.5%. In Karjan City, 37% of the population is under 10 years of age.

Karjan City is divided into Juna Bazar and Nava Bazar. National Highway 48 passes through Juna Bazar.

== Education ==
There are 21 schools in Karjan, among them are:

- Manav Kendra Gyan Mandir School
- Shah N.B. Sarvajanic High School
- Saraswati Vidhyalaya
- Karjan Public School
- Sabari High School
- Chinmay International school
- Dhayan Vidhayalay
- Aarya Bhumi Vidhyalaya
- Sufi Sanit Faiz Academy School (Kalla)
- New Rays English Medium School
- Shah Engineering Classes, Karjan

== Industry ==
It has now developed into an industrial hub with major industrial companies setting up manufacturing bases in the region including:

- Cosmo Films Ltd
- TTK Prestige
- Tbea
- Jindal Rail
- Saurer Textile Solutions Pvt Ltd

== Sports ==
Munaf Patel (Indian cricketer) is from Ikhar . Soham bhatt (Indian kho kho) player From karjan .
