= By the Way, Greenhalgh-with-Thistleton =

By the Way
- Location within Lancashire
- 53.80257°N 2.88778°W
- Location: Greenhalgh-with-Thistleton, Lancashire, England

History
- Built: late 17th century

Site notes
- Area: Borough of Fylde

Listed Building – Grade II
- Designated: 11 June 1986
- Reference no.: 1072017

By the Way is a historic building in Greenhalgh-with-Thistleton, Lancashire, England. It is believed to date to the late 17th century, and has been designated a Grade II listed building by Historic England. The property is located on the A585 Fleetwood Road.

The building is a cottage in rendered brick with a thatched roof. It has two storeys, the original part having two bays with lean-to extensions on the right and at the rear. There is a later two-storey single-bay extension to the left. Most of the windows are casements, with sliding sash windows in the upper floor, and all the windows have ornamental external shutters.

== See also ==
- Listed buildings in Greenhalgh-with-Thistleton
