= BTW (company) =

Chinese electronic component manufacturer

Baoding Tianwei Baobian Electric Co., Ltd.
- Industry: Power engineering, electrical equipment manufacturing
- Headquarters: Baoding, Hebei, China
- Website: btwelectric.com

Baoding Tianwei Baobian Electric Co., Ltd., commonly known as BTW, is a Chinese manufacturer of power transformers and other electrical equipment. Along with competitors Tebian Electric Apparatus (TBEA) and the XD Group, it is among the major manufacturers of transformers in China.

The company is engaged in manufacturing of wind turbines. In 2009, a wind power turbine subsidiary of the TWBB won a 300 million RMB contract to provide 33 units of wind turbines to the Zhuozi wind farm in Inner Mongolia, the first wind turbine deal for TWBB.
