= Southern Hami–Zhengzhou UHVDC =

Power transmission line

Hami–Zhengzhou UHVDC Transmission Project

Location
- Country: China
- Province: Yunnan, Guangdong
- General direction: west-east
- From: Hami, Xinjiang
- Passes through: Xinjiang, Gansu, Shaanxi, Ningxia, Shanxi and Henan provinces
- To: Zhengzhou, Henan

Ownership information
- Owner: State Grid Corporation of China
- Operator: Northwest China Grid Company

Construction information
- Substation manufacturer: ABB
- Construction started: 2012
- Commissioned: January 2014

Technical information
- Type: overhead transmission line
- Current type: Ultra HVDC
- Total length: 2,210 km (1,370 mi)
- Capacity: 8,000 MW
- DC voltage: ±800 kV
- No. of poles: 2

The Southern Hami–Zhengzhou UHVDC is an ultra high-voltage direct current power transmission line from north-west to central China.

== Background ==
It is the first ultra high-voltage project implemented by the Northwest China Grid Company, a subsidiary of the State Grid Corporation of China. Construction started on 13 May 2012. It went into operation in January 2014. Expected cost was 23.4 billion yuan.

== Design ==
The line was designed and built by several different Chinese companies. Converter transformers and components were supplied by ABB, by XD Group, and by Siemens.

== Operation ==
The transmission line starts at the Hami Nanhu converter station next to the Dananhu Power Station in Xinjiang and runs through Xinjiang, Gansu, Shaanxi, Ningxia, Shanxi and Henan provinces to Zhengzhou converter station in Henan. Its total length is 2,210 kilometres (1,370 mi). The line operates at ±800 kV voltage and is designed to have a transmission capacity of 8,000 MW, the highest in the world.

=== Coordinates ===
- Hami converter station 42°35′20″N 93°27′46″E
- Zhengzhou converter station 34°48′46″N 114°03′24″E
