= Run-of-the-river hydroelectricity =

Hydroelectric power station

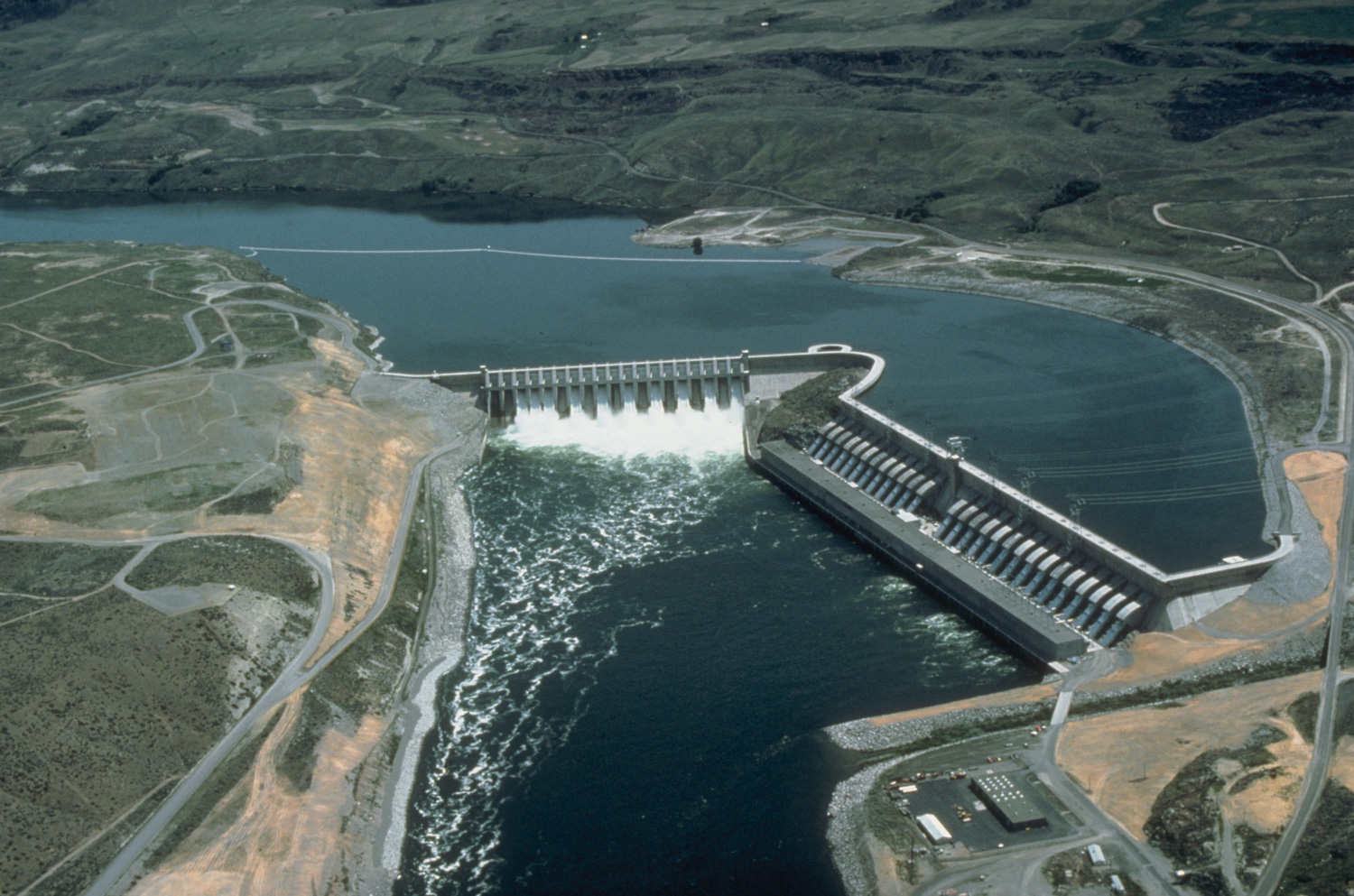
Chief Joseph Dam near Bridgeport, Washington, US, is a major run-of-the-river station without a sizeable reservoir.

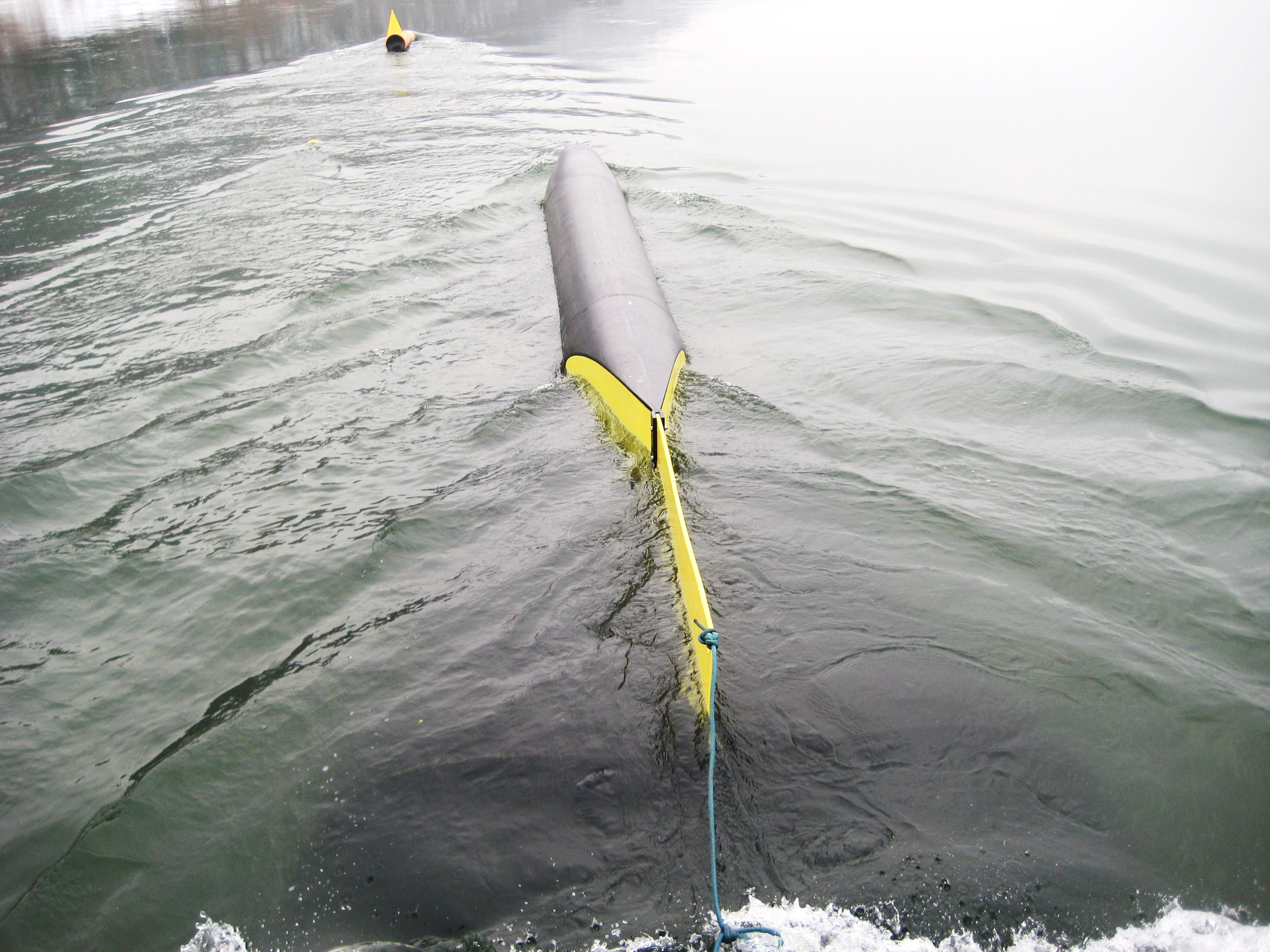
A small and floating run-of-the-river power plant in Austria.

Run-of-river hydroelectricity (ROR) or run-of-the-river hydroelectricity is a type of hydroelectric generation plant whereby little or no water storage is provided. Run-of-the-river power plants may have no water storage at all or a limited amount of storage, in which case the storage reservoir is referred to as pondage. A plant without pondage is subject to seasonal river flows, so the plant will operate as an intermittent energy source. Conventional hydro uses reservoirs, which regulate water for flood control, dispatchable electrical power, and the provision of fresh water for agriculture.

== Concept ==
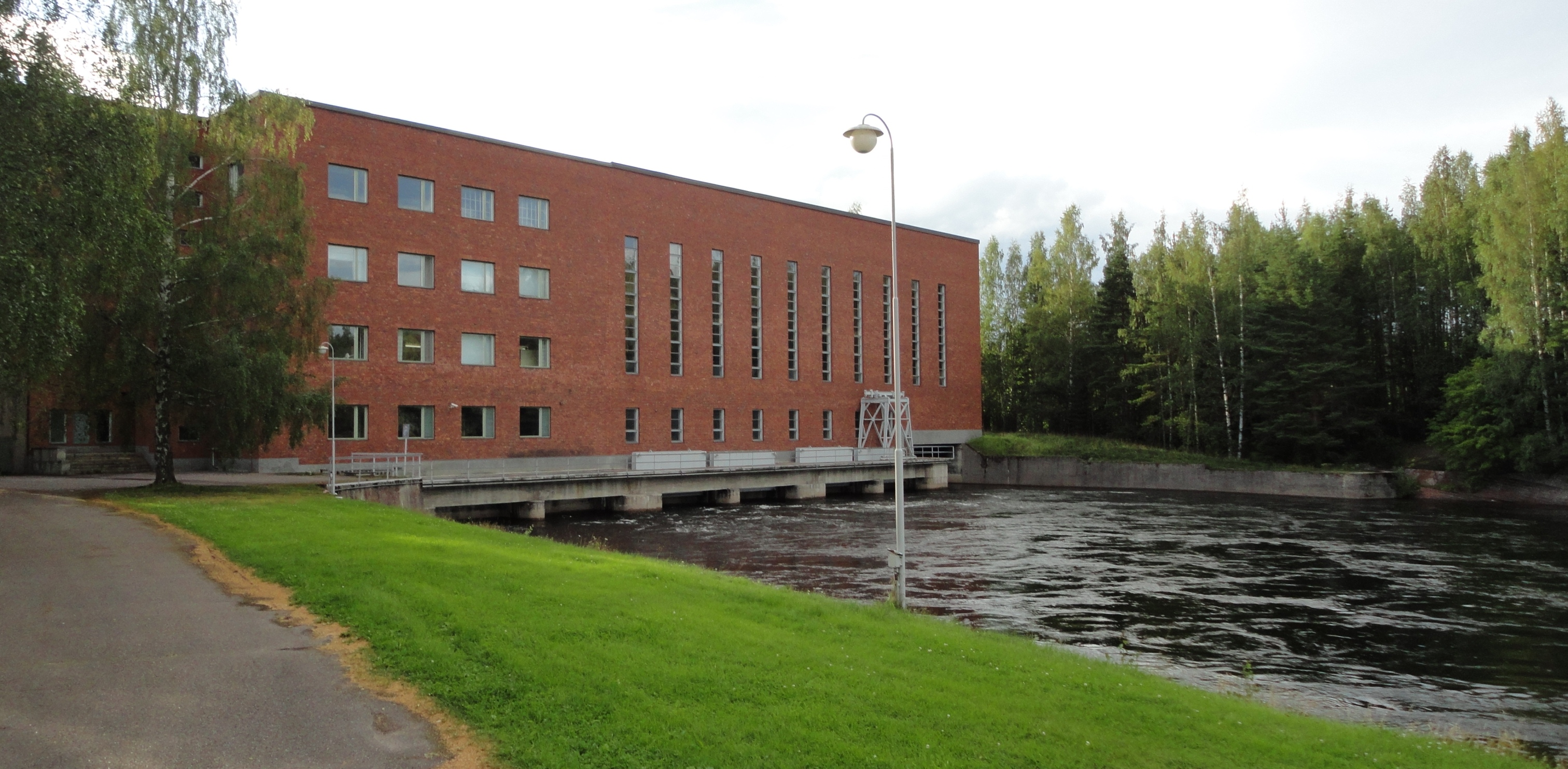
Mankala Power Station along the Kymi River in Iitti, Finland

Run-of-the-river, or ROR, hydroelectricity is considered ideal for streams or rivers that can sustain a minimum flow or those regulated by a lake or reservoir upstream.

A small dam is usually built to create a headpond ensuring that there is enough water entering the penstock pipes that lead to the turbines, which are at a lower elevation. Projects with pondage, as opposed to those without pondage, can store water for daily load demands. In general, projects divert some or most of a river's flow (up to 95% of mean annual discharge) through a pipe and/or tunnel leading to electricity-generating turbines, then return the water back to the river downstream.

Run-of-the-river projects are dramatically different in design and appearance from conventional hydroelectric projects. Traditional hydroelectric dams store enormous quantities of water in reservoirs, sometimes flooding large tracts of land. In contrast, run-of-river projects do not have the disadvantages associated with reservoirs and so cause fewer environmental impacts.

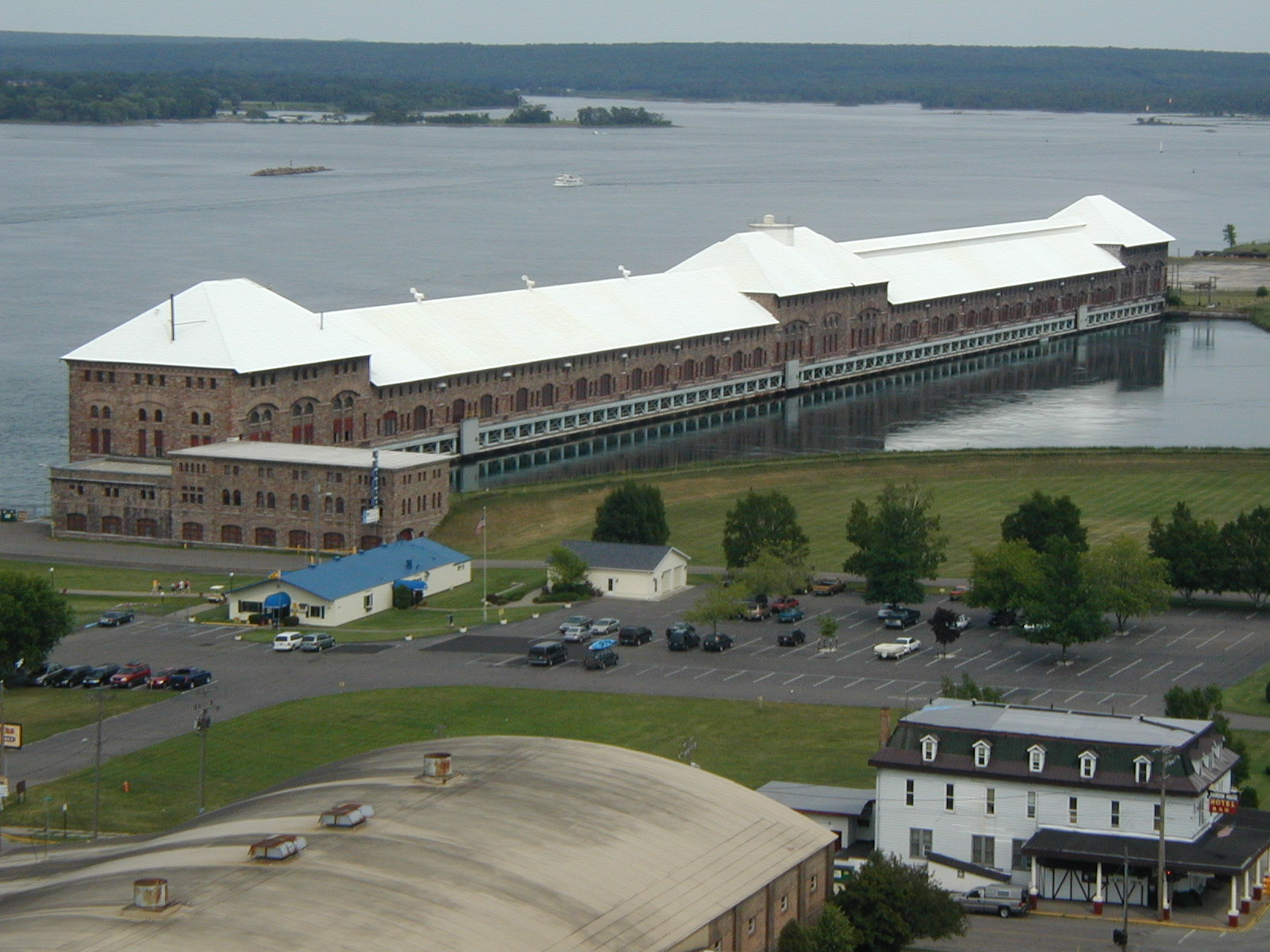
Edison Sault Power Canal—run of the river, in Sault Ste. Marie, Michigan, US.

The use of the term "run-of-the-river" for power projects varies around the world. Some may consider a project run-of-the-river if power is produced with no water storage, but limited storage is considered run-of-the-river by others. Developers may mislabel a project run-of-the-river to soothe public perception about its environmental or social effects. The European Network of Transmission System Operators for Electricity distinguishes run-of-the-river and pondage hydropower plants, which can hold enough water to allow generation for up to 24 hours (reservoir capacity / generating capacity ≤ 24 hours), from reservoir hydropower plants, which hold far more than 24 hours of generation without pumps. The Bureau of Indian Standards describes run-of-the-river hydroelectricity as:

A power station utilizing the run of the river flows for generation of power with sufficient pondage for supplying water for meeting diurnal or weekly fluctuations of demand. In such stations, the normal course of the river is not materially altered.

Many of the larger run-of-the-river projects have been designed to a scale and generating capacity rivaling some traditional hydroelectric dams. For example, the Beauharnois Hydroelectric Generating Station in Quebec is rated at 1,853 MW (Megawatts). Some run-of-the-river projects are downstream of other dams and reservoirs. The reservoir was not built by the project but takes advantage of the water supplied by it. An example would be the 1995 1,436 MW La Grande-1 generating station. Previous upstream dams and reservoirs were part of the 1980s James Bay Project.

There are also small and somewhat-mobile forms of a run-of-the-river power plants. One example is the so-called electricity buoy, a small floating hydroelectric power plant. Like most buoys, it is anchored to the ground, in this case in a river. The energy within the moving water propels a power generator and thereby creates electricity. Prototypes by commercial producers are generating power on the Middle Rhine river in Germany and on the Danube river in Austria.

== Major types ==
The advantages and disadvantages of run-of-river dams depends on the type, the following sections generally refer to Dam-Toe unless otherwise stated. These are listed in order of least impact to most impact, as well as (on average) requisite project size.

=== Dam-Toe ===
Dam-toe has no flow regulation and utilizes the natural flow of the river to turn the turbines. Electricity generation is heavily dependent on river flow.

=== Diversion Weir ===
Diversion Weir has very little flow regulation, which is generally used to cover exclusively short-term peak times electricity demand. Diversion Weir is also heavily dependent on the natural river flow.

=== Pondage ===
Similar to a regular dam, water is stored from lull periods to be used during peak-times. This allows for the pondage dams to provide for the regulation of daily and/or weekly flows depending on location.

== Advantages ==
When developed with care to footprint size and location, run-of-the-river hydro projects can create sustainable energy minimizing impacts to the surrounding environment and nearby communities. Run-of-the-river harnesses the natural potential energy of water by eliminating the need to burn coal or natural gas to generate the electricity needed by consumers and industry. Advantages include:

=== Cleaner power and fewer greenhouse gases ===
Like all hydro-electric power, run-of-the-river harnesses the natural potential energy of water by eliminating the need to burn coal or natural gas to generate the electricity needed by consumers and industry. Moreover, run-of-the-river hydroelectric plants do not have reservoirs, thus eliminating the methane and carbon dioxide emissions caused by the decomposition of organic matter in the reservoir of a conventional hydroelectric dam. That is a particular advantage in tropical countries, where methane generation can be a problem.

=== Less flooding ===
Without a reservoir, flooding of the upper part of the river does not take place. As a result, people remain living at or near the river and existing habitats are not flooded. Any pre-existing pattern of flooding will continue unaltered, which presents a flood risk to the facility and downstream areas.

=== Low-Impact implementation ===
Due to their low impact, run-of-the-river dams can be implemented in existing irrigation dams with little to no change in the local fluvial ecosystem.

== Disadvantages ==
=== "Unfirm" power ===
Run-of-the-river power is considered an "unfirm" source of power: a run-of-the-river project has little or no capacity for energy storage and so cannot co-ordinate the output of electricity generation to match consumer demand. It thus generates much more power when seasonal river flows are high (spring freshet), and depending on location, much less during drier summer months or frozen winter months.

Depending on location and type, the plant will most likely have a lower head of water than from a dam, and will thus generate less power.

=== Availability of sites ===
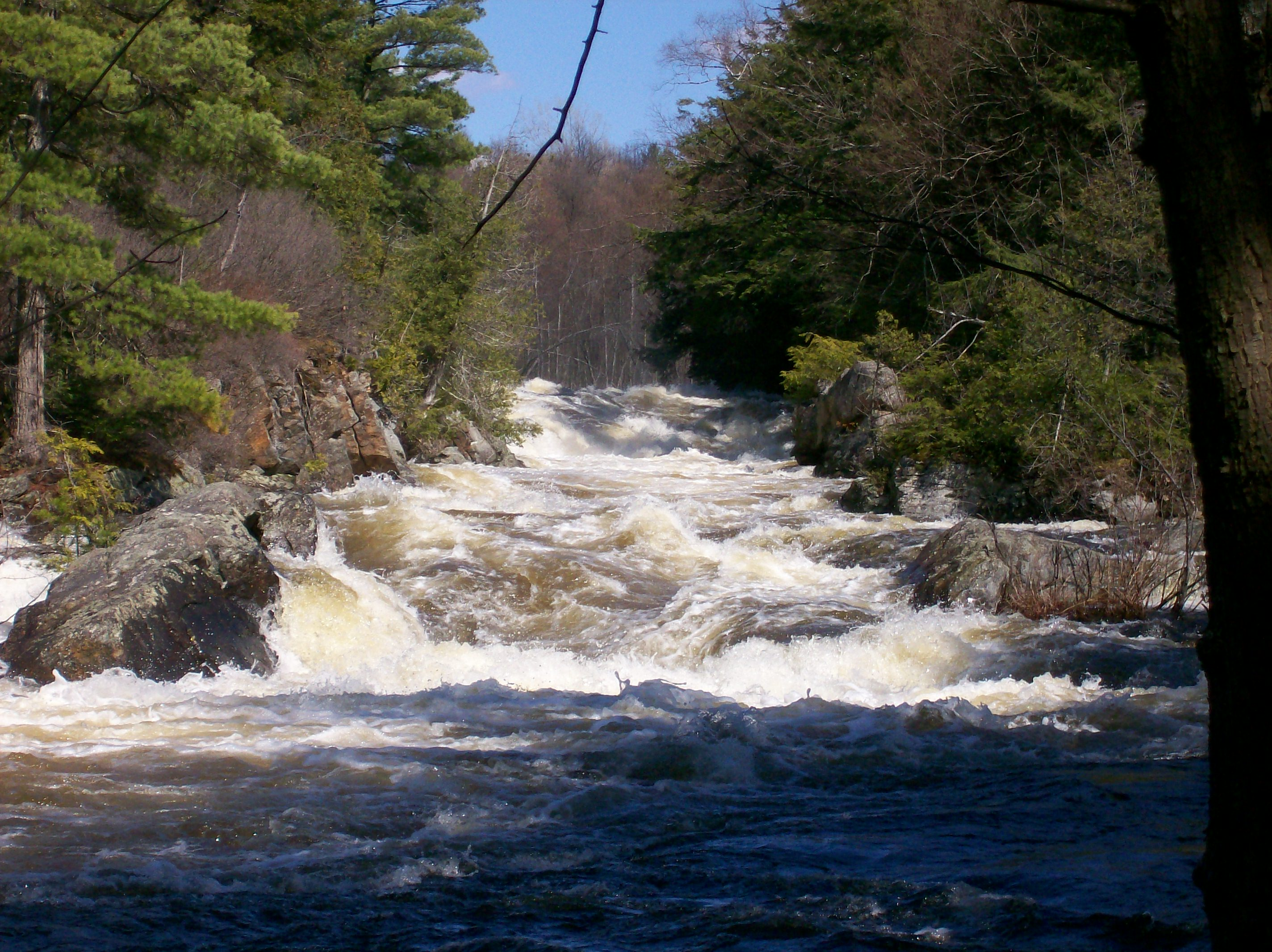
Rapids can provide enough hydraulic head

The potential power at a site is a result of the head and flow of water. By damming a river, the head is available to generate power at the face of the dam. A dam may create a reservoir hundreds of kilometres long, but in run-of-the-river the head is usually delivered by a canal, pipe or tunnel constructed upstream of the power house. The cost of upstream construction makes a steep drop desirable, such as falls or rapids.

=== Environmental impacts ===
Small, well-sited run-of-the-river projects can be developed with minimal environmental impacts. Larger projects have more environmental concerns. For fish-bearing rivers, a ladder may be required, and dissolved gases downstream may affect fish.

In British Columbia, the mountainous terrain and wealth of big rivers have made it a global testing ground for 10–50 MW run-of-river technology. As of March 2010, there were 628 applications pending for new water licences solely for power generation, representing more than 750 potential points of river diversion.

In undeveloped areas, new access roads and transmission lines can cause habitat fragmentation, allowing the introduction of invasive species.

=== Vulnerable to climate change ===
Run-of-the-river projects strongly depend on the consistent flow of water, as they lack reservoirs and depend on the natural flow of rivers. Consequently, these projects are more vulnerable to climate change compared to storage-based projects. Short-term climate anomalies such as the El Niño Southern Oscillation (ENSO) can significantly disrupt the flow and can have a profound impact on the operation of these projects. Thus, incorporating climate change considerations into the initial design and location selection of run-of-the-river projects can help mitigate the vulnerability of these projects to climate-related disruptions.

== Major examples ==
- Jirau Dam, Rondônia, Brazil 3,750 MW
- Santo Antônio Dam, Rondônia, Brazil 3,580 MW
- Chief Joseph Dam, Washington, United States 2,620 MW
- John Day Dam, Oregon/Washington, United States 2,160 MW
- Beauharnois Hydroelectric Power Station, Quebec, Canada, 1,903 MW
- The Dalles Dam, Oregon/Washington, United States 1,878 MW
- Teles Pires Dam, Brazil 1,820 MW
- Inga Dams, Democratic Republic of the Congo 1,775 MW
- Nathpa Jhakri Dam, Satluj River, Shimla, India, 1,500 MW
- Ghazi-Barotha Hydropower Project, Khyber Pakhtunkhwa, Pakistan 1,450 MW
- Gezhouba Dam, Yichang, Hubei, China 2,715 MW

== See also ==
- Environmental impact of electricity generation
- Environmental impacts of reservoirs
- Hydropower
- Small hydro
- Micro hydro
- Pico hydro
- Gravitation water vortex power plant
- Tidal power
- Marine current power
