= China XD Group =

Chinese electronical equipment manufacturers

- Company type: Power transmission and distribution electrical equipment manufacturer
- Industry: Power engineering, electrical equipment manufacturing
- Founded: July 1959; 66 years ago in China
- Headquarters: Xi'an, Shaanxi, Post Code 710075, China
- Area served: Worldwide
- Website: www.xd.com.cn

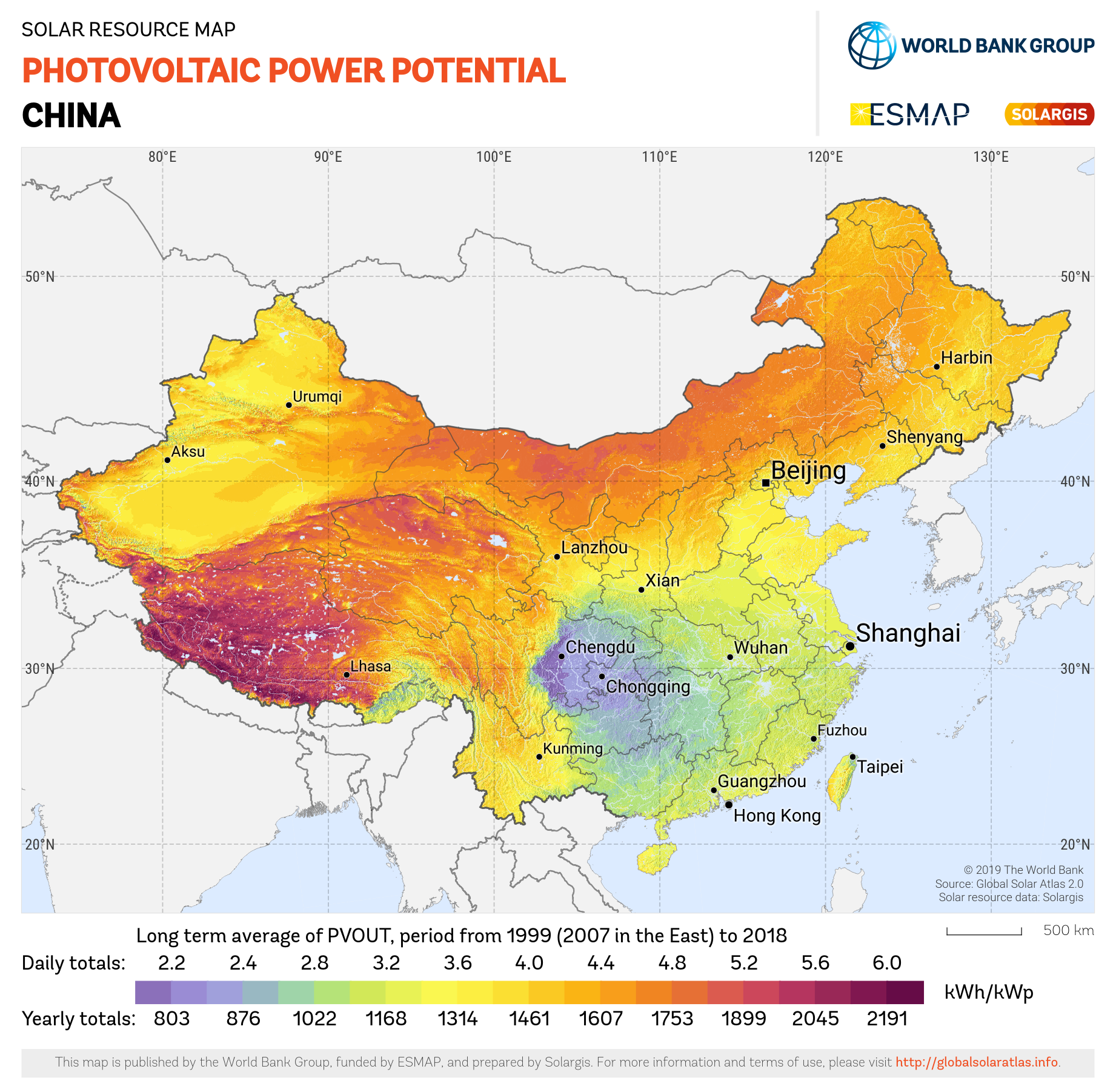
China PVOUT Photovoltaic power potential map (2021)

China XD Group is a Chinese state-owned central enterprise responsible for manufacturing high-voltage and super grid electric power transmission and distribution equipment.

China XD Group's products include power generation and power transmission equipment, distribution systems, transformers, and related electrical equipment.

== Business overview ==
China XD Group is involved in the research, development, design, production, sale, testing, distribution of control equipment for high-voltage energy transmission and distribution systems.

According to the company, China XD Group operates approximately 60 subsidiaries, including 10 medium-sized production enterprises and three research institutions. The company employs about 18,000 people, including around 3,000 engineers and technicians.

The company asserts that it exports its products and technologies to nearly 40 countries and regions, including Germany, the United States of America, Singapore, and Hong Kong.

China XD Group's research institutions conduct experiments on high-voltage, high-current, and large-capacity AC/DC electricity. The group is a member of the International Electrotechnical Commission (IEC) and the International Conference on Large High Voltage Electric Systems (CIGRE), serving as the ICE's designated administrative body in China. China XD Group claims to have developed approximately 1300 products. Additionally, the company holds 260 patents, including two related to computer software copyright.

== Products ==
China XD Group specializes in electrical equipment and systems. Key product categories include:

- Transformers: Up to 750 kV for power and converter applications.
- High-voltage reactors: Smoothing and shunt reactors.
- Switchgear: Gas-insulated (GIS) systems up to 800 kV.
- Lightning arresters and capacitor voltage transformers.

These products serve high-voltage power networks, supporting national and international infrastructure projects.

== Projects ==
XD Group supplies power transmission and distribution equipment in China and components for national engineering projects, including the first infrastructure in China for 330kV and 550kV DC, 750kV AC, ±100kV DC, ±500 kV DC, and ±800 kV DC transmission. Additionally, they have contributed to China's first DC power supply network from the northwest to the north, participated in the Three Gorges Project, and supported the west-to-east electricity transmission project. According to the Belt and Road Energy Cooperation website, components like transformers of 750kV, reactors, lightning arresters, capacitor voltage transformers and isolating switches of 800kV have successfully operated in 750kV model projects in northwest China. China's first 800 kV double cut-off pot-style breakers have been operated at Yinchuan East Transformer Substation.

XD Group has developed technology for AC 1100kV and DC ±800kV components in China, providing equipment such as 1000kV GIS, reactors, capacitor voltage transformers, lightning arresters, ground switches, and insulators for the Mega-Volt (MV) model line “Southeast Shanxi—Nanyang—Jingmen Model Project.” Additionally, the company supplied transformers, valves, capacitors, and lightning arresters for the “Yunnan—Guangzhou” ±800kV High Voltage DC Transmission Project.

=== Participation in the Belt and Road Initiative ===
Since the Belt and Road Initiative was proposed in 2013, China XD Group has exported its products and technologies to around 100 countries and regions, supplying equipment for international infrastructure projects. Major projects include:

==== Southeast Asia ====
- Indonesia: Joint venture to produce 500 kV power transformers.
- Philippines: Construction of the MVIP HVDC transmission project.
- Laos: Completion of the Hongsa power transmission and transformation turn-key project.
- Malaysia: Transmission line project undertakings.

==== South Asia ====
- Pakistan: Construction of the first ±660kV HVDC transmission line.

==== Middle East ====
- Saudi Arabia: Equipment supply for the NEOM water electrolysis hydrogen production project.

==== Central Asia ====
- Uzbekistan: Signed EPC contract for the 500kV ring transmission line project.

=== Wind Power Projects ===
In 2013, XD planned to assist Uzbekistan in constructing wind farms as its first major wind power project. A Memorandum of Understanding (MoU) was signed with Uzbekenergo, the country's governing body for energy, to conduct a feasibility study on the establishment of wind farms.
