= Greenhalgh-with-Thistleton =

Civil parish in Lancashire, England

Coordinates: 53.833°N 2.901°W

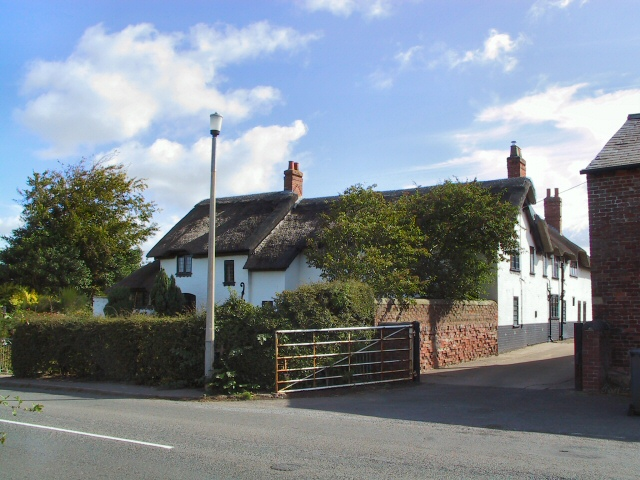
- Thatched farm house and buildings at Thistleton

- Shown within Fylde Borough Shown within the Fylde Location within Lancashire
- Population: 439 (2011)
- OS grid reference: SD406378
- Civil parish: Greenhalgh-with-Thistleton
- District: Fylde
- Shire county: Lancashire
- Region: North West
- Country: England
- Sovereign state: United Kingdom
- Post town: PRESTON
- Postcode district: PR4
- Dialling code: 01995
- Police: Lancashire
- Fire: Lancashire
- Ambulance: North West
- UK Parliament: Fylde

Greenhalgh-with-Thistleton is a civil parish on the Fylde in Lancashire, England. In 2001 it had a population of 462, falling to 439 at the 2011 Census.

The parish is in the Borough of Fylde, and contains the hamlets of Greenhalgh, Thistleton, Esprick and Corner Row. It is part of the ward of Singleton and Greenhalgh, which elects one councillor. In 2015 it was represented by Maxine Chew, an independent councillor.

The main road through the parish is the A585 Kirkham to Fleetwood road; there is also a junction with the M55 motorway (M55 J3, Wesham Circle) in the south of the parish. The linear settlement of Esprick is situated along the A585, with Corner Row (used to be known as Cornah Row until M55 was completed 1975) further south where the road crosses the M55. Greenhalgh is to the west, and Thistleton in the north east corner of the parish. Greenhalgh is adjacent to Wesham. The surrounding area is agricultural land.

Thistleton has been designated as a conservation area since 1975.

The nearest railway station is Kirkham and Wesham, with Poulton-le-Fylde a little further away.

== History ==
Domesday Book records the village as "Greneholf".

On Fleetwood Old Road is the former Ebenezer Congregational chapel, founded in 1851 and now converted into a private dwelling.

== Toponymy ==
Greenhalghe came from OE grēne "green" and healh, halh "corner, hook; haugh" (related to holh "hollow; cave"). The name is pronounced as /ˈɡriːnhælʃ/ or /ˈɡriːnhɔːlʃ/.

== See also ==
- Listed buildings in Greenhalgh-with-Thistleton
