= Abaeté River =

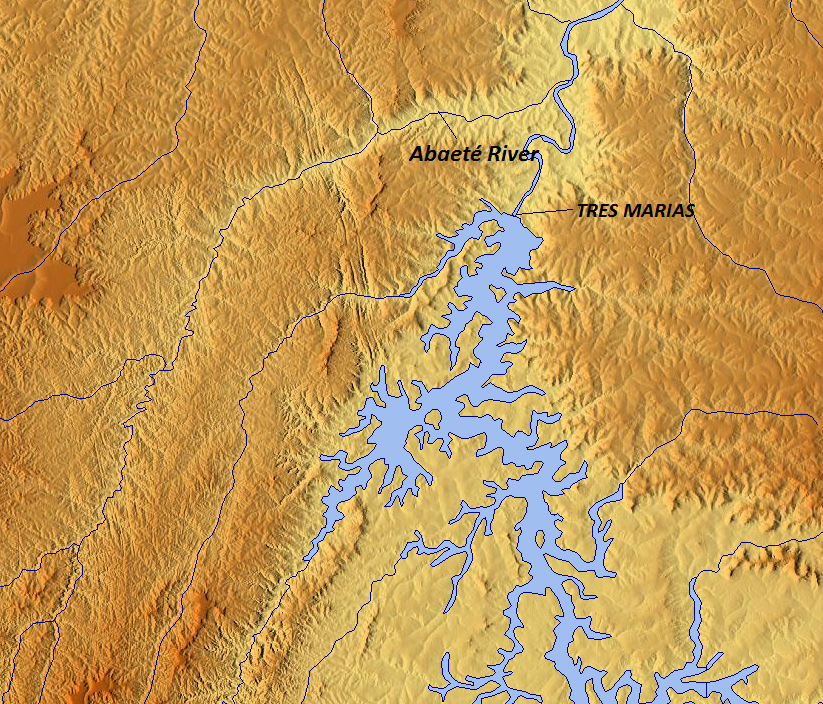
- Map showing the Abaeté River and the São Francisco River and Lake Tres Marias

Location
- Country: Brazil

Physical characteristics
- Source
  - location: Minas Gerais state
- Mouth: São Francisco River
  - coordinates: 18°2′S 45°11′W
- Length: 270 km (170 mi)

The Abaeté River is a river of Minas Gerais state in southeastern Brazil. Its origin is in the Serra da Canastra, about 20 kilometres (12 mi) north of São Gotardo and it passes through São Gonçalo do Abaeté. The river runs nearly north and empties into the São Francisco River, the confluence being located at 18°2′15″S 45°11′14″W. The Pontal area at the Abaeté River mouth is an important spawning site for fish.

== Geography ==
The Abaeté flows for 270 kilometres (170 mi) and its width varies between 200 ft (61 m) to 500 ft (150 m). It is a rock-bottomed highland river, containing clay sediments. It traverses through nine municipalities in Minas Gerais:

- São Gotardo
- Rio Paranaíba
- Matutina
- Arapuá
- Tiros
- Carmo do Paranaíba
- Patos de Minas
- Varjão de Minas
- São Gonçalo do Abaeté

== Geology ==
Noted for its diamond mines, diamonds were first discovered in the river during the period of 1780-85. Several of the largest diamonds found in Brazil originated here, though medium or low quality stones are more common. A diamond, known as the Abaeté brilliant, was discovered in the river in 1791 whilst a group of men were searching for gold.

In addition to garnets, gold, iridium, jaspers, osmium, and platinum, the gravel contains 30 other minerals. The palladium-free platinum found in the Abaeté River is strongly magnetic and rich in iron.

== Dam ==
South of the confluence of the river, along the São Francisco River, is the Três Marias Dam, (Três Marias is a popular legend linked with the river and three sisters) named after Bernard Mascarenhas who had built South America's first major hydroelectric power plant in Brazil, the Marmelos Zero Power Plant in 1889. It is one of the largest earth dams in the world for developed for deriving multipurpose benefits. The project envisaged control of the flow of the river through flood storage, improving its navigability, providing irrigation, generating hydroelectric power to supply for the development of industry and other uses. Begun in 1957, the dam was completed in January 1961 while the first units of the power station was commissioned in 1962; the balance five units of the power station were commissioned by end of 1979. Its construction is considered a world record in this type of construction employing 10,000 people working during the peak of construction activity.

The dam is 2,700 metres (8,900 ft) long with a base of 600 feet (180 m) and a height of 75 metres (246 ft). The hydroelectric power station has an installed capacity of 396 MW (six units of 64.6 MW capacity each). The reservoir or the lake formed by the dam, known as the "Sweet Sea of Minas", has 21 billion cubic meters of water, a surface area of 1,040 square kilometres (400 sq mi)(8.7 times greater than Guanabara Bay), and provides water to 8 municipalities; one of the many islands formed in the lake is an ecological station; the Estação Ecologica de Pirapitinga.
