= Voe Minas Gerais =

- Founded: 2016
- Commenced operations: 2016
- Ceased operations: 2019
- Operating bases: Belo Horizonte/Pampulha – Carlos Drummond de Andrade Airport
- Headquarters: Belo Horizonte, Brazil
- Website: www.voeminasgerais.com.br

Voe Minas Gerais was a program and informal name of a domestic airline based in Belo Horizonte/Pampulha – Carlos Drummond de Andrade Airport, Brazil, established in 2016 by the Government of the State of Minas Gerais via its Minas Gerais Development Company CODEMGE.

Flights were operated by the contractor company TwoFlex on behalf of Voe Minas Gerais. According to the National Civil Aviation Agency of Brazil (ANAC), between January and December 2018, Voe Minas Gerais operated by Two Flex had 0% of the domestic market share in terms of passengers per kilometre flown.

The program was discontinued on June 30, 2019.

== History ==
Officially known as Projeto de Integração Regional de Minas Gerais-Modal Aéreo PIRMA (transl. Minas Gerais Regional Integration Air Mode) and informally known as Voe Minas Gerais, the project was established in August 2016 by the Government of the State of Minas Gerais under the responsibility of the Secretariat of Economic Development of Minas Gerais, as a project of State integration using aircraft. The first flight took off on August 17, 2016.

Since its conception, the project was divided into phases, with destinations and schedules being constantly evaluated, with destinations added, maintained or terminated according to demand. In April 2019, the program implemented its 11th and last phase.

Flights were operated by the contract company TwoFlex using its Cessna 208 Caravan aircraft. Schedule flights, sold using Voe Minas Gerais commercial platform, were operated Monday to Friday using Belo Horizonte/Pampulha – Carlos Drummond de Andrade Airport as hub.

The program was discontinued on June 30, 2019. The State Government has plans to support the busiest routes via private operators.

== Destinations ==
In its eleven phases (the last one was implemented in April 2019), the program operated scheduled services to the following destinations:

City	Airport
Almenara	
Araçuaí	
Araxá	Romeu Zema Airport
Barbacena	
Belo Horizonte	Pampulha / Carlos Drummond de Andrade Airport
Caratinga	Ubaporanga Airport
Curvelo	
Diamantina	Juscelino Kubitschek Airport
Divinópolis	Brig. Cabral Airport
Governador Valadares	Cel. Altino Machado de Oliveira Airport
Guaxupé	
Ipatinga / Santana do Paraíso	Usiminas Airport
Jaíba	
Januária	Januária Airport
Juiz de Fora	Francisco Álvares de Assis Airport (Serrinha)
Lavras	
Manhuaçu	Elias Breder Airport
Montes Claros	Mário Ribeiro Airport
Muriaé	
Nanuque	
Paracatu	Pedro Rabelo de Souza Airport
Passos	
Patos de Minas	Pedro Pereira dos Santos Airport
Patrocínio	
Pirapora	
Piumhi	
Poços de Caldas	Emb. Walther Moreira Salles Airport
Ponte Nova	
Pouso Alegre	
Salinas	Salinas Airport
São João del Rei	Pref. Octávio de Almeida Neves Airport
Teófilo Otoni	Kemil Kumaira Airport
Ubá	
Uberlândia	Ten. Cel. Av. César Bombonato Airport
Varginha	Major-Brigadeiro Trompowsky Airport
Viçosa	

== Fleet ==
Flights were operated by the Contract Company TwoFlex using Cessna 208 Caravan aircraft.

Voe Minas Gerais fleet'
Aircraft	Total	Passengers (Y)	Notes
Cessna 208 Caravan		9	

== Airline affinity program ==
Voe Minas Gerais had no frequent flyer program but offered discounts on bulk and advanced purchase tickets.

== See also ==
- List of defunct airlines of Brazil
