= Vazante =

Municipality in the state of Minas Gerais in Brazil

Coordinates: 17°59′21″S 46°54′07″W

- Municipality
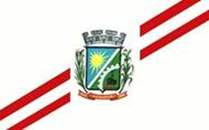
- Flag
- Interactive map of Vazante
- Country: Brazil
- State: Minas Gerais
- Region: Southeast
- Time zone: UTC−3 (BRT)

Location of Vazante in the state of Minas Gerais

Vazante is a municipality in the north of the Brazilian state of Minas Gerais. Its population in 2020 was 20,642 inhabitants in a total area of 1,903 km^{2} (735 sq mi). It is a large producer of cattle and with a significant zinc mining industry.

== Geography ==
Vazante belongs to the Paracatu statistical microregion. The elevation of the municipal seat is 680 meters (2,230 ft). It became a municipality in 1953. This municipality is located north of Patos de Minas on paved national highway BR-354. It is 27 km (17 mi) north of Lagamar and 39 km (24 mi) southeast of Guarda-Mor. The distance to the capital of the state, Belo Horizonte, is 496 km (308 mi).

Neighboring municipalities are: Lagoa Grande, Coromandel, Guarda-Mor, Lagamar and Paracatu. There are two districts, besides the municipal seat: Claro de Minas, 12 km (7.5 mi) distant, and Vazamor, 32 km (20 mi) distant.

=== Climate ===
The climate is humid sub-tropical with an average maximum of 35 °C (95 °F); a minimum of 16 °C (61 °F); and an annual average between 21 °C (70 °F) and 24 °C (75 °F). The hottest time of the year is between September and October and the coldest in June and July. The year can be divided into a rainy summer, from October to April, and a dry winter, from May to September.

=== Hydrography ===
The main river is the Rio Claro, which has its source in the Serra de Chapadinha. Another river is the Rio Santa Catarina, which is a tributary of the Paracatu River. There are several lakes, the most important being Lagoa do Vermelho.

== Economy ==
The main economic activities are cattle raising, mining and farming. The GDP was R$209,137,000 (2003). In agriculture the main products cultivated are mangoes, rice, soybeans, and corn. There are 02 bank branches in the town. In the health sector there were 12 health clinics and 02 hospital with 59 beds (2007).

There is also a large open-pit zinc mine. The Vazante Mine is a property of Votorantim Metais and has reserves of around 2 million tons of zinc. It has the largest Brazilian deposit of zinc ore, with a production of 290,000 tons of silicate concentrate. and

In the rural area there were 712 farms and a total agricultural area of 133,000 hectares (330,000 acres), of which 34,000 ha (84,000 acres) were planted, 75,000 ha (190,000 acres) were in natural pasture, and 44,000 ha (110,000 acres). were in woodland or forest. 2,000 people were dependent on farming. 149 of the farms had tractors. In 2006 there were 84,000 head of cattle.

The score on the Municipal Human Development Index was 0.757. Vazante was ranked 235 out of 853 municipalities in the state, with Poços de Caldas in first place with 0.841 and Setubinha in last place with 0.568.

== History ==
The settlement of Vazante began on a ranch called Vazante due to an alleged religious vision of the Virgin Mary in a cave. The founding of the town occurred in 1920 when the site of the vision, Lapa, was separated from the ranch. Around a chapel houses were built and soon a small general store appeared. This was the arraial (village) of Vazante, in the district of Guarda-Mor, in the municipality of Paracatu. In 1938 Vazante was raised to the category of district, and in 1952 it became a municipality, despite having only 20 or 25 solid houses, when the law required at least 300 houses.

The most important moment in the economic history of this city was the discovery of zinc in 1933. In 1969 the first load of metal was sent to the factory in Três Marias. Today the zinc is mined and refined by Cia. Mineira de Metais - 6000 T/month and Mineração Areiense 3500 T/month.

== Tourism ==
The most important tourist site is Lapa Velha (Old Grotto), located in the city itself, where a vision of the Virgin Mary is alleged to have occurred. Every year, on 1, 2 and 3 May, thousands of pilgrims flock to Vazante to pray to the Virgin. Other caves are Lapa Nova (New Grotto), and Lapa da Delza or Caçula (Youngest Grotto). The cavern of Lapa Nova is listed as the fourth largest in the country.

== See also ==
- List of municipalities in Minas Gerais
