= Presidente Olegário =

Town and municipality in the state of Minas Gerais, Brazil

- Municipality
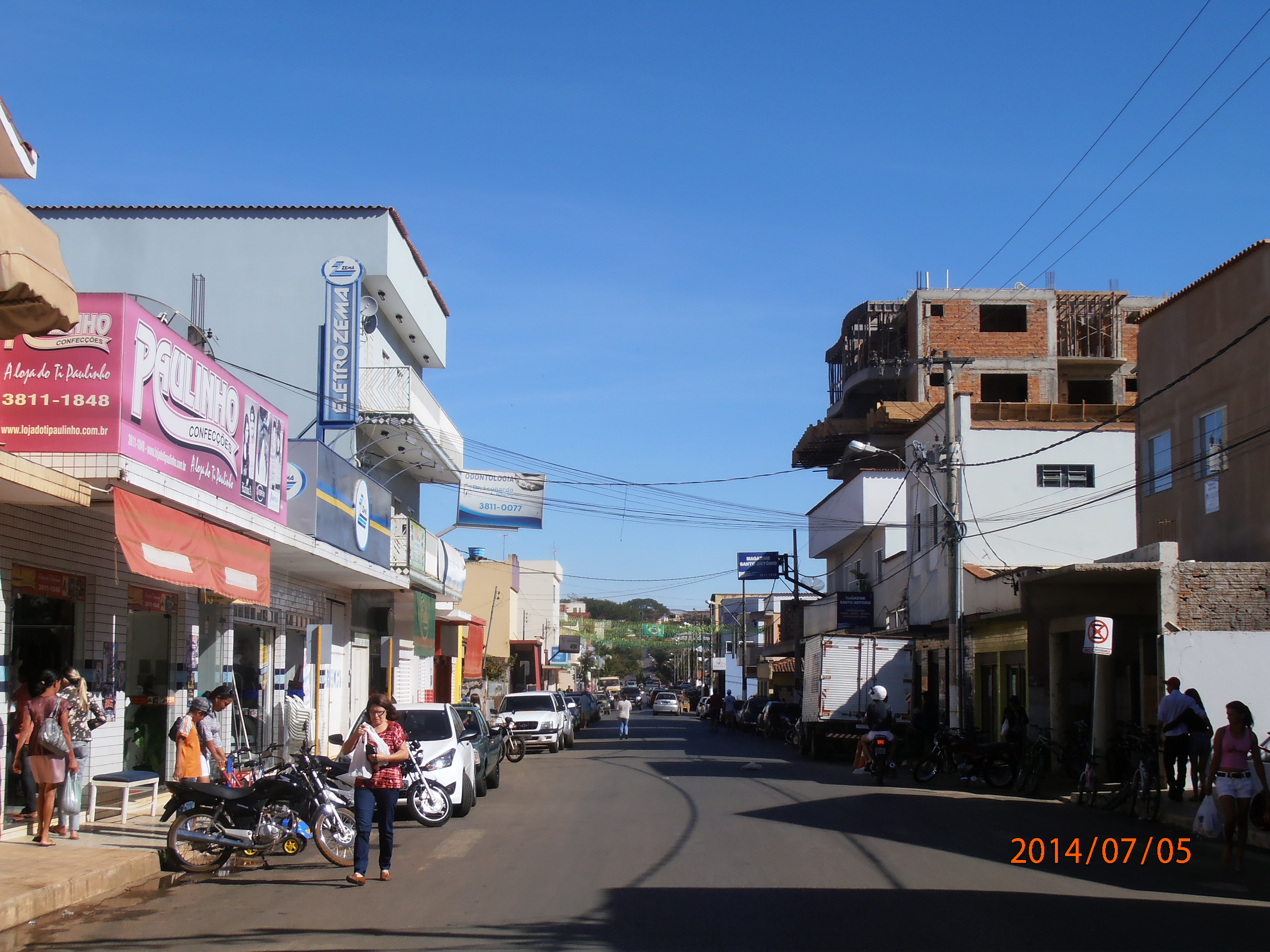
- Centrum of Presidente Olegário

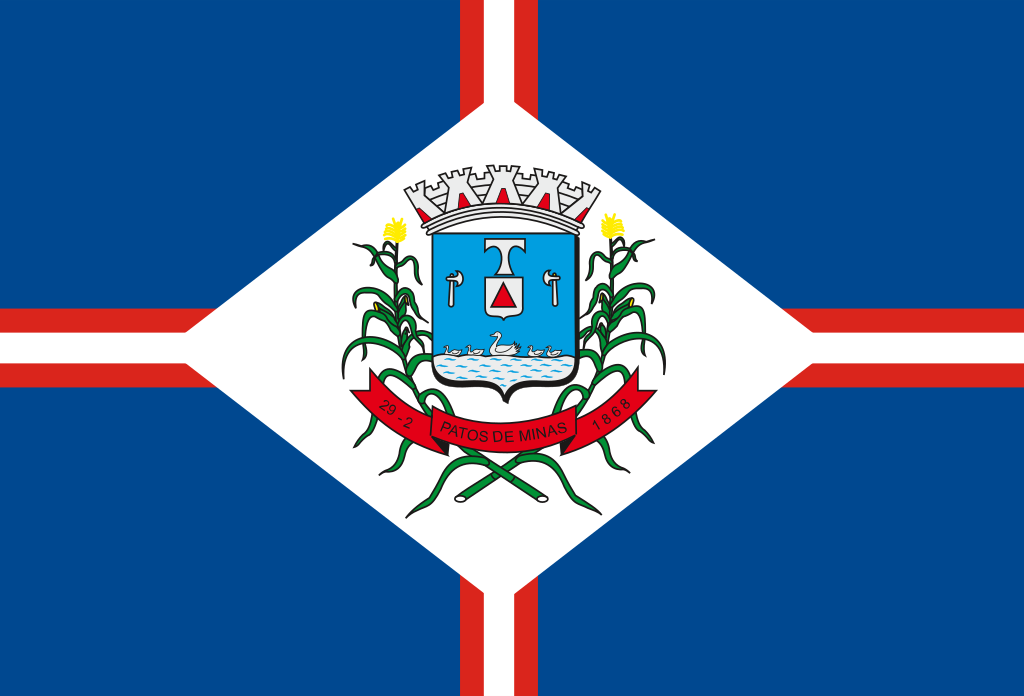
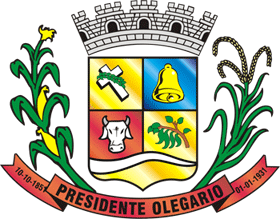
- Flag Coat of arms

- Localization of Presidente Olegário in Minas Gerais

- Localization of Presidente Olegário in Brazil
- Coordinates: 18°25′04″S 46°25′04″W
- Country: Brazil
- Region: Southeast
- State: Minas Gerais
- Incorporated: January 1, 1939

Area
  - Municipality: 3,503.848 km^{2} (1,352.843 sq mi)
  - Urban: 5.390 km^{2} (2.081 sq mi)

Population (2022)
  - Municipality: 18,765
- Demonym: olegarense
- Time zone: UTC−3 (BRT)
- Postal Code (CEP): 38750-000
- Area code: +55 34
- Website: presidenteolegario.mg.gov.br

Presidente Olegário municipality in the north of the Brazilian state of Minas Gerais. Its population in 2020 was 19,627 inhabitants in a total area of 3,531 km^{2} (1,363 sq mi).

== Geography ==
Presidente Olegário belongs to the Paracatu statistical microregion. The elevation of the municipal seat is 947 m (3,107 feet). It became a municipality in 1938. This municipality is located 28 km (17 miles) northeast of Patos de Minas. The distance to the capital, Belo Horizonte is 433 km (269 miles).

Neighboring municipalities are: Lagamar, Lagoa Grande, Patos de Minas, Varjão de Minas, João Pinheiro and São Gonçalo do Abaeté.

== Economy ==
The main economic activities are cattle raising (118,000 head in 2006) and farming. There was also production of charcoal from eucalyptus plantations. This charcoal is transported to the industrial region near Belo Horizonte to be used in the steel and iron industry. The GDP was R$169,963,000 (2005). There were two banking agencies in 2006. In the rural area there were 1,790 farms with 260,000 hectares (640,000 acres) hectares of agricultural land, 34,000 hectares (84,000 acres) of which were planted, 163,000 (400,000) were in natural pasture, and 48,000 (120,000) were in woodland or forest. Around 6,500 people were involved in the agricultural sector. There were 439 tractors, a ratio of one tractor for every 40 farms. The main crops were cotton, rice, sugarcane, beans, tomatoes, soybeans, and corn. In the health sector there were 10 health clinics and one hospital with 20 beds. In Patos de Minas, 28 km (17 miles) away on paved roads there are complete health facilities.

The score on the Municipal Human Development Index was 0.721. This ranked Presidente Olegário 457 out of 853 municipalities in the state, with Poços de Caldas in first place with 0.841 and Setubinha in last place with 0.568.

== See also ==
- List of municipalities in Minas Gerais
