= Lagamar =

Town and municipality in the state of Minas Gerais, Brazil

Coordinates: 18°10′46″S 46°48′27″W

- Municipality
- Flag Coat of arms
- Interactive map of Lagamar
- Country: Brazil
- State: Minas Gerais
- Region: Southeast
- Time zone: UTC−3 (BRT)

Location of Lagamar in the state of Minas Gerais

Lagamar is a municipality in the north of the Brazilian state of Minas Gerais. Its population in 2020 was 7,600 inhabitants in a total area of 1,425 km^{2} (550 sq mi). It is a large producer of cattle and grains and there is extraction of phosphates.

Lagamar belongs to the Paracatu statistical microregion. The elevation of the municipal seat is 836 meters. It became a municipality in 1962. This municipality is located north of Patos de Minas on paved MG-188. The distance is 80 km (50 mi). The distance to the capital, Belo Horizonte, is 492 km (306 mi). Other distances:

- Vazante: in the north – 28 km (17 mi).
- Patos de Minas: in the south – 83 km (52 mi).
- Presidente Olegário: in the east – 52 km (32 mi).
- Coromandel: in the west – 75 km (47 mi).

Neighboring municipalities are: Lagoa Grande, Coromandel, Vazante, Presidente Olegário and Patos de Minas.

The climate is humid sub-tropical with an average maximum of 35°C; a minimum of 16°C; and an annual average of 22°C.

The main economic activities are cattle raising and farming. The GDP was R$46,194,000 (2003). In agriculture the main products cultivated are rice and corn, followed by soybeans, beans and passion fruit. One of the main sources of income is the mining industry and extraction of phosphates. The Banco do Brasil has a branch in the town. In the health sector there were 06 health clinics and 01 hospital with 16 beds (2007).

In the rural area there were 922 farms and a total agricultural area of 106,000 hectares, of which 6,500 ha. were planted, 83,000 were in natural pasture, and 13,000 ha. were in woodland or forest. 2,200 people were dependent on farming. 122 of the farms had tractors. The main crops in planted area were rice, 490 ha.; corn, 1,900 ha.; and soybeans, 1,300 ha. In 2006 there were 66,000 head of cattle.

The score on the Municipal Human Development Index was 0.731. This ranked Lagamar 416 out of 853 municipalities in the state, with Poços de Caldas in first place with 0.841 and Setubinha in last place with 0.568.

== See also ==
- List of municipalities in Minas Gerais
