= Paineiras =

Human settlement in Brazil

Coordinates: 18°54′21″S 45°32′17″W

- Municipality
- Interactive map of Paineiras
- Country: Brazil
- State: Minas Gerais
- Region: Southeast

Population (2022 Census)
  - Total: 4,224
  - Estimate (2025): 4,253
- Time zone: UTC−3 (BRT)

Location of Paineiras within Minas Gerais

Paineiras is a Brazilian municipality in the midwest of the state of Minas Gerais. As of 2025, the population was 4,253 in a total area of 638 km^{2}. It became a municipality in 1962.

== Geography ==
Paineiras belongs to the statistical micro-region of Três Marias. It is located at an elevation of 637 meters between the Indaiá River and the southern reaches of the Três Marias reservoir, which dams up the São Francisco River. Neighboring municipalities are:

- North: Biquinhas
- West: Tiros
- South: Abaeté, Cedro do Abaeté
- East: Felixlândia

=== Distances ===
- Morada Nova de Minas: 42 kilometres away
- Biquinhas: 17 kilometres away
- Belo Horizonte: 242 kilometres away
- Brasília: 513 kilometres away

Connections to the north and south are made on road MG-415.

== Economic activities ==
The most important economic activities are cattle raising, commerce, and agriculture. The GDP in 2005 was 27 million Brazilian Real, of which, 14 million came from services and 10 million came from agriculture. Paineiras is in the middle tier of municipalities in the state with regard to economic and social development. As of 2007, there were no banking agencies in the town but there was a small retail infrastructure serving the surrounding area of cattle and agricultural lands. In 2007, there were 642 automobiles in the entire municipality, about one automobile for every 7 inhabitants.

In the rural area, there were 496 establishments occupying 87,000 hectares (planted area, 2,200 hectares; natural pasture, 63,000 hectares; and woodland, 14,000 hectares) in 2006. About 1,500 people were employed in agriculture. 48 of the municipality's farms had tractors, a ratio of one to ten farms. There were 35,000 heads of cattle in 2006 and the main crops were rice and corn. A major agricultural activity is extraction of charcoal, which is shipped by truck to be used in the industries of the Belo Horizonte region.

== Health and education ==
In the health sector there were 4 health clinics and one hospital with 14 beds. In the educational sector there were 7 primary schools and 2 middle schools.

- Municipal Human Development Index: 0.758 (2000)
- State ranking: 232 out of 853 municipalities as of 2000
- National ranking: 1,659 out of 5,138 municipalities as of 2000
- Literacy rate: 86%
- Life expectancy: 74 (average of males and females)

== See also ==
- List of municipalities in Minas Gerais
