= São Gotardo =

Town and municipality in the state of Minas Gerais, Brazil

Coordinates: 19°18′39″S 46°02′56″W

- Municipality
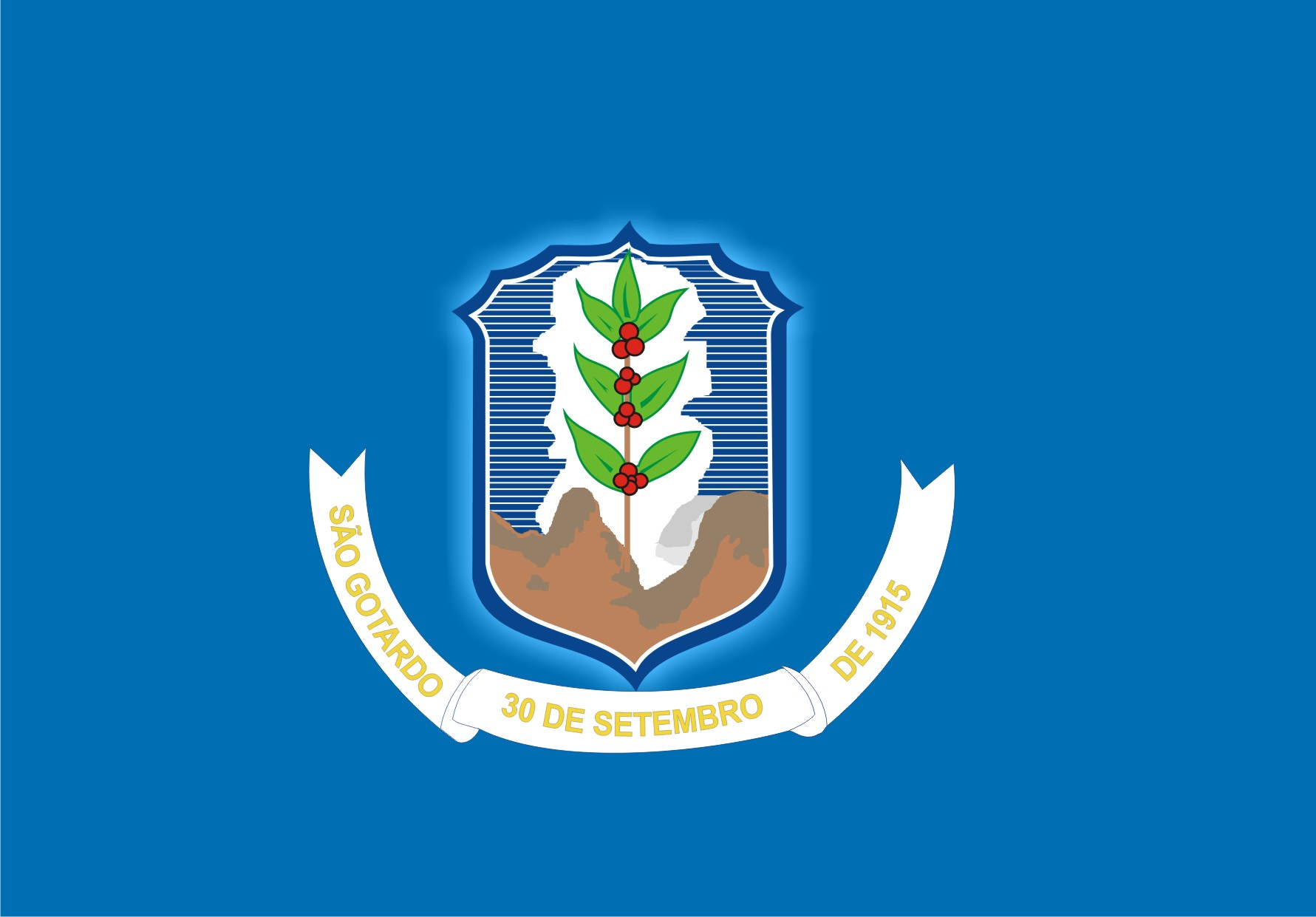
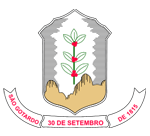
- Flag Coat of arms
- Interactive map of São Gotardo
- Country: Brazil
- State: Minas Gerais
- Region: Southeast
- Time zone: UTC−3 (BRT)

Location of São Gotardo in Minas Gerais

São Gotardo is a Brazilian municipality located in the northwest of the state of Minas Gerais. Its population as of 2020 was 35,782 people and its land area is 854 km^{2}. The city belongs to the mesoregion of Triângulo Mineiro e Alto Paranaiba and to the microregion of Patos de Minas. It became a municipality in 1915.

== Geography ==
The urban center is located at an elevation of 1,100 meters southeast of Patos de Minas in the upper Abaeté River valley. The region is made up of a plateau called Mata da Corda. The climate is mild and frost can occur in the dry season (from May to September). Neighboring municipalities are: Matutina and Tiros to the North, Rio Paranaíba to the east, Campos Altos and Santa Rosa da Serra to the south, and Quartel Geral to the west.

=== Distances ===
- Patos de Minas: 101 km
- Araxá: 163 km
- Estalagem: 55 km (BR-262)
- Rio Paranaíba: 20 km
- Matutina: 22 km
- Tiros: 43 km
- Arapua:50 km
- Belo Horizonte: 295 km

== Economic activities ==
The most important economic activities are cattle raising, commerce, and agriculture. The GDP in 2005 was R$277 million, with 166 million generated by services, 18 million generated by industry, and 66 million generated by agriculture. São Gotardo is in the top tier of municipalities in the state with regard to economic and social development. As of 2007, there were 05 banking agencies in the town. There was a well-developed retail infrastructure serving the surrounding area of cattle and agricultural lands. There were 5,961 automobiles in all of the municipality (2007), about one for every 05 inhabitants.

São Gotardo is a large producer of agricultural products, especially coffee and corn. The high elevation combined with tropical latitude allows it to produce coffee and wheat. In the rural area there were 825 establishments (2006) occupying 61,000 hectares (planted area of 14,000 ha and natural pasture of 35,000 ha.). About 3,000 persons were dependent on agriculture. 113 of the farms had tractors, a ratio of one in 7 farms. There were 43,000 head of cattle in 2006. The main crops were:

- avocado: 120 hectares
- coffee: 2,820 hectares
- garlic: 65 hectares
- potatoes: 110 hectares
- onions: 77 hectares
- beans: 420 hectares
- corn: 3,600 hectares
- soybeans: 1,500 hectares
- wheat: 130 hectares

== Health and education ==
In the health sector there were 13 health clinics and 02 hospitals with 44 beds In the educational sector there were 12 pre-primary schools, 17 primary schools, and 05 middle schools.

- Municipal Human Development Index: 0.807 (2000)
- State ranking: 30 out of 853 municipalities as of 2000
- National ranking: 439 out of 5,138 municipalities as of 2000
- Literacy rate: 88%
- Life expectancy: 73 (average of males and females)

The highest ranking municipality in Minas Gerais in 2000 was Poços de Caldas with 0.841, while the lowest was Setubinha with 0.568. Nationally the highest was São Caetano do Sul in São Paulo with 0.919, while the lowest was Setubinha. In more recent statistics (considering 5,507 municipalities) Manari in the state of Pernambuco has the lowest rating in the country, 467, putting it in last place.

== Name ==
The name is inspired by Joaquim Gotardo de Lima who arrived in the region in 1836 with his family and settled on a cattle ranch which later developed into a small settlement around a chapel. In 1852 the first settlement, known as Confusão, after a local ranch, was raised to a district with the name of São Sebastião do Pouso Alegre. Later the name was changed to pay homage to the founder, who unexpectedly gained sainthood in the new name.

== See also ==
- List of municipalities in Minas Gerais
