= São Gonçalo do Abaeté =

Municipality of Brazil

Coordinates: 18°20′16″S 45°49′58″W

- Municipality
- Interactive map of São Gonçalo do Abaeté
- Country: Brazil
- State: Minas Gerais
- Region: Southeast
- Time zone: UTC−3 (BRT)

Location of São Gonçalo do Abaeté in the state of Minas Gerais

São Gonçalo do Abaeté is a municipality in the north of the Brazilian state of Minas Gerais. Its population in 2020 was 8,459 inhabitants in a total area of 2,687 km^{2}. It is a large producer of cattle and grains.

São Gonçalo do Abaeté belongs to the Paracatu statistical microregion. The elevation of the municipal seat is 789 meters. It became a municipality in 1943. This municipality is located 11 km. southeast of the federal highway BR-365. The municipal area is crossed by the Abaeté River, which is a tributary of the São Francisco River. The distance to Belo Horizonte is 380 km.

Municipal boundaries are with: Buritizeiro, João Pinheiro, Varjão de Minas, Tiros, Morada Nova de Minas, Três Marias and Presidente Olegário.

The climate is humid sub-tropical with an annual average of 22 °C. The year can be divided into a rainy season and a dry season with little temperature variation between the two.

The main economic activities are cattle raising and farming. There were 68,000 head of cattle in 2006. The GDP was R$61,277,000 (2003). In agriculture the main products cultivated are bananas, rubber, coffee, rice, corn, soybeans, beans and wheat. There is also production of charcoal from eucalyptus plantations. The charcoal is used in the metal foundries of the Belo Horizonte region. There is one bank branch in the town. In the health sector there were 05 health clinics (2007).

In the rural area there were 481 farms and a total agricultural area of 164,000 hectares, of which 5,200 ha. were planted, 116,000 were in natural pasture, and 37,000 ha. were in woodland or forest. 1,100 people were dependent on farming. 95 of the farms had tractors.

The score on the Municipal Human Development Index was 0.739. This ranked São Gonçalo do Abaeté 356 out of 853 municipalities in the state, with Poços de Caldas in first place with 0.841 and Setubinha in last place with 0.568.

== See also ==
- List of municipalities in Minas Gerais
