= Lagoa Formosa =

Coordinates: 18°46′44″S 46°24′28″W

- Municipality
- The Municipality of Lagoa Formosa
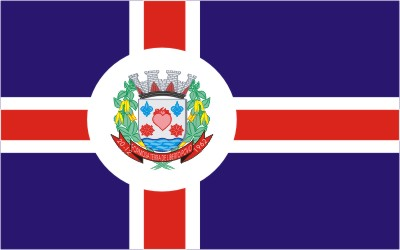
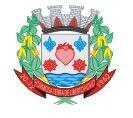
- Flag Coat of arms
- Nickname: Cidade das Rosas
- Location within Brazil
- Country: Brazil
- Region: Southeast
- State: Minas Gerais
- Founded: 1962

Government
  - Mayor: José Wilson Amorim - Zé Amorim (Podemos)

Population (2020)
  - Total: 18,111
- Time zone: UTC−3 (BRT)
- Postal Code: 38720-000
- Area code: +55 34
- Website: Lagoa Formosa, Minas Gerais

Location of Lagoa Formosa in Minas Gerais

Lagoa Formosa is a Brazilian municipality located in the northwest of the state of Minas Gerais. Its population as of 2020 was 18,111 people living in a total area of 844 km^{2} (326 sq mi). The city belongs to the mesoregion of Triângulo Mineiro e Alto Paranaiba and to the microregion of Patos de Minas. It became a municipality in 1962.

== Geography ==
The urban center is located at an elevation of 902 meters 19 km southeast of Patos de Minas on federal highway BR-354. Neighboring municipalities are: Patos de Minas (N), Carmo do Paranaíba (E), Carmo do Paranaíba (S), and Patos de Minas (W).

Sister city

- La Loche, Canada

=== Distances ===
- Patrocínio: 81 km
- Patos de Minas: 19 km
- Uberlândia: 236 km
- Belo Horizonte: 380 km
- Rio de Janeiro: 800 km
- São Paulo: 790 km
- Brasília: 436 km

Connections to the north and south are made by federal highway BR-354, which lies 4 km from the city center.

== Economic activities ==
The most important economic activities are cattle raising, commerce, and agriculture, especially the growing of coffee. The GDP in 2005 was R$ R$103 million, of which 50 million came from services, 06 million came from industry, and 42 million came from agriculture. Lagoa Formosa is in the top tier of municipalities in the state with regard to economic and social development. As of 2007 there was 01 banking agency in the town. There was a modest retail infrastructure serving the surrounding area of cattle and agricultural lands. There were 2,647 automobiles in all of the municipality (2007), about one for every 06 inhabitants.

In the rural area there were 1,666 establishments occupying 62,000 hectares (planted area, 9,500 ha, and natural pasture, 45,500 ha.) (2006). About 4,400 persons were employed in agriculture. 114 of the farms had tractors, a ratio of one in 12 farms. There were 64,000 head of cattle in 2006. The main crops were coffee, soybeans, beans and corn.

== Health and education ==
In the health sector there were 11 health clinics and one hospital with 26 beds. In the educational sector there were 05 pre-primary schools, 09 primary schools, and 02 middle schools.

- Municipal Human Development Index: 0.749 (2000)
- State ranking: 287 out of 853 municipalities as of 2000
- National ranking: 1,897 out of 5,138 municipalities as of 2000
- Literacy rate: 87%
- Life expectancy: 73 (average of males and females)
- Infant mortality rate (2000): 19.5 for every 1,000 live births
- Urban houses with piped water: 97.9%;
- Urban houses connected to sewage system: 94.9%;
- Urban houses with rubbish collection: 93.8%.

The highest ranking municipality in Minas Gerais in 2000 was Poços de Caldas with 0.841, while the lowest was Setubinha with 0.568. Nationally the highest was São Caetano do Sul in São Paulo with 0.919, while the lowest was Setubinha. In more recent statistics (considering 5,507 municipalities) Manari in the state of Pernambuco has the lowest rating in the country—0,467—putting it in last place.

== See also ==
- List of municipalities in Minas Gerais
