= Lagoa Grande, Minas Gerais =

Municipality in the northeast of the Brazilian state of Minas Gerais

Coordinates: 17°50′06″S 46°30′50″W

- Municipality
- Interactive map of Lagoa Grande, Minas Gerais
- Country: Brazil
- State: Minas Gerais
- Region: Southeast
- Time zone: UTC−3 (BRT)

Location of Lagoa Grande in the state of Minas Gerais

Lagoa Grande is a municipality in the northeast of the Brazilian state of Minas Gerais. Its population in 2020 was 9,608 inhabitants in a total area of 1,220 km².

Lagoa Grande belongs to the Paracatu statistical microregion. The elevation of the municipal seat is 572 meters. It became a municipality in 1993. This municipality is located 28 km. south of highway BR-040 and 24 km. north of Ponte Fina. The distance to the capital, Belo Horizonte is 507 km.

Neighboring municipalities are: Paracatu, João Pinheiro, Vazante, Lagamar and Presidente Olegário.

The main economic activities are cattle raising (64,000 head in 2006) and farming. There was also production of charcoal from eucalyptus plantations. This charcoal is transported to the industrial region near Belo Horizonte to be used in the steel and iron industry. The GDP was R$64,951,000 (2005). There were no banking agencies in 2006. In the rural area there were 568 farms with 108,000 hectares of agricultural land, 14,500 hectares of which were planted, 70,000 were in natural pasture, and 21,000 were in woodland or forest. Around 2,500 people were involved in the agricultural sector. There were 201 tractors, a ratio of one tractor for every 28 farms. The main crops were cotton, beans, tomatoes, soybeans, and corn. In the health sector there were 2 health clinics.

The score on the Municipal Human Development Index was 0.721. This ranked Lagoa Grande 459 out of 853 municipalities in the state, with Poços de Caldas in first place with 0.841 and Setubinha in last place with 0.568.

== See also ==
- List of municipalities in Minas Gerais
