= Tiros =

Town and municipality in the state of Minas Gerais, Brazil

Coordinates: 19°00′16″S 45°57′52″W

- Municipality
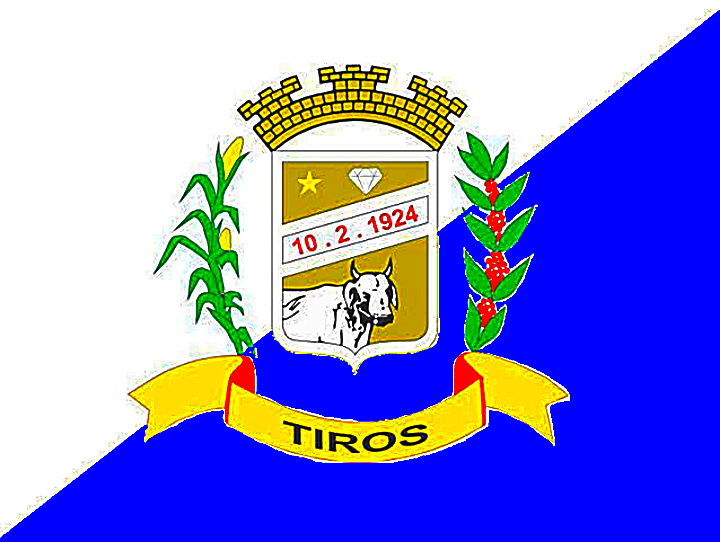
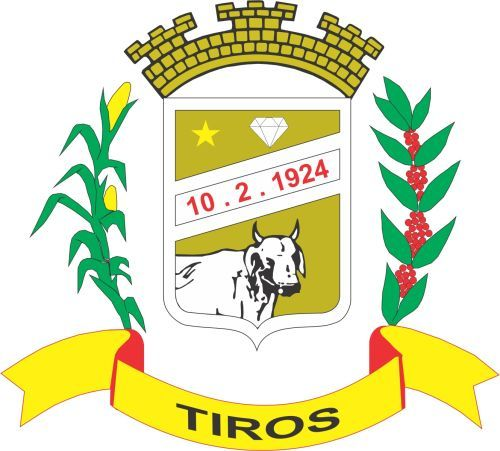
- Flag Coat of arms
- Interactive map of Tiros
- Country: Brazil
- State: Minas Gerais
- Region: Southeast
- Time zone: UTC−3 (BRT)

Location of Tiros in Minas Gerais

Tiros is a Brazilian municipality located in the northwest of the state of Minas Gerais. Its population as of 2020 was 6,424 people living in a total area of 2,093 km^{2} (808 sq mi). The city belongs to the mesoregion of Triângulo Mineiro e Alto Paranaiba and to the microregion of Patos de Minas. It became a municipality in 1924.

== Geography ==
The urban center is located at an elevation of 1,034 meters southeast of Patos de Minas in the upper Borrachudo River valley. Neighboring municipalities are: São Gonçalo do Abaeté (N), Morada Nova de Minas, Biquinhas, Paineiras, Cedro do Abaeté (E), Matutina (S), and Arapuá, Carmo do Paranaíba, Patos de Minas, Varjão de Minas(W).

=== Distances ===
- Patos de Minas: 110 km
- São Gotardo: 50 km (BR-262)
- Belo Horizonte: 365 km

== History ==
The region was first settled during the Portuguese colonial period in the eighteenth century due to the discovery of diamonds. The first settlement was called Vila de Santo Antônio de Tiros. In 1867 it became a parish of the municipality of São Francisco das Chagas do Campo Grande; in 1870 it jointed the municipality of Dores da Marmelada; in 1911, it became a district; in 1923 it became the municipality of Tiros.

According to some historians, the name is derived from a firefight between diamond miners and smugglers in 1801.

== Economic activities ==
The most important economic activities are cattle raising, commerce, and agriculture. The GDP in 2005 was R$ R$65 million, with 24 million generated by services, 05 million generated by industry, and 33 million generated by agriculture. Tiros is in the middle tier of municipalities in the state with regard to economic and social development. As of 2007 there was one banking agency in the town. There was a modest retail infrastructure serving the surrounding area of cattle and agricultural lands. There were 1,280 automobiles in all of the municipality (2007), about one for every 06 inhabitants.

Tiros has a large municipal area and therefore a lot of land for agriculture. It suffers from isolation from major population centers. In the rural area there were 1,016 establishments (2006) occupying 150,000 hectares (planted area—7,500 ha, and natural pasture—130,000 ha.). About 3,600 persons were dependent on agriculture. 66 of the farms had tractors, a ratio of one tractor for 15 farms. There were 68,000 head of cattle in 2006. The main crops were:

- coffee: 900 hectares planted in 2006
- rice: 160 hectares
- beans: 190 hectares
- corn: 1,720 hectares
- soybeans: 700 hectares

== Health and education ==
In the health sector there were six health clinics and one hospital with 16 beds. In the educational sector there were three pre-primary schools, 13 primary schools, and one middle school.

- Municipal Human Development Index: 0.755 (2000)
- State ranking: 246 out of 853 municipalities as of 2000
- National ranking: 1,722 out of 5,138 municipalities as of 2000
- Literacy rate: 86%
- Life expectancy: 73 (average of males and females)

The highest ranking municipality in Minas Gerais in 2000 was Poços de Caldas with 0.841, while the lowest was Setubinha with 0.568. Nationally the highest was São Caetano do Sul in São Paulo with 0.919, while the lowest was Setubinha. In more recent statistics (considering 5,507 municipalities) Manari in the state of Pernambuco has the lowest rating in the country—0,467—putting it in last place.

== See also ==
- List of municipalities in Minas Gerais
