= Guarda-Mor =

Town and municipality in the state of Minas Gerais, Brazil

Coordinates: 17°46′15″S 47°05′52″W

- Municipality
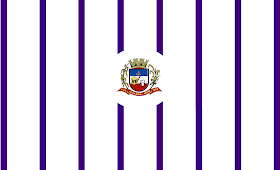
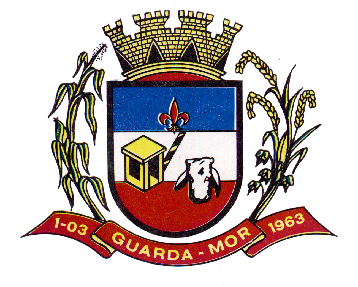
- Flag Coat of arms
- Interactive map of Guarda-Mor
- Country: Brazil
- State: Minas Gerais
- Region: Southeast
- Time zone: UTC−3 (BRT)

Location of Guarda-Mor in the state of Minas Gerais

Guarda-Mor is a municipality in the north of the Brazilian state of Minas Gerais. Its population in 2020 was 6,569 inhabitants in a total area of 2,066 km^{2}. It is a large producer of cattle and grains, especially soybeans.

Guarda-Mor belongs to the Paracatu statistical microregion. The elevation of the municipal seat is 616 meters. It became a municipality in 1962. This municipality is located to the southwest of Paracatu on paved MG-188. The distance is 70 km. The distance to the capital, Belo Horizonte is 551 km.

The climate is humid and sub-tropical. The average annual temperature is 22.6 C; the average annual maximum is 29.1 C; and the average annual minimum is 17,3 C. The average annual rainfall is 1438.7 mm, with rains falling between October and April. There are several rivers and streams: Rio Verde, Rio Claro, Rio Arrenegado, Rio Januário, Ribeirão Correio, Ribeirão Samambaia, Ribeirão São José, and Ribeirão Pilões.

Neighboring municipalities are: Paracatu, Cormomandel, Vazante, and Catalão in the state of Goiás. The main economic activities are cattle raising (73,200 head in 2006) and farming. The GDP was R$109,762,000 (2005). There was 01 banking agency in 2006. In the rural area, there were 758 farms with around 2,900 people involved in the agricultural sector. There were 547 tractors, a ratio of one tractor for every 1.5 farms. The main crops were coffee, garlic, peas, beans (1,900 ha.), soybeans (38,000 ha.), and corn (4,950 ha.). In the health sector, there were 4 health clinics and 01 hospital with 15 beds.

The score on the Municipal Human Development Index was 0.744. This ranked Guarda-Mor 335 out of 853 municipalities in the state, with Poços de Caldas in first place with 0.841 and Setubinha in last place with 0.568.

== See also ==
- List of municipalities in Minas Gerais
