= Carmo do Paranaíba =

Town and municipality in Minas Gerais, Brazil

Coordinates: 19°00′03″S 48°18′57″W

- Municipality
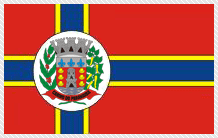
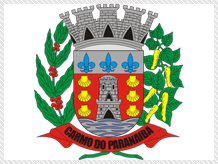
- Flag Coat of arms
- Interactive map of Carmo do Paranaíba
- Country: Brazil
- State: Minas Gerais
- Region: Southeast
- Time zone: UTC−3 (BRT)

Location of Carmo do Paranaíba in Minas Gerais

Carmo do Paranaíba is a Brazilian municipality located in the northwest of the state of Minas Gerais. Its population as of 2020 was 30,334 people living in a total area of 1,307 km^{2} (505 sq mi). The city belongs to the mesoregion of Triângulo Mineiro e Alto Paranaiba and to the microregion of Patos de Minas. It became a municipality in 1887.

== Geography ==
Carmo do Paranaíba is located at an elevation of 1,061 meters southeast of Patos de Minas. It is between the Paranaíba River and the Abaeté River. Neighboring municipalities are: Lagoa Formosa and Patos de Minas (N), Tiros and Arapuá (E), Ibiá and Rio Paranaíba (S), and Serra do Salitre (W).

=== Distances ===
- Rio Paranaíba: 28 km
- Patos de Minas: 54 km
- Belo Horizonte: 362 km

Connections to the north and south are made by federal highway BR-354, which lies 4 km (2 mi) from the city center.

== Economic activities ==
The most important economic activities are cattle raising, commerce, and agriculture, especially the growing of coffee. The GDP in 2005 was R$ R$255 million, of which 138 million came from services, 19 million came from industry, and 79 million came from agriculture. Carmo do Paranaíba is in the top tier of municipalities in the state with regard to economic and social development. As of 2007 there were 04 banking agencies in the town. There was a strong retail infrastructure serving the surrounding area of cattle and agricultural lands. There were 5,626 automobiles in all of the municipality (2007), about one for every 05 inhabitants.

In the rural area there were 1,336 establishments occupying 87,000 hectares (planted area, 14,000 ha and natural pasture 62,000 ha.) (2006). About 7,500 persons were employed in agriculture. 184 of the farms had tractors, a ratio of one in 07 farms. There were 81,000 head of cattle in 2006. The main crops were coffee (9,500 hectares), passion fruit, tomatoes, and corn.

== Health and education ==
In the health sector there were 16 health clinics and 01 hospital with 33 beds. In the educational sector there were 15 pre-primary schools, 20 primary schools, and 04 middle schools.

- Municipal Human Development Index: 0.792 (2000)
- State ranking: 67 out of 853 municipalities as of 2000
- National ranking: 746 out of 5,138 municipalities as of 2000
- Literacy rate: 88%
- Life expectancy: 75 (average of males and females)

The highest ranking municipality in Minas Gerais in 2000 was Poços de Caldas with 0.841, while the lowest was Setubinha with 0.568. Nationally the highest was São Caetano do Sul in São Paulo with 0.919, while the lowest was Setubinha. In more recent statistics (considering 5,507 municipalities) Manari in the state of Pernambuco has the lowest rating in the country—0,467—putting it in last place.

== See also ==
- List of municipalities in Minas Gerais
