= Ubaporanga =

- Municipality
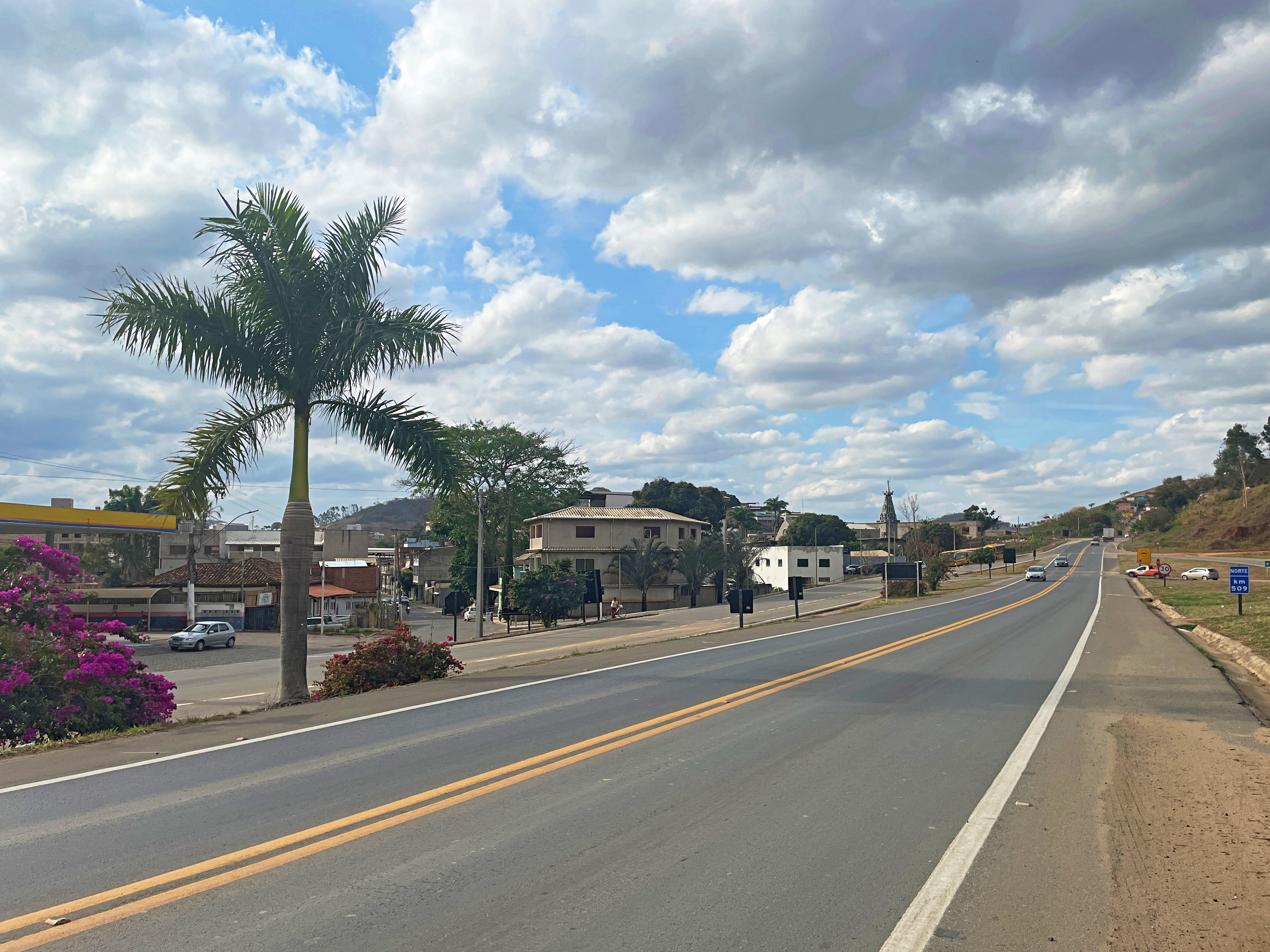
- BR-116 in urban area of Ubaporanga

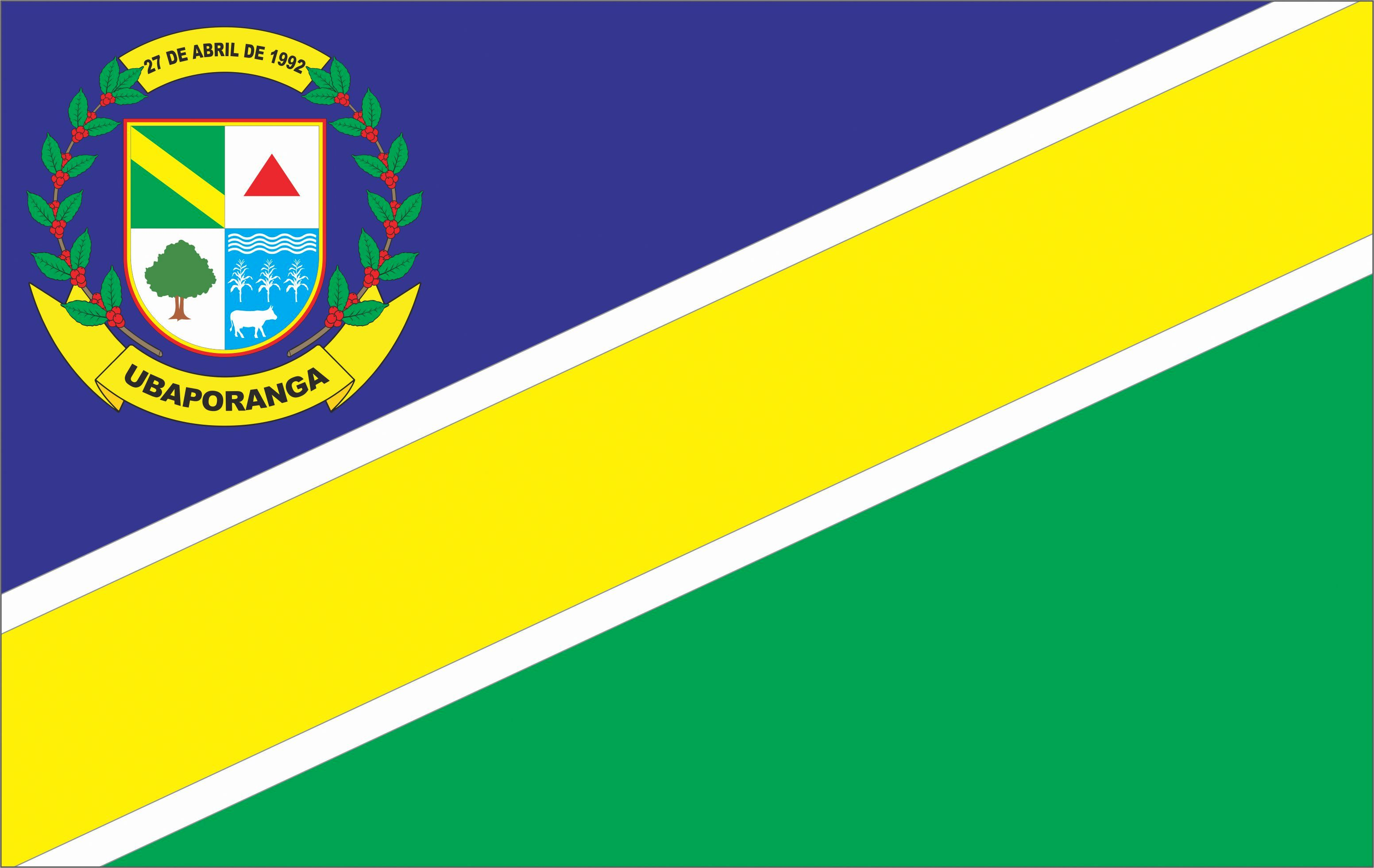
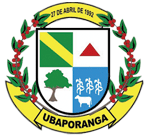
- Flag Coat of arms

- Location in Brazil
- Coordinates: 19°38′6″S 42°6′21″W
- Country: Brazil
- Region: Southeast
- State: Minas Gerais
- Mesoregion: Vale do Rio Doce
- Microregion: Caratinga
- Established: April 27, 1993

Government
  - Mayor: Gilmar de Assis Rodrigues (PPS)

Area
  - Total: 72.991 sq mi (189.045 km^{2})
- Elevation: 1,657 ft (505 m)

Population (2020)
  - Total: 12,493
  - Density: 165.0/sq mi (63.69/km^{2})
- Time zone: UTC−3 (BRT)
- Postal code: 35338 000

Ubaporanga is a municipality in the state of Minas Gerais in the Southeast region of Brazil.

== Transportation ==
The city is served by Ubaporanga Airport.

== See also ==
- List of municipalities in Minas Gerais
