= Matutina =

Town and municipality in the state of Minas Gerais, Brazil

Coordinates: 19°13′21″S 45°58′07″W

- Municipality
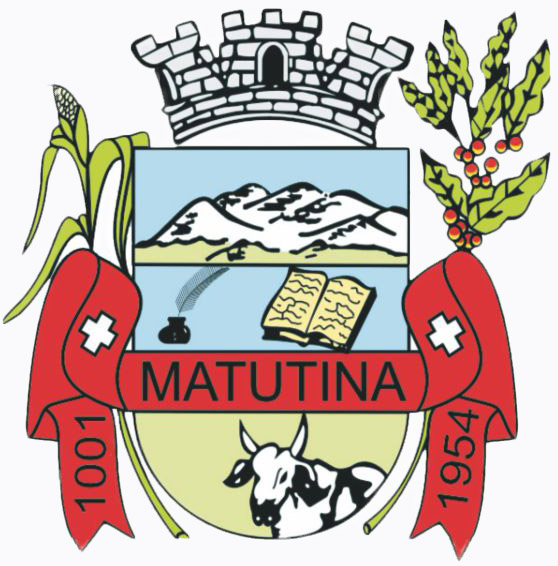
- Flag Coat of arms
- Interactive map of Matutina
- Country: Brazil
- State: Minas Gerais
- Region: Southeast
- Time zone: UTC−3 (BRT)

Location of Matutina in Minas Gerais

Matutina is a Brazilian municipality located in the northwest of the state of Minas Gerais. Its population as of 2020 was 3,741 people living in a total area of 260 km^{2} (100 sq mi). The city belongs to the mesoregion of Triângulo Mineiro e Alto Paranaiba and to the microregion of Patos de Minas. It became a municipality in 1953.

== Geography ==
The urban center is located at an elevation of 1,040 meters southeast of Patos de Minas in the Rio Borrachudo valley. Neighboring municipalities are: Tiros and Arapuá (N), São Gotardo (E), São Gotardo (S), and Rio Paranaíba (W).

=== Distances ===
- Patos de Minas: 152 km
- São Gotardo: 15 km
- Belo Horizonte: 288 km

== Economic activities ==
The most important economic activities are cattle raising, commerce, and agriculture, especially the growing of coffee. The GDP in 2005 was R$ R$27 million, with 13 generated by services, 02 million generated by industry, and 11 million generated by agriculture. Matutina is in the top tier of municipalities in the state with regard to economic and social development. As of 2007 there was 01 banking agency in the town. There was a modest retail infrastructure serving the surrounding area of cattle and agricultural lands. There were 558 automobiles in all of the municipality (2007), about one for every 07 inhabitants.

In the rural area there were 330 establishments occupying 12,000 hectares (planted area, 1,100 ha, and natural pasture, 10,000 ha.) (2006). About 800 persons were employed in agriculture. 56 of the farms had tractors, a ratio of one in 06 farms. There were 20,000 head of cattle in 2006. The main crops were coffee, oranges, beans and corn.

== Health and education ==
In the health sector there were 03 health clinics and one hospital with 23 beds. In the educational sector there were 03 pre-primary schools, 03 primary schools, and 01 middle school.

- Municipal Human Development Index: 0.766 (2000)
- State ranking: 187 out of 853 municipalities as of 2000
- National ranking: 1,432 out of 5,138 municipalities as of 2000
- Literacy rate: 85%
- Life expectancy: 73 (average of males and females)

The highest ranking municipality in Minas Gerais in 2000 was Poços de Caldas with 0.841, while the lowest was Setubinha with 0.568. Nationally the highest was São Caetano do Sul in São Paulo with 0.919, while the lowest was Setubinha. In more recent statistics (considering 5,507 municipalities) Manari in the state of Pernambuco has the lowest rating in the country—0,467—putting it in last place.

== See also ==
- List of municipalities in Minas Gerais
