= Ubaporanga Airport =

Ubaporanga Airport Aeroporto de Ubaporanga
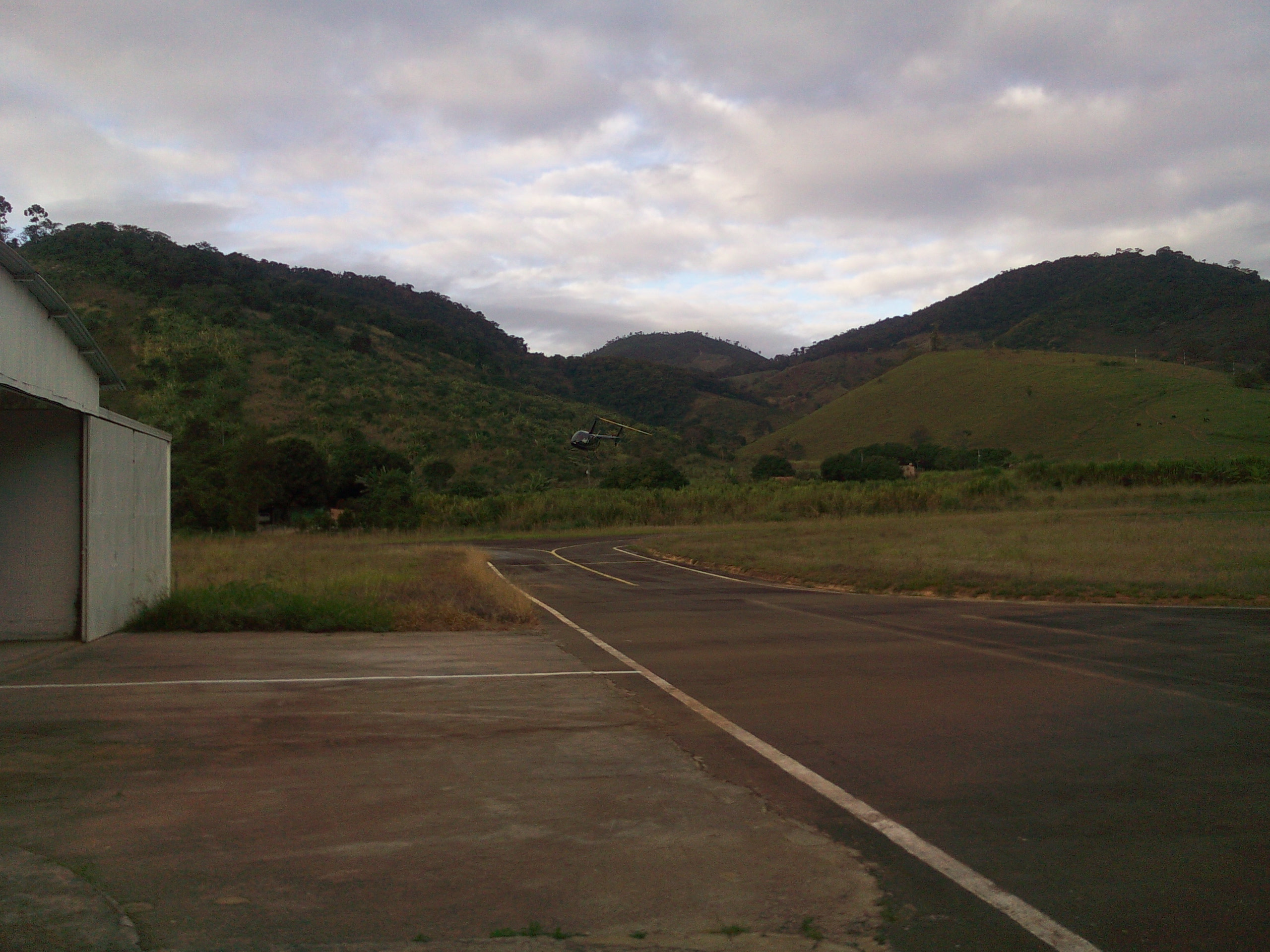
- IATA: none; ICAO: SNCT; LID: MG0056

Summary
- Airport type: Public
- Serves: Caratinga
- Location: Ubaporanga, Brazil
- Time zone: BRT (UTC−03:00)
- Elevation AMSL: 599 m (1,965 ft)
- Coordinates: 19°43′31″S 42°06′44″W

Map
- Location in Brazil SNCT (Brazil)

Runways
Direction	Length		Surface
Direction	m	ft	Surface
02/20	1,080	3,543	Asphalt
- Sources: ANAC, DECEA

Ubaporanga Regional Airport, also known as Caratinga Airport (ICAO: SNCT), is a regional airport located in the Brazilian municipality of Ubaporanga, in the interior of the state of Minas Gerais. It serves the municipality of Caratinga, which is part of the metropolitan area of Vale do Aço. However, its operations are limited to daytime and small aircraft.

Its runway is asphalt and 1,080 meters long. It is located near BR-116, in the village of Córrego das Palmeiras.

== Accident in 2021 ==
See main article: Beechcraft King Air accident registration PT-ONJ in 2021

On November 5, 2021, a twin-engine Beechcraft King Air, registration PT-ONJ, crashed four kilometers from the runway, in a waterfall in the municipality of Piedade de Caratinga, while preparing to land at the airport. The crash killed all on board, including two crew members and three passengers, among them the singer Marília Mendonça. The aircraft was coming from Goiânia International Airport and was transporting the artist to a show she was going to perform in Caratinga that same day. Before hitting the ground, the plane struck high-voltage tower cables which, according to pilot reports, had interfered with landings in previous months.

== Commercial flights ==
From April 3, 2018, to June 30, 2019, the Voe Minas Gerais program operated flights between Pampulha Airport and Caratinga Airport from Monday to Friday using the Cessna Caravan aircraft from the air taxi company Two Flex (now Azul Conecta). Commercial flights at the location were discontinued due to the end of the program.

== See also ==
- List of airports in Brazil
