= Cedro do Abaeté =

Town and municipality in the state of Minas Gerais, Brazil

Coordinates: 19°08′54″S 45°42′41″W

- Municipality
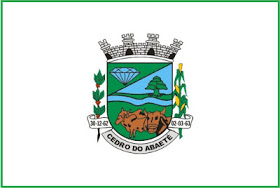
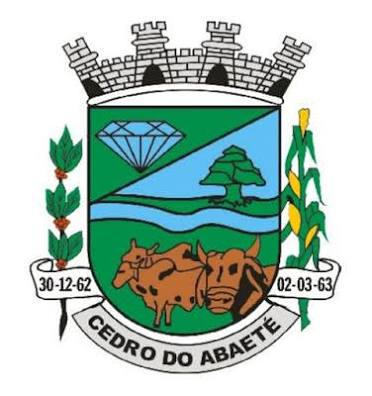
- Flag Coat of arms
- Interactive map of Cedro do Abaeté
- Country: Brazil
- State: Minas Gerais
- Region: Southeast

Population (2022 Census)
  - Total: 1,081
  - Estimate (2025): 1,084
- Time zone: UTC−3 (BRT)

Location of Cedro do Abaeté within Minas Gerais

Cedro do Abaeté is a Brazilian municipality in the north of the state of Minas Gerais. In 2025, the population was 1,084 in a total area of 283 km^{2} (109 sq mi). It became a municipality in 1962.

== Geography ==
Cedro do Abaeté belongs to the statistical micro-region of Três Marias. It is located at an elevation of 931 meters between the Indaiá River and the São Francisco River. Neighboring municipalities are:

- North: Paineiras
- West: Tiros
- South: Quartel Geral
- East: Abaeté

=== Distances ===
- Três Marias: 176 km
- Abaeté: 34 km
- Belo Horizonte: 249

Connections to the east and west are made on MG-352.

== Economic activities ==
The most important economic activities are cattle raising, commerce and agriculture. The GDP in 2005 was R$ R$6 million of which 4 million came from services. Cedro do Abaeté is in the middle tier of municipalities in the state with regard to economic and social development. In 2007, there were no banking agencies in the town. There was a small retail infrastructure serving the surrounding area of cattle and agricultural lands. There were 119 automobiles in all of the municipality (2007), about one for every 10 inhabitants.

In the rural area there were 95 establishments occupying 13,000 hectares (2006). About 150 persons were employed in agriculture. Six of the farms had tractors, a ratio of one in fifteen farms. There were 7,800 head of cattle in 2006. In permanent crops there were 14 ha. planted, while in perennial crops 107 ha. were planted (2006). The main crops were rice, sugarcane and corn.

== Health and education ==
In the health sector there were three health clinics. In the educational sector there were two primary schools and one middle school.

- Municipal Human Development Index: 0.746 (2000)
- State ranking: 302 out of 853 municipalities as of 2000
- National ranking: 1,938 out of 5,138 municipalities as of 2000
- Literacy rate: 82%
- Life expectancy: 74 (average of males and females)

The highest ranking municipality in Minas Gerais in 2000 was Poços de Caldas with 0.841, while the lowest was Setubinha with 0.568. Nationally the highest was São Caetano do Sul in São Paulo with 0.919, while the lowest was Setubinha. In more recent statistics (considering 5,507 municipalities) Manari in the state of Pernambuco has the lowest rating in the country—0,467—putting it in last place.

== See also ==
- List of municipalities in Minas Gerais
