= Morada Nova de Minas =

Human settlement in Brazil

Coordinates: 18°36′17″S 45°21′26″W

- Municipality
- Interactive map of Morada Nova de Minas
- Country: Brazil
- State: Minas Gerais
- Region: Southeast

Population (2022 Census)
  - Total: 9,067
  - Estimate (2025): 9,414
- Time zone: UTC−3 (BRT)

Location of Morada Nova de Minas within Minas Gerais

Morada Nova de Minas is a Brazilian municipality in the north of the state of Minas Gerais. As of 2025 the population was 9,414 in a total area of 2,085 km^{2}. It became a municipality in 1943.

== Geography ==
Morada Nova de Minas belongs to the statistical micro-region of Três Marias. It is located at an elevation of 594 meters on the banks of the Três Marias Dam, which dams up the São Francisco River. Neighboring municipalities are:

- Northeast: Três Marias
- Northwest: São Gonçalo do Abaeté
- West: Tiros
- South: Abaeté, Biquinhas, and Pompeu
- East: Felixlândia

When the Três Marias reservoir was filled it formed an island in Morada Nova de Minas that became the Pirapitinga Ecological Station, with an area of about 1,090 hectares (2,700 acres).

=== Distances ===
- Três Marias: 67 km
- Biquinhas: 25 km
- Belo Horizonte: 292 km
- Brasília: 570 km

Connections to the north and south are made on MG-415, with vehicles crossing the reservoir on a ferry.

== Economic activities ==
The most important economic activities are cattle raising, commerce, and agriculture. The GDP in 2005 was R$ R$51 million of which 28 million came from services and 17 million came from agriculture. Morada Nova de Minas is in the middle tier of municipalities in the state with regard to economic and social development. As of 2007 there was one banking agency in the town. There was a small retail infrastructure serving the surrounding area of cattle and agricultural lands. There were 667 automobiles in all of the municipality (2007), about one for every 11 inhabitants.

In the rural area there were 306 establishments occupying 130,000 hectares (2006). About 1,800 persons were employed in agriculture. 73 of the farms had tractors, a ratio of one in four farms. There were 50,000 head of cattle in 2006. In permanent crops there were 11,000 ha. planted, while in perennial crops 3,000 ha. were planted (2006). The main crops were rice, soybeans, and corn. A major agricultural activity is extraction of charcoal, which is shipped by truck to be used in the industries of the Belo Horizonte region. Fishing is also important for the economy with lake fishing and raising of fish in tanks.

== Health and education ==
In the health sector there was 08 health clinics and 01 hospital with 21 beds. In the educational sector there were 09 primary schools and 01 middle school.

- Municipal Human Development Index: 0.760 (2000)
- State ranking: 210 out of 853 municipalities as of 2000
- National ranking: 1,589 out of 5,138 municipalities as of 2000
- Literacy rate: 86%
- Life expectancy: 74 (average of males and females)

The highest ranking municipality in Minas Gerais in 2000 was Poços de Caldas with 0.841, while the lowest was Setubinha with 0.568. Nationally the highest was São Caetano do Sul in São Paulo with 0.919, while the lowest was Setubinha. In more recent statistics (considering 5,507 municipalities) Manari in the state of Pernambuco has the lowest rating in the country—0,467—putting it in last place.

== History ==
The settlement of this region began in 1737, with José Faria Pereira, the first landowner registered. Between 1810 and 1815 Dona Inácia Maria do Rosário, who lived on the Fazenda Saco Bom had a chapel built to Nossa Senhora do Loreto to accommodate Franciscan missionaries who had come from Pernambuco. Later, with the success of these friars, a two-story house was built next to the chapel, which was called her "Morada Nova". In 1938 the village was given "vila" status with the new name of Morada Nova. In 1943 the district was elevated to the category of municipality with the name of Morada, later changed to Moravânia, and still later changed to Morada Nova de Minas.

In 1960 with the reservoir of Três Marias the lands of the town were flooded and it began to stagnate economically. The population at that time was 18,000 inhabitants and many of the farmers lost their lands. With the possibility of tourism offered by the lake the town has grown again.

== See also ==
- List of municipalities in Minas Gerais
