= Major Porto =

Coordinates: 18°42′S 46°03′W

Major Porto is a district of Patos de Minas, a municipality in the state of Minas Gerais in the Southeast region of Brazil.

== See also ==
- Patos de Minas
