= Varjão de Minas =

Municipality of Minas Gerais, Brazil

Coordinates: 18°22′40″S 46°01′55″W

- Municipality
- Interactive map of Varjão de Minas
- Country: Brazil
- State: Minas Gerais
- Region: Southeast
- Time zone: UTC−3 (BRT)

Location of Varjão de Minas in the state of Minas Gerais

Varjão de Minas is a municipality in the north of the Brazilian state of Minas Gerais. Its population in 2020 was 7,138 inhabitants in a total area of 653 km^{2}.

Varjão de Minas belongs to the Paracatu statistical microregion. The elevation of the municipal seat is 900 meters. It became a municipality in 1995. This municipality is located on federal highway BR-3658 km. northeast of Patos de Minas.

Neighboring municipalities are: Presidente Olegário, São Gonçalo do Abaeté, João Pinheiro and Bom Sucesso de Patos.

The main economic activities are cattle raising (32,000 head in 2006) and farming. There was also production of charcoal from eucalyptus plantations. This charcoal is transported to the industrial region near Belo Horizonte to be used in the steel and iron industry. The GDP was R$69,613,000 (2005). There were 02 banking agencies in 2006. In the rural area there were 277 farms with 50,000 hectares of agricultural land, 6,000 hectares of which were planted, 28,000 were in natural pasture, and 13,000 were in woodland or forest. Around 1,000 people were involved in the agricultural sector. There were 90 tractors, a ratio of one tractor for every 30 farms. The main crops were rice, sugarcane, beans, tomatoes, soybeans, and corn. In the health sector there were 2 health clinics. Patos de Minas, 50 km. away on paved roads has complete health facilities.

The score on the Municipal Human Development Index was 0.736. This ranked Varjão de Minas 380 out of 853 municipalities in the state, with Poços de Caldas in first place with 0.841 and Setubinha in last place with 0.568.

== See also ==
- List of municipalities in Minas Gerais
