= Rio Paranaíba =

Municipality in Minas Gerais, Brazil

Coordinates: 19°11′38″S 46°14′49″W

- Municipality
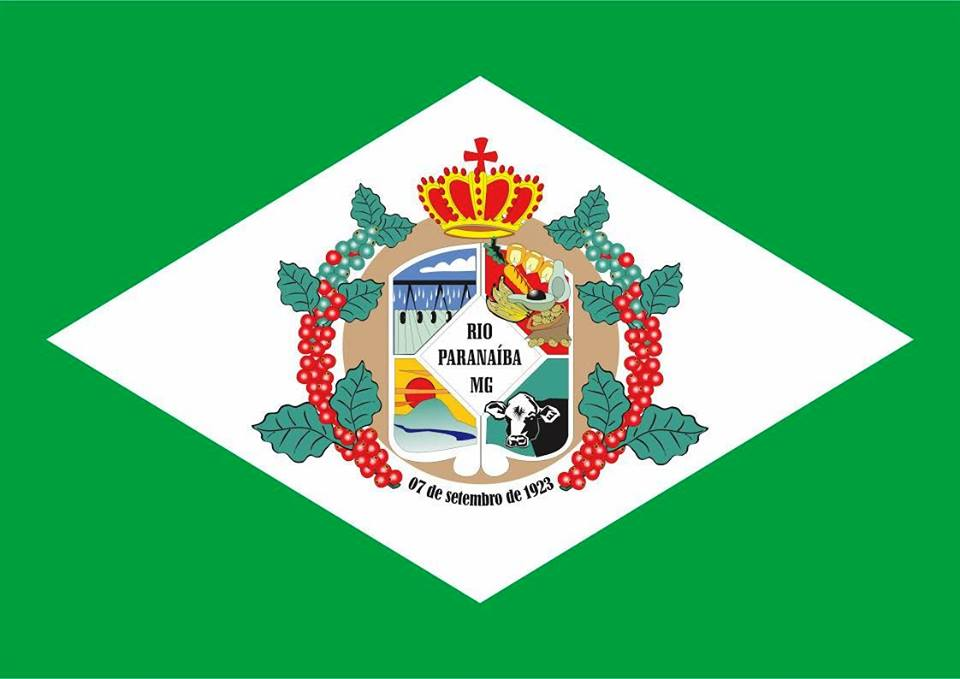
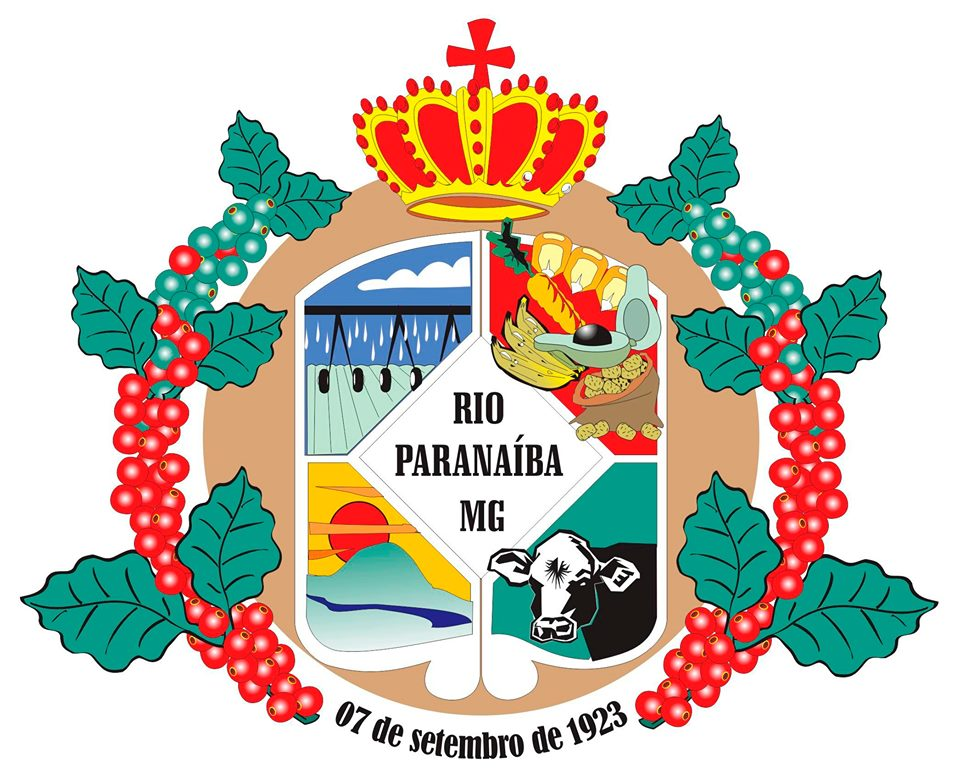
- Flag Coat of arms
- Interactive map of Rio Paranaíba
- Country: Brazil
- State: Minas Gerais
- Region: Southeast
- Time zone: UTC−3 (BRT)

Location of Rio Paranaíba in Minas Gerais

Rio Paranaíba is a Brazilian municipality in the northwest of the state of Minas Gerais. Its population as of 2020 was 12,335 people living in a total area of 1,353 km^{2} (522 sq mi). The city belongs to the mesoregion of Triângulo Mineiro e Alto Paranaíba and to the microregion of Patos de Minas. It became a municipality in 1923.

== Geography ==
The urban center is located at an elevation of 1,040 meters southeast of Patos de Minas in the Rio Borrachudo valley. Neighboring municipalities are: Carmo do Paranaíba and Arapuá (N), São Gotardo and Matutina (E), Araxá and Campos Altos (S), and Serra do Salitre (W).

=== Distances ===
- Patos de Minas: 83 km
- Carmo do Paranaíba: 42 km
- Belo Horizonte: 359 km

== Economic activities ==
The most important economic activities are cattle raising, commerce, and agriculture, especially the growing of coffee, corn and soybeans. The GDP in 2005 was R$ R$251 million, with 63 generated by services, 06 million generated by industry, and 172 million generated by agriculture. Rio Paranaíba is in the top tier of municipalities in the state with regard to economic and social development. As of 2007 there was 01 banking agency in the town. There was a modest retail infrastructure serving the surrounding area of cattle and agricultural lands. There were 1,518 automobiles in all of the municipality (2007), about one for every 07 inhabitants.

Rio Paranaíba was a large producer of agricultural products. In the rural area there were 1,262 establishments (2006) occupying 105,000 hectares (planted area—29,000 ha, and natural pasture—10,000 ha.). About 7,000 persons were employed in agriculture. 236 of the farms had tractors, a ratio of one in 06 farms. There were 54,000 head of cattle in 2006. The main crops were:

- coffee: 15,300 hectares
- avocado: 630 hectares
- garlic: 900 hectares
- potatoes: 1,280 hectares
- beans: 1,400 hectares
- corn: 10,400 hectares
- soybeans: 10,000 hectares
- wheat: 3,000 hectares

== Health and education ==
In the health sector there were 14 health clinics and one hospital with 28 beds. In the educational sector there were 07 pre-primary schools, 12 primary schools, and 01 middle school. There was a campus of the Universidade Federal de Viçosa, created in 2006. It offered courses in agronomy and administration.

- Municipal Human Development Index: 0.755 (2000)
- State ranking: 245 out of 853 municipalities as of 2000
- National ranking: 1,721 out of 5,138 municipalities as of 2000
- Literacy rate: 90%
- Life expectancy: 71 (average of males and females)

The highest ranking municipality in Minas Gerais in 2000 was Poços de Caldas with 0.841, while the lowest was Setubinha with 0.568. Nationally the highest was São Caetano do Sul in São Paulo with 0.919, while the lowest was Setubinha. In more recent statistics (considering 5,507 municipalities) Manari in the state of Pernambuco has the lowest rating in the country—0,467—putting it in last place.

== See also ==
- List of municipalities in Minas Gerais
