= Biquinhas =

Coordinates: 18°47′03″S 45°30′06″W

- Municipality
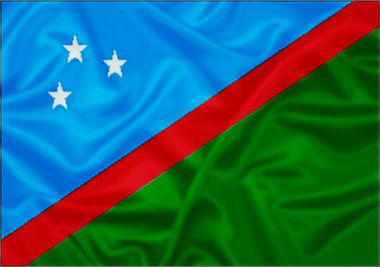
- Flag Coat of arms

- Country: Brazil
- State: Minas Gerais

Population (2022 Census)
  - Total: 2,383
  - Estimate (2025): 2,397
- Time zone: UTC−3 (BRT)

Biquinhas is a municipality in the north of the Brazilian state of Minas Gerais. As of 2025, the population was 2,397 in a total area of 458 square kilometers. It became a municipality in 1962.

== Geography ==
Biquinhas belongs to the statistical micro-region of Três Marias. It is located at an elevation of 629 meters between the Indaiá River and the reservoir of Três Marias. Neighboring municipalities are:

- North and East: Morada Nova de Minas
- West: Tiros
- South: Paineiras

=== Distances ===
- Três Marias: 92 km
- Abaeté: 44 km
- Belo Horizonte: 268

Connections to the north are made on MG-415 to Morada Nova de Minas; to the south on MG-060 to Abaeté.

== Economic activities ==
The most important economic activities are cattle raising, commerce, and agriculture. The GDP in 2005 was R$ R$17 million of which most came from services and agriculture. Biquinhas is in the middle tier of municipalities in the state with regard to economic and social development. As of 2007 there were no banking agencies in the town. There was a small retail infrastructure serving the surrounding area of cattle and agricultural lands. There were 404 automobiles in all of the municipality (2007), about one for every 6 inhabitants.

In the rural area there were 466 establishments occupying 40,000 hectares. About 900 persons were employed in agriculture. 42 of the farms had tractors, a ratio of one in ten farms. There were 20,000 head of cattle in 2006. In permanent crops there were 72 ha. planted, while in perennial crops 1,400 ha. were planted (2006). The crops with a planted area of more than 100 hectares were rice, sugarcane and corn.

== Health and education ==
In the health sector there was 03 health clinics. In the educational sector there were 02 primary schools and 01 middle school.

- Municipal Human Development Index: 0.746 (2000)
- State ranking: 316 out of 853 municipalities as of 2000
- National ranking: 1,992 out of 5,138 municipalities as of 2000
- Literacy rate: 83%
- Life expectancy: 72 (average of males and females)

The highest ranking municipality in Minas Gerais in 2000 was Poços de Caldas with 0.841, while the lowest was Setubinha with 0.568. Nationally the highest was São Caetano do Sul in São Paulo with 0.919, while the lowest was Setubinha. In more recent statistics (considering 5,507 municipalities) Manari in the state of Pernambuco has the lowest rating in the country—0,467—putting it in last place.

== See also ==
- List of municipalities in Minas Gerais
