= Pirapitinga Ecological Station =

- Estação Ecológica de Pirapitinga
- IUCN category Ia (strict nature reserve)
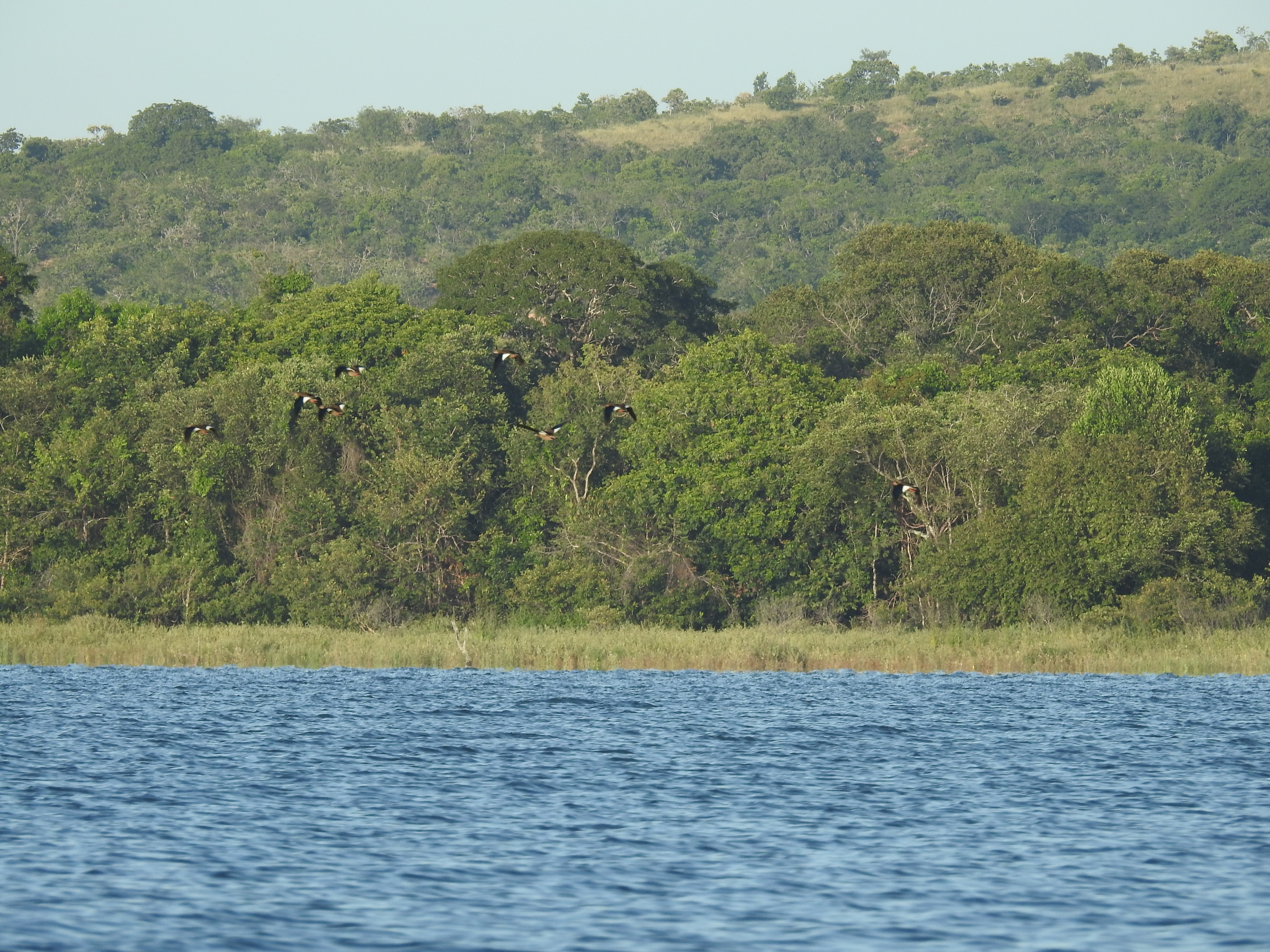

- Location within Brazil
- Nearest city: Três Marias, Minas Gerais
- Coordinates: 18°21′18″S 45°19′19″W
- Area: 1,384 hectares (3,420 acres)
- Designation: Ecological station
- Created: 20 July 1987

Pirapitinga Ecological Station (Portuguese: Estação Ecológica de Pirapitinga) is an ecological station in Brazil, on an island in the lake formed by the Três Marias Dam in Minas Gerais.

== Location ==
The reserve has an area of 1,384 hectares (3,420 acres) in the cerrado biome. It was created on 20 July 1987. It is managed by the Chico Mendes Institute for Biodiversity Conservation. It is located in the municipality of Morada Nova de Minas in the state of Minas Gerais. When the reservoir of the Três Marias Dam was filled in 1962 the station purchased the island that was formed when the reservoir was full. It has an area of about 1,090 hectares (2,700 acres) and a perimeter of 20 kilometres (12 mi). The lake is 600 metres (2,000 ft) above sea level. The highest point is 60 metres (200 ft) above lake level.

Average annual rainfall is 1,200 millimetres (47 in). Temperature ranges from 18 to 23 °C (64 to 73 °F), with average of 21 °C (70 °F). Vegetation includes trees up to 20 metres (66 ft) high, with scattered Mata Mesofílica species among the Savannah species. There are distinct layers of savannah vegetation: grasses, shrubs up to 3 metres (9.8 ft), trees from 8 to 10 metres (26 to 33 ft) and trees over 15 metres (49 ft). Endemic fauna include curl-crested jay (Cyanocorax cristatellus), peach-fronted parakeet (Eupsittula aurea), shrike-like tanager (Neothraupis fasciata), white-eared puffbird (Nystalus chacuru) and red-bellied macaw (Orthopsittaca manilatus).

== Conservation ==
The Ecological Station is a "strict nature reserve" under IUCN protected area category Ia. It was created to protect the environment and support basic and applied ecological research and education in conservation. The station is a habitat for the near threatened maned wolf and the giant anteater.

== Sources ==
- Estação Ecológica de Pirapitinga (in Portuguese), Chico Mendes Institute for Biodiversity Conservation
- "Estação Ecológica de Pirapitinga", ViaRural (in Portuguese), archived from the original on December 30, 2017
- Unidade de Conservação: Estação Ecológica de Pirapitinga (in Portuguese), MMA: Ministério do Meio Ambiente
