= Três Marias Dam =

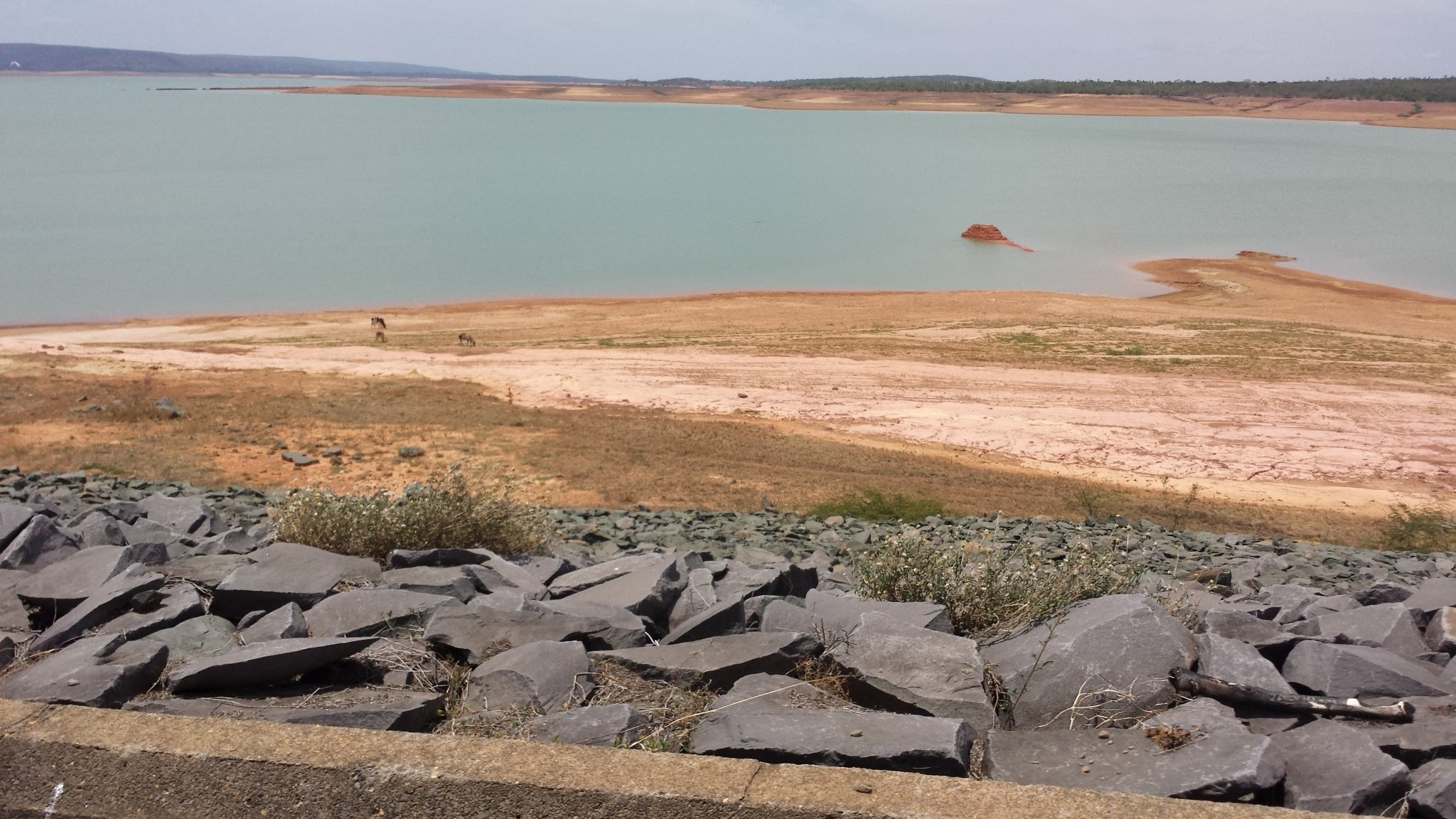

- Location within Brazil
- Official name: Usina de Bernardo Mascarenhas
- Location: Três Marias, Minas Gerais, Brazil
- Coordinates: 18°12′51″S 45°15′46″W
- Construction began: 1957
- Opening date: 1961
- Owner: CEMIG

Dam and spillways
- Type of dam: Embankment
- Impounds: São Francisco River
- Height: 75 m (246 ft)
- Length: 2,700 m (8,900 ft)
- Spillway type: Service, gate-controlled chute

Reservoir
- Creates: Três Marias Reservoir
- Total capacity: 21 km^{3} (17,000,000 acre⋅ft)
- Surface area: 1,040 km^{2} (400 sq mi)

Bernard Mascarenhas Power Plant
- Commission date: 1962-1969
- Type: Conventional
- Turbines: 6 x 64.6 MW (86,600 hp) Kaplan turbines
- Installed capacity: 387.6 MW (519,800 hp)

The Três Marias Dam, also known as Bernardo Mascarenhas, is an embankment dam on the São Francisco River near Três Marias in Minas Gerais, Brazil. It was constructed for hydroelectric power production and flood control. The dam was completed in 1961 and its first generator was operational in 1962. The dam's power plant is named after Bernard Mascarenhas who in 1889, built South America's first major hydroelectric power plant in Brazil, the Marmelos Zero Power Plant.

== Background ==
Construction on the dam began in May 1957 with a goal to stabilize the river's flow, improve navigation and to produce hydroelectric power. 10,000 people worked on the project and Brazilian President Juscelino Kubitschek was influential in the dam's construction pace. The majority of the dam works were completed in January 1961 and its first generator was operational in 1962. The other five generators went online by 1969. The dam does not have a fish ladder and effectively halted fish migration in the upper São Francisco River while also splitting it into two zones. When the reservoir was filled it formed an island that became the Pirapitinga Ecological Station, with an area of about 1,090 hectares (2,700 acres).

== Specifications ==
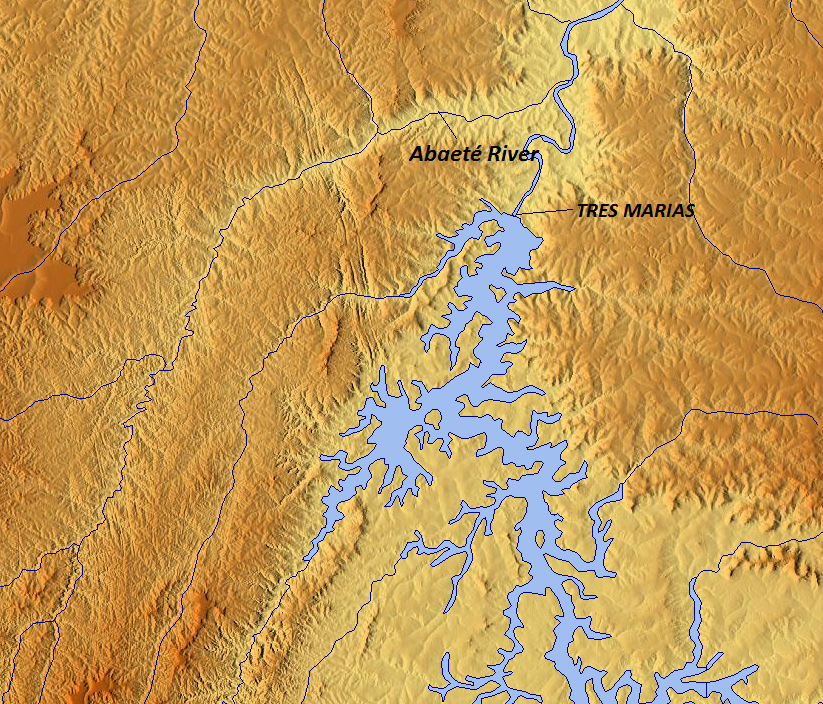
Location of Três Marias Dam

The dam is a 2,700-metre (8,900 ft) long and 75-metre (246 ft) high embankment dam with a spillway off to its east-side and a power plant at its east toe. The dam's reservoir has a surface area of 1,040 square kilometres (400 sq mi) and a capacity of 21 cubic kilometres (17,000,000 acre⋅ft).

== Bernard Mascarenhas Power Plant ==
The dam's power station, Bernard Mascarenhas Power Plant, contains six 64.6 megawatts (86,600 hp) generators powered by Kaplan turbines for a total installed capacity of 387.6 megawatts (519,800 hp). There is additional room for two more generators in the power station which would increase the capacity to 516.85 megawatts (693,110 hp) if installed. The Kaplan turbines used in the power station were designed by Voith and first installed in 1958. Each one has eight runner blades and is designed to operate with a hydraulic head as low as 50 metres (160 ft). The dam regulates downstream water flows to other reservoirs and power plants, keeping a normal discharge of 500 cubic metres per second (18,000 cu ft/s).

== See also ==
- List of power stations in Brazil
