= Três Marias =

Human settlement in Brazil

Coordinates: 18°12′S 45°14′W

- Municipality
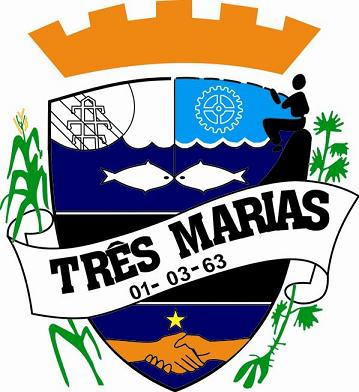
- Coat of arms
- Interactive map of Três Marias
- Country: Brazil
- State: Minas Gerais
- Region: Southeast

Population (2022 Census)
  - Total: 28,895
  - Estimate (2025): 29,985
- Time zone: UTC−3 (BRT)

Location of Três Marias within Minas Gerais

Três Marias is a Brazilian municipality located in the northwestern part of the state of Minas Gerais. In 2020 the population was 32,716 in a total area of 2,763 km^{2}.

== Geography ==
Três Marias is located at the north end of one of the largest reservoirs in Brazil—the Represa Três Marias—and is close to the dam which controls water entering the São Francisco river. The city lies on the important federal highway BR-040, which links Belo Horizonte to Brasília. Neighboring municipalities are: Buritizeiro, Lassance, (N), Felixlândia (S), Corinto (E) Morada Nova and São Gonçalo do Abaeté (W).

=== Climate ===
The climate is tropical semi-humid, with an annual average temperature of 22.5 °C (72.5 °F), and an average annual maximum of 28.8 °C (83.8 °F); average annual minimum: 16.5 °C (61.7 °F); average annual rainfall: 1,442 mm (56.77 inches). The altitude varies between 504 and 975 m (1,654 and 3,199 ft).

== Três Marias Statistical Micro-region ==
Três Marias is also a statistical microregion including the following municipalities: Abaeté, Biquinhas, Cedro do Abaeté, Morada Nova de Minas, Paineiras, Pompeu, and Três Marias. In 2011 the population was 28,315 inhabitants in a total area of 2.683,0 km^{2}. The population density was 10,55 inhabitants/km^{2} (2000)

== Economy ==
The economy is based on agriculture, cattle raising, tourism, light industry and the informal economy. The GDP in 2005 was R$839 million, of which 515 million was generated by industry—namely, the hydroelectric plant of Três Marias. There were 03 banks. The number of automobiles for the municipality was 3,708 (2007), one for every 7 inhabitants. In 2006 the largest employer was public administration with around 1,200 workers.

In the rural area there were 420 establishments on 113,000 hectares. More than half of the area was natural pasture. 1,500 persons were occupied in agriculture. 74 of the farms had tractors, a ratio of one in six. The cattle herd had 28,000 head. The main crops were rice, sugarcane, corn, and soybeans. In general terms the agricultural production was modest for a municipality of such a large area.

== Health and education ==
In 2005 there were 19 clinics (14 public and 05 private) and 01 hospital (private) with 50 beds. The nearest cities with advanced health care were Patos de Minas, 170 km, and Belo Horizonte, 276 km. There were 15 pre-primary schools (10 public and 05 private), 24 primary schools (19 public and 05 private), and 04 middle schools (02 public and 02 private). There was a branch of one public institute of higher learning.

== Origin of the name ==
There are several versions of stories that explain the name of the city. There are those who affirm, based on astronomy, that it is because of the three stars belonging to the constellation Orion, and that are permanently visible in this region.

Another possible source of the name are the three waterfalls that once existed where the reservoir would eventually be built.

But the most popular explanation refers to three sisters who lived on the right bank of the river. This version talks of a couple who lived on the bank of the river who had triplets, a rare case even today. The story goes that their birth was a topic of subject of much discussion, with its fame spreading throughout the region. They were three beautiful girls all called Maria. But the waterfall where the couple lived with their three daughters began to be called the Waterfall of the Three Marias, which disappeared after the building of the dam. The legend adds that the three Marias died by drowning in the river. However, as there is no documentary evidence in any registrar to prove its veracity, the tale remains anecdotal. The less poetic, official name of the hydroelectric station is "Bernardo Mascarenhas".

== The lake and dam of Tres Marias ==
The lake of Tres Marias began with the damming of the São Francisco River, formed by the construction of one of the largest earth dams in the world. The objectives were to control the flow of water of the river in the periodical floods and improve navigability; the use of hydroelectric power and the development of industry and irrigation. Begun in 1957, this great project was finished in January 1961, almost a world record in this type of construction.

The dam is 2,700 m (8,900 ft) long with a height of 75 m (246 ft). Its plant produces 396,000 KW of power. The lake, known as the "Sweet Sea of Minas", has 21 billion cubic ms of water, a surface area of 1,040 square kilometres (402 square miles) (8.7 times greater than Guanabara Bay), and provides water to 8 municipalities; one of the many islands formed in the lake is an ecological station; the Estação Ecologica de Pirapitinga.

The speed of construction was due to the commitment of President Juscelino Kubitschek, who also completed the bridge over the São Francisco river, the BR 040 highway, and the new federal capital. The construction of the dam was carried out in two shifts, using approximately 10,000 workers.

== See also ==
- List of municipalities in Minas Gerais
