= Paracatu Airport =

Pedro Rabelo de Souza Airport Aeroporto Pedro Rabelo de Souza
- IATA: PYT; ICAO: SNZR; LID: MG0026

Summary
- Airport type: Public
- Operator: Infracea
- Serves: Paracatu
- Time zone: BRT (UTC−03:00)
- Elevation AMSL: 731 m (2,398 ft)
- Coordinates: 17°14′34″S 046°52′59″W

Map
- Location in Brazil PYT (Brazil)

Runways
| Direction | Length | | Surface |
| Direction | m | ft | Surface |
|---|---|---|---|
| 11/29 | 1,500 | 4,921 | Asphalt |
- Sources: ANAC, DECEA

Pedro Rabelo de Souza Airport (IATA: PYT, ICAO: SNZR) is the airport serving Paracatu, Brazil.

It is operated by Infracea.

== Airlines and destinations ==
| Airlines | Destinations |
|---|---|
| Azul Conecta | Belo Horizonte–Confins |

== Access ==
The airport is located 4 km (2 mi) from downtown Paracatu.

== See also ==
- List of airports in Brazil
