= Arapuá =

Town and municipality in the state of Minas Gerais, Brazil

Coordinates: 19°02′07″S 46°09′13″W

- Municipality
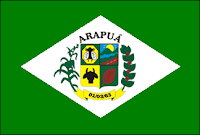
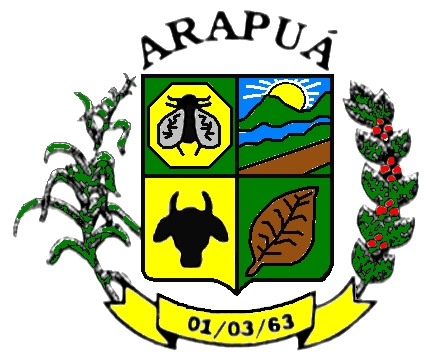
- Flag Coat of arms
- Interactive map of Arapuá
- Country: Brazil
- State: Minas Gerais
- Region: Southeast
- Time zone: UTC−3 (BRT)

Location of Arapuá in Minas Gerais

Arapuá is a Brazilian municipality located in the northwest of the state of Minas Gerais. Its population as of 2020 was 2,835 people living in a total area of 172 km^{2} (66 sq mi). The city belongs to the mesoregion of Triângulo Mineiro e Alto Paranaiba and to the microregion of Patos de Minas. It became a municipality in 1962.

== Geography ==
Arapuá is located at an elevation of 637 meters southeast of Patos de Minas. It is between the Paranaíba River and the Abaeté River. Neighboring municipalities are: Carmo do Paranaíba (N), Tiros (E), Matutina and Rio Paranaíba (S), and Carmo do Paranaíba (W).

=== Distances ===
- Carmo do Paranaíba: 30 km
- Patos de Minas: 84 km
- Belo Horizonte: 339 km

Connections to the north and south are made by reaching federal highway BR-354, a distance of 10 kilometers to the southwest. A dirt road links Arapuá to Quintinos in the north.

== Economic activities ==
The most important economic activities are cattle raising, commerce, and agriculture. The GDP in 2005 was R$ R$23 million, of which 8 million came from services, 5 million came from industry, and 9 million came from agriculture. Arapuá is in the top tier of municipalities in the state with regard to economic and social development. As of 2007 there were no banking agencies in the town. There was a small retail infrastructure serving the surrounding area of cattle and agricultural lands. There were 395 automobiles in all of the municipality (2007), about one for every 08 inhabitants.

In the rural area there were 373 establishments occupying 13,000 hectares (planted area, 1,000 ha and natural pasture 11,000 ha.) (2006). About 750 persons were employed in agriculture. 39 of the farms had tractors, a ratio of one in ten farms. There were 10,000 head of cattle in 2006. The main crops were coffee, rice and corn.

== Health and education ==
In the health sector there were 02 health clinics and 01 hospital with 12 beds. In the educational sector there was 01 primary school.

- Municipal Human Development Index: 0.775 (2000)
- State ranking: 135 out of 853 municipalities as of 2000
- National ranking: 1,170 out of 5,138 municipalities as of 2000
- Literacy rate: 87%
- Life expectancy: 73 (average of males and females)

The highest ranking municipality in Minas Gerais in 2000 was Poços de Caldas with 0.841, while the lowest was Setubinha with 0.568. Nationally the highest was São Caetano do Sul in São Paulo with 0.919, while the lowest was Setubinha. In more recent statistics (considering 5,507 municipalities) Manari in the state of Pernambuco has the lowest rating in the country—0,467—putting it in last place.

== See also ==
- List of municipalities in Minas Gerais
