= Paracatu, Minas Gerais =

Paracatu
- Municipality
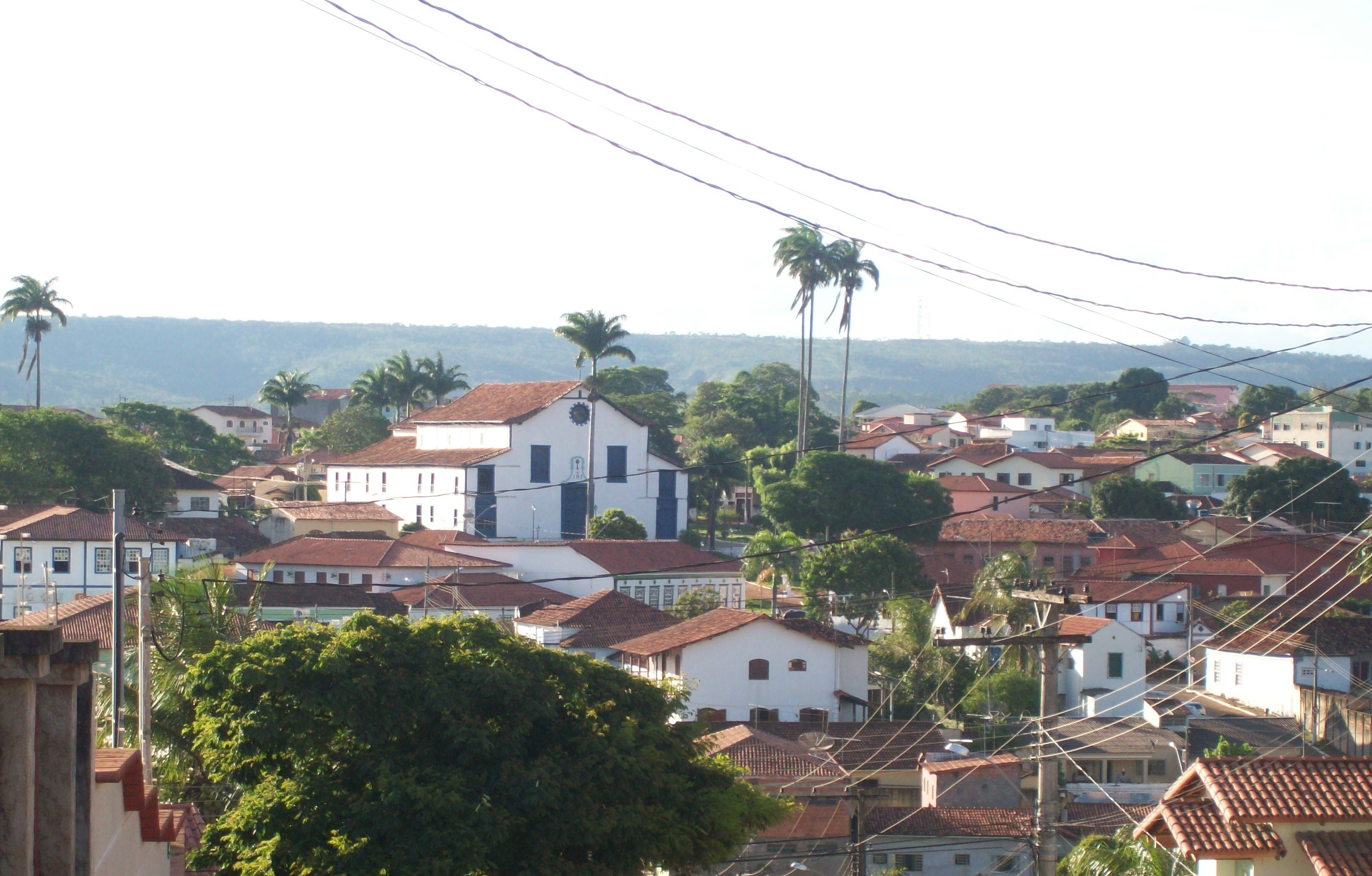
- Partial view of Paracatu

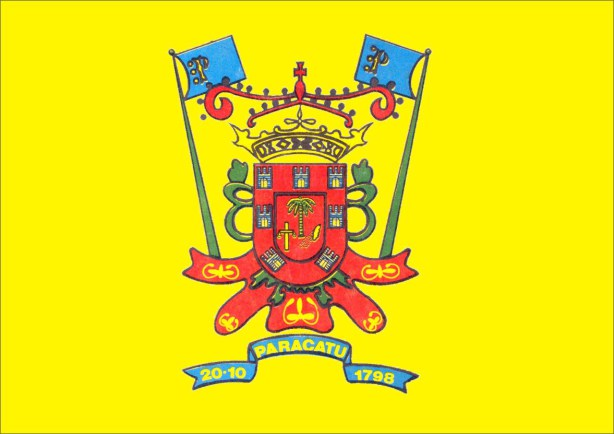
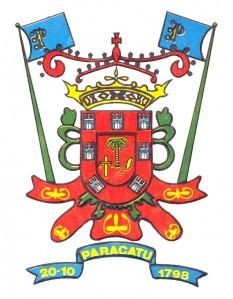
- Flag Coat of arms

- Localization of Paracatu in Minas Gerais

- Localization of Paracatu in Brazil
- Coordinates: 17°13′18″S 46°52′30″W
- Country: Brazil
- Region: Southeast
- State: Minas Gerais
- Founded: October 20, 1798

Government
  - Mayor: Olavo Remígio Condé (PSDB) (2013-2016)

Area
  - Total: 8,229.588 km^{2} (3,177.462 sq mi)
- Elevation: 688 m (2,257 ft)

Population (2020)
  - Total: 93,862
  - Density: 10.29/km^{2} (26.7/sq mi)
- Demonym: Paracatuense
- Time zone: UTC−3 (BRT)
- Postal Code (CEP): 38600-000
- Area code: +55 38
- Website: www.paracatu.mg.gov.br

Paracatu is a municipality in the state of Minas Gerais in Brazil. The name is from Tupi para ('river') + katu ('good'), thus meaning 'good river'.

== History ==
The region of Paracatu has been explored by Europeans since the end of the 16th century. In the middle of the 18th century deposits of gold and silver were discovered, and the area was settled. The settlement became the town Vila de Paracatu do Príncipe by royal charter in 1798.

== Economy ==
The economy is centered on gold mining and agriculture.

=== Mining ===
In Paracatu, gold has been mined since 1722. The Morro do Ouro (Paracatu) open-pit mine is operated by Rio Paracatu Mineração (RPM), a 100% owned subsidiary of the Canadian company Kinross Gold Corporation. The gold content of the ore is comparatively low, about 0.41 gram of gold for every ton of ore extracted. Annual production is about 15 tonnes of gold and 5 tonnes of silver.

Kinross Gold owns the open-pit Paracatu gold mine operated as Kinross Brasil Mineração S.A. that includes two process plants, two tailings facilities, as well as accompanying infrastructure. This mine is the region's largest employer. In 2015, Paracatu produced 477,662 gold equivalent ounces.

=== Agriculture ===
Cattle raising is the main agricultural activity with 231,000 head (1996). The main breeds are: Zebu (Gir, Indu-Brasil, Guzerá and Nelore), Girolanda, Frisian and Brown-Swiss. There is also large production of soybeans, corn, rice, beans, and also some coffee. Paracatu is the commercial center for an area one third the size of Portugal. In 2006 there were 6 banking branches: Banco do Brasil, Itaú, Bradesco, Banco Mercantil, Banco Bamerindus, and Caixa Econômica Federal. The GDP was R$754,090,000 (2005).

In 1978 the municipality began to receive investments from the Brazilian and the Japanese government to develop the cerrado soils, through the PRODECER-Programa de Cooperação Nipo-Brasileiro para o Desenvolviemnto do Cerrado.

Because of new technologies used to develop the cerrado, agriculture in Paracatu became efficient and profitable in many properties. Nowadays, the cultivated area in the municipality surpasses 1000 square kilometres, with 300 square kilometres irrigated by central pivot sprinklers. This number has raised Paracatu to the position of greatest continuous area irrigated by center pivot irrigation in South America, using 318 center pivot sprinklers.

==== Agricultural data ====
In 2006 there were 995 rural producers with total agricultural land of 389,095 ha. Of the total 85,000 ha. were planted, 180,000 ha. were in natural pasture, and 113,000 were in forest or woodland. Around 4,500 persons were employed in agriculture. There were 768 tractors. The planted area of some of the main crops in hectares was:

- Corn: 12,000
- Soybeans: 30,000
- Sorghum: 2,000
- Rice: 2,670
- Coffee: 1,050
- Cotton: 3,000
- Sugarcane: 1,600
- Beans: 9,100
- Watermelon: 1,050

== Quilombola population ==
Many quilombola (descendants of escaped slaves) communities live in and near Paracatu, often in poverty.

== Health and education ==
In 2005 there were 29 health establishments, 19 of which were public and 10 of which were private. There was 1 hospital with 139 beds. The score on the Municipal Human Development Index was 0.760. This ranked Paracatu 207 out of 853 municipalities in the state, with Poços de Caldas in first place with 0.841 and Setubinha in last place with 0.568.

Paracatu has 4 faculties with undergraduation and graduation courses: Faculdade Tecsoma, FINOM – Faculdade do Noroeste de Minas, Faculdade Unimontes, and Faculdade Atenas.

== Transportation ==
The city is served by Pedro Rabelo de Souza Airport.

== Climate ==
Paracatu has a tropical savanna climate (Köppen: Aw) with a hot rainy season and warm dry season.

Climate data for Paracatu (1991–2020 normals, extremes 1973–present)
Month	Jan	Feb	Mar	Apr	May	Jun	Jul	Aug	Sep	Oct	Nov	Dec	Year
Record high °C (°F)	36.4 (97.5)	37.2 (99.0)	35.6 (96.1)	34.8 (94.6)	34.4 (93.9)	33.9 (93.0)	34.4 (93.9)	36.2 (97.2)	39.7 (103.5)	40.2 (104.4)	39.0 (102.2)	37.2 (99.0)	40.2 (104.4)
Mean daily maximum °C (°F)	30.5 (86.9)	30.8 (87.4)	30.3 (86.5)	30.0 (86.0)	28.7 (83.7)	28.0 (82.4)	28.3 (82.9)	30.1 (86.2)	32.0 (89.6)	32.5 (90.5)	30.5 (86.9)	30.0 (86.0)	30.1 (86.2)
Daily mean °C (°F)	24.6 (76.3)	24.8 (76.6)	24.4 (75.9)	23.9 (75.0)	22.0 (71.6)	20.7 (69.3)	20.7 (69.3)	22.4 (72.3)	24.6 (76.3)	25.7 (78.3)	24.5 (76.1)	24.3 (75.7)	23.6 (74.5)
Mean daily minimum °C (°F)	20.3 (68.5)	20.3 (68.5)	20.1 (68.2)	19.2 (66.6)	16.7 (62.1)	15.1 (59.2)	14.7 (58.5)	15.8 (60.4)	18.5 (65.3)	20.2 (68.4)	20.1 (68.2)	20.2 (68.4)	18.4 (65.1)
Record low °C (°F)	11.7 (53.1)	12.4 (54.3)	12.7 (54.9)	10.0 (50.0)	5.1 (41.2)	4.3 (39.7)	4.5 (40.1)	6.8 (44.2)	8.1 (46.6)	10.6 (51.1)	12.0 (53.6)	10.8 (51.4)	4.3 (39.7)
Average precipitation mm (inches)	258.0 (10.16)	204.4 (8.05)	207.8 (8.18)	73.8 (2.91)	24.1 (0.95)	5.6 (0.22)	0.9 (0.04)	8.9 (0.35)	28.8 (1.13)	80.3 (3.16)	212.2 (8.35)	313.4 (12.34)	1,418.2 (55.83)
Average precipitation days (≥ 1.0 mm)	15.1	11.7	12.3	6.3	2.3	0.6	0.3	0.8	3.2	6.9	14.1	17.4	91.0
Average relative humidity (%)	76.9	75.8	78.2	75.0	72.6	69.1	63.4	55.9	54.7	60.3	74.3	78.7	69.6
Average dew point °C (°F)	20.6 (69.1)	20.7 (69.3)	20.9 (69.6)	19.8 (67.6)	17.6 (63.7)	15.8 (60.4)	14.4 (57.9)	14.0 (57.2)	15.4 (59.7)	17.6 (63.7)	19.9 (67.8)	20.6 (69.1)	18.1 (64.6)
Mean monthly sunshine hours	192.6	187.5	203.0	230.2	247.4	258.8	270.9	277.0	246.5	219.4	163.9	165.8	2,663
Source 1: NOAA
Source 2: Instituto Nacional de Meteorologia

== See also ==
- List of municipalities in Minas Gerais
