= Patos de Minas =

- Municipality
- Município de Patos de Minas; Municipality of Patos de Minas
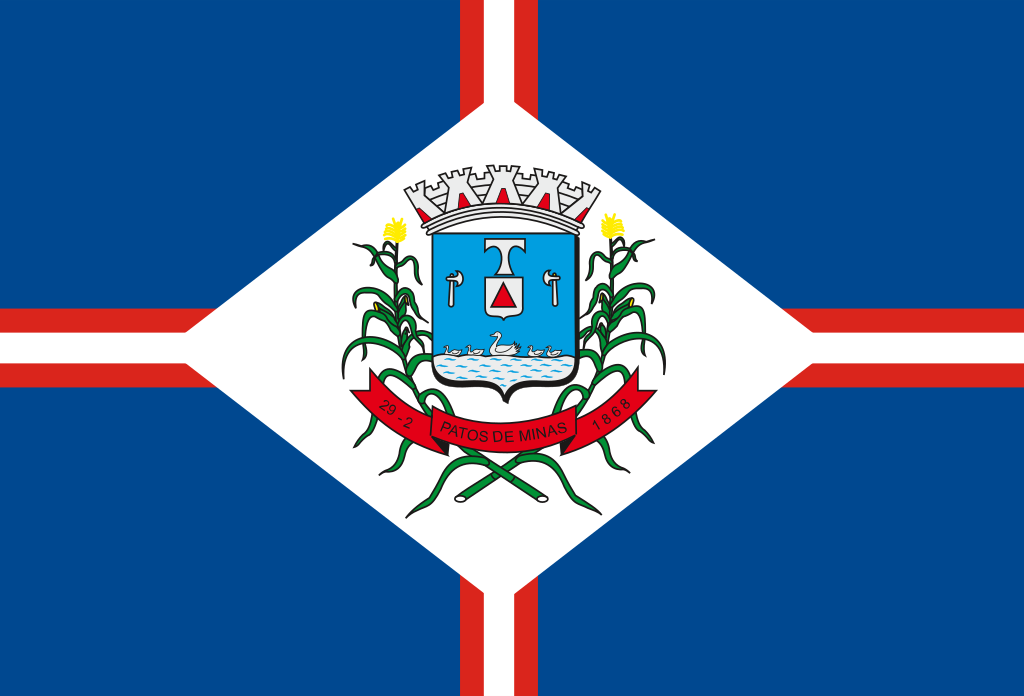
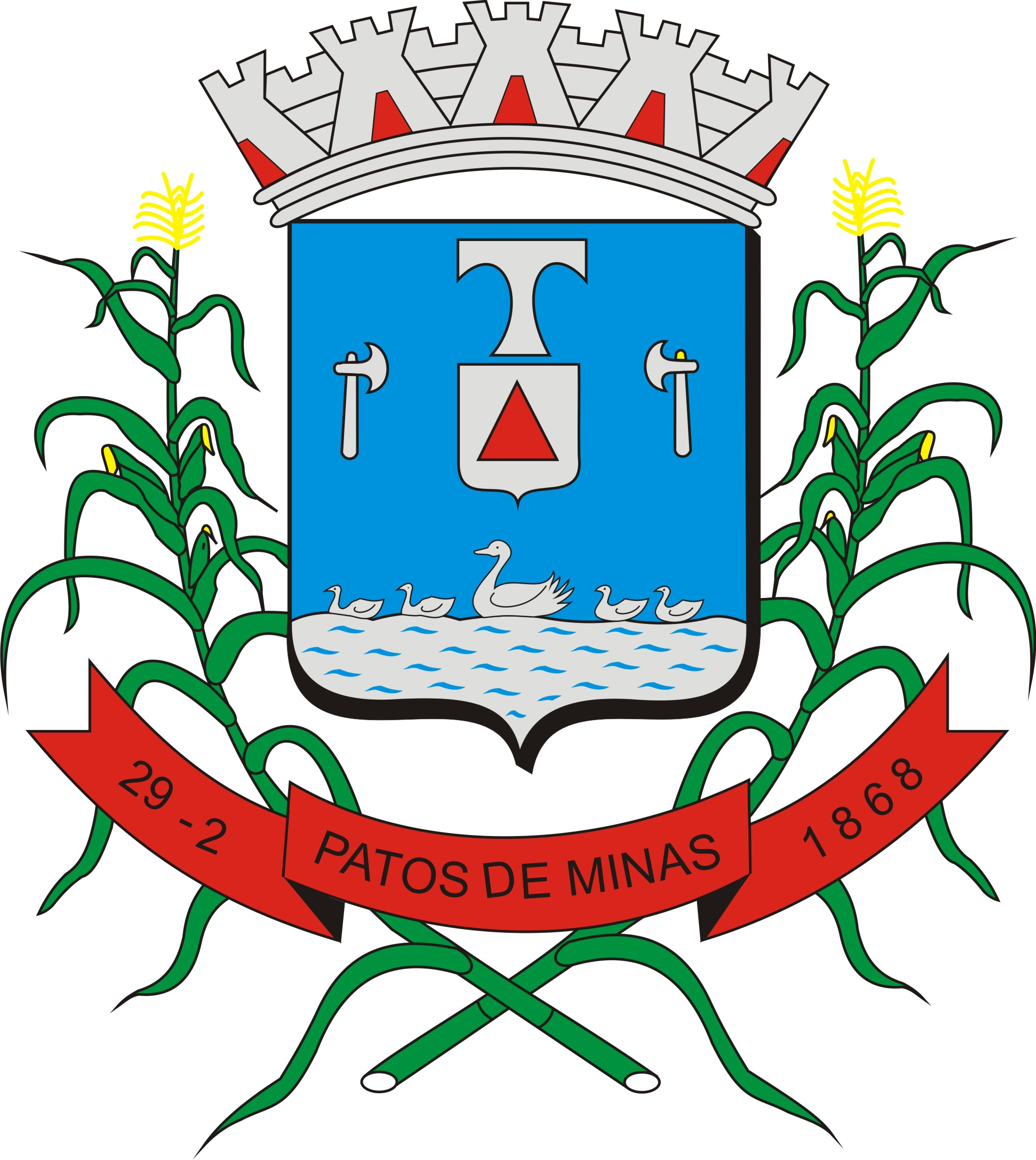
- Flag Coat of arms

- Localization of Patos de Minas in Minas Gerais

- Localization of Patos de Minas in Brazil
- Coordinates: 18°34′54″S 46°30′53″W
- Country: Brazil
- Region: Southeast
- State: Minas Gerais
- Founded: 1868

Area
  - Total: 3.189771 km^{2} (1.231577 sq mi)
- Elevation: 815 m (2,674 ft)

Population (2022 Census)
  - Total: 159,235
  - Estimate (2025): 169,173
- Demonym: Patense
- Time zone: UTC−3 (BRT)
- Postal Code (CEP): 38700-000
- Area code: +55 34
- Website: www.patosdeminas.mg.gov.br

Patos de Minas is a city in the state of Minas Gerais in Brazil.

According to the 2022 census, the municipality had a population of 159,434 inhabitants, a population density of 49.91 inhabitants per square kilometer, and an area of 3,190.456 km^{2} (1,231.842 sq mi). It is located in the Mesorregião do Triângulo Mineiro e Alto Paranaíba, 415 kilometers from the capital Belo Horizonte.

Its economy is based on agriculture, livestock, and mining activities, representing the 22nd largest GDP in Minas Gerais in 2020.

== Geography ==
According to the modern (2017) geographic classification by Brazil's National Institute of Geography and Statistics (IBGE), the city is the main municipality in the Intermediate Geographic Region of Patos de Minas.

== History ==
The name is derived from the ranch known as farmhouse Os Patos, owned by the original settlers, which had the name because of the large number of wild ducks found in the region. In 1826 the first settlers, Antônio da Silva Guerra and his wife, Luísa Correia de Andrade, donated lands for the new settlement, called Vila de Santo Antônio dos Patos. In 1892 Patos de Minas gained city status with the name of Patos, which was lengthened in 1944 to Patos de Minas.

== High standard of living ==
Patos de Minas occupies a privileged position in the ranking of cities in the state and country in socio-economic development. A study in Veja magazine in 2001 placed Patos in fifth place among five thousand cities with the greatest socio-economic development between 1970 and 1996.

Rare among Brazilian cities of this size, around 99% of all the streets of the city are paved and have public lighting and almost all of the inhabitants (97%) receive treated water. Sewage treatment reached 98% of the urban population. City government site

- Municipal Human Development Index: 0.813 (2000)
- State ranking: 19 out of 853 municipalities as of 2000
- National ranking: 318 out of 5,138 municipalities as of 2000
- Literacy rate: 92%
- Life expectancy: 74 (average of males and females)

The highest ranking municipality in Minas Gerais in 2000 was Poços de Caldas with 0.841, while the lowest was Setubinha with 0.568. Nationally the highest was São Caetano do Sul in São Paulo with 0.919, while the lowest was Setubinha. In more recent statistics (considering 5,507 municipalities) Manari in the state of Pernambuco has the lowest rating in the country—0,467—putting it in last place.

== Economy ==
The main sources of income are agriculture, services, light industry, and livestock raising. Dairy products, jerked beef, and pork by-products are processed in the city. In 2005 the GDP was R$1,217 billion, with 750 million generated by services, 189 million by industry, and 154 million by agriculture.

Patos is known nationally for its corn production. The "Princess of the Alto Paranaíba" as it is called, has become the national capital of corn, a fact that has attracted investors from all over the country to set up industries in agro-industry, garments, beverages, and packaging. It is also one of the most important seed producing centers in the country.

Corn is so important in the life of the town that every May Patos puts on a festival, the biggest in the state, called Fenamilho, the Festa Nacional do Milho (National Corn Festival), in which there are rodeos and performances by country and western groups.

Main crops in 2006

- Coffee: 5,700 ha.
- Cotton: 310 ha.
- Potatoes: 130 ha.
- Sugarcane: 170 ha.
- Beans: 3,000 ha.
- Manioc: 1,000 ha.
- Maize: 12,000 ha.
- Soybeans: 4,500 ha.
- Tomatoes: 446 ha.

Farm data in 2006

- Number of farms: 3,135
- Agricultural area: 232,334 ha.
- Planted area: 45,300 ha.
- Area of natural pasture: 208,109
- Persons working in agriculture: 11,400

== Health and Education in 2006 ==
- Number of primary schools: 47
- Enrollment in primary schools: 21,711
- Number of middle or secondary schools: 23
- Enrollment in middle or secondary schools: 7,063
- Higher education: 3 private schools with an enrollment of 4,834 in 2005.
- Hospitals: 1 public and 3 private with 366 beds (2005)
- Health clinics: 27 public and 4 private.

== Airport ==
Pedro Pereira dos Santos Airport, built in the early 1990s, can receive medium-sized passenger planes from the Brasília to the Fokker F-27. It is located 6.5 km. from the city. In March 2016, Flyways Airline started operating in the airport with 2 flights per week from Patos de Minas to the capital city Belo Horizonte.

== Climate ==
Patos de Minas experiences a tropical savanna climate (Köppen: Aw).

Climate data for Patos de Minas (1991–2020 normals, extremes 1961–present)
Month	Jan	Feb	Mar	Apr	May	Jun	Jul	Aug	Sep	Oct	Nov	Dec	Year
Record high °C (°F)	34.9 (94.8)	34.5 (94.1)	33.9 (93.0)	32.5 (90.5)	32.9 (91.2)	30.3 (86.5)	31.9 (89.4)	35.1 (95.2)	37.1 (98.8)	37.9 (100.2)	35.7 (96.3)	36.5 (97.7)	37.9 (100.2)
Mean daily maximum °C (°F)	28.8 (83.8)	29.4 (84.9)	28.8 (83.8)	28.5 (83.3)	27.0 (80.6)	26.3 (79.3)	26.6 (79.9)	28.6 (83.5)	30.2 (86.4)	30.4 (86.7)	28.6 (83.5)	28.5 (83.3)	28.5 (83.3)
Daily mean °C (°F)	22.7 (72.9)	22.9 (73.2)	22.4 (72.3)	21.8 (71.2)	19.8 (67.6)	18.9 (66.0)	19.1 (66.4)	20.7 (69.3)	22.7 (72.9)	23.4 (74.1)	22.5 (72.5)	22.5 (72.5)	21.6 (70.9)
Mean daily minimum °C (°F)	18.6 (65.5)	18.3 (64.9)	18.2 (64.8)	16.9 (62.4)	14.5 (58.1)	13.2 (55.8)	13.1 (55.6)	14.2 (57.6)	16.5 (61.7)	18.0 (64.4)	18.4 (65.1)	18.5 (65.3)	16.5 (61.7)
Record low °C (°F)	13.3 (55.9)	14.0 (57.2)	12.9 (55.2)	10.0 (50.0)	4.7 (40.5)	−1.2 (29.8)	1.9 (35.4)	4.5 (40.1)	9.6 (49.3)	11.7 (53.1)	11.7 (53.1)	14.1 (57.4)	−1.2 (29.8)
Average precipitation mm (inches)	275.5 (10.85)	177.3 (6.98)	206.9 (8.15)	70.5 (2.78)	33.2 (1.31)	11.8 (0.46)	3.8 (0.15)	7.3 (0.29)	43.3 (1.70)	93.8 (3.69)	207.6 (8.17)	302.4 (11.91)	1,433.4 (56.43)
Average precipitation days (≥ 1.0 mm)	17	11	14	6	3	1	1	1	4	8	14	18	98
Average relative humidity (%)	79.1	76.3	79.2	74.8	70.5	66.4	60.0	51.3	53.1	61.6	75.2	79.9	69.0
Source: Instituto Nacional de Meteorologia

== See also ==
- List of municipalities in Minas Gerais
- Major Porto, a district of Patos de Minas
