= List of movable Western Christian observances =

Religious events and holidays

This is a list of movable observances within Western Christianity. It includes secular observances which are calculated by religious observances.

This list does not necessarily imply either official status nor general observance.

== Movable Christian observances, 2021 ==
=== January ===
First Sunday of the year, unless the Sunday falls on January 1, 6, or 7, then January 2: January 5

- Feast of the Holy Name of Jesus (Roman Catholicism, according to the General Roman Calendar of 1960)

First Monday: January 6

- Handsel Monday (Scotland and Northern England)

Monday after January 6: January 12

- Baptism of the Lord – (Western Christianity in countries where Epiphany is celebrated on January 7 or 8)

Sunday following January 6: January 12

- Baptism of the Lord (Roman Catholicism, Anglicanism, Lutheranism, in countries where Epiphany is celebrated on January 7 or 8)
- Plough Sunday (England)

Day after Plough Sunday: January 13

- Plough Monday (England)

Third Sunday: January 19

- Feast of the Santo Niño (Philippines) - was cancelled in 2021, due to the COVID-19 pandemic,

=== February ===
9th Sunday before Easter in Western Christianity: February 9

- Septuagesima Sunday

2nd Sunday before Ash Wednesday (Western Christianity): February 16

- Sexagesima

Last Thursday before Lent (Western Christianity): February 20

- Fat Thursday

Saturday before Ash Wednesday: February 22

- Festum Ovorum (University of Oxford)

Sunday before Ash Wednesday (Western Christianity): February 23

- Quinquagesima

Monday before Ash Wednesday: February 24

- Shrove Monday
  - Fastelavn (Denmark/Norway)
  - Nickanan Night (Cornwall)
  - Rosenmontag (Germany)

Tuesday before Ash Wednesday: February 25

- Shrove Tuesday
  - Fastnacht (Pennsylvania Dutch)
  - Feast of the Holy Winding Sheet of Christ
  - Fettisdagen (Sweden)
  - Laskiainen (Finland, Finnish-Americans)
  - Mardi Gras
  - National Pancake Day (Netherlands)
  - Powder Day (Tolox, Spain)
  - Užgavėnės (Lithuania)

46 days before Easter: February 26

- Ash Wednesday/Lent
  - National No Smoking Day (Ireland)

Friday after Ash Wednesday: February 28

- Feast of the Crown of Thorns

=== March ===
First Sunday of Lent: March 1

- People's Sunday (Żabbar, Malta)
- Quadragesima Sunday

March 19, unless the 19th is a Sunday, then March 20: March 19

- Feast of Joseph of Nazareth (Western Christianity)
  - Father's Day (Spain, Portugal, Belgium, Italy, Honduras, and Bolivia)
  - Las Fallas, celebrated on the week leading to March 19. (Valencia)
  - "Return of the Swallow", annual observance of the swallows' return to Mission San Juan Capistrano in California.

Fourth Sunday of Lent, 21 days before Easter Sunday: March 22

- Laetare Sunday
- Mothering Sunday
- Pretzel Sunday (Luxembourg)

Fifth Sunday of Lent: March 29

- Passion Sunday (celebrated in the extraordinary form of the Roman Rite according to the General Roman Calendar of 1960)

=== April ===
Week before Easter:

- Holy Week
  - Palm Sunday: April 5
  - Holy Monday: April 6
  - Holy Tuesday: April 7
  - Holy Wednesday: April 8
  - Maundy Thursday: April 9
  - Good Friday: April 10

Second Friday of April: April 10

- Fast and Prayer Day (Liberia)
  - Holy Saturday: April 11

Easter Week: April 12-18

- Easter: April 12 (Eastertide begins)
  - Aberri Eguna (Basque)
  - Lieldienas (Latvia)
- Easter Monday: April 13
  - Family Day (South Africa)
  - Śmigus-Dyngus, regional variant of Easter Monday (Poland, Ukraine)
- Easter Tuesday: April 14(Public holiday in Tasmania)
- Easter Wednesday: April 15
  - Saint Gregory's Day (Żejtun, Malta)
- Easter Thursday: April 16
- Easter Friday: April 17
- Easter Saturday: April 18

Sunday after Easter: April 19

- Divine Mercy Sunday

=== May ===
Third Sunday after Easter: May 3

- Jubilate Sunday

Monday and Tuesday in the week following the third Sunday of Easter: May 4–5

- Hocktide (England)

Fourth Sunday after Easter: May 10

- Cantate Sunday
- Good Shepherd Sunday

Fourth Friday after Easter: May 15

- Store Bededag (Denmark)

Third Sunday of May:

- Feast of Our Lady of the Audience

Sunday preceding the Rogation days: May 17

- Rogation Sunday

Monday, Tuesday, and Wednesday preceding Feast of the Ascension: May 18–20

- Minor Rogation days

39 days after Easter: May 21

- Feast of the Ascension
  - Father's Day (Germany)
  - Festa della Sensa (Venice)
  - Global Day of Prayer
  - Sheep Festival (Cameroon)

Seventh Sunday/49 days after Easter: May 31

- Pentecost begins
  - Whitsun

=== June ===
Day after Whitsun: June 1

- Whit Monday
  - Memorial of the Blessed Virgin Mary, Mother of the Church
  - Azores Day (Portugal)

Day after Whit Monday: June 2

- Whit Tuesday

First Thursday after start of Pentecost: June 4
Friday of the week of Whitsun: June 5

- Whit Friday (North West England)

First Sunday after Pentecost: June 7

- Trinity Sunday

Thursday after Trinity Sunday; 60 days after Easter, or the Sunday immediately following this: June 11

- Corpus Christi (feast):

First Thursday after Corpus Christi: June 12

- Lajkonik (Kraków, Poland)

19 days after Pentecost: June 18

- Feast of the Sacred Heart

Sunday nearest to June 29: June 28

- Petertide (Anglican)

=== July ===
Second Sunday in July: July 12

- Sea Sunday

Last Sunday in July: July 26

- Reek Sunday (Ireland)

=== August ===
Third Weekend: August 15-16

- Festa do Rosário (Córrego Danta, Brazil)

=== September ===
Thursday following the first Sunday: September 6

- Jeûne genevois (Canton of Geneva, Switzerland)

First Sunday after September 4: September 6

- Start of Wakes Week (Parts of England and Scotland)
  - Abbots Bromley Horn Dance (Abbots Bromley, Staffordshire, England)

Weekend after first Monday: September 7

- Feast of Sts Cosmas and Damian (Italian-American)

Second Sunday: September 13

- Education Sunday (British Churches)
- Racial Justice Sunday (British Churches)

Third Sunday: September 20

- Federal Day of Thanksgiving, Repentance and Prayer (Switzerland)

Monday after third Sunday: September 20

- Lundi du Jeûne (Vaud, Switzerland)

=== October ===
First Sunday: October 4

- Day of Prayer for the Peace of Jerusalem (Pentecostal Christianity)
- World Communion Sunday

Second Sunday: October 11

- White Sunday (Tonga, Samoa)

Last Sunday: October 25

- Feast of Christ the King (Tridentine Mass Catholics)

=== November ===
Saturday between October 31 – November 6:

- All Saints' Day (Finland and Sweden only)

Second Sunday before Advent: November 8

- Volkstrauertag (Germany)

Second Wednesday before the First Sunday in Advent: November 11

- Buß- und Bettag (Saxony, Germany, Lutheran, Reformed (Calvinist) and United denominations)

Sunday nearest November 11: November 14

- Remembrance Sunday (United Kingdom and certain Commonwealth countries)

Last Sunday before First Advent Sunday: November 22

- Feast of Christ the King (Roman Catholic)
- Stir-up Sunday (Anglican Church)
- Totensonntag (mainly Lutheran)
- World Youth Day (Next International-level World Youth Day will be in August 2023 Roman Catholicism)

Fourth Sunday before Christmas Day: November 29

- Advent Sunday (start of Advent, Western Christianity)

=== December ===
First Friday: December 4

- Gospel Day (Marshall Islands)

First Sunday: December 6

- First Presidency's Christmas Devotional (The Church of Jesus Christ of Latter-day Saints)

Seven days, starting on First Monday: December 7-13

- Chalica (Unitarian Universalism)

Sunday two weeks before Christmas: December 13

- Detinjci (Serbia)

Second-final Sunday before Christmas Day: December 13

- Gaudete Sunday (Western Christianity)

Thursday of the last full week before Christmas: December 17

- Chewidden Thursday (Cornwall)
- National Regifting Day (United States)

Last Friday before Christmas: December 18

- Black Friday (partying) (secular, United Kingdom)

Last Saturday before Christmas: December 19

- Super Saturday (secular, United States)

Sunday before Christmas: December 20

- Christmas Sunday
- Honesty Day (Italy)

Winter Solstice: December 21

- Blue Christmas (holiday)

The Sunday between Christmas Day and New Year's Day (both exclusive), or December 30 if both Christmas Day and the Solemnity of Mary, Mother of God are Sundays: December 27

- Feast of the Holy Family (Roman Catholicism)

== See also ==
- List of movable Eastern Christian observances
