= Immediate Geographic Region of Araxá =

Urban administrative region in Minas Gerais, Brazil

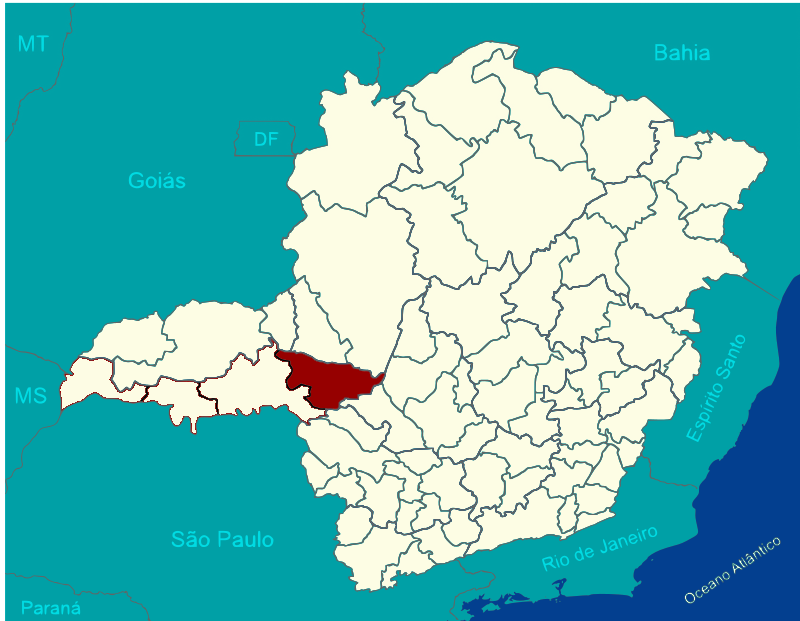
Immediate Geographic Region of Araxá, in the state of Minas Gerais, Brazil.

The Immediate Geographic Region of Araxá is one of the 4 immediate geographic regions in the Intermediate Geographic Region of Uberaba, one of the 70 immediate geographic regions in the Brazilian state of Minas Gerais and one of the 509 of Brazil, created by the National Institute of Geography and Statistics (IBGE) in 2017.

== Municipalities ==
It comprises 8 municipalities.

- Araxá
- Campos Altos
- Ibiá
- Pedrinópolis
- Perdizes
- Pratinha
- Santa Rosa da Serra
- Tapira

== See also ==
- List of Intermediate and Immediate Geographic Regions of Minas Gerais
