= Guaxupé =

Brazilian municipality located in the southwest of the state of Minas Gerais

Coordinates: 21°18′18″S 46°42′46″W

- Municipality
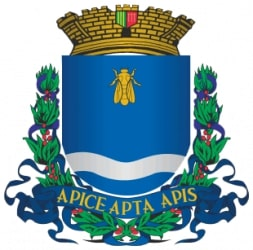
- Coat of arms
- Interactive map of Guaxupé
- Country: Brazil
- State: Minas Gerais
- Region: Southeast
- Time zone: UTC−3 (BRT)

Location of Guaxupé on a map of the state of Minas Gerais

Guaxupé is a Brazilian municipality located in the southwest of the state of Minas Gerais. Its estimated population in 2020 was 52,078 inhabitants living in a total area of 286 km^{2}. The city belongs to the meso-region of Sul e Sudoeste de Minas and to the micro-region of São Sebastião do Paraíso. It became a municipality in 1837.

== Geography ==
The city center of Guaxupé is located at an elevation of 760 meters a short distance from the state boundary of São Paulo. Neighboring municipalities are: Pratinha and São Pedro da União (N), Juruaia and Muzambinho (E), Tapiratiba (S), and Guaranésia (W).

Access and Distances

- BR 491(Rodovia do Café) – MG 450 – MG 169 – SP 350
- Main distances

Belo Horizonte: 478 km, São Paulo: 282 km, Rio de Janeiro: 650 km, Brasília: 1200 km, Campinas: 200 km, Ribeirão Preto: 150 km, Poços de Caldas: 100 km, and Alfenas: 100 km

== Economic activities ==
Agriculture, with coffee production and dairy products, is the main economic activity. Industry is also important with four major factories: Fiação e Tecelagem Guaxupé, belonging to the Kanebo group; PEMG and TECTER (electro-magnetic); Pasqua J.F. and Qualifio (copper wires). there are also about 150 small industrial units which produce dairy products, sweets, wood products, cement blocks, shoes, ammunition, surgical stitches, clothes, furniture, and coffee toasting.

The GDP in 2005 was approximately R$732 million, with 80 million reais from taxes, 351 million reais from services, 265 million reais from industry, and 36 million reais from agriculture. The industrial sector employed 3,038 workers in 2005, while 3,667 were employed in commerce, and 774 were employed in public administration.

In the rural area there were 398 producers on 19,000 hectares of land. Approximately 2100 persons were occupied in agriculture. The main crops are coffee, 6,200 hectares; sugarcane, 1,275 hectares; and corn, 1,300 hectares. There were 8,000 head of cattle, of which 3,000 were milk cows (2006). Swine and poultry raising are also substantial.

There were 7 banks (2007). In the vehicle fleet there were 11,233 automobiles, 757 trucks, 1,082 pickup trucks, 137 buses, and 3,286 motorcycles (2007).

== Health and education ==
In the health sector there were 13 health clinics and 1 private hospital with 100 beds (2005). Educational needs of 11,100 students were attended to by 38 primary schools, 5 middle schools, and 18 pre-primary schools.

- Municipal Human Development Index: 0.796 (2000)
- State ranking: 53 out of 853 municipalities as of 2000
- National ranking: 639 out of 5,138 municipalities as of 2000
- Literacy rate: 90%
- Life expectancy: 73 (average of males and females)

In 2000 the per capita monthly income of R$301.00 was above the state average of R$276.00 and above the national average of R$297.00. Poços de Caldas had the highest per capita monthly income in 2000 with R$435.00. The lowest was Setubinha with R$73.00.

The highest ranking municipality in Minas Gerais in 2000 was Poços de Caldas with 0.841, while the lowest was Setubinha with 0.568. Nationally the highest was São Caetano do Sul in São Paulo with 0.919, while the lowest was Setubinha. In more recent statistics (considering 5,507 municipalities) Manari in the state of Pernambuco has the lowest rating in the country—0,467—putting it in last place.

== Historical heritage ==
- Palácio das Águias – The Eagles Palace was inventoried in 2007 by the CDMPHC.;
- Prédio da Academia de Comércio São José – Property still listed by the Municipal Decree no. 1,010, of March 20, 2002;
- Antiga Loja Jacob Miguel Sabbag e Cia Ltda - (current Guaxupé Farm Administration Agency- SEF / MG) – Real estate listed by Municipal Decree no. 1,007, of March 20, 2002;
- Antiga Cadeia Pública Estadual – Former State Public Jail – Property still listed by the Municipal Decree no. 973, April 4, 2001;
- Antiga Câmara Municipal – Old Town Hall (current Comendador Sebastião de Sá Historical and Geographic Museum) – Real estate listed by Municipal Decree no. 974, April 4, 2001;
- Conjunto Arquitetônico e Paisagístico da Antiga Estação Ferroviária de Guaxupé - Architectural and Scenic Set of the Old Guaxupé Railway Station (FEPASA / Mogiana Municipal Park) – Real estate property listed by Municipal Decree no. 856 of July 29, 1998;
- Palácio da Justiça – Palace of justice (former Forum of the District and current City Hall of Guaxupé) – Real estate listed by the Municipal Decree no. 972, April 4, 2001;
- Antigo Hotel Cobra – (current Arlete Souza Mendes Municipal Theater) – Real estate property listed by Municipal Decree no. 975 of April 4, 2001;
- Antiga Agência do Banco do Brasil - Former Bank of Brazil Branch (current City Hall) – Real estate listed by the Municipal Decree no. 860 of September 29, 1998;
- Herma Cel. Antônio Costa Monteiro – Property still listed by the Municipal Decree no. 1,009, of March 20, 2002;
- Monumento ao Trabalhador Rural – O “Nicanor” – Rural Worker Monument – The “Nicanor” – Immovable property listed by Municipal Decree no. 1,009, of March 20, 2002;
- Obelisco em Homenagem ao Expedicionário Guaxupeano da FEB – Obelisk Honoring FEB Guaxupean Expeditionary – Property still listed by the Municipal Decree no. 1,006, of March 20, 2002;
- Catedral de Nossa Senhora das Dores – Property still listed by the Municipal Decree no. 1,522, of September 4, 2012;
- Casa de Pau-a-pique (antiga sede da Fazenda Bom Jardim dos Machados) – Pau-a-pique House (former headquarters of the Bom Jardim dos Machados Farm) - Property still listed by the Municipal Decree no. 1272, of December 08, 2008;
- Taça de 1928 – “PRIMEIRO JOGO INTERNACIONAL REALIZADO EM MINAS” – 1928 Cup – “FIRST INTERNATIONAL GAME HELD IN MINAS” – Mobile well overturned by Municipal Decree no. 855 of July 29, 1998;
- Imaginária de São Miguel Arcanjo – Property overturned by Municipal Decree no. 1,521, of September 4, 2012;

== See also ==
- List of municipalities in Minas Gerais
