= O Cabeleira =

O Cabeleira (English: Cabeleira) is an 1876 novel by Brazilian Romantic author Franklin Távora. Set in Pernambuco, during the 18th century, the novel tells the story of the cangaceiro José Gomes (a.k.a. "Cabeleira") and his father Joaquim, and their adventures at the sertão of the Brazilian Northeast.

== Adaptations ==
The book was adapted into a homonymous film in 1963. Starring Hélio Souto, Milton Ribeiro and Marlene França, its filming took place in the cities of Mococa (São Paulo) and Arceburgo (Minas Gerais).

In 2008, the book was adapted into comics, by Hiroshi Maeda and Leandro Assis.
