= Guaranésia =

Brazilian municipality located in the southwest of the state of Minas Gerais

Coordinates: 21°17′56″S 46°48′10″W

- Municipality
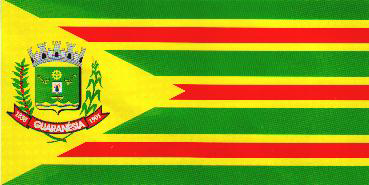
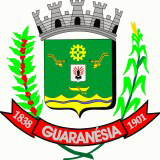
- Flag Coat of arms
- Interactive map of Guaranésia
- Country: Brazil
- State: Minas Gerais
- Region: Southeast
- Time zone: UTC−3 (BRT)

Location of Guaranésia on a map of the state of Minas Gerais

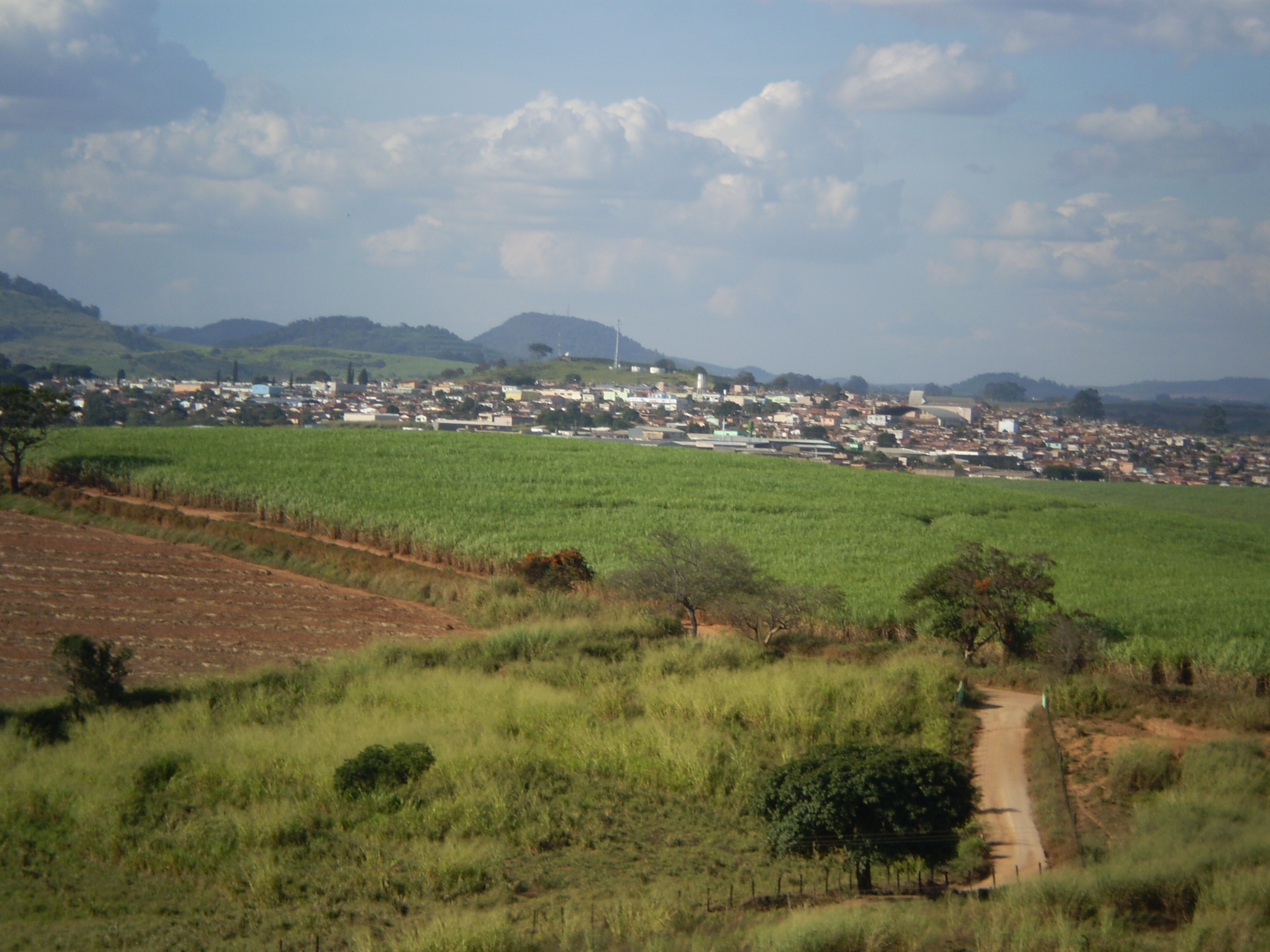
Guaranesia landscape

Guaranésia is a Brazilian municipality located in the southwest of the state of Minas Gerais. Its population as of 2022 was 19,150 people living in a total area of 294 km^{2}. The city belongs to the meso-region of Sul e Sudoeste de Minas and to the micro-region of São Sebastião do Paraíso. It became a municipality in 1901. The municipality is an important producer of coffee.

== Geography ==
The city center of Guaranésia is located at an elevation of 751 meters above sea level, a short distance from the state boundary of São Paulo, between Guaxupé and Arceburgo. Neighboring municipalities are: São Pedro da União (NE), Guaxupé (E) Mococa (S), Arceburgo (W) and Monte Santo de Minas (NW)

- Main distances

Belo Horizonte: 465 km, Arceburgo: 15 km, Guaxupé: 13 km, and São Sebastião do Paraíso: 70 km.

== Economic activities ==
Agriculture, with coffee production and dairy products, is the main economic activity. The GDP in 2005 was approximately R$176 million, with 18 million reais from taxes, 73 million reais from services, 54 million reais from industry, and 32 million reais from agriculture. The industrial sector employed 1,655 workers in 2005, while 878 were employed in commerce, and 507 were employed in public administration.

In the rural area there were 487 producers on 17,000 hectares of land. Approximately 3,200 persons were occupied in agriculture. The main crops are coffee, 4,520 hectares; sugarcane, 2,550 hectares; and corn, 1,100 hectares (2006). There were 15,000 head of cattle, of which 6,000 were milk cows (2006). Swine and poultry raising are also important in the local economy.

There was one bank (2007). In the vehicle fleet there were 3,666 automobiles, 321 trucks, 307 pickup trucks, 68 buses, and 1,167 motorcycles (2007).

== Health and education ==
In the health sector there were 7 health clinics and one private hospital with 55 beds (2005). Educational needs of 5,400 students were attended to by 11 primary schools, 1 middle school, and 11 pre-primary schools.

- Municipal Human Development Index: 0.769 (2000)
- State ranking: 176 out of 853 municipalities as of 2000
- National ranking: 1,365 out of 5,138 municipalities as of 2000
- Literacy rate: 86%
- Life expectancy: 72 (average of males and females)

In 2000 the per capita monthly income of R$267.00 was below the state average of R$276.00 and below the national average of R$297.00. Poços de Caldas had the highest per capita monthly income in Minas Gerais 2000 with R$435.00. The lowest in the state was Setubinha with R$73.00 a month.

The highest ranking municipality in Minas Gerais in 2000 was Poços de Caldas with 0.841, while the lowest was Setubinha with 0.568. Nationally the highest was São Caetano do Sul in São Paulo with 0.919, while the lowest was Setubinha. In more recent statistics (considering 5,507 municipalities) Manari in the state of Pernambuco has the lowest rating in the country—0,467—putting it in last place.

== See also ==
- List of municipalities in Minas Gerais
