= Tapiraí =

Tapiraí refers to the following places in the Brazil:

- Tapiraí, Minas Gerais
- Tapiraí, São Paulo
