= Arceburgo =

Municipality in Minas Gerais, Brazil

Coordinates: 21°21′50″S 46°56′24″W

- Municipality
- Flag Coat of arms
- Interactive map of Arceburgo
- Country: Brazil
- State: Minas Gerais
- Region: Southeast
- Time zone: UTC−3 (BRT)

Location of Arceburgo on a map of the state of Minas Gerais

Arceburgo is a municipality in the state of Minas Gerais, Brazil. Its population as of 2020 was 10,883 people living in a total area of 162 km^{2}. The city belongs to the meso-region of Sul e Sudoeste de Minas and to the micro-region of São Sebastião do Paraíso. It became a municipality in 1893.

== Geography ==
The city center of Arceburgo is located at an elevation of 693 meters a short distance from the state boundary of São Paulo. Neighboring municipalities are: Monte Santo de Minas (N and NW), Guaranésia (E), Mococa (SE).

== History ==
This town began in 1901, with the building of a chapel to honor Saint John the Baptist, on land donated by Candido Souza Dias the owner of the Fazenda Fortaleza. Formerly called "São João da Fortaleza", this settlement received many European immigrants, mainly Syrians, Lebanese, and Italians. Two traditional families in the region are the Maffud and the Salim João. The name of Arceburgo, meaning strong city, was given in 1911.

- Main distances

Belo Horizonte: 478 km, Mococa: 18 km, Guaranésia: 20 km, and Guaxupé: 27 km.

== Economic activities ==
Agriculture, with coffee production and dairy products, is the main economic activity. The GDP in 2005 was approximately R$90 million, with 9 million reais from taxes, 34 million reais from services, 33 million reais from industry, and 13 million reais from agriculture. The industrial sector employed 710 workers in 2005, while 364 were employed in commerce, and 313 were employed in public administration.

In the rural area there were 317 producers on 22,000 hectares of land. Approximately 1,700 persons were occupied in agriculture. The main crops are coffee, 1,500 hectares; sugarcane, 1,340 hectares; and corn, 800 hectares. There were 14,000 head of cattle, of which 4,500 were milk cows (2006). Swine and poultry raising are also important in the local economy.

There was one bank (2007). In the vehicle fleet there were 1,219 automobiles, 83 trucks, 136 pickup trucks, 29 buses, and 461 motorcycles (2007).

== Health and education ==
In the health sector there were 5 health clinics (2005). Educational needs of 2,000 students were attended to by 4 primary schools, 1 middle school, and 2 pre-primary schools.

- Municipal Human Development Index: 0.746 (2000)
- State ranking: 317 out of 853 municipalities as of 2000
- National ranking: 2,001 out of 5,138 municipalities as of 2000
- Literacy rate: 86%
- Life expectancy: 68 (average of males and females)

In 2000 the per capita monthly income of R$230.00 was below the state average of R$276.00 and below the national average of R$297.00. Poços de Caldas had the highest per capita monthly income in 2000 with R$435.00. The lowest was Setubinha with R$73.00.

The highest ranking municipality in Minas Gerais in 2000 was Poços de Caldas with 0.841, while the lowest was Setubinha with 0.568. Nationally the highest was São Caetano do Sul in São Paulo with 0.919, while the lowest was Setubinha. In more recent statistics (considering 5,507 municipalities) Manari in the state of Pernambuco has the lowest rating in the country—0,467—putting it in last place.

== See also ==
- List of municipalities in Minas Gerais
