= Santa Rosa da Serra =

- Municipality
- Municipality of Santa Rosa da Serra
- Location of Santa Rosa da Serra

- Location in Brazil
- Coordinates: 19°31′48″S 46°57′57″W
- Country: Brazil
- Region: Southeast
- State: Minas Gerais

Santa Rosa da Serra is a Brazilian municipality located in the northwest of the state of Minas Gerais. Its population as of 2020 was 3,357 people living in a total area of 296 km^{2}. The city belongs to the mesoregion of Triângulo Mineiro e Alto Paranaiba and to the microregion of Patos de Minas. It became a municipality in 1962.

== Geography ==
The urban center is located at an elevation of 1,040 meters southeast of Patos de Minas in the upper Indaiá River valley. Neighboring municipalities are: São Gotardo (N), Estrela do Indaiá (E), Córrego Danta (S), and Campos Altos (W).

=== Distances ===
- Araxá: 135 km
- Estalagem: 35 km (BR-262)
- Belo Horizonte: 230 km

== Economic activities ==
The most important economic activities are cattle raising, commerce, and agriculture. The GDP in 2005 was R$28 million, with 10 million generated by services, 1 million generated by industry, and 16 million generated by agriculture. Santa Rosa da Serra is in the middle tier of municipalities in the state with regard to economic and social development. As of 2007 there were no banking agencies in the town. There was a modest retail infrastructure serving the surrounding area of cattle and agricultural lands. There were 325 automobiles in all of the municipality (2007), about one for every 10 inhabitants.

Santa Rosa da Serra has a small municipal area and therefore little available land for agriculture. In the rural area there were 494 establishments (2006) occupying 25,000 hectares (planted area—2,000 ha, and natural pasture—16,500 ha.). About 2,000 persons were dependent on agriculture. 62 of the farms had tractors, a ratio of one in 8 farms. There were 9,700 head of cattle in 2006. The main crops were:

- coffee: 2,000 hectares
- corn: 1,500 hectares

== Health and education ==
In the health sector there were 3 health clinics and no hospitals. In the educational sector there were 2 pre-primary schools, 3 primary schools, and no middle schools.

- Municipal Human Development Index: 0.745 (2000)
- State ranking: 329 out of 853 municipalities as of 2000
- National ranking: 2,037 out of 5,138 municipalities as of 2000
- Literacy rate: 82%
- Life expectancy: 72 (average of males and females)

The highest-ranking municipality in Minas Gerais in 2000 was Poços de Caldas with 0.841, while the lowest was Setubinha with 0.568. Nationally the highest was São Caetano do Sul in São Paulo with 0.919, while the lowest was Setubinha. In more recent statistics (considering 5,507 municipalities) Manari in the state of Pernambuco has the lowest rating in the country—0,467—putting it in last place.

== See also ==
- List of municipalities in Minas Gerais
