= Ibiá =

Town and municipality in the state of Minas Gerais, Brazil

Coordinates: 19°28′40″S 46°32′20″W

- Municipality
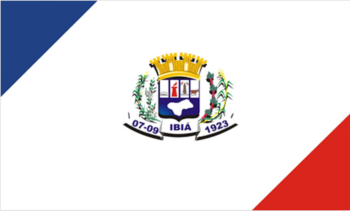
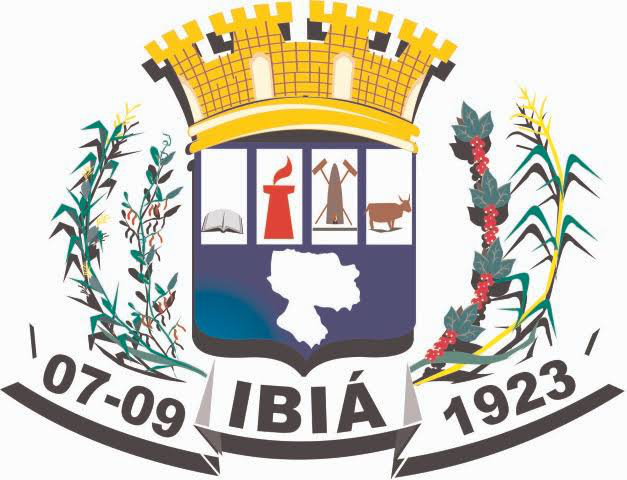
- Flag Coat of arms
- Interactive map of Ibiá
- Country: Brazil
- State: Minas Gerais
- Region: Southeast
- Time zone: UTC−3 (BRT)

Location of Ibiá

Ibiá is a Brazilian municipality located in the west of the state of Minas Gerais. Its population as of 2020 was estimated to be 25,358 people living in a total area of 2,707 km^{2} (1,045 sq mi). The city belongs to the mesoregion of Triângulo Mineiro and Alto Paranaíba and to the micro-region of Araxá. It became a municipality in 1923.

== Geography ==
Ibiá is located at an elevation of 895 meters, 55 km. east of Araxá just north of highway BR-262. The distance to the state capital, Belo Horizonte, is 324 km. Neighboring municipalities are: Serra do Salitre and Rio Paranaíba (N), Campos Altos (E), Pratinha and Medeiros (SE), Tapira (S) and Araxá (W).

Ibiá is an important railroad junction and its history is tied to the railroad. The Ferrovia da Centro Atlântica, a railroad line used for cargo, passes through the town and divides into the Ibiá-Patrocínio-Brasília line and the Ibiá-Araxá-Uberaba-São Paulo line.

== Meaning of the name ==
"Ibiá" is an indigenous name meaning "High Plateaus", due to the geographical location of the town.

== Economic activities ==
The GDP in 2005 was approximately R$426 million, with 129 million reais from services, 126 million reais from industry, and 141 million reais from agriculture. Ibiá ranks in the top positions nationally in milk production. In 2005 it was in first place with 104 million liters a year. There were 528 rural producers on 127,000 hectares of land. The land is very fertile and agricultural production is high. 195 farms had tractors (2006). Approximately 2,800 persons were dependent on agriculture. The main crops are coffee (3,500 hectares planted in 2006)) and sugarcane (2,500 hectares planted in 2006), while avocado, soybeans, potatoes, wheat, and corn were also grown. There were 121,000 head of cattle (2006).

There were 4 banks (2007) and 3,523 automobiles (2007), giving a ratio of 6 inhabitants per automobile.

Working population (IBGE 2003)

- Agriculture: 3,268
- Industry; 1,289
- Commerce of merchandise: 1,284
- Services: 3,103

== Health and education ==
In the health sector there were 16 public health clinics and 1 hospital with 33 beds (2005). Patients with more serious health conditions are transported to Araxá, which is connected by good roads. Educational needs were met by 20 primary schools, 4 middle school, and 19 pre-primary schools.

- Municipal Human Development Index: 0.797 (2000)
- State ranking: 48 out of 853 municipalities as of 2000
- National ranking: 625 out of 5,138 municipalities as of 2000
- Literacy rate: 90%
- Life expectancy: 72 (average of males and females)

In 2000 the per capita monthly income of R$385.00 was above the state and national average of R$276.00 and R$297.00 respectively.

The highest ranking municipality in Minas Gerais in 2000 was Poços de Caldas with 0.841, while the lowest was Setubinha with 0.568. Nationally the highest was São Caetano do Sul in São Paulo with 0.919, while the lowest was Setubinha. In more recent statistics (considering 5,507 municipalities) Manari in the state of Pernambuco has the lowest rating in the country—0,467—putting it in last place.

== See also ==
- List of municipalities in Minas Gerais
