= Picrous Day =

An illustration of the Picrous Day story "Piskies in the cellar"

Picrous Day was a festival celebrated by the tin miners of Cornwall on the First Thursday before Christmas. The Day commemorated the putative discovery of tin by a man named Picrous, whom miners in the East of Cornwall celebrated as the founder of tin mining instead of St Piran.

Robert Hunt in his Popular Romances of the West of England states:

The second Thursday before Christmas-day is a festival observed by the tinners of the district of Blackmore, and known as Picrous day. It is not at present marked by any distinctive ceremonies, but it is the occasion of a supper and much merry-making. The owner of the tin-stream contributes a shilling a man towards it. This is said to be the feast of the discovery of tin by a man named Picrous. My first impression was that the day took its name from the circumstance of a pie forming the pièce de résistance of the supper; but this explanation is not allowed by tinners, nor sanctioned by the usages of the feast. What truth there may be in the tradition of the first tinner, Picrous, it is now too late to discover, but the notion is worth recording. It has occurred to me whether, from some similarity between the names (not a close one, I admit it), the honours of Picrous may not have been transferred to St Piran, who is generally said to be the patron saint of tinners. St Piran is not known in Blackmore, and his festival is on the 5th of March. The tinners also have a festival to commemorate the discovery of smelting

Picrous Day is believed to have been especially popular in Luxulyan where celebratory feasts were held at the Rising Sun Inn.

== See also ==
- Chewidden Thursday
- Tom Bawcock's Eve
- Nickanan Night
- St Piran's Day
