= Campos Altos =

Municipality in Southeast, Brazil

Coordinates: 19°41′45″S 46°10′15″W

- Municipality
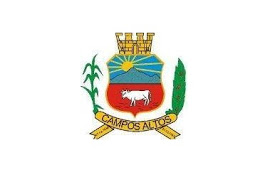
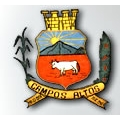
- Flag Coat of arms
- Interactive map of Campos Altos
- Country: Brazil
- State: Minas Gerais
- Region: Southeast
- Time zone: UTC−3 (BRT)

Location of Campos Altos

Campos Altos is a Brazilian municipality located in the west of the state of Minas Gerais. Its population as of 2020 was estimated to be 15,563 people living in a total area of 719 km^{2} (278 sq mi). The city belongs to the mesoregion of Triângulo Mineiro and Alto Paranaíba and to the micro-region of Araxá. It became a municipality in 1944.

Campos Altos is located at an elevation of 1,050 m (3,440 ft), 85 km (53 mi) east of Araxá on highway BR-216. The distance to the state capital, Belo Horizonte, is 264 km (164 mi). Neighboring municipalities are: Rio Paranaíba (N), São Gotardo (NE), Santa Rosa da Serra (E), Córrego Danta, (SE) Tapiraí (S), Pratinha (SW), and Ibiá (W).

The Ferrovia da Centro Atlântica, a railroad line used for cargo, passes through the town.

The GDP in 2005 was approximately R$133 million, with 53 million reais from services, 4 million reais from industry, and 69 million reais from agriculture. There were 549 rural producers on 48,000 hectares (120,000 acres) of land. The land is very fertile and agricultural production is high. 168 farms had tractors in 2006. Approximately 2,000 persons were dependent on agriculture. The main crop is coffee (8,500 hectares (21,000 acres) planted in 2006), while soybeans, potatoes, wheat, and corn are also grown. There were 25,000 head of cattle in 2006. As of 2007, there were 2 banks: Banco Itaú, Banco do Brasil and Sicoob/Crediagro. There were 1,988 automobiles in 2007, giving a ratio of 6 inhabitants per automobile.

There were 8 health clinics and 1 hospital with 37 beds in 2005. Patients with more serious health conditions are transported to Araxá, which is connected by good roads. Educational needs are met by 3 primary schools, 1 middle school, and 6 pre-primary schools.

- Municipal Human Development Index: 0.786 (2000)
- State ranking: 90 out of 853 municipalities as of 2000
- National ranking: 901 out of 5,138 municipalities as of 2000
- Literacy rate: 87%
- Life expectancy: 74 (average of males and females)

In 2000, the per capita monthly income of R$251.00 was below the state and national average of R$276.00 and R$297.00 respectively.

The highest ranking municipality in Minas Gerais in 2000 was Poços de Caldas with 0.841, while the lowest was Setubinha with 0.568. Nationally the highest was São Caetano do Sul in São Paulo with 0.919, while the lowest was Setubinha. In more recent statistics (considering 5,507 municipalities), Manari in the state of Pernambuco has the lowest rating in the country, at 0.467, putting it in last place.

== See also ==
- List of municipalities in Minas Gerais
