= Pratinha =

Town and municipality in the state of Minas Gerais, Brazil

Coordinates: 19°45′03″S 46°22′40″W

- Municipality
- Coat of arms
- Interactive map of Pratinha
- Country: Brazil
- State: Minas Gerais
- Region: Southeast
- Time zone: UTC−3 (BRT)

Location of Pratinha

Pratinha is a Brazilian municipality located in the west of the state of Minas Gerais. Its population as of 2020 was 3,631 people living in a total area of 619 km^{2} (239 sq mi). The city belongs to the meso-region of Triângulo Mineiro and Alto Paranaíba and to the micro-region of Araxá. It became a municipality in 1949.

== Geography ==
Pratinha is located at an elevation of 1,162 (city center) meters, east of Uberaba. Neighboring municipalities are: Ibiá (N), Campos Altos (E), Medeiros (SE), Tapira (SW), Araxá (W).

=== Communications and distances ===
Pratinha is connected to both Araxá and Uberlândia by national highway BR-462, which lies 19 km. on MG-796 to the north. The distance to Araxá is 78 kilometers; Campos Altos is 29 km to the northeast; Medeiros is 27 km to the southeast; Uberaba is 200 km to the west. The distance to the state capital, Belo Horizonte, is 350 km.

=== Climate ===
Pratinha is one of the highest municipalities in Brazil. The climate is predominantly tropical with rains in the summer and dry winters. The average annual rainfall is 1,574.7mm. The average annual temperature is 20.4°C, with an average maximum of 26.5°C and an average minimum of 15.7°C.

== Economic activities ==
The GDP in 2005 was approximately R$33 million, with 1 million reais from taxes, 10 million reais from services, 1 million reais from industry, and 20 million reais from agriculture. There were 554 rural producers on 44,000 hectares of land. The high elevation means the land is suitable for coffee growing. 117 farms had tractors (2006). Approximately 1,400 persons were dependent on agriculture. The main crops are coffee, rice, soybeans, beans, and corn. There were 22,000 head of cattle (2006), most of which were raised for milk and cheese production.

There were no banks (2007) and 551 automobiles (2007), giving a ratio of 6 inhabitants per automobile.

== Health and education ==
In the health sector there was 1 public health clinic (2005). Patients with more serious health conditions are transported to Araxá or to Uberlândia, which are connected by good roads. Educational needs were met by 3 primary schools, 1 middle school, and 1 pre-primary school.

- Municipal Human Development Index: 0.774 (2000)
- State ranking: 146 out of 853 municipalities as of 2000
- National ranking: 1,229 out of 5,138 municipalities as of 2000
- Literacy rate: 84%
- Life expectancy: 74 (average of males and females)

In 2000 the per capita monthly income of R$246.00 was just below the state and national average of R$276.00 and R$297.00 respectively.

The highest ranking municipality in Minas Gerais in 2000 was Poços de Caldas with 0.841, while the lowest was Setubinha with 0.568. Nationally the highest was São Caetano do Sul in São Paulo with 0.919, while the lowest was Setubinha. In more recent statistics (considering 5,507 municipalities) Manari in the state of Pernambuco has the lowest rating in the country—0,467—putting it in last place.

== See also ==
- List of municipalities in Minas Gerais
