= Door-knocking prank =

Prank game

a depiction of the prank

A door-knocking prank, colloquially known as knock down ginger; ding dong ditch; Chappy; and knock a door run amongst other names, is a prank or game that dates back to the traditional Cornish holiday of Nickanan Night where it was originally called Nicky Nicky nine doors in the 19th-century or possibly earlier. The game is played by children in a lot of cultures. It involves knocking on the front door (or ringing the doorbell) of a victim, then running away before the door can be answered. The only names listed in the Historical Thesaurus of English are runaway knock (attested 1813) and runaway ring (1790). "Runaway Knock" is the title of paintings depicting instances of the prank by George Cruikshank (1855) and Stanhope Forbes (1888).

== Name variations ==
The game in various forms is known by different names geographically, including the following:

=== Europe ===
- Belletje-trek (lit. transl. bell pull; Flanders, Belgium, Netherlands)
- Bobby knocking (Wales)
- Chickenelly, Chappy, Chappies, Chicky melly Chap-door-run (Scotland)
- Cherry knocking (Gloucestershire, England)
- Ding dong skoosh, Ring bang scoosh (Scotland)
- Dyraat (Iceland)
- Klingelstreich (Germany)
- Knick knack (Dublin, Ireland)
- Knock and nash (United Kingdom)
- Knocky Eye Door (Cumbria, United Kingdom)
- Knock and run (England)
- Knock door run (Leicester, England, midlands)
- Knock down ginger (England)
- Knock off ginger (England)

=== North America ===
- Ding dong ditch (United States)
- Doorbell ditch (United States)
- Doorbell dixie (United States)
- Nicky Nicky Nine Doors (Canada)
- Knock-knock ginger (Canada)
- Ring and run (United States)
- Sonne-décrisse (transl. ring–fuck off; Canada)

=== Oceania ===
- Knick Knocking (Australia)
- Postman's Knock (New Zealand)

=== Africa ===
- Tok-tokkie (South Africa)

=== South America ===
- Rín-Rín-Raja (Chile)
- Tin-Tin Corre-Corre (Colombia)
- Ring-Raje (Argentina)

=== Asia ===
- Bel-Twi (벨튀, South Korea)
- Ping-Pong Dash (ピンポンダッシュ, Japan)

== Legality ==
=== United Kingdom ===
The Town Police Clauses Act 1847 made it a criminal offence in towns in England and Wales and Ireland to "wilfully and wantonly disturb any inhabitant, by pulling or ringing any door bell, or knocking at any door" punishable with up to 14 days' imprisonment. The provision was repealed for the Republic of Ireland in 2013 and for England and Wales in 2015; it remains in force in Northern Ireland.

==== England and Wales ====
The prankster can face charges of trespassing and disturbing the peace. In England and Wales, trespassing is a civil matter rather than a criminal one, and the police will not compile a case for a victim.

The repealed Metropolitan Police Act 1839 made it an offence within the London Metropolitan Police district to "wilfully and wantonly disturb any inhabitant by pulling or ringing any door-bell or knocking at any door without lawful excuse"; the maximum penalty is a level 2 fine.

==== Scotland ====
In Scotland, although the Land Reform (Scotland) Act 2003 establishes universal access rights, known colloquially as the "right to roam,” these rights are only permitted where the privacy of others is respected. Such errant behaviour could be regarded as the Scottish common law criminal offence of "malicious mischief" or under the Hate Crime and Public Order (Scotland) Act 2021, also known as the Hate Crime Act. However to be a hate crime, the “Ding Dong Ditch” act would have to have targeted the occupant because of their race, age, sex, sexual orientation, religious beliefs or other issue covered in the act.

=== Canada ===
==== Canadian Criminal Code ====
Under the Criminal Code, several offenses could potentially apply to ding-dong-ditch activities:

Mischief (Section 430(1)): Mischief includes actions that aim to damage or interfere with the legitimate enjoyment of property. If ding-dong-ditch activities damage the door or structure of a house, they could be considered as mischief. Additionally, even without direct damage, intentionally disrupting the peaceful enjoyment of a home could be interpreted as a form of mischief.

Trespassing at Night (Section 177): Although this section mainly covers unauthorized entries onto private property at night, it could apply if someone enters a yard or garden without permission during nighttime to disturb the occupants.

==== Civil Law ====
Under civil law, particularly in Quebec, the homeowner could also pursue claims for damages to their property, such as:

Civil Liability: Under Article 1457 of the Civil Code of Quebec, any person who causes harm to another must compensate for the damages. If ding-dong-ditch leads to material damages (such as a broken door, damage to the garden, or to home structures), the victim may seek compensation from the person responsible.

Neighborhood Disturbance: Civil law can also apply to repetitive nuisances. If the actions cause persistent and unusual disturbances, they could be considered a neighborhood disturbance.

== Incidents ==
=== United States ===
Around 12:30 AM on October 25, 2003, a 16-year-old boy was playing "ding dong ditch" in front of Jay Steven Levin's home in Boca Raton, Florida. Levin armed himself, went outside, and fatally shot the boy in the back as he tried to flee. Levin claimed self-defense. This incident sparked debates on the proportionality of responses to acts perceived as harmless pranks.

On 13 June 2011, Michael Bishop, a 56-year-old man, shot at a group of children playing ding dong ditch at his house in Louisville, Kentucky. A 12-year-old boy was hit in the back with a shotgun blast and was taken to Kosair Children's Hospital "with what police call non-life-threatening injuries". The shooter was charged with attempted murder. On 8 December 2015, his final day in office, outgoing Kentucky governor Steve Beshear issued 197 pardons, including a pardon for Bishop.

In Oklahoma, 14-year-old Cole Peyton was shot in the back and arm while playing "ding dong ditch" in the early hours of New Year's Day of 2016.

Dean Taylor, a 63-year-old coach and former San Francisco Police Department officer, was arrested following an incident involving an 11-year-old boy who rang his doorbell in San Rafael, California on 12 February 2021. After two boys rang his door and ran, Taylor chased the boys in a vehicle, cut off one of the youths and emerged from the car. Then he allegedly grabbed one 11-year-old boy by the neck, pushed him to the ground and forced him into his vehicle. He drove the terrified boy around the block, and allegedly told the boy that he would "put a bullet in his head" if the prank happened again. He dropped the boy off near Point San Pedro Road and Loch Lomond Drive, and police were called. Taylor faces felony charges including kidnapping, making criminal threats, false imprisonment, battery and child endangerment.

A California man, Anurag Chandra, 42, faced several murder charges for his role in a crash on Temescal Canyon Road on 24 January 2020. A group of six teenage boys drove to a nearby home on Mojeska Summit Road in Corona, about 50 miles southeast of Los Angeles, after one of them had been dared. The boy rang the doorbell and returned to the 2002 Prius that they were riding in, and the group took off. Chandra, who lives at the home, chased after them in his 2019 Infiniti Q50. His car rammed into the back of the Prius, causing it to veer off the road and into a tree. Daniel Hawkins, Jacob Ivascu and Drake Ruiz, all 16-year-old passengers, were killed in the crash. The 18-year-old driver and two other boys, ages 13 and 14, were injured but survived. In 2023, he was sentenced to life in prison without the possibility of parole.

A 27-year-old man of Spotsylvania County, Virginia, was charged on in May 2025 with second degree-murder, malicious wounding and use of a firearm in commission of a felony after fatally shooting an 18-year-old who was filming a ding dong ditch prank for TikTok along with two younger friends. The three teenagers had already knocked on a few doors in a neighborhood unfamiliar to them when they were shot by Tyler Chase Butler while running away. Two of them were wounded, one of them sustaining minor injuries while the other later died. In an affidavit, the juvenile advised: "It's something that people are doing to put on TikTok."

On August 30, 2025 an 11-year-old boy was shot and killed in the east area of Houston after taking part in the prank.

=== Canada ===
In 2023, On Vancouver Island, Owen May took extreme measures to catch teens playing "Nicky Nicky Nine Doors" at his home in Courtenay, British Columbia. May, a fisherman, set up a fishing line trap outside his door. One night, a teen got caught in the trap, leading to a confrontation between May, his partner, and the teen. Both parties required medical attention.

In July 2023, in the city of Saguenay, Quebec, a couple pursued teenagers who were playing "ring and run". After being alerted by the youths' screams, the couple, with no prior criminal record, threatened one of the teenagers with a knife and made death threats. They were arrested by the police for armed threats.

On October 2, 2024, Stéphanie Borel, a woman from Longueuil, Quebec, allegedly poured boiling water on a young boy. Two days after the event, she called the authorities, claiming she had acted in response to repeated "ding dong ditch" pranks at her home.

=== Australia ===
On 6 January 2025, on the Gold Coast, a 12-year-old boy on an e-bike was hit by a car driven by a 58-year-old man, who then got out of his car and began calling the boy's e-bike "completely illegal". The man was later identified as Howard Wright, an Australian bar owner, who initially claimed that the boy rode out in front of him. The boy was wearing a helmet-mounted camera, which recorded a passerby saying "he's just a kid", with Wright responding "Sorry? I know he is. They [the boy and his friends] are ringing my doorbell every day", followed by "They are terrorising this neighbourhood". Wright was given a traffic infringement notice for driving without care and attention and a A$700 fine.

=== Other countries ===
In 2018, the governments of India and Pakistan accused each other's diplomats of ringing the doorbells of the other government senior diplomatic staff at 3am and then running away.

== See also ==
- Mischief Night
- Trick-or-treat
