= Araxá Airport =

Romeu Zema Airport Aeroporto Romeu Zema
- IATA: AAX; ICAO: SBAX; LID: MG0008

Summary
- Airport type: Public
- Serves: Araxá
- Time zone: BRT (UTC−03:00)
- Elevation AMSL: 998 m (3,274 ft)
- Coordinates: 19°33′47″S 046°57′38″W

Map
- Location in Brazil AAX (Brazil)

Runways
Direction	Length		Surface
Direction	m	ft	Surface
16/34	1,900	6,234	Asphalt
- Sources: ANAC, DECEA

Romeu Zema Airport (IATA: AAX, ICAO: SBAX) is the airport serving Araxá, Brazil. It is named after Romeu Zema, a local entrepreneur.

== Airlines and destinations ==
Airlines	Destinations
Azul Conecta	Belo Horizonte–Confins

== Access ==
The airport is located 4 km (2 mi) from downtown Araxá.

== See also ==
- List of airports in Brazil
