= Clóvis Beviláqua =

Brazilian jurist, historian and journalist

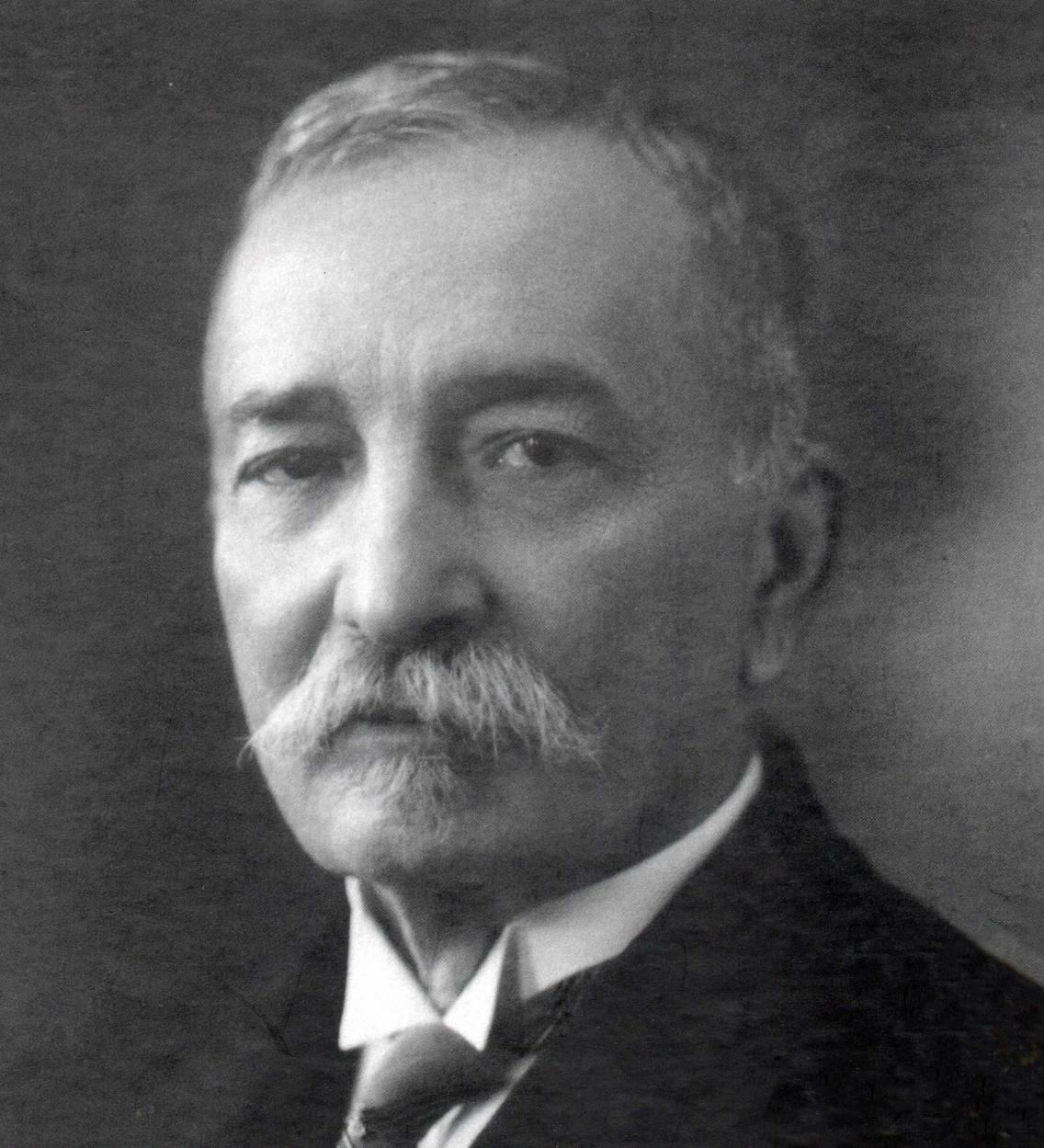
Clóvis Beviláqua

Clóvis Beviláqua (4 October 1859 – 26 July 1944) was a Brazilian jurist, historian and journalist born in Viçosa do Ceará, Ceará, in 1859. Beviláqua was professor of civil and comparative law in Recife. As the author of the Brazilian Civil Code of 1916, whose first draft he presented in 1899, and as that code's first commentator, Beviláqua was the founding father of Brazilian civil law scholarship. He founded and occupied the 14th chair of the Brazilian Academy of Letters, from 1897 until his death in 1944. The chair's patron is Franklin Távora.

Preceded by Franklin Távora (patron)	Brazilian Academy of Letters - Occupant of the 14th chair 1897 — 1944	Succeeded by Antônio Carneiro Leão
