= Nickanan Night =

Cornish feast

Nickanan Night (sometimes called Hall Monday or Peasen Monday) is a Cornish feast, traditionally held during Shrovetide, specifically on Shrove Monday.

Sometimes called roguery night in West Cornwall, England, UK, this event was an excuse for local youths to undertake acts of minor vandalism and play practical jokes on neighbours and family. The name Nickanan may come from the practice of knocking on doors and running away which is known as Nicky nicky nine doors in some parts of the English-speaking world. The eating of pea soup and salt bacon was also associated with this date.

== 19th century description ==
In the 19th century, Thomas Quiller Couch described Nickanan Night:

On the day termed Hall Monday, which precedes Shrove Tuesday, about the dusk of the evening, it is the custom for boys, and, in some cases, for those who are above the age of boys, to prowl about the streets with short clubs, and to knock loudly at every door, running off to escape detection on the slightest sign of a motion within. If, however, no attention be excited, and especially if any article be discovered negligently exposed, or carelessly guarded, then the things are carried away; and on the following day are discovered displayed in some conspicuous place, to expose the disgraceful want of vigilance supposed to characterise the owner. The time when this is practised is called 'Nicka-nan night' and the individuals concerned are supposed to represent some imps of darkness, that seize on and expose unguarded moments.

— Thomas Quiller Couch,

== Traditional rhymes ==
The following rhyme was used by the Cornish children during the evening and the following day Shrove Tuesday:

Nicka nicka nan
Give me some pancake, and then I'll be gone
But if you give me none
I'll throw a great stone
And down your door shall come.

In St Ives, this was:

Give me a pancake, now—now—now,
Or I will souse in your door with a row—tow—tow.

—

== Trigg meat ==
In coastal communities, it was also traditional to gather shell fish such as limpets, mussels and winkles. This practice was known as 'going a triggin' and the produce gathered known as 'trigg meat'. This is still practised at Easter by people living close to the Helford River.

== Jack o' Lent ==
During this 'Nickanan' period, another custom prevailed throughout Cornwall. In some villages, it was usual to make a 'Jack o' Lent,' a straw figure dressed not unlike a Guy Fawkes Night effigy. This Jack o' Lent was paraded through local communities and pelted with projectiles and then burned on a bonfire. This practice was common in Polperro until the late 19th century. Fire rituals such as those associated with the Jack o' Lent may also indicate Celtic pagan origins and may be closely related to the Imbolc festival.

== Hurling ==
The popularity of Cornish Hurling during the 'Nickanan' season indicates similarity to St. Ives feast and other festivities near Candlemas. The 'Hurling of the silver ball' at St Columb Major still occurs during the run up to Lent.

== See also ==
- Chewidden Thursday
- Tom Bawcock's Eve
- Picrous Day
- Golowan
