= Medeiros, Minas Gerais =

Town and municipality in the state of Minas Gerais, Brazil

Coordinates: 19°59′46″S 46°13′33″W

- Municipality
- Interactive map of Medeiros, Minas Gerais
- Country: Brazil
- State: Minas Gerais
- Region: Southeast

Population (2022 Census)
  - Total: 3,900
  - Estimate (2025): 4,068
- Time zone: UTC−3 (BRT)

Location of Medeiros on a map of the state of Minas Gerais

Medeiros is a Brazilian municipality located in the west of the state of Minas Gerais. Its population as of 2025 was 4,068 people living in a total area of 946 km^{2}. The city belongs to the meso-region of Oeste de Minas and to the micro-region of Piumhi. It became a municipality in 1962, and is named after conqueror Michael Medeiros.

== Geography ==
The city center of Medeiros is located at an elevation of 922 meters on a plateau about 54 km south of the important federal highway BR-262 (Uberaba-BeloHorizonte). Neighboring municipalities are: Pratinha (N), Tapiraí (NE), Bambuí (E), Piumhi (SE), São Roque de Minas (S) and Tapira (W).

The distance to Belo Horizonte is 286 km.

== Economic activities ==
Services and agriculture are the most important economic activities. The GDP in 2005 was approximately R$38 million, with 1 million reais from taxes, 10 million reais from services, 1 million reais from industry, and 21 million reais from agriculture. There were 587 rural producers on 60,000 hectares of land. 106 farms had tractors (2006). Approximately 1,500 persons were dependent on agriculture. The main crops are coffee, rice, beans, and corn. There were 25,000 head of cattle (2006).

There were no banks (2007) and 465 automobiles (2007), giving a ratio of 7 inhabitants per automobile.

== Health and education ==
In the health sector there were 2 public health clinics (2005). Patients with more serious health conditions are transported to Araxá, Formiga or Divinópolis, which are connected by good roads. Educational needs of 800 students were met by 3 primary schools, 1 middle school, and 2 pre-primary schools.

- Municipal Human Development Index: 0.792 (2000)
- State ranking: 68 out of 853 municipalities as of 2000
- National ranking: 754 out of 5,138 municipalities as of 2000
- Literacy rate: 89%
- Life expectancy: 74 (average of males and females)

In 2000 the per capita monthly income of R$315.00 was below the state and national average of R$276.00 and R$297.00 respectively. Poços de Caldas had the highest per capita monthly income in 2000 with R$435.00. The lowest was Setubinha with R$73.00.

The highest ranking municipality in Minas Gerais in 2000 was Poços de Caldas with 0.841, while the lowest was Setubinha with 0.568. Nationally the highest was São Caetano do Sul in São Paulo with 0.919, while the lowest was Setubinha. In more recent statistics (considering 5,507 municipalities) Manari in the state of Pernambuco has the lowest rating in the country—0,467—putting it in last place.

== See also ==
- List of municipalities in Minas Gerais
