= Franklin Távora =

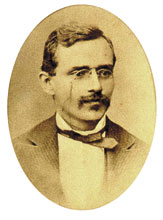
- Born: João Franklin da Silveira Távora; 13 January 1842; Baturité, Ceará, Brazil
- Died: 18 August 1888 (aged 46); Rio de Janeiro City, Rio de Janeiro, Brazil
- Education: Faculdade de Direito de Recife
- Occupations: Lawyer, journalist, novelist, politician, dramatist
- Writing career
- Pen name: Semprônio
- Period: 1861–1879
- Notable work: O Cabeleira
- Movement: Romanticism

João Franklin da Silveira Távora (January 13, 1842 – August 18, 1888) was a Brazilian novelist, journalist, politician, lawyer and dramatist, famous for his Regionalist romance O Cabeleira, set in 18th-century Pernambuco. He wrote under the pen names Semprônio and Farisvest.

He is patron of the 14th chair of the Brazilian Academy of Letters.

== Life ==
João Franklin da Silveira Távora was born in the city of Baturité, Ceará, to Camilo Henrique da Silveira Távora and Maria de Santana da Silveira. He made his primary studies in Fortaleza. He moved with his parents to Pernambuco in 1854, ingressing at Law course in Recife, graduating in 1863. In 1874, he moves to Rio de Janeiro, writing for journals A Consciência Livre and A Verdade.

Along with Nicolau Midosi, he founded the Revista Brasileira, which lasted from 1879 to 1881. He polemized with José de Alencar's idealist Romanticism. He also founded the Associação dos Homens de Letras and was a member of the Brazilian Historic and Geographic Institute.

He died on August 18, 1888.

== Works ==
- Trindade Maldita (1861)
- Os Índios do Jaguaribe (1862)
- Um Mistério de Família (1862)
- A Casa de Palha (1866)
- Um Casamento no Arrabalde (1869)
- Três Lágrimas (1870)
- Cartas de Semprônio a Cincinato (1871)
- O Cabeleira (1876)
- O Matuto (1878)
- Lourenço (1878)
- Lendas e Tradições do Norte (1878)
- O Sacrifício (1879)

Preceded by New creation	Brazilian Academy of Letters - Patron of the 14th chair	Succeeded by Clóvis Beviláqua (founder)
