= Tapiraí, Minas Gerais =

Tapiraí
- Municipality
- Location in São Paulo state

- Location in Brazil
- Coordinates: 19°53′16″S 46°01′12″W
- Country: Brazil
- Region: Southeast
- State: São Paulo

Area
  - Total: 412,442 km^{2} (159,245 sq mi)

Population (2022 Census)
  - Total: 1,690
  - Estimate (2025): 1,698
  - Density: 0.00410/km^{2} (0.0106/sq mi)
- Time zone: UTC−3 (BRT)

Tapiraí is a Brazilian municipality located in the west of the state of Minas Gerais. Its population as of 2025 was 1,698 people living in a total area of 407 km^{2}. The city belongs to the meso-region of Oeste de Minas and to the micro-region of Piumhi. It became a municipality in 1954.

== Geography ==
The city center of Tapiraí is located at an elevation of 673 meters on a plateau about 32 km south of the important federal highway BR-262 (Uberaba-BeloHorizonte), to which it is connected by highway BR-354. Neighboring municipalities are: Campos Altos (N), Córrego Danta (E), Bambuí (S), Piumhi (S), and Medeiros (W).

The distance to Belo Horizonte is 261 km.

== Economic activities ==
Services and agriculture are the most important economic activities. The GDP in 2005 was approximately R$23 million, with one half million reais from taxes, 7 million reais from services, one half million reais from industry, and 15 million reais from agriculture. There were 298 rural producers on 24,000 hectares of land. 38 farms had tractors (2006). Approximately 1,000 persons were dependent on agriculture. The main crops are coffee, rice, beans, and corn. There were 14,000 head of cattle (2006).

There were no banks (2007) and 166 automobiles (2007), giving a ratio of 5 inhabitants per automobile.

== Health and education ==
In the health sector there were 3 public health clinics (2005). Patients with more serious health conditions are transported to Araxá, Formiga or Divinópolis, which are connected by good roads. Educational needs of 315 students were met by 2 primary schools, 1 middle school, and 1 pre-primary school.

- Municipal Human Development Index: 0.739 (2000)
- State ranking: 357 out of 853 municipalities as of 2000
- National ranking: 2171 out of 5,138 municipalities as of 2000
- Literacy rate: 84%
- Life expectancy: 72 (average of males and females)

In 2000 the per capita monthly income of R$182.00 was below the state and national average of R$277.00 and R$297.00 respectively. Poços de Caldas had the highest per capita monthly income in 2000 with R$435.00. The lowest was Setubinha with R$73.00.

The highest ranking municipality in Minas Gerais in 2000 was Poços de Caldas with 0.841, while the lowest was Setubinha with 0.568. Nationally the highest was São Caetano do Sul in São Paulo with 0.919, while the lowest was Setubinha. In more recent statistics (considering 5,507 municipalities) Manari in the state of Pernambuco has the lowest rating in the country—0,467—putting it in last place.

== See also ==
- List of municipalities in Minas Gerais
