= St Piran's Day =

National day of Cornwall

Saint Piran's Day
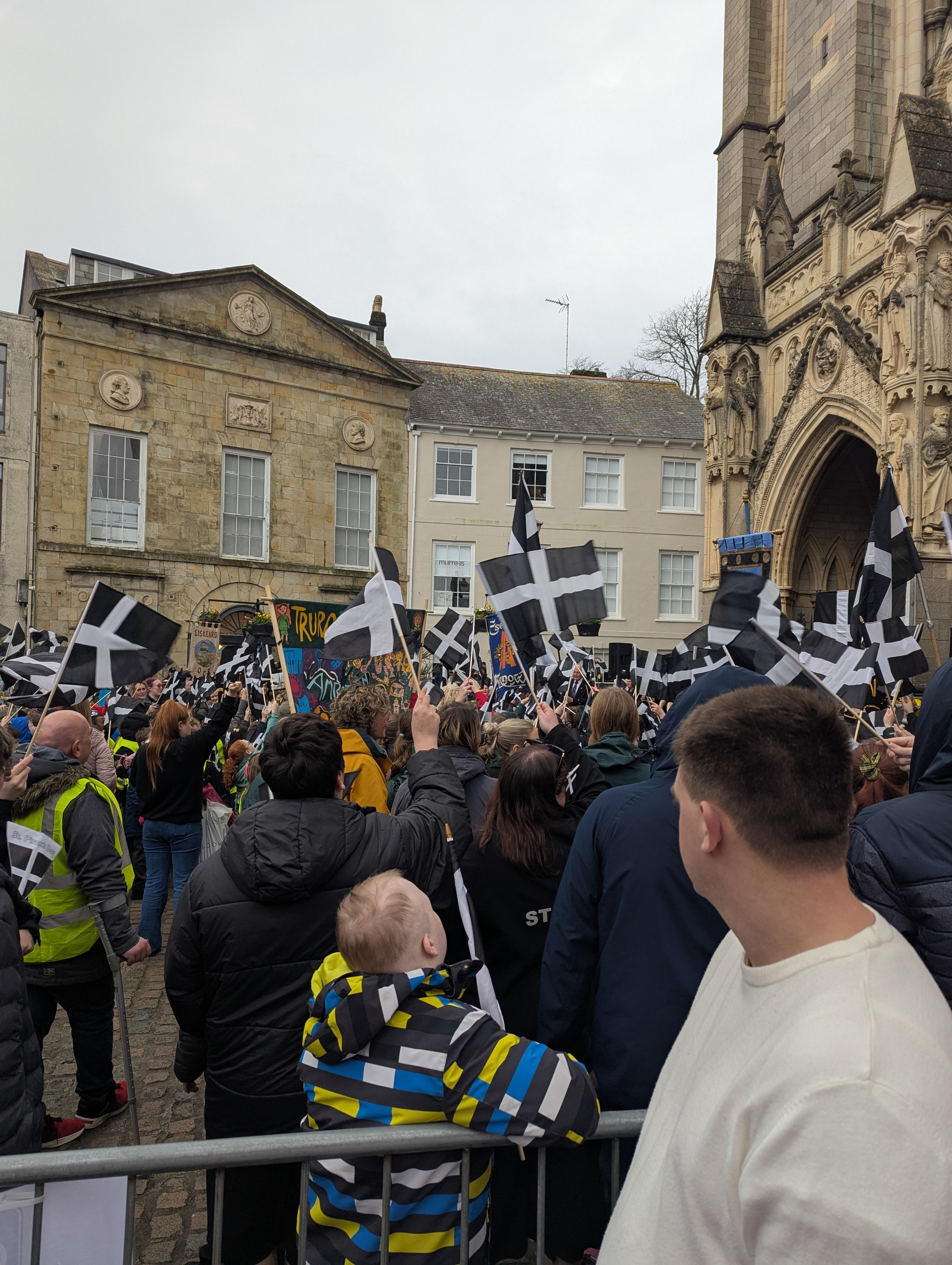
- St Piran's day parade at Truro in 2026
- Observed by: Cornish people
- Type: National day
- Celebrations: Parades and social events, religious observations
- Date: 5 March
- Next time: 5 March 2027
- Frequency: Annual

Saint Piran's Day (Cornish: Gool Peran), or the Feast of Saint Piran, is the national day of Cornwall, held on 5 March every year. The day is named after one of the patron saints of Cornwall, Saint Piran, who is also the patron saint of tin miners.

== Origins ==
St Piran's Day started as one of the many tinners' holidays observed by the tin miners of Cornwall. Other miners' holidays of a similar nature include Picrous Day and Chewidden Thursday. The miners of Breage and Germoe observed St Piran's feast day as that of their patron saint until at least 1764.

"St. Piran's Day was said to be a favourite with the tinners who having a tradition that some secrets regarding the manufacture of tin were communicated to their ancestors by that saint, they leave the manufacture to shift for itself for that day, and keep it as a holiday." There is little description of specific traditions associated with this day apart from the consumption of large amounts of alcohol and food during 'Perrantide', the week leading up to 5 March. The day following the St Piran's Day was known by many as 'Mazey Day', a term which has now been adopted by the revived Golowan festival in Penzance. The phrase 'drunk as a Perraner' was used in 19th century Cornwall to describe people who had consumed large quantities of alcohol.

== Revival ==
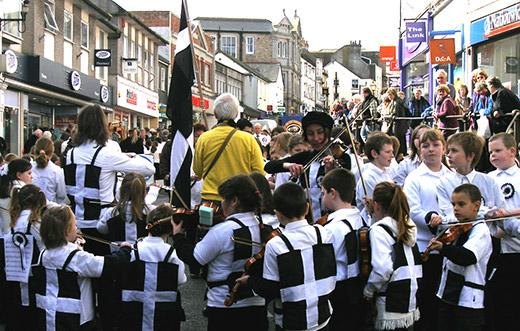
St Piran's day parade at Penzance in 2006

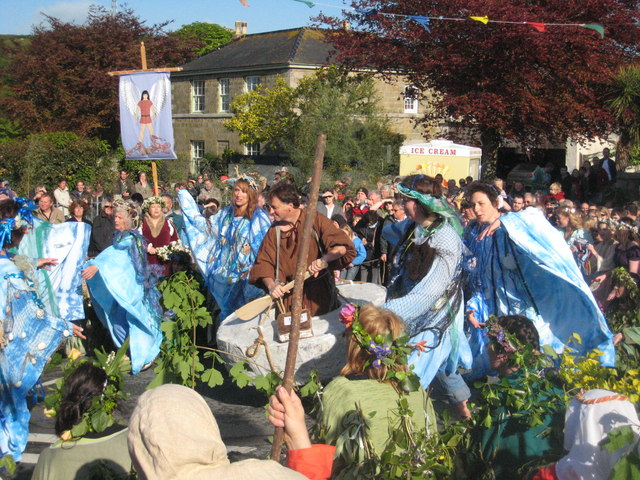
A re-enactment of Piran crossing the Irish Sea, Helston, Floral Day 2009

The modern observance of St Piran's day as a national symbol of the people of Cornwall started in the late 19th and early 20th century when Celtic Revivalists sought to provide the people of Cornwall with a national day similar to those observed in other nations. Since the 1950s, the celebration has become increasingly observed and since the start of the 21st century almost every Cornish community holds some sort of celebration to mark the event. Saint Piran's Flag is also seen flying throughout Cornwall on this day.

Parades and celebrations take place in a number of towns and cities including:

- Bodmin – A parade through the streets with Cornish pipers and a children's dance. Speeches by various notables, including the town mayor, Lord Lieutenant, and Grand Bard of Cornwall, followed by children's performances of Cornish plays and songs. 400 people attended the parade in 2009. The parade was started in 1999.
- Bude – a St Piran's day walk led by a piper and attended by hundreds of people annually.
- Callington – Shop decorations and a St Piran's Supper with Cornish music and poetry.
- Falmouth – parade through the town including nearly 100 school children. Shop window competition.
- Penzance – annual performance of St Piran Furry dance and procession through the streets by 500 children. Annual St Piran Schools Concert.
- Redruth – first held in 2011 and billed as the biggest St Piran's celebration in Cornwall. It includes entertainments in the town centre before a parade to the rugby club where there are a market and fairground rides, as well as a rugby match. During the evening there are various live music events at venues across the town. In 2011 over 2000 people attended the rugby club events while hundreds more attended events in the town. 2012 saw three separate marches from different parts of the town converge as one giant procession at the miner's statue before heading to the rugby club.
- St Ives – Procession through the streets.
- Truro – Procession through the streets ending with speeches outside Truro Cathedral with music and dance also playing a large part in the celebrations. An annual shop window dressing competition has its winner announced outside Truro Cathedral on St Piran's Day. Hundreds of people attend the parade annually.
- United States – St Piran's day is also celebrated annually in Grass Valley, California, United States, to honour the Cornish miners who participated in the area's mining history beginning in the mid 19th century. In addition, Cornish genealogy organisations throughout the United States meet in celebration of Cornish history.

== St Piran's Day Bank Holiday proposals ==
In 2006, Cornish MP Dan Rogerson asked the government to make 5 March a public holiday in Cornwall to recognise St Piran's Day celebrations. Some council workers in Bodmin were granted the holiday in 2006, and from 2009 Penzance Town Council has offered its employees a St Piran's Day Holiday, following a campaign by the Celtic League. A total of nine town and city councils across Cornwall have given their staff the day off.

There have been other calls and petitions for a Cornish public holiday on 5 March. It has been suggested that a move from the May Day Bank Holiday to a St Piran's Day Bank Holiday in Cornwall would be worth £20–35 million to the Cornish economy.

In December 2011, Cornwall Council voted in favour of asking the government to make St Piran's Day a bank holiday in Cornwall, should they decide to move the May Day holiday.

A petition for a county-wide day off on the Cornwall Council website closed with only 363 signatures, far short of the 50,000 signatures required.

Towns and cities that give their staff an annual day off work for St Piran's Day:

- Bodmin Town Council
- Penzance Town Council
- Truro City Council
- Hayle Town Council
- St Columb Major Town Council
- St Blazey Town Council
- St Ives Town Council
- Camelford Town Council
- Redruth Town Council

Schools that give parents the option of taking their children out of school for the day:

- Falmouth Secondary School
- Penryn Secondary School
- Mylor Primary School
- Mabe Primary School
- Mawnan Smith Primary School
- Flushing Primary School

== See also ==
- List of county days in the United Kingdom
- St David's Day, a similar holiday in Wales
- Yorkshire Day
- Piran, an unrelated town in Slovenia with the same name
