= Racial Justice Sunday =

- Date: Second Sunday in February
- Frequency: Annual

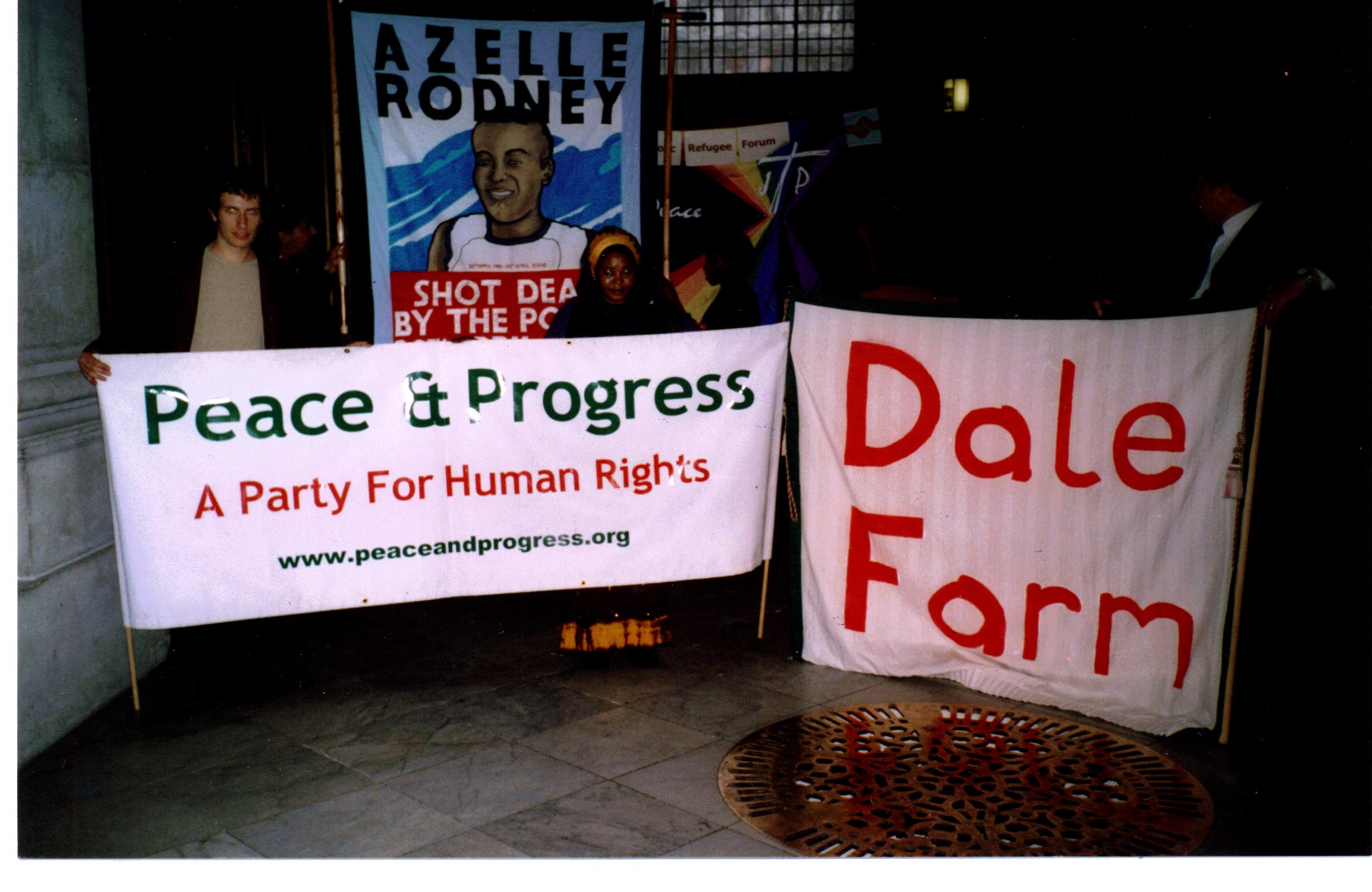
At the entrance to St Paul's Cathedral, London, featuring banners from Peace and Progress, Dale Farm and Azelle Rodney campaigns.

Racial Justice Sunday is observed by British Christian churches on the second Sunday of February. It began in 1995. On 11 September 2005, special celebrations were held in Cardiff, Glasgow, and London for the tenth anniversary of this day of observance.

The Methodist Church in Britain describes Racial Justice Sunday as "an opportunity for all Christians to join together in:

- Reflecting on the importance of racial justice
- Thanksgiving for human diversity
- Prayer for an end to misunderstanding, racism and injustice
- Action that truly makes a difference
- Fundraising for national and local racial justice initiatives."

Racial Justice Sunday moved from the second Sunday of September to the second Sunday of February, with effect from 2017, at the same time as Education Sunday was moved to the second Sunday in September because of its more logical connection with the start of the school year. In 2023 the day will be marked on 12 February.
