= Sul e Sudoeste de Minas (mesoregion) =

- Mesoregion
- Location of Sul and Sudoeste de Minas
- Coordinates: 21°47′16″S 46°33′39″W
- Country: Brazil
- Region: Southeast
- State: Minas Gerais

Area
  - Total: 49,523.893 km^{2} (19,121.282 sq mi)

Population (2006/IBGE)
  - Total: 2,463,618
  - Density: 49.7/km^{2} (129/sq mi)
- Time zone: UTC-3 (BRT)
  - Summer (DST): UTC-2 (BRST)

Sul e Sudoeste de Minas (transl. South and Southwestern Minas) is one of the twelve mesoregions of the Brazilian state of Minas Gerais. It is composed of 146 municipalities distributed across 10 microregions.
