= Chalica =

Unitarian Universalist holiday in December

Chalica is a holiday celebrated by some Unitarian Universalists. It traditionally begins on the first Monday in December and lasts seven days, though a seven-week variant beginning in January is also observed.

== History ==
Chalica was created as a holiday in 2005 by Daylene Marshall. While it has gained followers since, it is not a widely celebrated holiday.

== Observance ==
On each of the seven nights (or weeks), a different principle of Unitarian Universalism is honored. On each day, a chalice is ignited, the day's principle is read, and ways of honoring the principle are enacted, such as volunteering or donating to a social justice cause. There is no rule for how the chalice or display should look, but there are traditionally seven candles around the chalice, one for each principle. Activities on each day vary, and may include discussions, group activities, and songs.

== Variations ==
To solve the problem of having only a single week in which to cram seven nonnominal deeds for the seven Unitarian Universalist principles, the Unitarian Universalist Church of Bowling Green in Kentucky extends Chalica into a seven-week observance. Further, Chalica at the Unitarian Universalist Church of Bowling Green starts on the first Sunday in January as an extension of the New Year's resolution concept.
