= Festa do Rosário =

Main Christian festival in Córrego Danta, Brazil

The Festa de Nossa Senhora do Rosário (Brazilian Portuguese for 'Festival of Our Lady of the Rosary'), held during the third weekend of August, is the patronal festival of Córrego Danta, in Minas Gerais, Brazil.

Involving almost all of its Catholic citizens, the Festa do Rosário is the main celebration in the city. It starts with a mass in the main church and then a procession to the Church of Our Lady of the Rosary.

== Sources ==
- da Silva, Vagner Gonçalves; da Silva, Rubens Alves; de Gusmão, Neusa Maria Mendes; de Souza, Mônica Dias; Nunes, Maria Helena; dos Santos, Lourival; Zaluar, Amelia (2007). Imaginário, Cotidiano e Poder (in Brazilian Portuguese). São Paulo: Selo Negro. ISBN 9788587478283.
- "Festa de Nossa Senhora do Rosário em Minas Novas". Ouro Preto World (in Brazilian Portuguese). Archived from the original on 29 May 2014.
- "O Rosário". Paratiando (in Brazilian Portuguese). November 2009. Archived from the original on 28 September 2013.

== See also ==
- Our Lady of the Rosary of Chiquinquirá
