= Juruaia =

Coordinates: 21°15′S 46°35′W

Juruaia More Information - http://www.juruaia.com.br
- Municipality
- Nickname: Capital Mineira da Lingerie
- Interactive map of Juruaia
- Country: Brazil
- Region: Southeast
- State: Minas Gerais
- Mesoregion: Sul/Sudoeste de Minas

Population (2020)
  - Total: 10,681
- Time zone: UTC−3 (BRT)

Juruaia is a municipality in the state of Minas Gerais in the Southeast region of Brazil.

== See also ==
- List of municipalities in Minas Gerais
