= Córrego Danta =

Town and municipality in the state of Minas Gerais, Brazil

Coordinates: 19°48′S 45°54′W

- Municipality
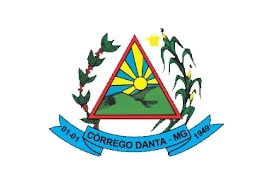
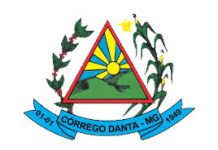
- Flag Coat of arms
- Interactive map of Córrego Danta
- Country: Brazil
- State: Minas Gerais
- Region: Southeast

Population (2022 Census)
  - Total: 2,960
  - Estimate (2025): 2,956
- Time zone: UTC−3 (BRT)

Location of Córrego Danta in the state of Minas Gerais

Córrego Danta is a town located in the state of Minas Gerais, Brazil.

Córrego Danta was once the district of another city, Luz, until it became autonomous on January 1, 1949. It is situated in the center-west region of Minas Gerais, in the region called Alto do São Francisco, which means the heights of the São Francisco, in reference to its high altitude and propinquity to the source of this river.

As of 2025, the estimated population of Córrego Danta is 2,956 inhabitants, and 657.425 km^{2} of area, making it one of the smaller cities in Minas Gerais, along with the cities of Luz, Bambuí, Tapiraí, Campos Altos, Santa Rosa da Serra, and Estrela do Indaiá.

== History ==
In 1868 the small village was elevated to a district of Luz, receiving the name of "São José do Córrego Danta" ("Saint Joseph of Córrego Danta"). It was renamed in 1923 simply as Córrego Danta. Córrego Danta means "Tapirs' Stream", in reference to the populations of these animals that roamed during the colonial era the edges of the streamlet that passes by the town.

== Economy ==
The main economical activities are based on agriculture, with the plantation of coffee, sugar cane, corn, and manioc, and dairy farming. The main rivers and streams are Araras Stream, Perdição River, Indaiá River and the Córrego Danta. All are connected to the São Francisco basin.

== Natural aspects ==
Córrego Danta also has several natural attractions, such as waterfalls and the Bueno Mountain, near the town. Vegetation is composed of what is called locally the cerrado, which resembles a savannah. Several forest-dwelling animals live in the region, like the lobo-guará (a Brazilian wolf species), tamandua (another animal native to Brazil) and the onça-pintada, a jaguar species named after its spotted pattern in its skin.

== Religiosity and main religious celebrations ==
Religiosity is intrinsic to its people. Córrego Danta's patron saint is Saint Joseph, but the feast of Our Lady of the Rosary (or Festa do Rosário) which happens in the third weekend of August, during four days, is the main celebration. During this festival, people from almost all over the region to see this celebration, marked by its vendors, who sell every kind of cheap product. It resembles a popular fair, when people have fun and celebrate Our Lady and see its beauties and traditions of congado (a dance that came from slaves in the colonial era, brought from Africa).

== See also ==
- List of municipalities in Minas Gerais
