= São Pedro da União =

- Municipality
- Location in Brazil
- Coordinates: 21°7′37″S 46°36′54″W
- Country: Brazil
- Region: Southeast
- State: Minas Gerais
- Mesoregion: Sul/Sudoeste de Minas

Population (2020)
  - Total: 4,610
- Time zone: UTC−3 (BRT)

São Pedro da União is a municipality in the state of Minas Gerais in the Southeast region of Brazil.

== See also ==
- List of municipalities in Minas Gerais
