= Chewidden Thursday =

Festival celebrated by English tin miners

Chewidden Thursday (also known as White Thursday, Chewidden Day or Jew-whidn) was a festival celebrated by the tin miners of West Cornwall on the last clear Thursday before (i.e. at least one week before) Christmas. The festival celebrated the discovery of 'white tin' or smelted tin by St Chiwidden, a little-known Cornish saint who in legend was an associate of St Piran.

Robert Hunt in Popular Romances of the West of England states:

The last Thursday – a clear week before Christmas Day – was formerly always claimed by the tinners as a holiday, and was called by them White-Thursday (Jew-whidn), because on this day, according to tradition, black tin (tin ore) was first melted and refined into white tin. From Jew-whidn to Chi-widden is an easy transition.

== See also ==
- Picrous Day
- Tom Bawcock's Eve
- St Piran's Day
