= Education Sunday =

Christian day of prayer in the UK

Education Sunday is a special day of prayer for all involved in any aspect of education held in the United Kingdom on the second Sunday in September. For some years it was held on the ninth Sunday before Easter, however in 2016, after extensive consultation, it was moved to September to coincide with the start of the school year.

For more than 100 years there has been an annual recognition of Education Sunday held on an ecumenical basis in England and Wales.

Education Sunday is promoted by an ecumenical steering group in association with the Churches’ Joint Education Policy Committee. The ecumenical steering group comprises representatives from the following eight organisations:

- Association of Christian Teachers
- Baptist Union
- Roman Catholic Church
- Church of England National Society
- Methodist Church of Great Britain
- Student Christian Movement
- Salvation Army
- United Reformed Church.

== Further Information ==
- Education Sunday website
