= Araxá =

- Municipality
- Municipality of Araxá
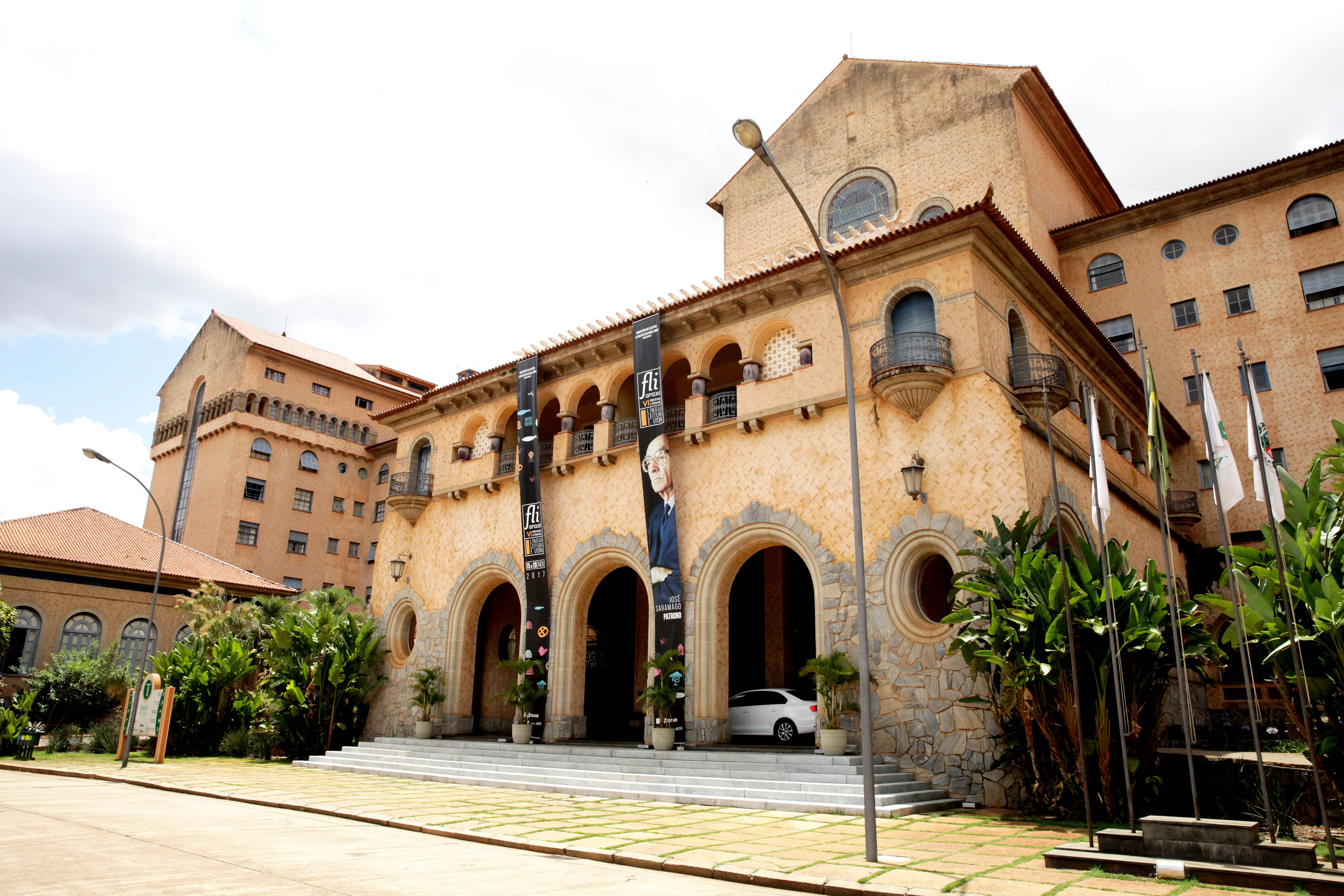
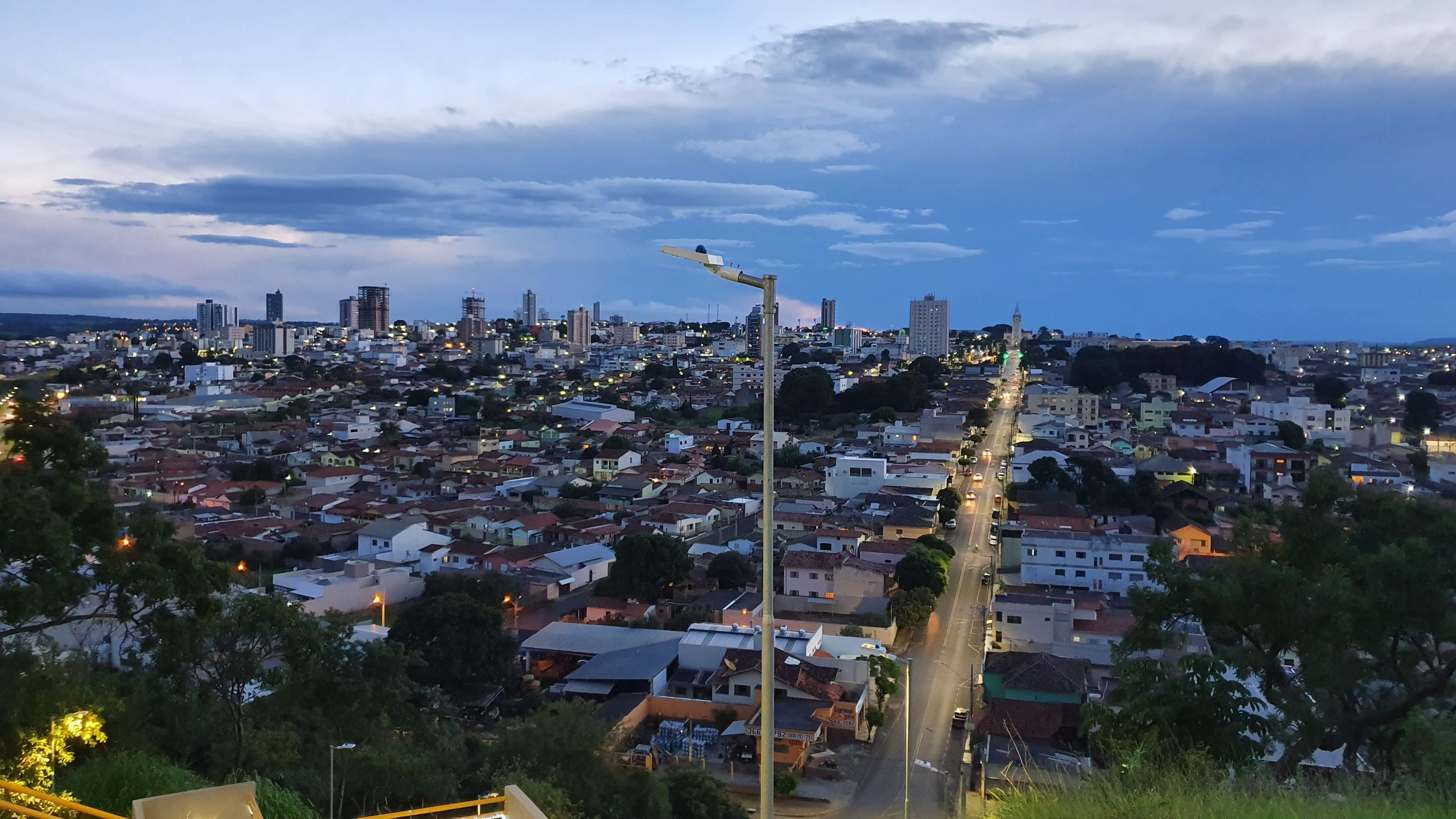
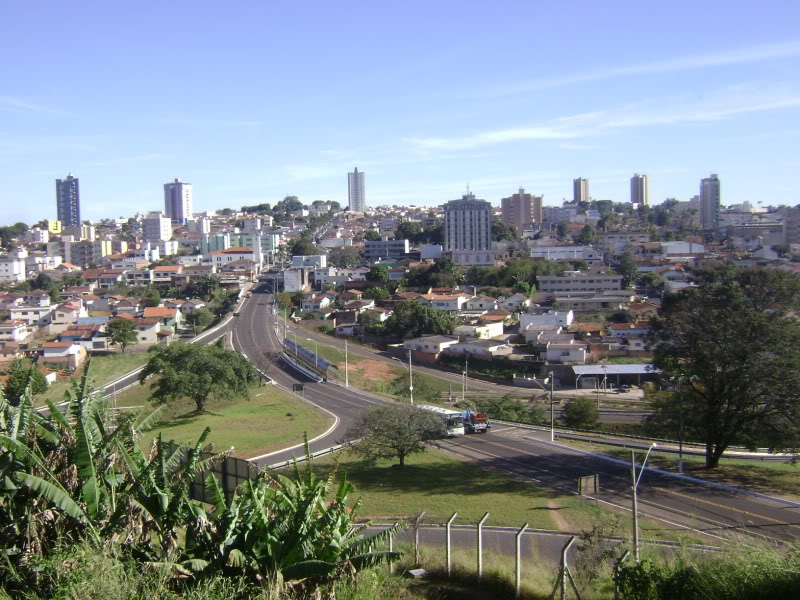
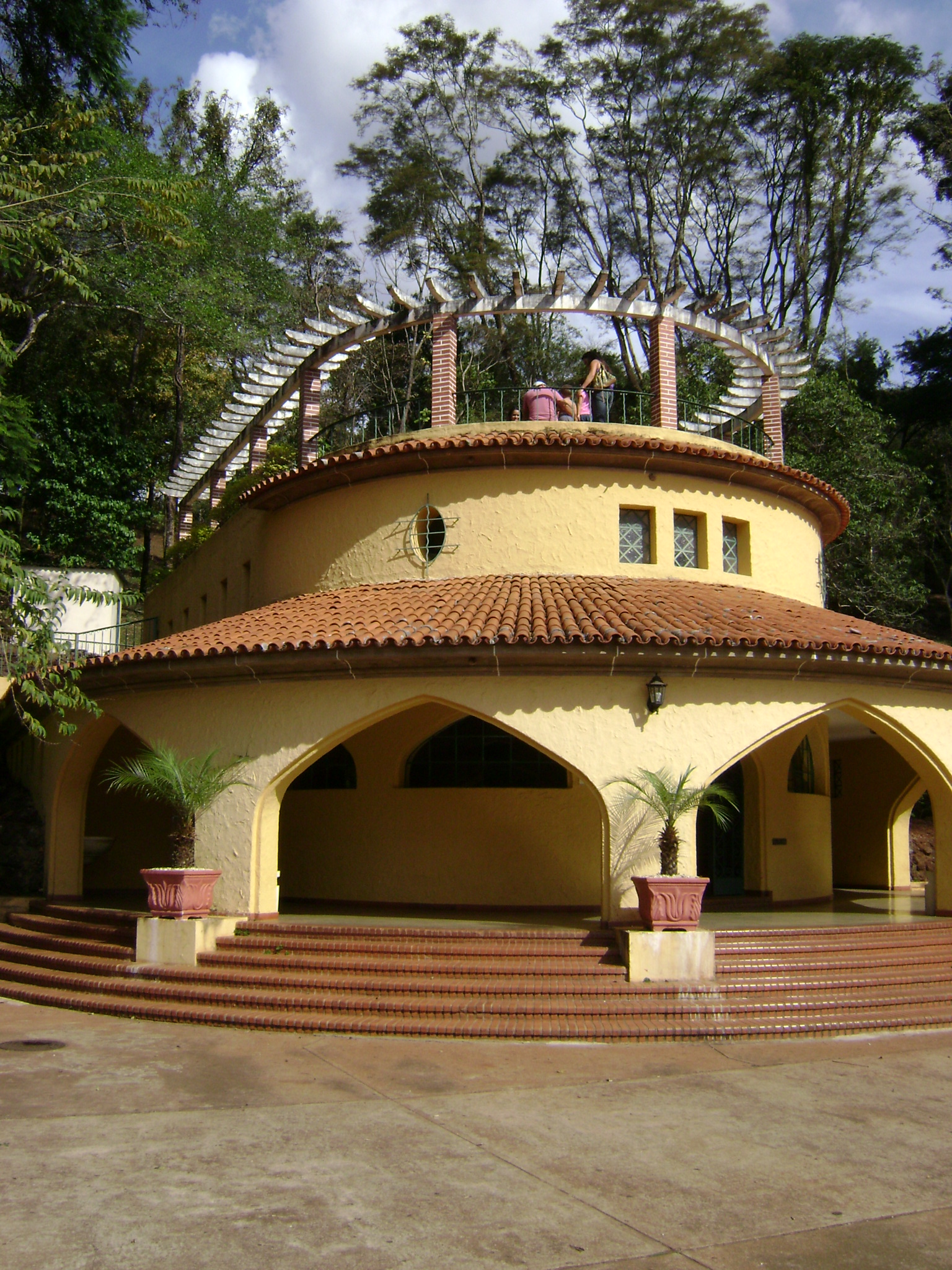
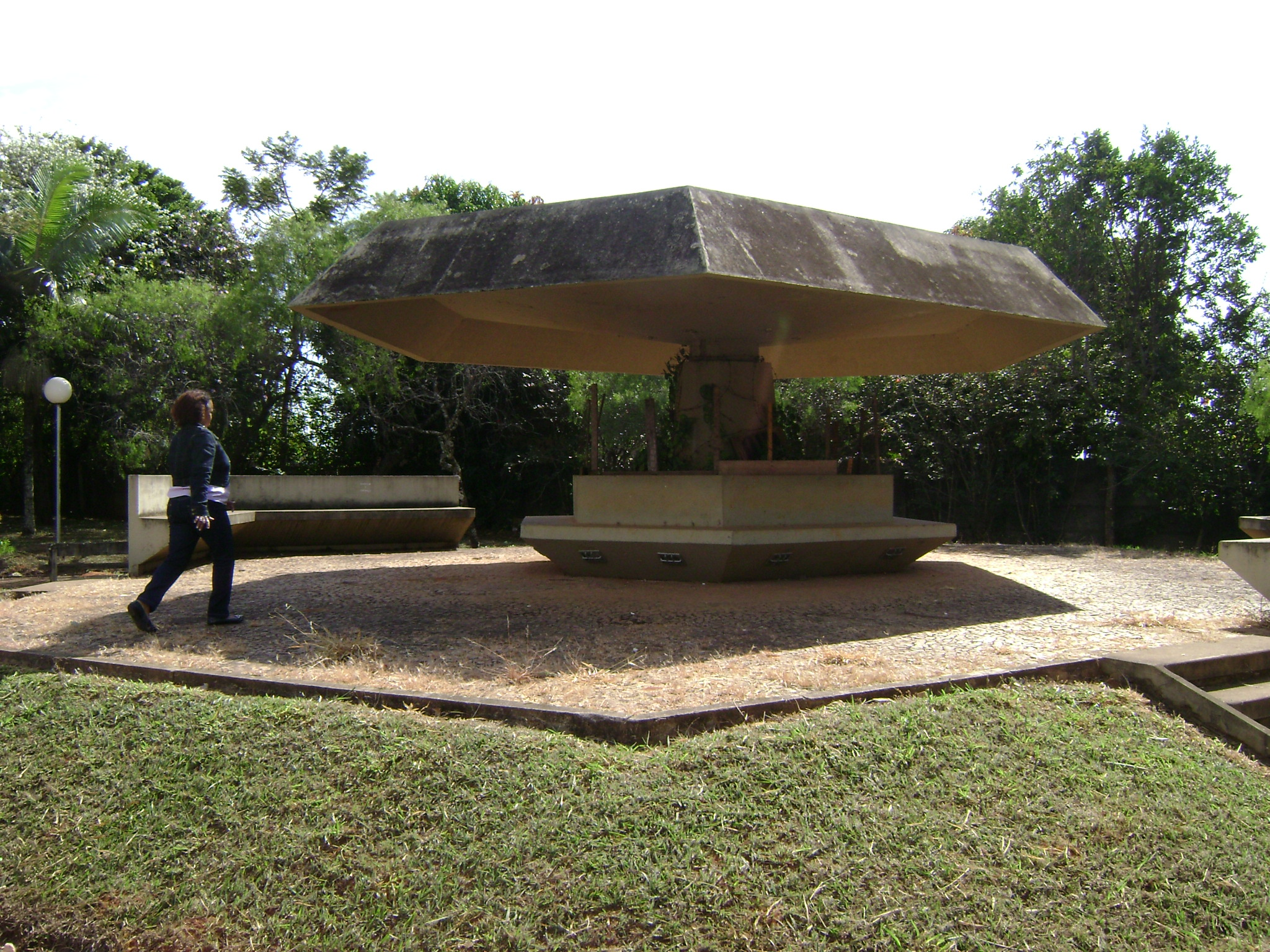
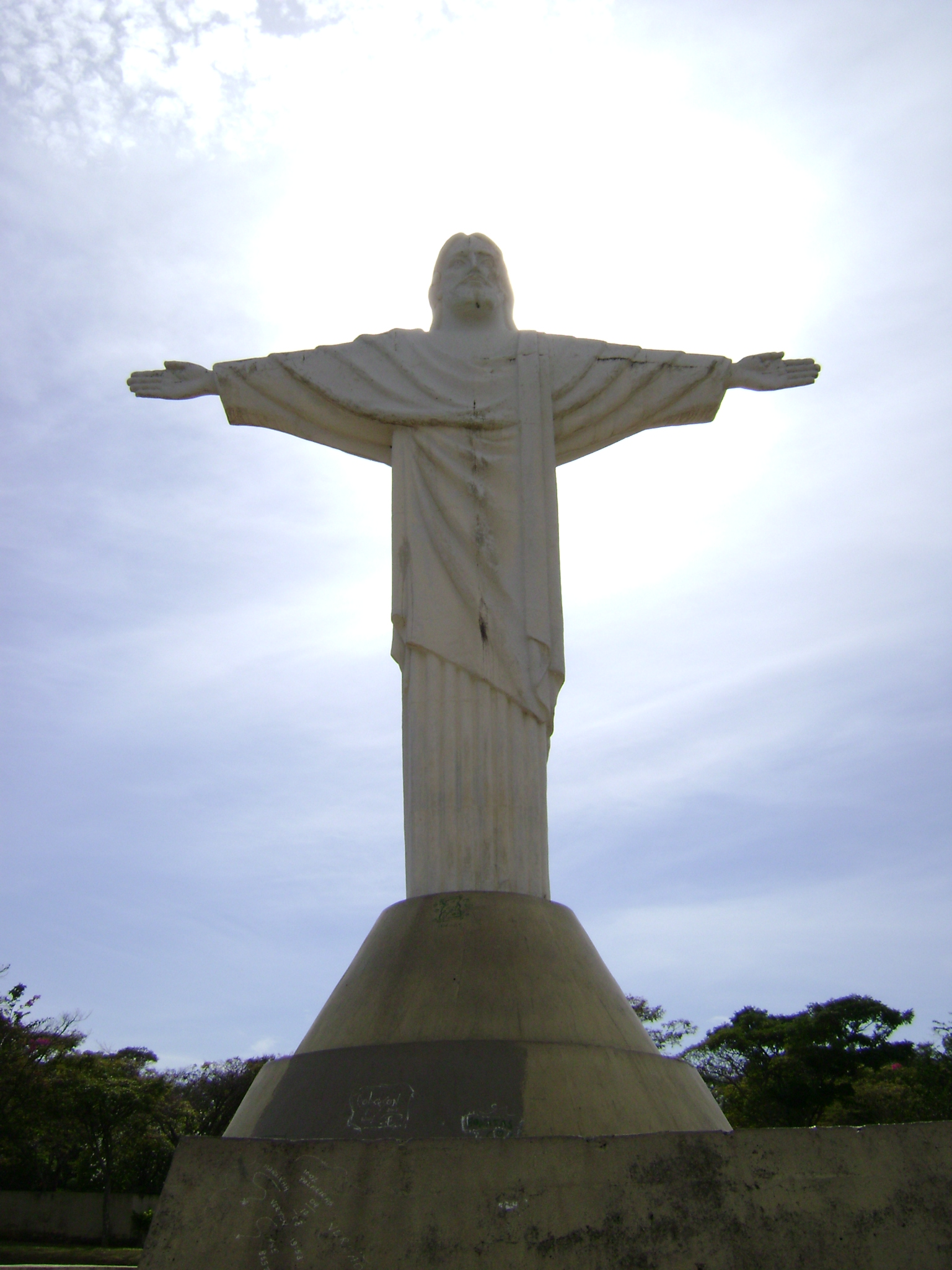
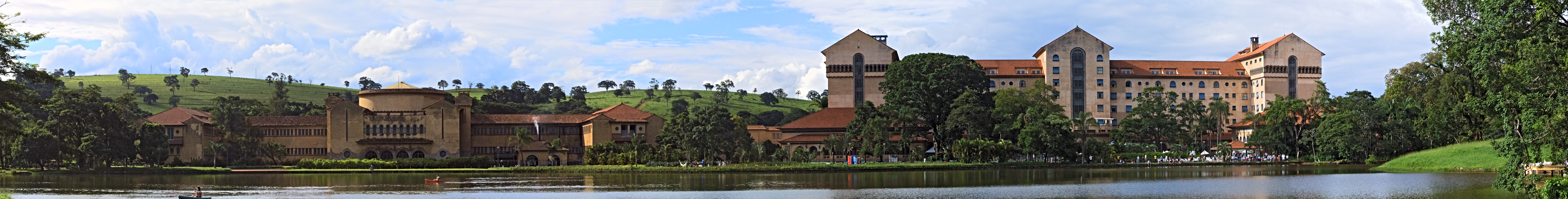

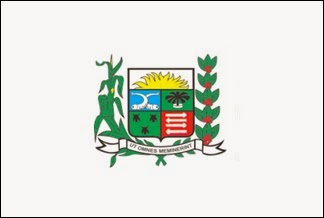
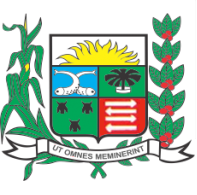
- Flag Coat of arms

- Location of Araxá

- Location of Araxá
- Coordinates: 19°35′34″S 46°56′27″W
- Country: Brazil
- State: Minas Gerais
- Foundation: October 20, 1791

Government
  - Mayor: Robson Magela (CIDADANIA) (2025-2028)

Area
  - Total: 1,165.169 km^{2} (449.874 sq mi)
- Elevation: 973 m (3,192 ft)

Population (2022 Census)
  - Total: 111,691
  - Estimate (2025): 118,786
  - Density: 95.8582/km^{2} (248.272/sq mi)
- Time zone: UTC−3 (BRT)
- HDI (2010): 0.772 – high

Araxá (Portuguese pronunciation: [aɾaˈʃa]) is a municipality in the state of Minas Gerais, Brazil. It is located approximately 370 kilometers (230 miles) northwest of the state capital Belo Horizonte, with an area of 1,283 square kilometres (495 sq mi), and 3.45 square kilometres (1.33 sq mi) designated as the urban perimeter. As of 2022 Census, the population is 111,691.

It serves as the main city of the Immediate Geographic Region of Araxá, which includes 8 municipalities and as of 2017, spans an area of 9,473.902 square kilometers (3,659.27 square miles) with a population of 176,736 inhabitants.

== Toponymy ==
The name "Araxá" was derived from the Araxás, an amerindian tribe that inhabited the region prior to the European colonization of Brazil, and means "the place where the sun is seen first," or, according to its Tupi origin, "elevated place" or "plateau".

Araxó, an extinct Jê language, was once spoken in the region.

== History ==
The earliest accounts of the region date back to the second half of the 16th century, when the first encounters with the indigenous people known as the "Araxás" occurred. The Araxás were a native group reportedly led by a warrior named Andaia-Aru, who had separated from their original tribe, known as the "Cataguases". They settled in the extensive region that includes the Serra da Canastra and the Rio Grande, living in relative peace until the mid-17th century, when European settlers arrived, lured by the area's lush forests and abundant mineral waters.

Interactions between the European settlers and the native population were characterized by frequent conflicts, culminating in the extermination of the Araxá people by the settlers following a bandeira expedition led by Campo Inácio Correia de Pamplona (1731–1810), under the colonial administration of the time. Subsequently, much of the region came under the control of the Captaincy of Minas Gerais, which served as the local administrative division of colonial Brazil.

The first farm owners began to establish themselves in the region around 1770. As settlements grew, the area was designated as a parish in 1791, taking the name "São Domingos de Araxá", in honor of Saint Dominic, the founder of the Order of Preachers.

In 1831, São Domingos de Araxá was elevated to the status of a "vila" (town), and it was granted city status on December 19, 1865, due to its local development. The name "Araxá" was officially adopted three years later, in 1868, and has remained in use to this day.

== Geography ==
Araxa is bordered by the neighboring municipalities of Perdizes to the north and northwest, Ibiá to the east, Tapira to the south, and Sacramento to the southwest.

The elevation of the city center is 973 metres (3,192 ft). The highest point in the municipality is Serrra da Bocaina at 1,359 metres (4,459 ft), and the lowest point is the Capivara river at 910 metres (2,990 ft). In 2004 the annual average temperature was 20.98 °C (69.76 °F), and the annual rainfall was 1,905 millimetres (75.0 in).

=== Climate ===
Araxá experiences a tropical savanna climate (Köppen: Aw) with warm temperatures and distinct wet and dry seasons.

The city experiences a wet season from November to April. The dry season extends from May to September, and experiences cooler temperatures than the wet season.

Climate data for Araxá (1991–2020 normals, extremes 1948–present)
Month	Jan	Feb	Mar	Apr	May	Jun	Jul	Aug	Sep	Oct	Nov	Dec	Year
Record high °C (°F)	34.9 (94.8)	35.2 (95.4)	34.3 (93.7)	32.4 (90.3)	31.1 (88.0)	30.1 (86.2)	31.5 (88.7)	33.5 (92.3)	36.4 (97.5)	37.2 (99.0)	34.7 (94.5)	34.3 (93.7)	37.2 (99.0)
Mean daily maximum °C (°F)	28.3 (82.9)	28.8 (83.8)	28.1 (82.6)	27.8 (82.0)	26.0 (78.8)	25.3 (77.5)	25.5 (77.9)	27.6 (81.7)	29.0 (84.2)	29.4 (84.9)	27.9 (82.2)	28.1 (82.6)	27.7 (81.9)
Daily mean °C (°F)	22.6 (72.7)	22.7 (72.9)	22.2 (72.0)	21.6 (70.9)	19.6 (67.3)	18.7 (65.7)	18.7 (65.7)	20.3 (68.5)	21.9 (71.4)	22.8 (73.0)	22.1 (71.8)	22.3 (72.1)	21.3 (70.3)
Mean daily minimum °C (°F)	19.0 (66.2)	18.9 (66.0)	18.6 (65.5)	17.6 (63.7)	15.1 (59.2)	14.3 (57.7)	14.1 (57.4)	15.2 (59.4)	17.0 (62.6)	18.3 (64.9)	18.2 (64.8)	18.7 (65.7)	17.1 (62.8)
Record low °C (°F)	9.7 (49.5)	10.9 (51.6)	10.5 (50.9)	5.4 (41.7)	2.1 (35.8)	0.5 (32.9)	1.6 (34.9)	4.5 (40.1)	8.1 (46.6)	7.9 (46.2)	7.2 (45.0)	8.6 (47.5)	0.5 (32.9)
Average precipitation mm (inches)	294.0 (11.57)	227.1 (8.94)	206.8 (8.14)	80.7 (3.18)	48.6 (1.91)	17.0 (0.67)	7.0 (0.28)	11.8 (0.46)	60.6 (2.39)	118.0 (4.65)	210.3 (8.28)	285.5 (11.24)	1,567.4 (61.71)
Average precipitation days (≥ 1.0 mm)	16.8	13.7	14.2	7.4	3.7	1.8	1.2	1.5	5.4	9.3	14.0	18.2	107.2
Average relative humidity (%)	79.3	77.7	79.3	75.6	72.9	69.6	63.6	57.5	59.6	67.0	76.6	80.4	71.6
Average dew point °C (°F)	19.1 (66.4)	19.0 (66.2)	18.9 (66.0)	17.8 (64.0)	15.2 (59.4)	13.8 (56.8)	12.5 (54.5)	12.3 (54.1)	14.1 (57.4)	16.6 (61.9)	18.2 (64.8)	19.1 (66.4)	16.4 (61.5)
Mean monthly sunshine hours	156.7	177.1	180.1	220.2	224.1	229.0	250.3	264.2	219.5	206.2	168.1	149.2	2,444.7
Source 1: NOAA
Source 2: National Institute of Meteorology (INMET) (temperature records: 01/01/1948-31/12/1950, 02/03/1971–present)

== Demographics ==
Historical population
Year	Pop.	±%
1970	35,676	—
1980	53,404	+49.7%
1991	65,911	+23.4%
2000	78,997	+19.9%
2010	93,071	+17.8%
2020	107,337	+15.3%
Source: IBGE

At the start of the 21st century, the municipality's population was 78,997 in 2000 and increased to 93,071 by 2010. According to the 2022 Brazilian census, the population grew to 111,691, marking an increase of approximately 19.9%.

=== Ethnic composition ===
Race/Skin color	Percentage	Number
White	50.18%	56,048
Pardo (Mixed-race)	38.71%	43,239
Black	10.78%	12,042
Asian	0.25%	283
Indigenous	0.07%	77

Source: IBGE 2022

== Transport ==
Araxá is served by Romeu Zema Airport (IATA: AAX, ICAO: SBAX), located 4 km from the city center.

The city's railway station was inaugurated in 1926 by Estrada de Ferro Oeste de Minas (EFOM). The branch line now serves for only cargo transport and connects the city with the municipalities of Ibiá and Uberaba. Passenger rail services were discontinued in 1979.

The municipality is connected by federal and state highways:

- BR 262 – Belo Horizonte/Vitória/Corumbá
- MG 428 – Rifaina/Franca
- BR 452 – Uberlândia/Tupaciguara

=== Distances to other cities ===
- Divinópolis: 284 kilometres (176 mi)
- Franca: 169 kilometres (105 mi)
- Belo Horizonte: 375 kilometres (233 mi)
- Brasília: 600 kilometres (370 mi)
- Rio de Janeiro: 848 kilometres (527 mi)
- São Paulo: 549 kilometres (341 mi)
- Uberaba: 117 kilometres (73 mi)
- Uberlândia: 178 kilometres (111 mi)

== Economic activities ==
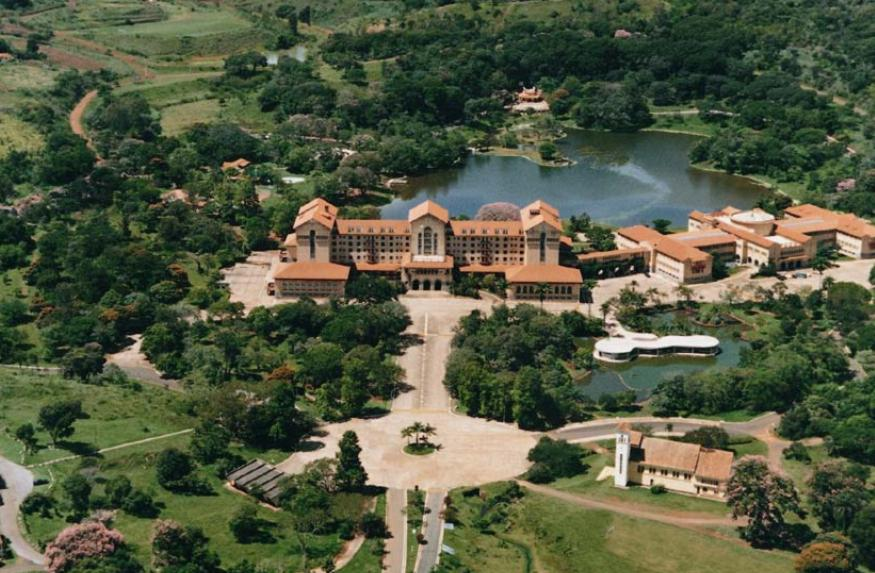
The Grande Hotel Termas de Araxá, located in the Barreiro Complex.

The economy is based on tourism, services, mining, industry, and some agriculture.

Araxá is famous in Brazil for its spa with medicinal mud and mineral waters. One of Brazil's most emblematic hotels, the Grande Hotel, is the center of attraction. Opened in 1944 by governor Benedito Valadares and President Vargas, the Hotel initiated an era of splendor to Araxá and the inland region of the state. It was the stage for huge social, political and cultural events. Overall, the city's hotel sector has 24 establishments offering 2,708 beds (2004). One of Brazil's most famous soap operas, Dona Beija, loosely based on the life of a legendary historic character of the city, was filmed here.

In addition to tourism, the city has a niobium mine. That metal is used in special steels and alloys for jet engine components, rocket sub-assemblies, and heat-resisting and combustion equipment. Reserves are about 460 million tons, sufficient to satisfy current world demand for about 500 years. The largest enterprise in this sector is CBMM—Companhia Brasileira de Metalurgia e Mineração.

Araxá is also a major producer of phosphate concentrate, essential for the production of fertilizers. The most important company in this sector is Vale Fertilizantes S.A., which was acquired by The Mosaic Company in 2018, and operates the largest single superphosphate production plant in Brazil.

In 2005, Araxá recorded a GDP of 1.439 billion Brazilian reais, generated almost equally by the services and industry sectors. During the same period, the workforce included 2,865 employees in industry, 1,478 in construction, 7,636 in commerce, 1,296 in restaurants and hotels, and 2,691 in public administration. The municipality contained 405 rural properties covering a total of 68,000 hectares (170,000 acres). Approximately 1,500 individuals were employed in agriculture. The livestock population comprised 65,000 head of cattle, primarily used for dairy production, with an estimated daily output of 500,000 litres (130,000 US gallons) in 2004. In addition, there was significant production of poultry and swine, and 22 producers of cachaça were registered in 2004. The main agricultural crops included coffee, corn, and soybeans. As of 2021, Araxá reported a GDP of 8.951 billion Brazilian reais, ranking 163rd in Brazil and a GDP per capita of R$ 82.570,25.

== Health and education ==
In the health sector there were 17 health clinics and 4 hospitals with 244 beds (2005). There were also 6 clinical analysis laboratories and 34 pharmacies. Two of the hospitals were private, and two were philanthropic. The educational needs of 10,500 students were met by 33 primary schools, 11 middle schools, and 40 pre-primary schools. In higher education, there were two institutions: Centro Universitário Planalto de Araxá, and, Universidade do Triângulo Mineiro (UNIT).

In 2004, the healthcare statistics indicated a ratio of one doctor for every 598 inhabitants and an availability of 3.5 hospital beds per 1,000 inhabitants. The infant mortality rate stood at 8.70 deaths per 1,000 live births in the same year, significantly lower than both the state and national averages. For comparison, the infant mortality rate was recorded at 20.80 deaths per 1,000 live births in the year 2000.

- Municipal Human Development Index: 0.799 (2000)
- State ranking: 40 out of 853 municipalities as of 2000
- National ranking: 579 out of 5,138 municipalities as of 2000
- Literacy rate: 93%
- Life expectancy: 70 (average of males and females)

In 2023, Araxá ranked 3rd in Minas Gerais and 38th in Brazil for access to education. In the same year, there were 38 schools in the city serving 13,487 elementary school students and 14 schools educating 4,182 high school students.

== See also ==
- List of municipalities in Minas Gerais
