= Tapira, Minas Gerais =

Town and municipality in the state of Minas Gerais, Brazil

Coordinates: 19°55′19″S 46°49′22″W

- Municipality
- Interactive map of Tapira, Minas Gerais
- Country: Brazil
- State: Minas Gerais
- Region: Southeast
- Time zone: UTC−3 (BRT)

Location of Tapira on a map of the state of Minas Gerais

Tapira is a Brazilian municipality located in the west of the state of Minas Gerais. Its population as of 2020 was 4,832 people living in a total area of 1,180 km^{2}. The city belongs to the meso-region of Triângulo Mineiro and Alto Paranaíba and to the micro-region of Araxá. It became a municipality in 1963.

== Geography ==
The city center of Tapira is located at an elevation of 907 meters, between the Ribeirão do Inferno and the Rio das Velhas valley. Neighboring municipalities are: Araxá (N), Ibiá (NE), São Roque de Minas (S and SE), and Sacramento (W).

=== Communications and distances ===
Tapira is connected to Araxá by national highway BR-146 and state highway MG-428. The nearest railroad station is in Araxá.

Other distances (in km.)

- Uberaba: 167
- Araxá: 60
- Belo Horizonte: 400

== Economic activities ==
Mining of phosphate is the most important economic activity. The GDP in 2005 was approximately R$162 million, with 12 million reais from taxes, 28 million reais from services, 98 million reais from industry, and 23 million reais from agriculture. There were 272 rural producers on 163,000 hectares of land. 31 farms had tractors (2006). Approximately 800 persons were dependent on agriculture. The main crops are coffee, potatoes, rice, soybeans, beans, and corn. There were 36,000 head of cattle (2006), most of which were raised for milk and cheese production.

There was 1 bank (2007) and 470 automobiles (2007), giving a ratio of 7 inhabitants per automobile.

Working population

- Workers in mining: 587
- Workers in construction: 586
- Workers in food and lodging: 442

== Health and education ==
In the health sector there were 3 public health clinics (2005). Patients with more serious health conditions are transported to Araxá or to Uberaba, which are connected by good roads. Educational needs of 800 students were met by 3 primary schools, 1 middle school, and 1 pre-primary school.

- Municipal Human Development Index: 0.780 (2000)
- State ranking: 113 out of 853 municipalities as of 2000
- National ranking: 1053 out of 5,138 municipalities as of 2000
- Literacy rate: 88%
- Life expectancy: 74 (average of males and females)

In 2000 the per capita monthly income of R$240.00 was below the state and national average of R$276.00 and R$297.00 respectively.

The highest ranking municipality in Minas Gerais in 2000 was Poços de Caldas with 0.841, while the lowest was Setubinha with 0.568. Nationally the highest was São Caetano do Sul in São Paulo with 0.919, while the lowest was Setubinha. In more recent statistics (considering 5,507 municipalities) Manari in the state of Pernambuco has the lowest rating in the country—0,467—putting it in last place.

== See also ==
- List of municipalities in Minas Gerais
