= Mococa =

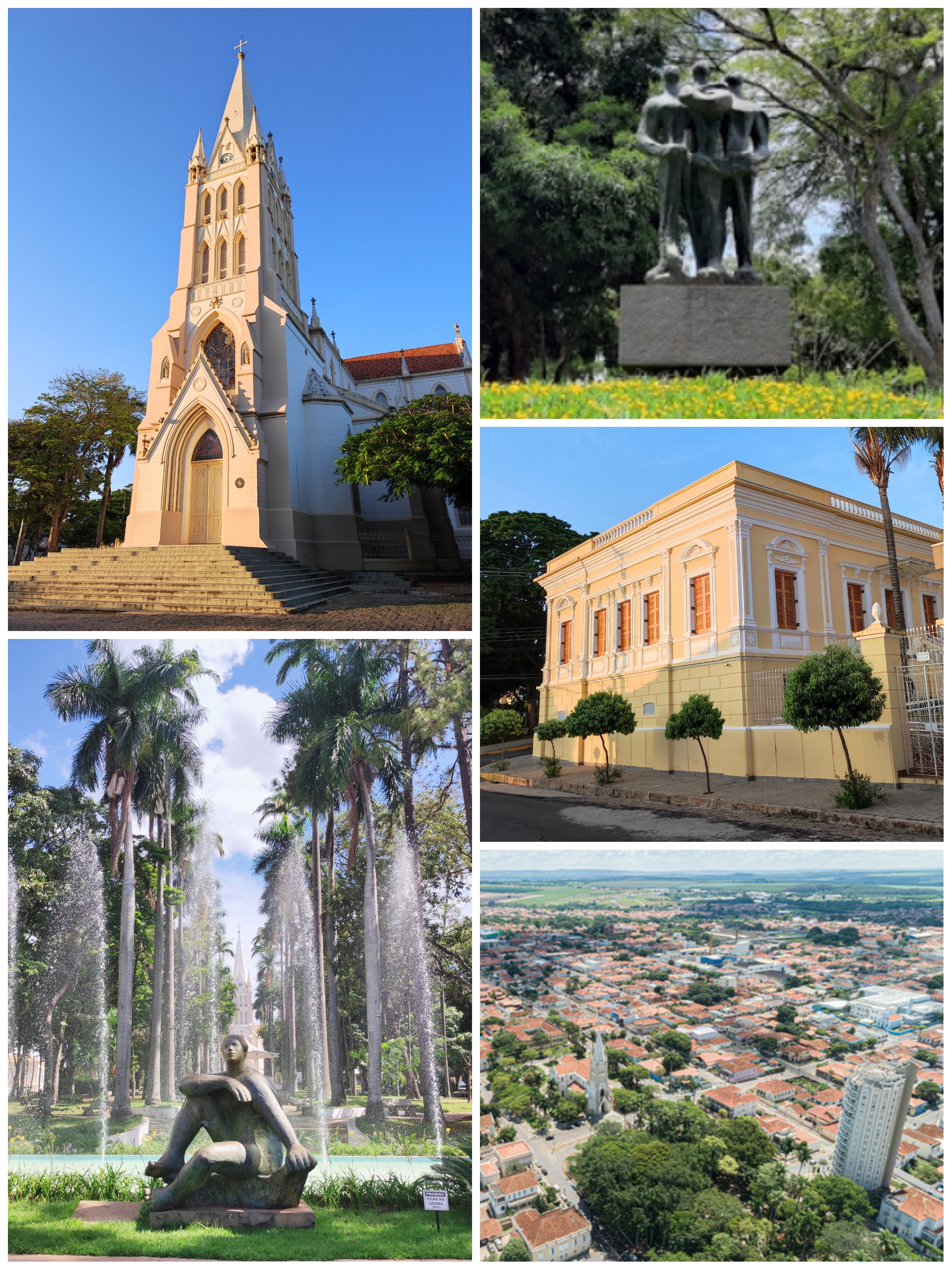

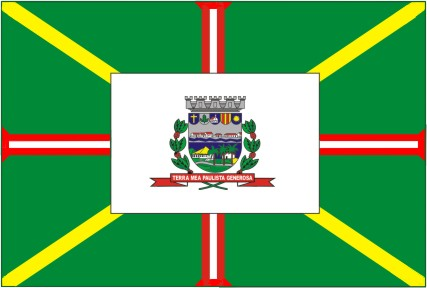
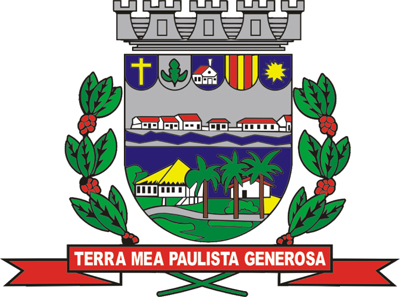
- Flag Coat of arms

- Coordinates: 21°28′04″S 47°00′17″W
- Country: Brazil
- Region: Southeast
- State: São Paulo

Area
  - Total: 856.39 km^{2} (330.65 sq mi)
- Elevation: 645 m (2,116 ft)

Population (2013)
  - Total: 80,629
- Time zone: UTC-3 (UTC-3)
  - Summer (DST): UTC-2 (UTC-2)
- Website: www.mococa.sp.gov.br

Mococa Portuguese pronunciation: [moˈkɔkɐ] is a municipality in the state of São Paulo in Brazil. The population is 68,980 (2020 est.) in an area of 855 km^{2} (330 sq mi). The elevation is 645 m.

The local government is made up of a mayor (in Brazil, Prefeito) and a municipal council (in Brazil, Câmara Municipal.) The current mayor is Eduardo Ribeiro Barison, from the PSD, who was re-elected in the 2024 municipal elections.

== Demography ==
Total Population: 67,681 (IBGE/2022 est.)

- Urban: 99%
- Rural: 1%
- Men: 49%
- Women: 51%

Population density (inhab./km²): 79.14

=== Ethnicities ===
Cor/Raça	Percentagem
White	65,9%
Black	5,5%
Brown	28,4%
Asian	0,2%

Source: Censo 2022

=== Immigration ===
After the abolition of slavery in 1888, Mococa began to receive a large number of immigrants to work on the coffee plantations. Among the immigrants, the majority were Italians, numbering between 9,000 and 10,000, coming mainly from the regions of Lombardy, Veneto, Lazio, Campania and Sicily. But there were also Germans, mainly from the Bavaria region, Austrians, Portuguese; Spanish from Andalusia and Galicia and, to a lesser extent, Lebanese, among others. The current population is the result of the miscegenation of these immigrants; it is estimated that the majority have at least one Italian ancestor.

== Media ==
In telecommunications, the city was served by Companhia Telefônica Brasileira until 1973, when it began to be served by Telecomunicações de São Paulo. In July 1998, this company was acquired by Telefónica, which adopted the Vivo brand in 2012.

The company is currently an operator of cell phones, fixed lines, internet (fiber optics/4G) and television (satellite and cable).

== Climate ==
Climate data for Mococa, elevation 662 m (2,172 ft), (1993–2020)
Month	Jan	Feb	Mar	Apr	May	Jun	Jul	Aug	Sep	Oct	Nov	Dec	Year
Mean daily maximum °C (°F)	29.8 (85.6)	30.3 (86.5)	29.9 (85.8)	29.0 (84.2)	26.3 (79.3)	26.0 (78.8)	26.6 (79.9)	28.6 (83.5)	30.3 (86.5)	30.8 (87.4)	29.8 (85.6)	29.9 (85.8)	28.9 (84.1)
Daily mean °C (°F)	24.8 (76.6)	25.0 (77.0)	24.5 (76.1)	23.1 (73.6)	20.2 (68.4)	19.6 (67.3)	19.7 (67.5)	21.2 (70.2)	23.3 (73.9)	24.4 (75.9)	24.3 (75.7)	24.8 (76.6)	22.9 (73.2)
Mean daily minimum °C (°F)	19.8 (67.6)	19.6 (67.3)	19.2 (66.6)	17.1 (62.8)	14.0 (57.2)	13.2 (55.8)	12.8 (55.0)	13.8 (56.8)	16.4 (61.5)	18.0 (64.4)	18.8 (65.8)	19.6 (67.3)	16.9 (62.3)
Average precipitation mm (inches)	290.7 (11.44)	193.1 (7.60)	166.6 (6.56)	86.5 (3.41)	64.2 (2.53)	34.6 (1.36)	16.2 (0.64)	17.5 (0.69)	60.5 (2.38)	126.4 (4.98)	170.6 (6.72)	258.6 (10.18)	1,485.5 (58.49)
Source: Centro Integrado de Informações Agrometeorológicas

== See also ==
- List of municipalities in São Paulo
- Interior of São Paulo
