= Cornish symbols =

Duchy and County symbols of Cornwall
- Flag of Cornwall

- Coat of arms of Cornwall
- Anthem: Trelawny
- Language: Cornish

Living insignia
- Bird: Chough
- Fish: Pilchard
- Flower: Broom; Furze (gorse); Rhododendron; Cornish heath
- Tree: Cornish Oak

Inanimate insignia
- Colours: Black; Old Gold; White; Blood Red
- Costume: Cornish kilts and tartans
- Instrument: Cornish bagpipes
- Sport: Cornish Pilot Gigs; Cornish Flashboats; Cornish Hurling; Cornish Wrestling

Standard of the Duke of Cornwall
- Use: Personal Standard of the Duke of Cornwall
- Design: Sable; 15 Bezants Or Five, Four, Three, Two, One.

Coat of Arms of the Diocese of Truro
- Armiger: Diocese of Truro
- Shield: Argent, on a saltire gules, a key, ward upward, in bend, surmounted by a sword, hilt upward, in bend sinister, both or. In base, a fleur de lys sable. The whole within a bordure sable, fifteen bezants.
- Use: For all churches in the Diocese and the Bishop of Truro

Many different symbols are associated with Cornwall, a region which has disputed constitutional status within the United Kingdom (confer the Constitutional status of Cornwall). Saint Piran's Flag, a white cross on a black background is often seen in Cornwall. The Duchy of Cornwall shield of 15 gold bezants on a black field is also used. Because of these two symbols black, white and gold are considered colours symbolic of Cornwall.

Saint Piran's Flag is the flag of Cornwall. It was first described as the Standard of Cornwall in 1838. It has since been used by Cornish people as a symbol of identity.

== Chough ==
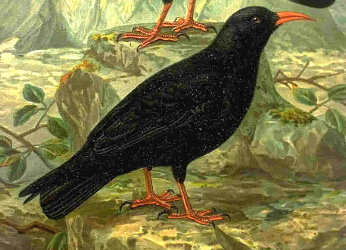
Cornish chough

The chough (in Cornish = palores) is also used as a symbol of Cornwall. In Cornish poetry the chough is used to symbolise the spirit of Cornwall. Also there is a Cornish belief that King Arthur lives in the form of a chough. "Chough" was also used as a nickname for Cornish people.

== Anvil ==
An anvil is sometimes used to symbolise Cornish nationalism, particularly in its more extreme forms. This is a reference to 'Michael An Gof', 'the smith', a leader of the Cornish Rebellion of 1497.

== Fish, tin, and copper ==
Fish, tin, and copper together are used as they show the 'traditional' three main industries of Cornwall. Tin has a special place in the Cornish culture, the 'Stannary Parliament' and 'Cornish pennies' are a testament to the former power of the Cornish tin industry. Cornish tin is highly prized for jewellery, often of mine engines or Celtic designs.

== Flowers ==
Several flowers and plants have been described as the Cornish national flower. These include broom, furze (gorse), rhododendron, and Cornish heath.

Although Cornwall has no official flower many people favour the Cornish heath (Erica vagans). In recent years daffodils have been popular on the annual Saint Piran's day march on Perran sands although they are donated by a local daffodil grower and it is already considered to be the National flower of Wales.

As part of a 2002 marketing campaign, the plant conservation charity Plantlife chose Thrift (Armeria maritima) as the "county flower" of the Isles of Scilly.

== Trees ==
The Cornish national tree is the sessile oak, known in Cornwall as the Cornish oak.

== Food ==
The Cornish national dish is the Cornish pasty.

== Tartans ==
For further reading consult; Cornish kilts and tartans
For complete list of tartans consult; List of tartans

National tartans
Image	Name	Notes
	Cornish National tartan	STA no. 1567
	Cornish Hunting tartan	STA no. 1568
	Cornish Flag tartan	STA no. 1618
	St Piran's Dress tartan	STA no. 1685
	Cornish National Day tartan	STA no. 1262

== Diocese of Truro ==
The arms of the Diocese of Truro include a saltire gules on which are a crossed sword and key: below this is a fleur de lys sable, all surrounded by a border sable charged with 15 bezants or. The saltire is the cross of St Patrick, taken to be the emblem of the Celtic church; the sword and key are emblems of St Peter and Paul, the patrons of Exeter Cathedral, and the fleur de lys represents St Mary, patron of the cathedral. The border is derived from the arms of the Duchy of Cornwall. They were designed by the College of Heralds in 1877 and are blazoned thus:

"Argent, on a saltire gules, a key, ward upward, in bend, surmounted by a sword, hilt upward, in bend sinister, both or. In base, a fleur de lys sable. The whole within a bordure sable, fifteen bezants. Ensigned with a mitre."

== Cornwall, Ontario ==
Flag of Cornwall, Ontario

The original settlement of colonial Cornwall was established in 1784, by disbanded Loyalist soldiers, their families and other United Empire Loyalists—primarily from New York—following the 1776 American Revolution. The settlement they founded was later renamed Cornwall after the Duke of Cornwall, Prince George, and became one of the first incorporated municipalities in the British colony of Upper Canada in 1834.

== Cornwall County, Jamaica ==
Jamaica's three counties were established in 1758 to facilitate the holding of courts along the lines of the British County court system. Cornwall, the westernmost, was named after the westernmost county of England. Savanna-la-Mar was its county town.

== Gallery ==
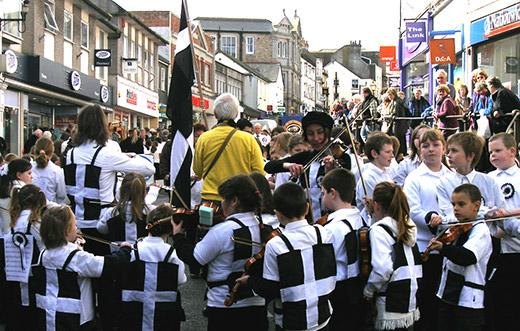
Celebrating Saint Piran's Day (note draped flags)

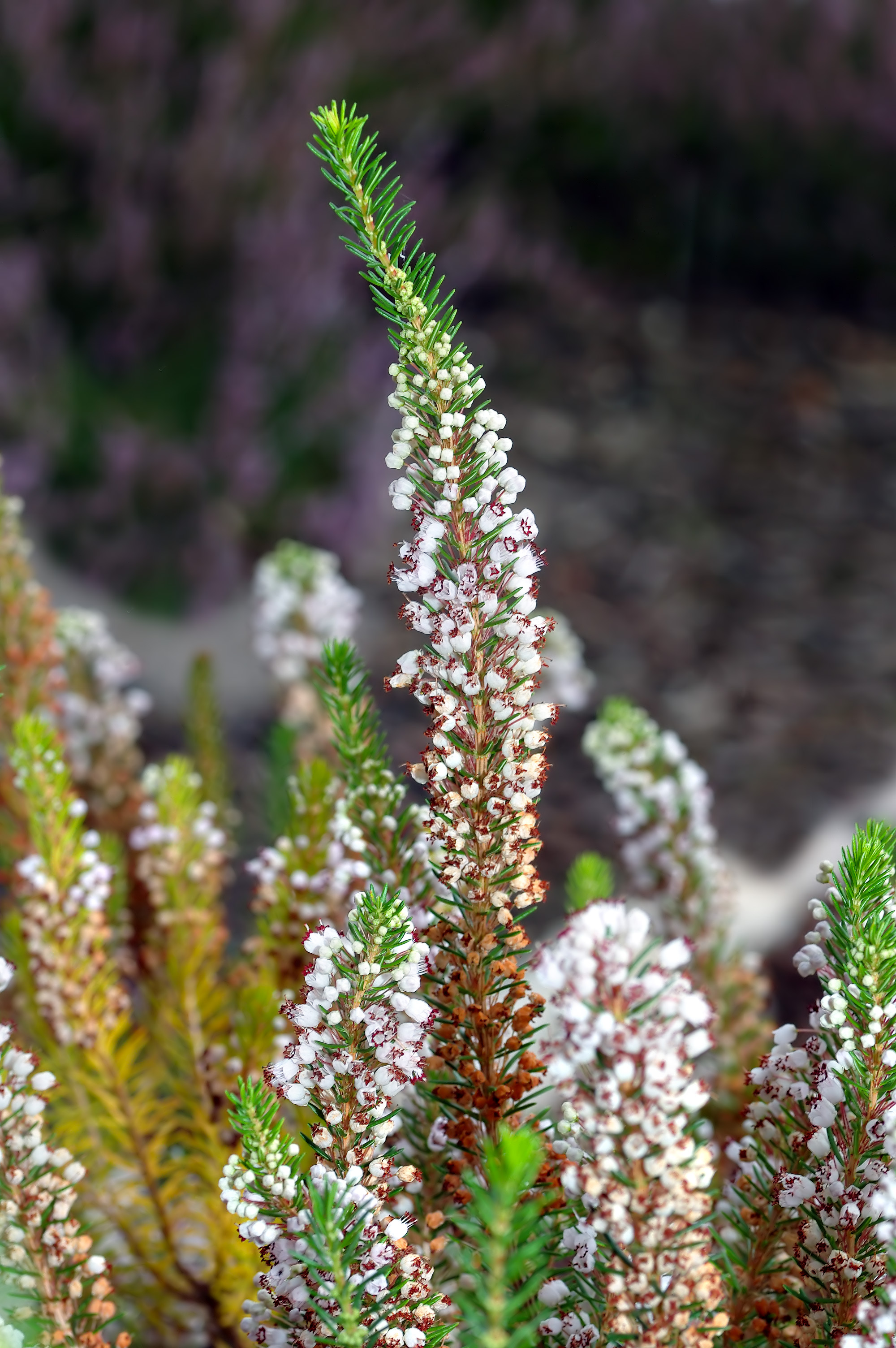
Cornish heath in close-up

The unofficial 'Cornish ensign' is another flag that is sometimes used to represent the regional identity of Cornwall.

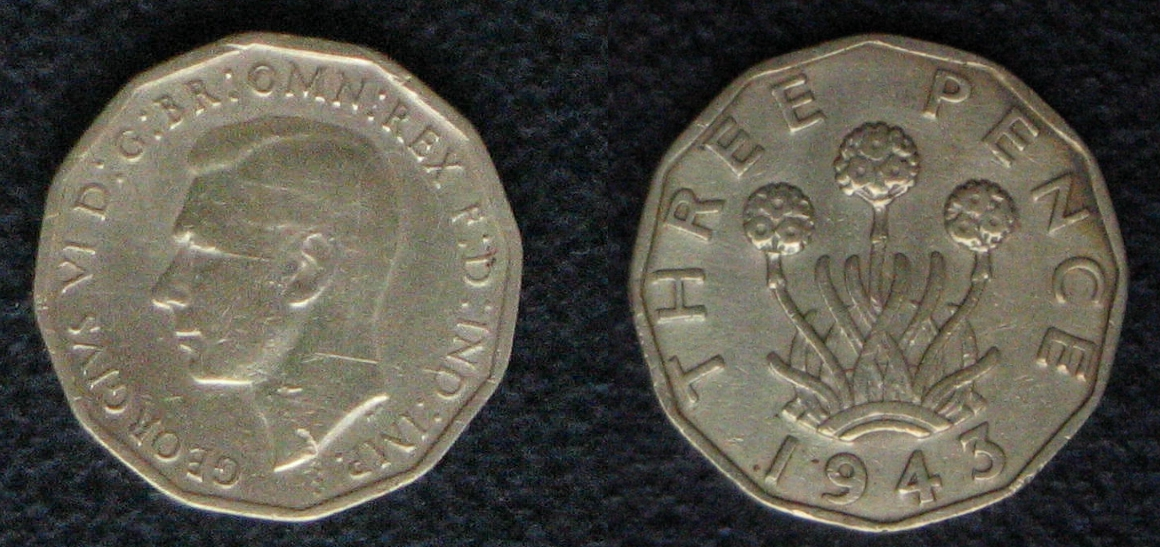
A 1943 threepenny bit (reverse portrays Thrift)

== See also ==
- "Black and Gold" (song)
- List of Cornish flags
