= List of flags with Christian symbolism =

This list exclusively includes the official flags of administrative bodies or territorial jurisdictions, representing current or former territories, states, counties, and provinces.

== List ==
Flag	Entity	Dates used	Religious characteristics
(Alabama)	Alabama	1895–present	A crimson cross of St. Andrew
(Åland)	Åland	1954–present	Nordic Cross Flag
Alberta	Alberta	1968–present	Saint George's Cross
(Andorra)	Andorra	1866–present	Includes a bishop's mitre, representing the Bishop of Urgell
Anguilla	Anguilla	1999–present	Crosses of St. George, St. Andrew and St. Patrick
(Argentina)	Argentina	1816–present	The colors light blue and white represent the mantle of the Virgin Mary (Our Lady of Luján)
(Arkhangelsk Oblast)	Arkhangelsk Oblast	2009–present	The Archangel Michael in the act of defeating the Devil, and a cross of St. Andrew
Armenia	Armenia	1990–present	The color red emblematizes the maintenance of the Christian faith
Ascension Island	Ascension Island	2013–present	Crosses of St. George, St. Andrew and St. Patrick
(Asturias)	Asturias	1990–present	Alpha and Omega and the Victory Cross
Australia	Australia	1903–present	Crosses of St. George, St. Andrew and St. Patrick
(Azores)	Azores	1979–present	Compound cross of five quinas, each one charged with five saltire-arranged bezants, representing the five wounds of Christ
Basque Country (autonomous community)	Basque Country	1978–present	Christian cross representing Catholic devotion
Baton Rouge, Louisiana	Baton Rouge	1995–present	Crosses of St. George and St. Andrew
Bermuda	Bermuda	1999–present	Crosses of St. George, St. Andrew and St. Patrick
British Ceylon	British Ceylon	1875–1948	Crosses of St. George, St. Andrew and St. Patrick
British Columbia	British Columbia	1960–present	Crosses of St. George, St. Andrew and St. Patrick
British Honduras	British Honduras	1919–1981	Crosses of St. George, St. Andrew and St. Patrick
British Hong Kong	British Hong Kong	1871–1997	Crosses of St. George, St. Andrew and St. Patrick
British Indian Ocean Territory	British Indian Ocean Territory	1990–present	Crosses of St. George, St. Andrew and St. Patrick
British Virgin Islands	British Virgin Islands	1999–present	Crosses of St. George, St. Andrew and St. Patrick, as well as Saint Ursula
British Weihaiwei	British Weihaiwei	1903–1930	Crosses of St. George, St. Andrew and St. Patrick
Burundi	Burundi	1967–present	Saint Andrew's Cross
(Calabria)	Calabria	1992–present	Teutonic and Byzantine crosses
Cayman Islands	Cayman Islands	1999–present	Crosses of St. George, St. Andrew and St. Patrick
City of London	City of London	1381–present	Saint George's Cross
Colonial Nigeria	Colonial Nigera	1954–1960	Crosses of St. George, St. Andrew and St. Patrick
(Confederate States of America)	Confederate States of America	1865	Saint Andrew's Cross
Cook Islands	Cook Islands	1979–present	Crosses of St. George, St. Andrew and St. Patrick
Cornwall	Cornwall	19th century–present	Saint Piran's Cross
(Denmark)	Denmark	1219–present	Nordic Cross Flag
Dominica	Dominica	1978–present	The cross represents the Trinity
(Dominican Republic)	Dominican Republic	1863–present	A Bible, a cross and the color white stands for salvation
East Africa Protectorate	East Africa Protectorate	1895–1921	Crosses of St. George, St. Andrew and St. Patrick
East India Company	East India Company	1801-1858	Crosses of St. George, St. Andrew and St. Patrick
(Ethiopia)	Ethiopian Empire	1897–1974	Christian cross
El Salvador	El Salvador	1912–present	Dios, Unión, Libertad (God, Union, Liberty)
England	England	–present	Saint George's Cross
Falkland Islands	Falkland Islands	1999–present	Crosses of St. George, St. Andrew and St. Patrick
(Faroe Islands)	Faroe Islands	1940–present	Nordic Cross Flag
Fiji	Fiji	1970–present	Crosses of St. George, St. Andrew, St. Patrick and a dove
(Finland)	Finland	1918–present	Nordic Cross Flag
(Florida)	Florida	1900–present	St. Andrews cross and Motto (In God We Trust)
(Galicia (Spain))	Galicia	1984–present	A chalice joined to a silver host
(Georgia (country))	Georgia	2004–present	Jerusalem cross
(Greece)	Greece	1978–present	Greek cross symbolizes Greek Orthodoxy
(Guernsey)	Guernsey	1985–present	Saint George's Cross, Norman cross
Hawaii	Hawaii	1845–present	Crosses of St. George, St. Andrew and St. Patrick
Hungary	Kingdom of Hungary/Hungary (state flag)	1848-present	Patriarchal cross, Crown of Saint Stephen
(Iceland)	Iceland	1944–present	Nordic Cross Flag
Isles of Scilly	Isles of Scilly	2002–present	Scillonian Cross, based on Saint Piran's Cross
Republic of Ireland	Ireland	1922–present	The green signifies the Catholic majority. The orange signifies the Protestant minority
(Ingria)	Ingria	1919–present	Nordic Cross Flag
(Italy)	Kingdom of Italy	1861–1946	Christian cross
Jersey	Jersey	1981–present	Saltire
(Kingdom of Jerusalem)	Kingdom of Jerusalem	1162–1291	Jerusalem cross
(Lebanon)	Lebanon	1943–present	The cedar of Lebanon is an important biblical historical symbol (Cedars of God).
Liechtenstein	Liechtenstein	1982–present	Christian cross
(Liguria)	Liguria	1997–present	Saint George's Cross
(Louisiana)	Louisiana	1912–present	A pelican of piety
(Madeira)	Madeira	1978–present	Order of Christ Cross
(Malta)	Malta	1964–present	George Cross
Manitoba	Manitoba	1965–present	Crosses of St. George, St. Andrew and St. Patrick
Mississippi	Mississippi	2021–present	Motto (In God We Trust)
Moldova	Moldova	1990–present	Orthodox Cross
Montenegro	Montenegro	2004–present	Orthodox Cross.
Montserrat	Montserrat	1960–present	Irish figure Erin holding a Christian cross
(Moscow Oblast)	Moscow Oblast	1999–present	Orthodox Cross
New South Wales	New South Wales	1876–present	Crosses of St. George, St. Andrew and St. Patrick
New Zealand	New Zealand	1902–present	Crosses of St. George, St. Andrew and St. Patrick
Niue	Niue	1902–present	Crosses of St. George, St. Andrew and St. Patrick
Northern Ireland	Northern Ireland	1924-1973	Saint George's Cross
(Norway)	Norway	1821–present	Nordic Cross Flag
Nova Scotia	Nova Scotia	1929–present	Saint Andrew's Cross
Ontario	Ontario	1965–present	Crosses of St. George, St. Andrew and St. Patrick
(Sovereign Military Order of Malta)	Order of Malta	1259–present	Saint George's Cross
(Orenburg Oblast)	Orenburg Oblast	1996–present	Orthodox Cross
(Orkney)	Orkney	2007–present	Nordic Cross Flag
Pärnu	Pärnu	1934–present	Nordic Cross Flag
(Piedmont)	Piedmont	1995–present	Christian cross
Pitcairn Islands	Pitcairn Islands	1984–present	Crosses of St. George, St. Andrew and St. Patrick
(Portugal)	Portugal	1911–present	Compound cross of five quinas, each one charged with five saltire-arranged bezants, representing the five wounds of Christ
(Quebec)	Quebec	1948–present	Saint Michael's Cross, blue being the color of Saint Martin's cloak, Moreover, the flag reflects the arms of France, whose blue color and fleurs-de-lys are symbols of the Virgin Mary, who is traditionally depicted dressed in blue and wearing a crown of fleurs-de-lys.
Queensland	Queensland	1876–present	Crosses of St. George, St. Andrew and St. Patrick, Maltese cross
Saint Helena	Saint Helena	1984–present	Crosses of St. George, St. Andrew and St. Patrick
(San Marino)	San Marino	2011–present	Christian cross
(Sardinia)	Sardinia	1999–present	Saint George's Cross
(Scania)	Scania	1902–present	Nordic Cross Flag
Scotland	Scotland	1542–present	Saint Andrew's Cross
(Serbia)	Serbia	2004–present	Serbian cross symbolizes Serbian Orthodoxy
(Shetland)	Shetland	2005–present	Nordic Cross Flag
(Slovakia)	Slovakia	1992–present	Patriarchal cross
South Australia	South Australia	1904–present	Crosses of St. George, St. Andrew and St. Patrick
South Georgia and the South Sandwich Islands	South Georgia and the South Sandwich Islands	1999–present	Crosses of St. George, St. Andrew and St. Patrick
(Spain)	Spain	1981–present	Christian cross
(Sweden)	Sweden	1906–present	Nordic Cross Flag
(Switzerland)	Switzerland	1841–present	Greek cross
Tasmania	Tasmania	1876–present	Crosses of St. George, St. Andrew and St. Patrick
Tonga	Tonga	1875–present	The red field symbolizes the Blood of Christ, while the white canton symbolizes the purity of Jesus and contains a Greek cross, representing Christianity itself.
Tristan da Cunha	Tristan da Cunha	2002–present	Crosses of St. George, St. Andrew, St. Patrick and motto (Our faith is our strength)
Turks and Caicos Islands	Turks and Caicos Islands	1999–present	Crosses of St. George, St. Andrew and St. Patrick
Tuvalu	Tuvalu	1997–present	Crosses of St. George, St. Andrew and St. Patrick
Protectorate of Uganda	Uganda Protectorate	1914–1962	Crosses of St. George, St. Andrew and St. Patrick
United Kingdom	United Kingdom	1707–present	Crosses of St. George, St. Andrew and St. Patrick
(Vatican City)	Vatican City	1929–present	Crossed keys of Saint Peter and the Papal Tiara centered in the white band
Victoria (state)	Victoria	1877–present	Crosses of St. George, St. Andrew and St. Patrick
Western Australia	Western Australia	1953–present	Crosses of St. George, St. Andrew and St. Patrick
(Wilmington, Delaware)	Wilmington	1963–present	Nordic Cross Flag

== See also ==
- Religious symbolism
- History of Christian flags
- Religion in national symbols
