= Penzance (disambiguation) =

Penzance is a town in Cornwall.

Penzance may also refer to:

== Places ==
- Penzance, Saskatchewan, Canada

== Sport ==
- Penzance A.F.C., a football club
- Penzance Sailing Club
- Penzance RFC, a rugby club, 1876–1944

== Transport ==
- Penzance Heliport, Cornwall
- Penzance railway station, Cornwall
- Penzance TMD, a rail depot in Cornwall

British warships:

- HMS Penzance (M106), 1997–2024
- HMS Penzance (L28), 1930–1940

== People ==
- James Wilde, 1st Baron Penzance (1816–1899), British judge
