= Laity Moor =

Coordinates: 50.188°N 5.142°W

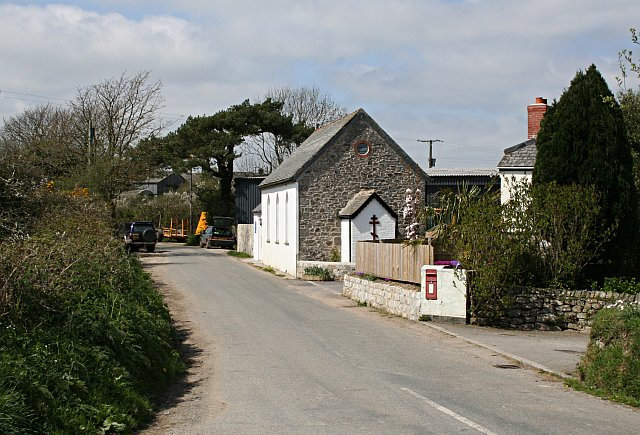
- Former Methodist chapel at Laity Moor

- Location within Cornwall
- OS grid reference: SW758367
- Civil parish: St Gluvias
- Unitary authority: Cornwall
- Ceremonial county: Cornwall
- Region: South West
- Country: England
- Sovereign state: United Kingdom
- Post town: Truro
- Postcode district: TR3

Laity Moor is a hamlet 2 miles (3.2 km) north-west of Penryn in Cornwall, England. The name derives from the Cornish "goon lety" meaning "dairy downs". (Laity is thought to mean "dairy", from "lait" meaning "milk", and "-ty", meaning "house".) The Laity family come from there. It is in the civil parish of St Gluvias.

The former Methodist chapel at Laity Moor has served as the Orthodox Church of Archangel Michael and Holy Piran since 1996.
