= Saint Piran =

Cornish abbot and saint

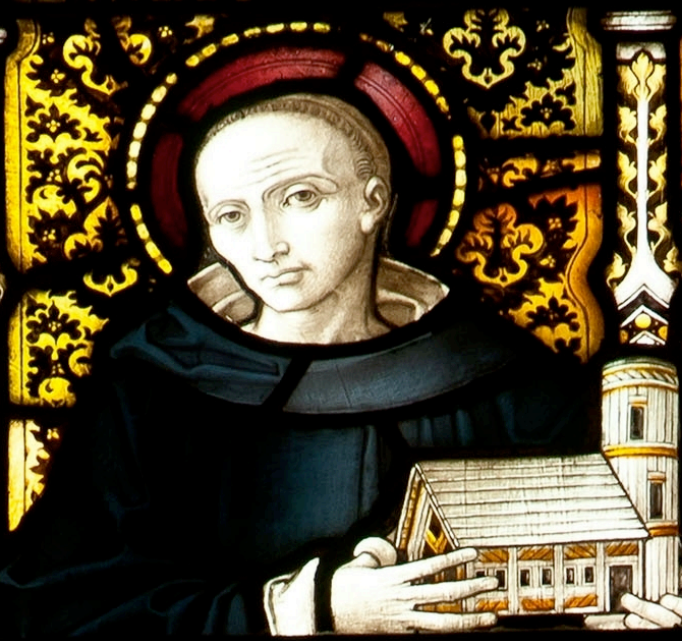
- Born: c. 5th century Unknown
- Died: c. 480; Perranzabuloe, Cornwall (possibly)
- Venerated in: Catholic Church; Eastern Orthodoxy; Anglican Communion
- Canonized: Pre-Congregation
- Major shrine: Perranzabuloe
- Feast: 5 March
- Patronage: Tinners; Cornwall

Piran or Pyran (Cornish: Peran; Latin: Piranus), died c. 480, was a 5th-century Cornish abbot and saint, possibly of Irish origin. He is the patron saint of tin-miners, and is also generally regarded as the patron saint of Cornwall, although Michael and Petroc also have some claim to this title. (Note: The cult of Saint Michael was largely due to the Norman Earls of Cornwall, while that of Saint Petroc was the most important in the Diocese of Cornwall since he was the founder of the monastery of Bodmin the most important in the diocese and, with St Germans, the seat of the bishops. He was the patron of the diocese and of Bodmin.) (Note: According to an article in the 1859 edition of the Ulster Journal of Archaeology: "...St. Ciaran, under the name Piran, [is the patron saint] of more than one church in Cornwall.")

The consensus of scholarship has identified the "Life" of Piran as a copy of that of the Irish saint Ciarán of Saigir with the names changed. (Note: Rev. Richard Stanton notes the following in his Menology of England and Wales (1892): "According to Lanigan (Hist., i., 22, and ii., 9), St. Piran is known in Ireland as Kieran of Saigir, and was a pupil of St. Finian in the sixth century. He is generally spoken of as Bishop of Ossory, but the Irish accounts do not mention his going to England."; "Queranus, mentioned by Whitford and Wilson on 9 Sep., and honoured in Scotland, is said by Forbes (Kal. of Scottish Saints, p. 435) to be St. Piran of Cornwall. ") (Note: "Piran or Kiaran (of Saighir)".) While Piran's origins are not certain, it is generally accepted that he was Irish, that he spent time in Wales and later was expelled from Ireland because of his influential preaching of the Gospel of Jesus Christ. According to tradition, he was thrown into the sea tied to a mill stone, but miraculously arrived on the shores of Cornwall where he built his tiny oratory and continued his work of evangelism and of founding communities.

Saint Piran's Flag, a white cross on a black background, is the county flag of Cornwall. Saint Piran's Day falls on 5 March.

== Life ==
Piran is the most famous of all the saints said to have come to Cornwall from Ireland. G. H. Doble thought that Piran was a Welshman from Glamorgan, citing the lost chapel once dedicated to him in Cardiff.

From medieval times, since Brittonic languages and Goidelic languages regularly alternate p and k sounds, he had become identified with the Irish saint Ciarán of Saighir who founded the monastery at Seir-Kieran in County Offaly. Joseph Loth has argued, on detailed philological grounds, that the names Piran and Ciarán could not possibly refer to the same person.

The fourteenth-century Life of Saint Piran, probably written at Exeter Cathedral, is a complete copy of an earlier Middle Irish life of Ciarán of Saighir, with different parentage and a different ending that takes into account Piran's works in Cornwall, and especially details of his death and the movements of his Cornish shrine; thus "excising the passages which speak of his burial at Saighir" (Doble).

Professor Nicholas Orme writes in his Churches of Medieval Exeter, that "it may well be that Piran was the inspiration for the Kerrian dedication (in Exeter), albeit believed (as Piran usually was) to be identical with Ciarán." Also, the saint of the church in Exeter was Keranus or Kyeranus [Queranus] in Latin documents, with Kerrian being the local vernacular pronunciation.

The St Piran Trust has undertaken research which suggests that Piran was either Ciarán of Saighir or a disciple, as indicated by James Brennan of Kilkenny and T. F. G. Dexter, whose thesis is held in the Cornwall Museum and Art Gallery.

The Celtic scholar Charles Plummer suggested that Piran might, instead, be identified with Ciarán of Clonmacnoise, who founded the monastery of Clonmacnoise also in County Offaly, but this is doubtful since this saint is believed to have died of yellow fever at the age of thirty-two and was buried at Clonmacnoise. His father is, however, sometimes said to have been a Cornishman. David Nash Ford accepts the Ciarán of Clonmacnoise identification, whilst further suggesting that Piran's father in the Exeter life, Domuel, be identified with Dywel fab Erbin, a fifth-century prince of Dumnonia (Devon and Cornwall).

5 March is the traditional feast day of both Saint Ciarán of Saighir and Saint Piran. (Note: "5 March.- St. Piran's day is a miners' holiday. St. Piran is the patron saint of "tinners," and is popularly supposed to have died drunk. (However, this appears to conflate Piran with St. Pyr of Caldey.)"As drunk as a Piraner" is a Cornish proverb.") However the Calendar of Launceston Church records an alternative date of 18 November for the latter. In Perranzabuloe parish Perran Feast is traditionally celebrated on the last Monday in October. On the previous Sunday there are services at the site of St Piran's Oratory and in the parish church of St Piran.

== Legends ==
Saint Piran's Flag consists of a white cross on a black field

- The Irish tied him to a mill-stone, rolled it over the edge of a cliff into a stormy sea, which immediately became calm, and the saint floated safely over the water to land upon the sandy beach of Perranzabuloe in Cornwall. His first disciples are said to have been a badger, a fox, and a boar.
- He landed in Cornwall, and there established himself as a hermit. His sanctity and his austerity won for him the veneration of all around, and the gift of miracles, with which he was favoured, brought many to seek his charitable aid.
- He was joined at Perranzabuloe by many of his Christian converts and together they founded the Abbey of Lanpiran, with Piran as abbot.
- Piran 'rediscovered' tin-smelting (tin had been smelted in Cornwall since before the Romans' arrival, but the methods had since been lost) when the tin in his black hearthstone, which was evidently a slab of tin-bearing ore, was smelted out of it and rose to the top in the form of a white cross (thus the image on the flag).

== Death and veneration ==
Coat of arms of Saint-Piran's family

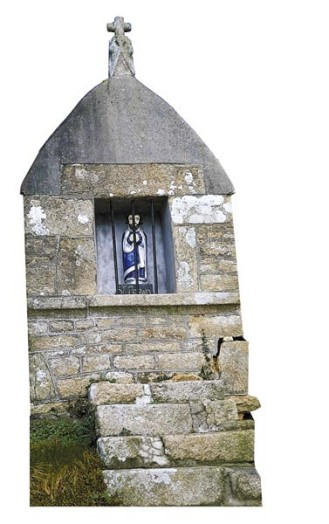
St Piran's Oratory at Trézilidé, Finistère

Piran was reportedly executed by Theodoric or Tador, King of Cornwall in 480, about the time of Vortigern (Usher's Prim. 869). It is also said that at his death, (Note: "At length, however, worn out with age and infirmity, St Piran called his followers around him, and, having addressed them for the last time, desired a grave to be prepared. He then took leave of them, and, descending into it with calmness, his spirit departed on the 5th day of March, about 480. He rests, continues an old narrative of his life, in Cornwall, on the shore of the Severn sea, fifteen miles from Petroc-stowe or Padstow, and twenty-five from Mousehole (two ancient harbours of Cornwall, the former on the north, and the latter on the south coast)." ("Severn sea" = Bristol channel, but now called Celtic sea.)) the remains of the Blessed Martin the Abbot which he had brought from Ireland were buried with him at Perranzabuloe.

His own remains were subsequently exhumed and redistributed to be venerated in various reliquaries. Exeter Cathedral was reputed to be the possessor of one of his arms, while according to an inventory, St Piran's Old Church, Perranzabuloe, had a reliquary containing his head and also a hearse in which his body was placed for processionals. In 1443, Cornish nobleman, Sir John Arundell bequeathed money in his will for the preservation of the head of St Piran in the chapel at Perranzabuloe.

The churches at Perranuthnoe and Perranarworthal were dedicated to Piran and holy wells at Perranwell and Probus, Cornwall are named after him. In Brittany St. Peran, Loperan and Saint-Perran are also named after him. The former Methodist chapel at Laity Moor has served as the Orthodox Church of Archangel Michael and Holy Piran since 1996.

The earliest documented link to the design of the St Piran's Flag with Piran is on the coat of arms of the de Saint-Péran or Saint-Pezran (pronounced Péran) family from Cornouaille in Brittany. The earliest evidence known comes from the 15th century, with the arms being De sable à la croix pattée d'argent. (a black shield with a white cross pattée).

Mount St. Piran is a mountain in Banff National Park near Lake Louise, Alberta, Canada, named after the saint. St Piran's crab, Clibanarius erythropus, was also named in his honour in 2016.

=== St Piran's Day ===
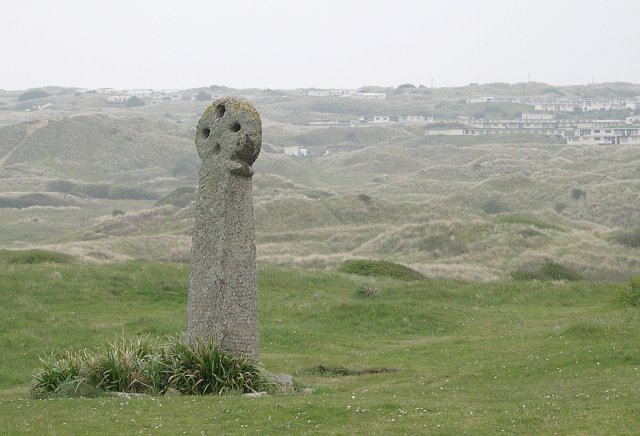
St Piran's Cross in the dunes at Perranzabuloe

St Piran's Day on 5 March is popular in Cornwall and the term 'Perrantide' has been coined to describe the week prior to this day. Many Cornish-themed events occur in the county and also in areas in which there is a large community descended from Cornish emigrants. The village of Perranporth ('Porthpyran' in Cornish) used to host the annual inter-Celtic festival of 'Lowender Peran', which was also named in honour of him. It is now hosted in Redruth.

One St Piran's Day event is the march across the dunes to St Piran's cross which hundreds of people attend, generally dressed in black, white and gold, and carrying the Cornish Flag. A play of the Life of St Piran, in Cornish, has been enacted since 2000 at the event. Daffodils are also carried and placed at the cross. Daffodils also feature in celebrations in Truro, most likely due to their 'gold' colour. Black, white and gold are colours associated with Cornwall due to St Piran's Flag (black and white), and the Duchy Shield (gold coins on black).

In 2006 Cornish MP Dan Rogerson asked the government to make 5 March a public holiday in Cornwall to recognise celebrations for St Piran's Day. In 2010, a short movie about St. Piran was made and premiered at the Heartland Film Festival.

== See also ==
- Perranzabuloe - St Piran's Oratory and Old Church
- St Piran Football League
- St Piran's (school)

== Sources ==
- Carter, Eileen (2001). In the Shadow of St Piran
- Doble, G. H. (1965). The Saints of Cornwall. Dean & Chapter of Truro.
- Farmer, David Hugh (2003). The Oxford Dictionary of Saints (5th ed.). Oxford: Oxford University Press. ISBN 978-0-19-860629-1.
- Loth, Joseph-Marie (1930). "Sur quelques victimes de l'hagio-onomastique en Cornwal : saint Piran, saint Keverne et saint Achebran". Comptes rendus des séances de l'Académie des Inscriptions et Belles-Lettres. 74 (1): 21–23. doi:10.3406/crai.1930.75832.
- Plummer, Charles (1922). Betha Naem nErenn
- Tomlin, E. W. F. (1982). In Search of St Piran: an account of his monastic foundation at Perranzabuloe, Cornwall
- Rev. Charles William Boase, M.A. (Fellow and Tutor of Exeter College, Oxford). PIRANUS, ST. In: William Smith and Henry Wace. A Dictionary of Christian Biography, Literature, Sects and Doctrines During the First Eight Centuries. Volume IV: N-Z. London: John Murray, Albemarle Street, 1887. pp. 404–405.
