= Kroaz Du =

Flag of Brittany

Kroaz du
- Proportion: 2:3
- Adopted: First attested in the 15th century; possibly earlier
- Design: A black cross on a white background, sometimes accompanied by one or more ermine spots

The Kroaz Du (Black Cross, French: Croix Noire) is a flag of Brittany, used as an emblem of the independent duchy in the late Middle Ages. In the Breton language, kroaz means cross and du means black.

== Origins ==
Banner attributed to Breton and French Knights at the Combat of the Thirty in 1351, during the Breton civil war.

A medieval version of the Kroaz Du

There is uncertainty about the chronology of its origins. It clearly evolved from the flags of the Crusaders and some evidence shows that the black and white colors were taken from the ermine spots that formed the coat of arms of the dukes of Brittany (adopted early in the 14th century and also used as a standard called the plain ermine flag).

It is widely known that the warriors of the First Crusade used the emblem of the red cross (later known as the St George's Cross). Banners with crosses of distinct colors by nation were first used by Crusaders from about 1188. However, very few Breton barons joined that Third Crusade, so it is more probable that the earliest Kroaz Du was given to Peter I, Duke of Brittany by Pope Gregory IX in 1236 or 1237.

== Late medieval usage ==
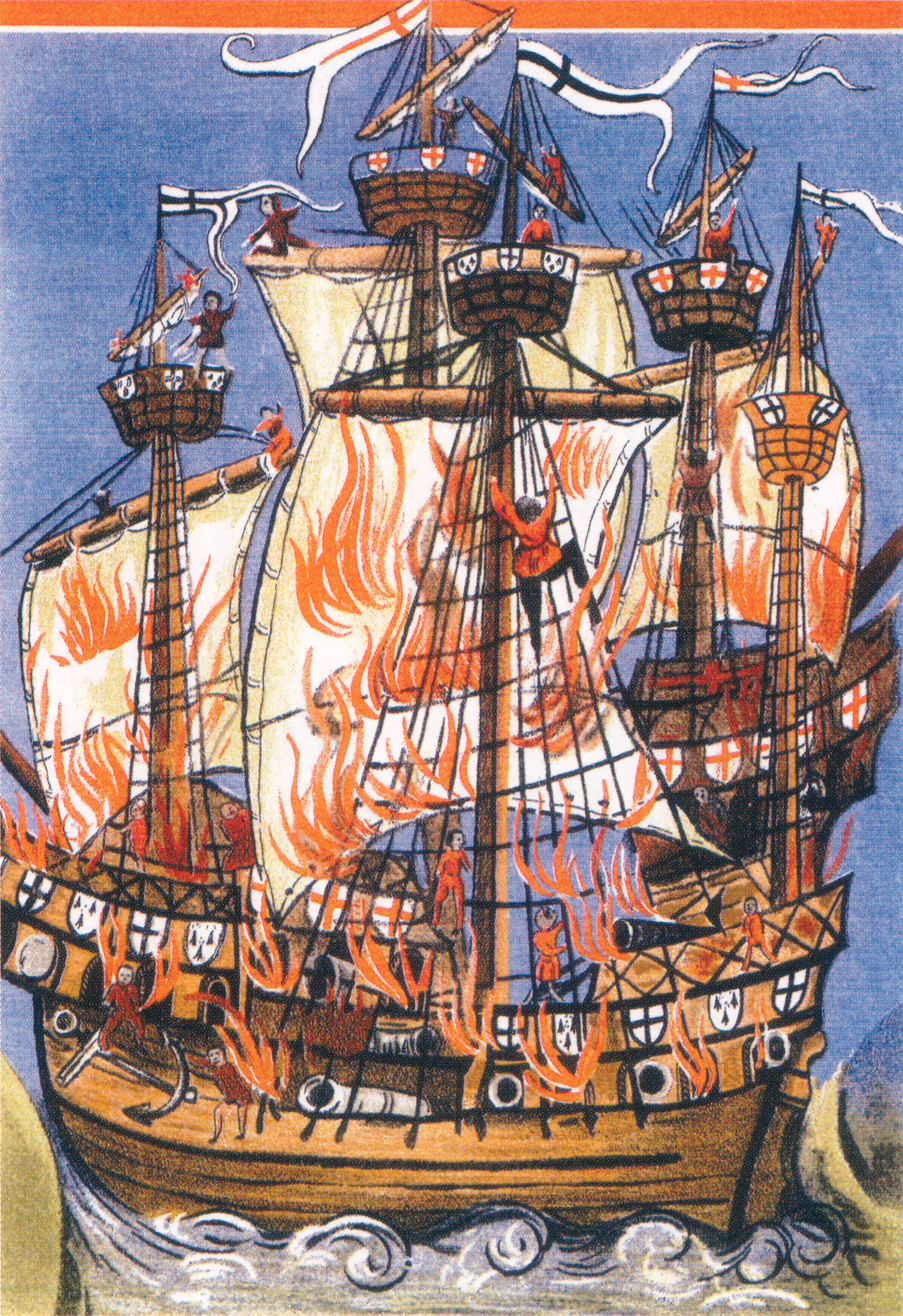
A contemporary illustration of the Breton warship Cordelière and the English warship Regent ablaze at the Battle of St Mathieu on 10 August 1512. Both are flying banderoles: the Breton Kroaz Du and the English flag of St George. The side of the Cordelière is adorned with shields bearing the ducal coat of arms.

The black cross standard became widely used as the emblem of the Breton soldiers and as the flag for the ships from the end of the Hundred Years' War in the 15th century. Belligerent armies then identified themselves with flags inherited from the Crusades: red cross on white for the English, white cross on blue or red for the French, black cross on white for the Bretons.

It was often combined with the ducal coat of arms, hence a flag with ermine spots in each quarter.

Some miniatures of the 15th century depict events of the previous century (at the beginning of the Hundred Years' War) by representing Breton knights with the black cross, but it is not really known if the Bretons fought under this emblem during that century.

== Later use ==
The Kroaz du was the flag representing Brittany on nautical charts of the 16th century. After annexation of 1532, there was never any treaty of union, the admiralty of Brittany kept using the black cross flag for Breton ships (with a modified design).

It also remained the basis for the flags of Nantes and temporarily for those of Saint-Malo and Brest.

The black cross was largely forgotten after the French Revolution, but some Catholic groups and scouts used it again at the end of the 19th century.

This flag has been largely replaced by the Gwenn ha du during the 20th century. The latter is used by moderate nationalists and the general public, including the regional administration.

The Kroaz du has been revived since the late 1990s and was briefly regarded as an emblem of right-wing Breton nationalists (like Adsav), but it is now more and more popular. On the basis of medieval miniatures, a version of the flag was adopted as the emblem of the town of Guérande in 1999. It was also used to create the new flag of Saint-Nazaire in 2008.

== Similarity to other flags ==
Cornish flag of St. Piran

This flag is an exact negative of the flag of Cornwall, sometimes known as Saint Piran's Flag. The connections between Cornwall and Brittany are well documented but the historical links between the two flags, if any exist, are unknown.

The United Baltic Duchy flag is similar in appearance but is a Nordic Cross, rather than an equilateral cross.
