= Glomel =

Glomel Groñvel
- Commune
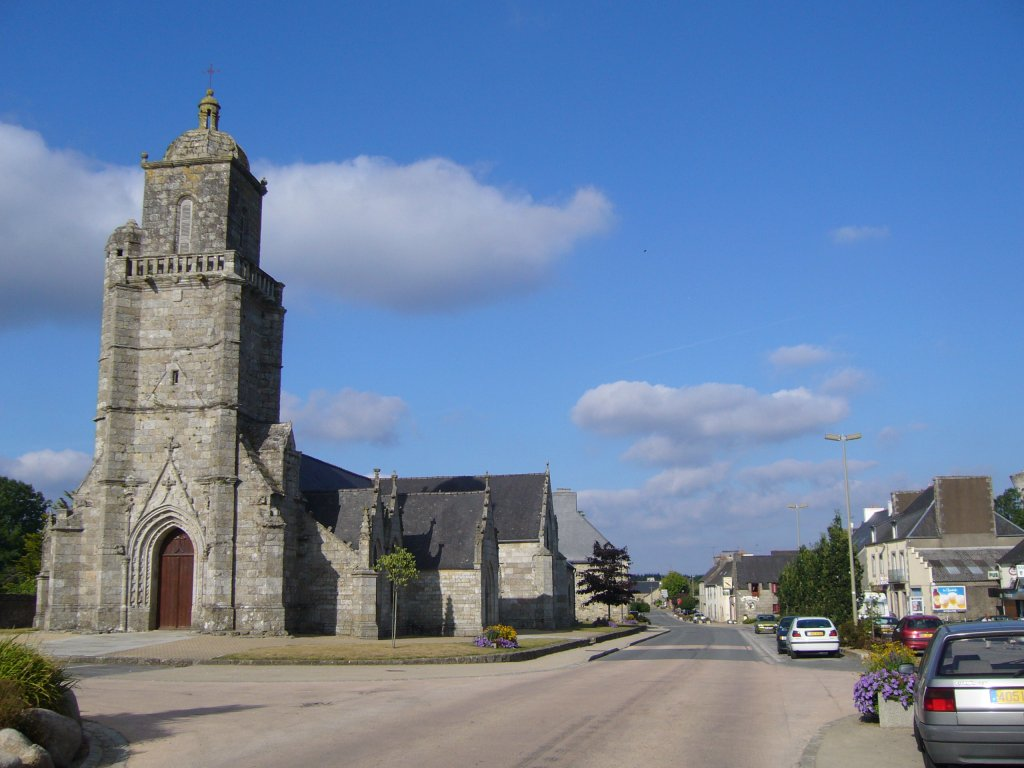
- The church and main road of Glomel
- Location of Glomel
- Location within France Location within Brittany
- Coordinates: 48°13′25″N 3°23′42″W
- Country: France
- Region: Brittany
- Department: Côtes-d'Armor
- Arrondissement: Guingamp
- Canton: Rostrenen
- Intercommunality: Kreiz-Breizh

Government
  - Mayor (2023–2026): Bernard Trubuilt
- Area^{1}: 79.93 km^{2} (30.86 sq mi)
- Highest elevation: 307 m (1,007 ft)
- Lowest elevation: 134 m (440 ft)
- Population (2023): 1,440
  - Density: 18.0/km^{2} (46.7/sq mi)
- Time zone: UTC+01:00 (CET)
  - Summer (DST): UTC+02:00 (CEST)
- INSEE/Postal code: 22061 /22110
- ^{1} French Land Register data, which excludes lakes, ponds, glaciers > 1 km^{2} (0.386 sq mi or 247 acres) and river estuaries.

Glomel (French pronunciation: [ɡlɔmɛl]; Breton: Groñvel) is a commune in the Côtes-d'Armor department in Brittany in northwestern France. The town is also home to the Guerphelès andalusite mine, the largest andalusite mining site in Europe.

== Population ==
Historical population

Year	Pop.	±% p.a.
1806	3,062	—
1836	3,687	+0.62%
1841	3,776	+0.48%
1846	3,674	−0.55%
1851	3,814	+0.75%
1856	3,322	−2.72%
1861	3,457	+0.80%
1866	3,450	−0.04%
1872	3,455	+0.02%
1876	3,552	+0.69%
1881	3,670	+0.66%
1886	3,692	+0.12%
1891	3,796	+0.56%
1896	3,860	+0.33%
1901	3,826	−0.18%
1906	4,027	+1.03%
1911	4,226	+0.97%

Year	Pop.	±% p.a.
1921	3,928	−0.73%
1926	3,974	+0.23%
1931	3,594	−1.99%
1936	3,289	−1.76%
1946	3,142	−0.46%
1954	2,686	−1.94%
1962	2,466	−1.06%
1968	2,044	−3.08%
1975	1,756	−2.15%
1982	1,534	−1.91%
1990	1,457	−0.64%
1999	1,460	+0.02%
2007	1,397	−0.55%
2012	1,414	+0.24%
2017	1,380	−0.49%
2023	1,440	+0.71%

Source: EHESS and INSEE (1968–2023)

Inhabitants of Glomel are called glomelois in French.

== Geography ==
Glomel is located on the northern slope of the Montagnes Noires (French, Black Mountains). The Minez Du is the highest peak in the village. The village centre is located 6 km (3.7 mi) west of Rostrenen and 53 km (33 mi) north of Lorient.

== Geology ==
The geology of Glomel is renowned for its exceptionally rich andalusite deposit, known for having the highest andalusite content in the world. This unique mineral, prized for its high-temperature resistance, has been extracted at the Guerphalès mine since 1970. The site, operated by Imerys, plays a crucial role in the global andalusite market, producing 65,000 tonnes annually, which accounts for 20-25% of global output.

== Map ==
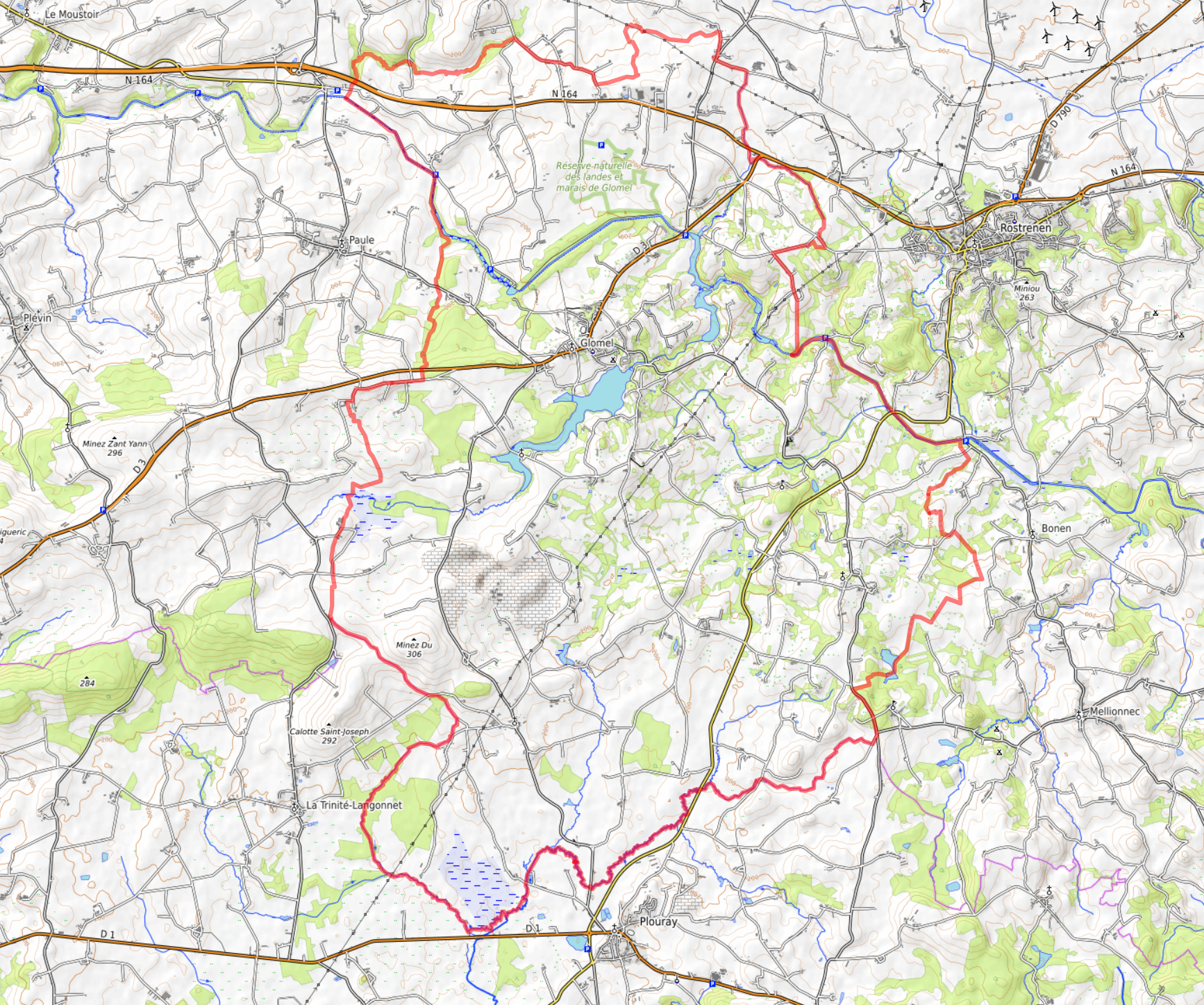
Topographic map

== Breton language ==
In 2008, 25.47% of primary school children attended bilingual schools.

== Gallery ==
=== Churches ===
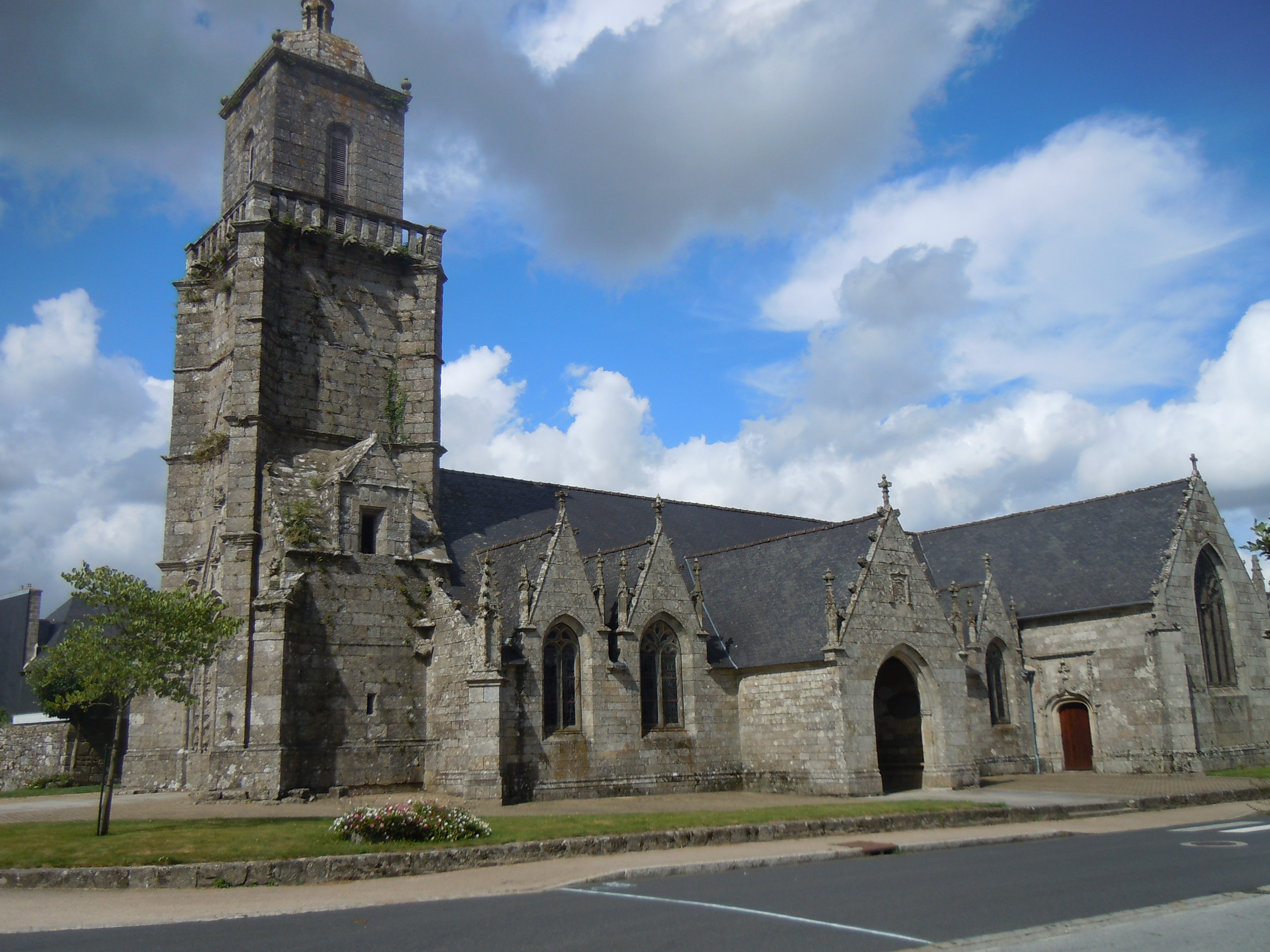
The parish church

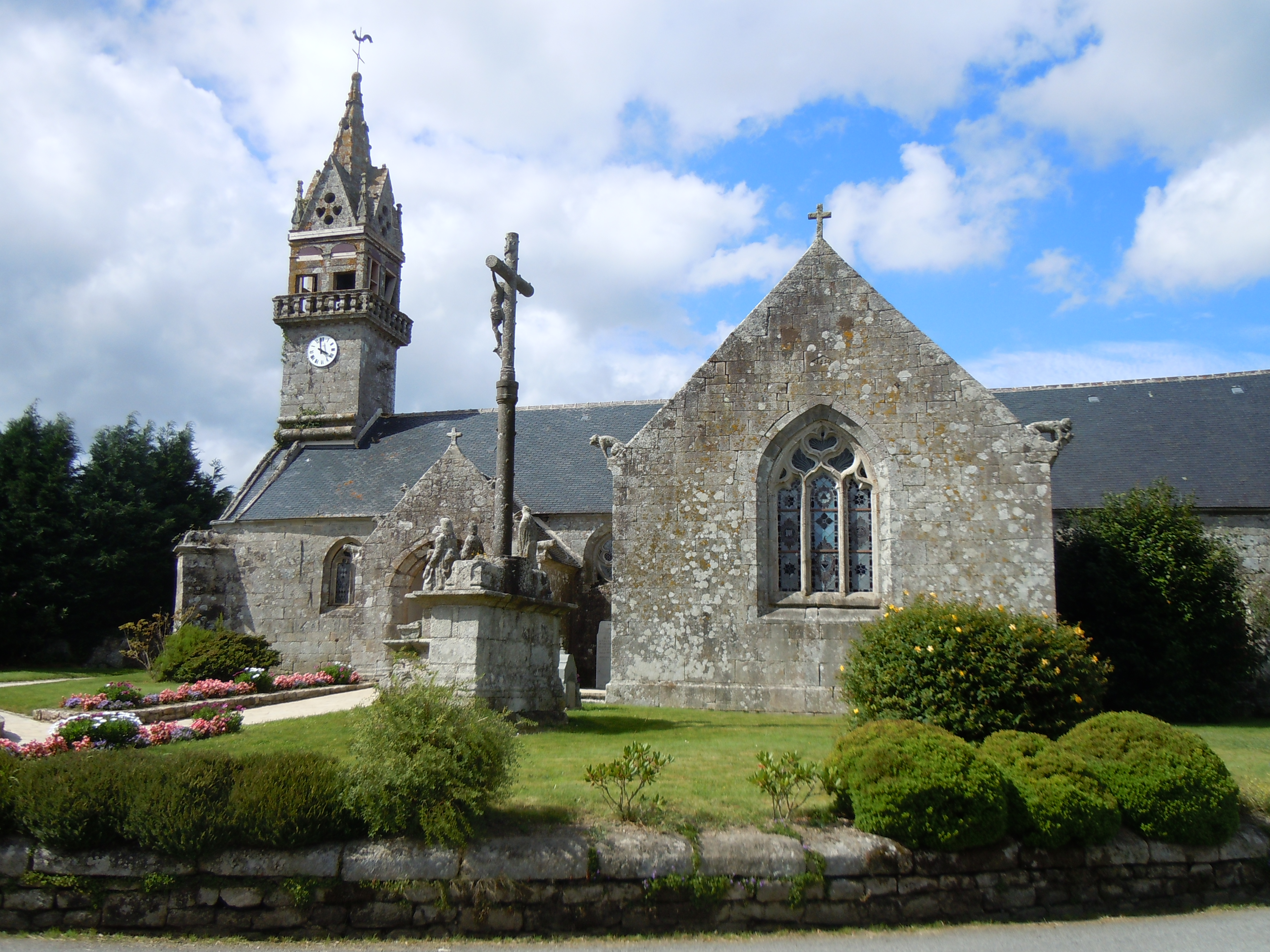
The church Saint Corentin in Trégornan village

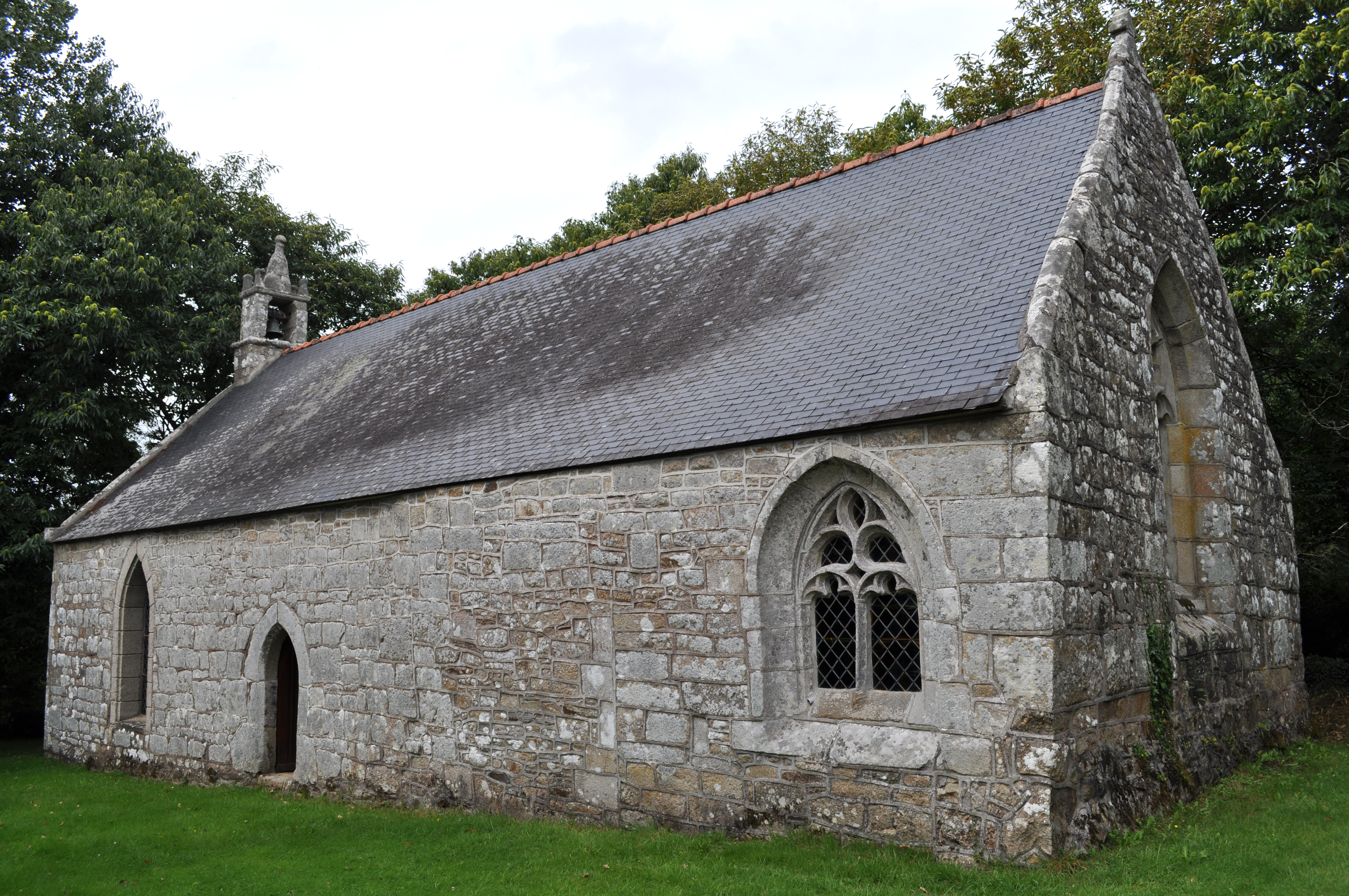
Chapel Saint Conogan

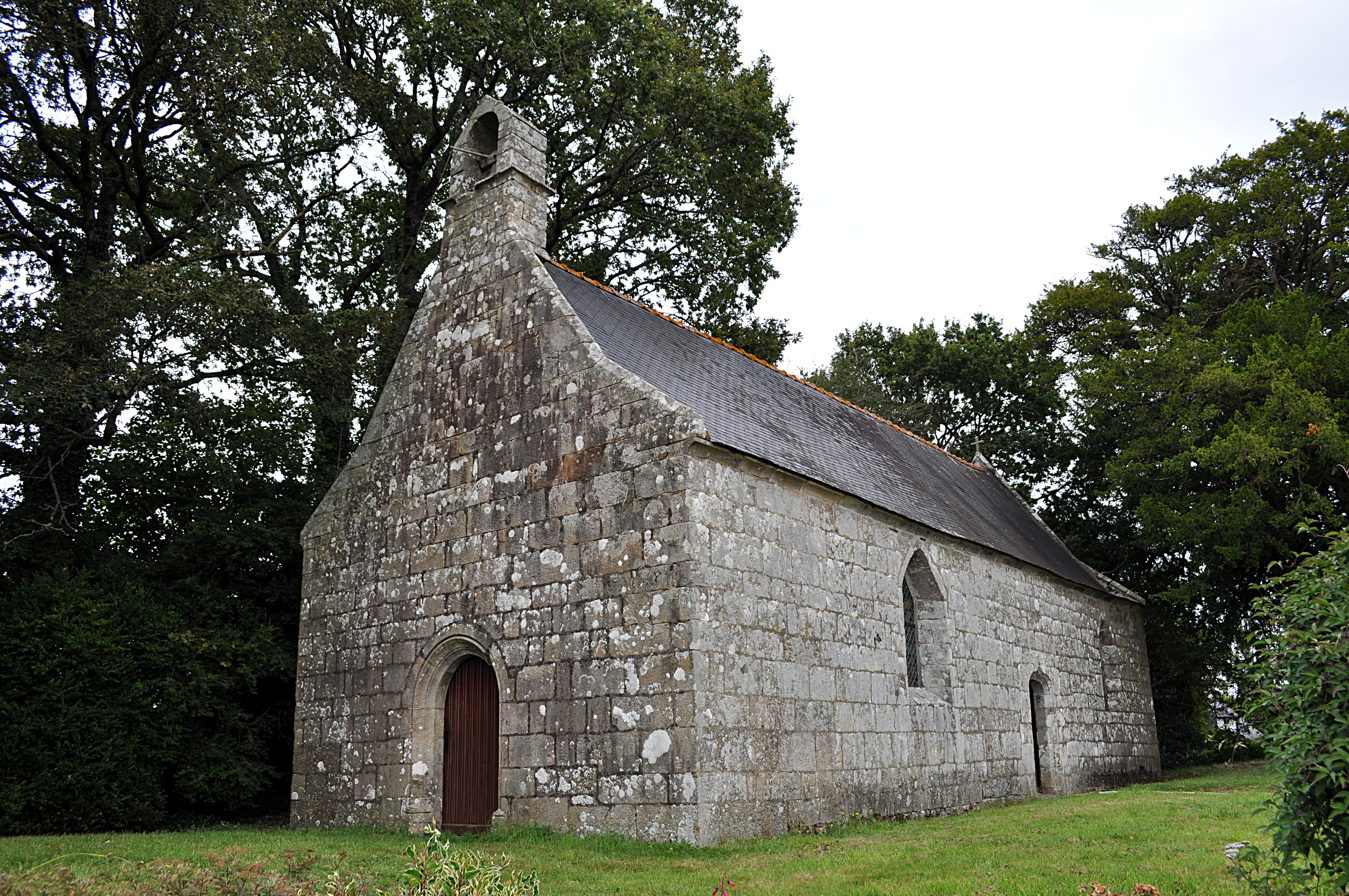
Chapel Sainte Christine

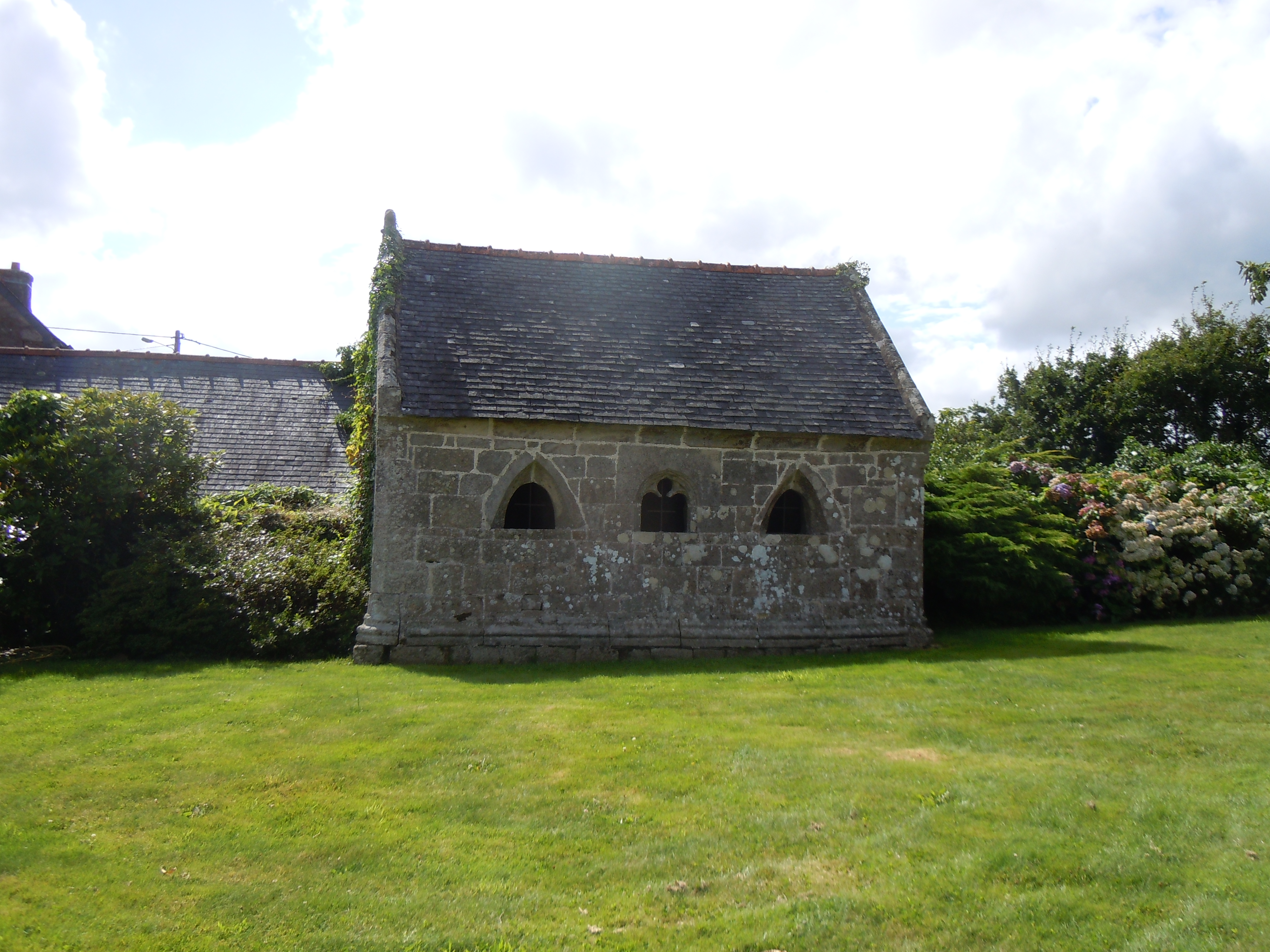
Ossuary in Trégornan village

=== Civil heritage ===
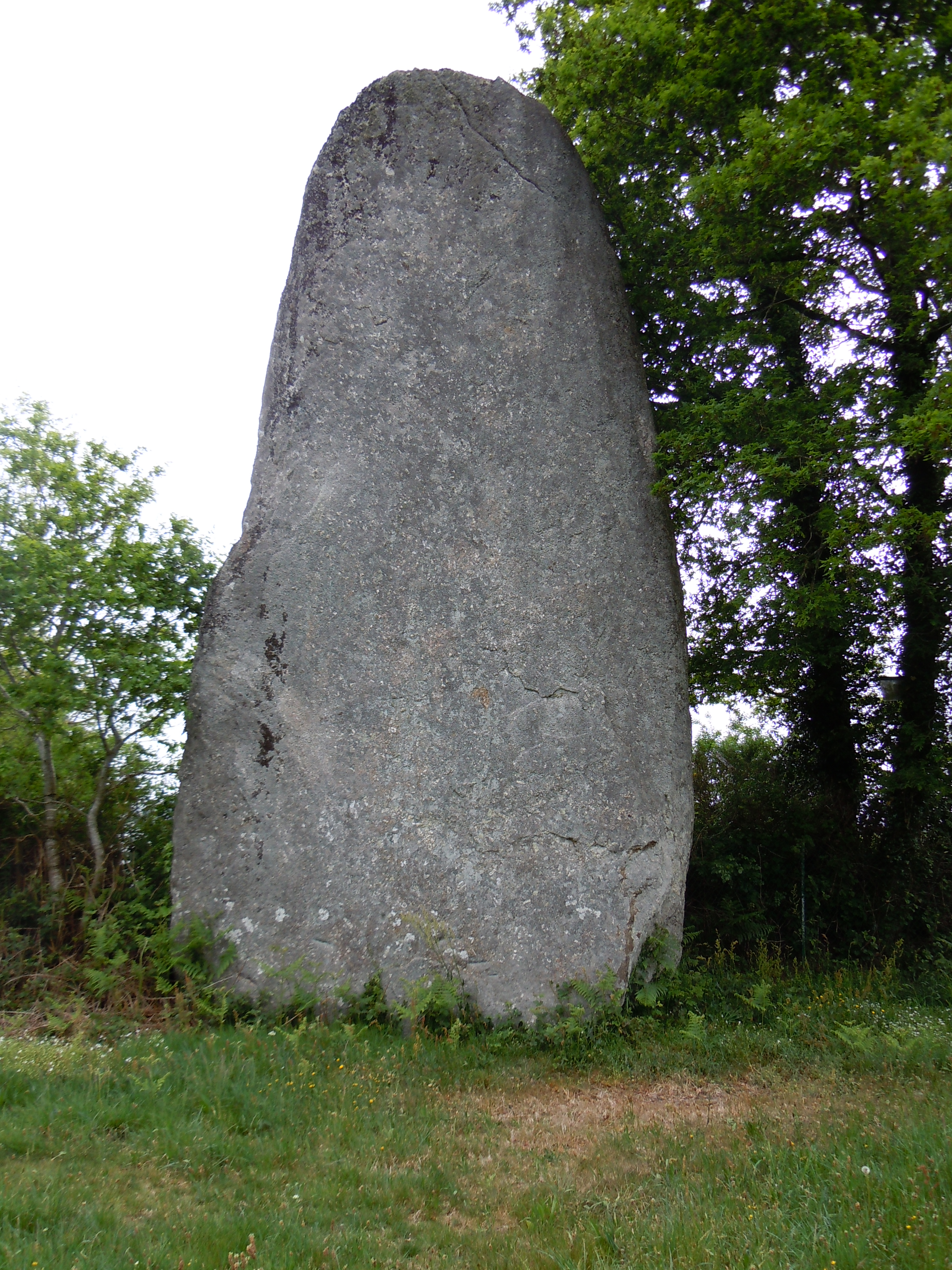
Standing stone in village centre

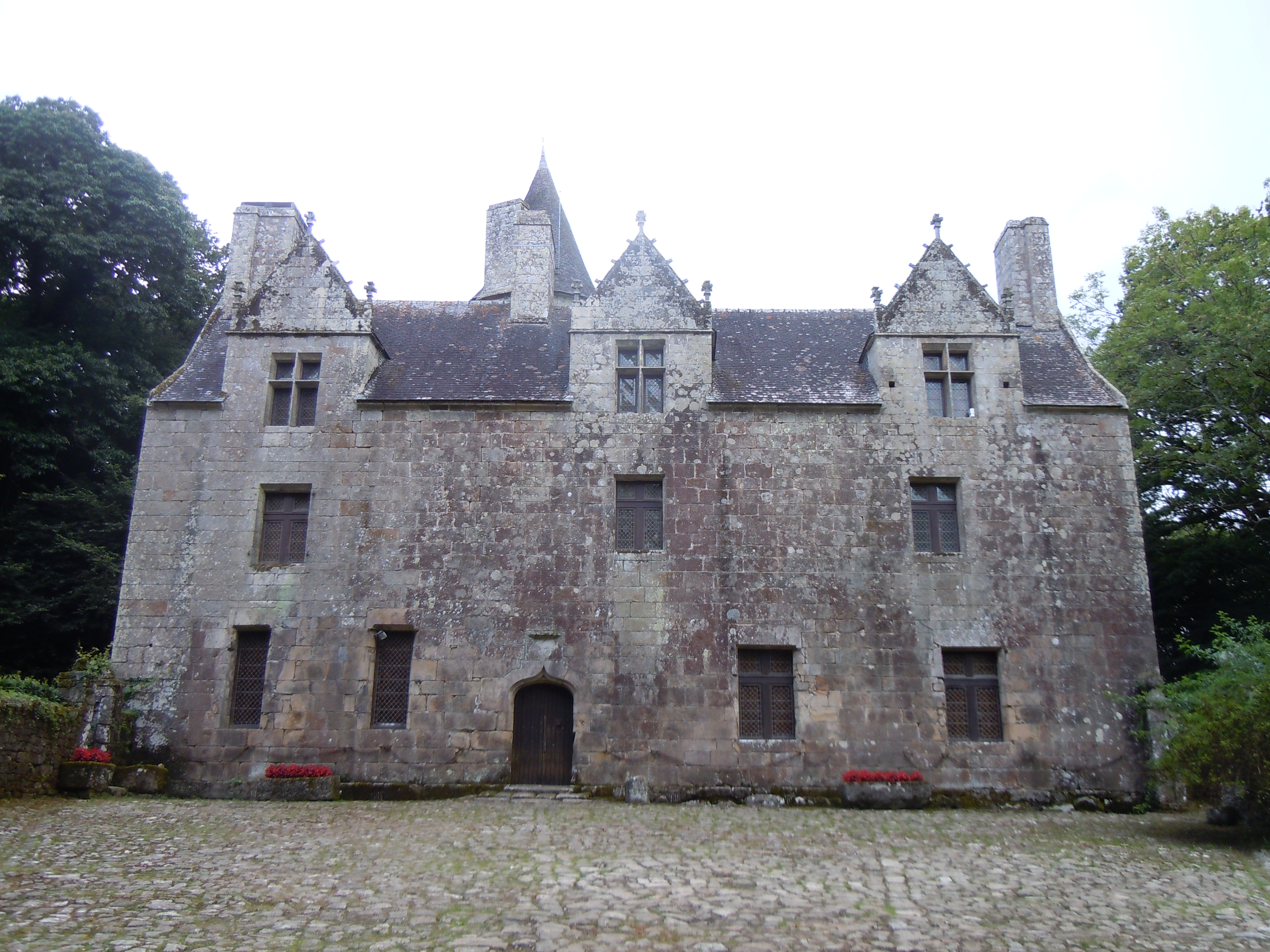
Coatcouraval castle

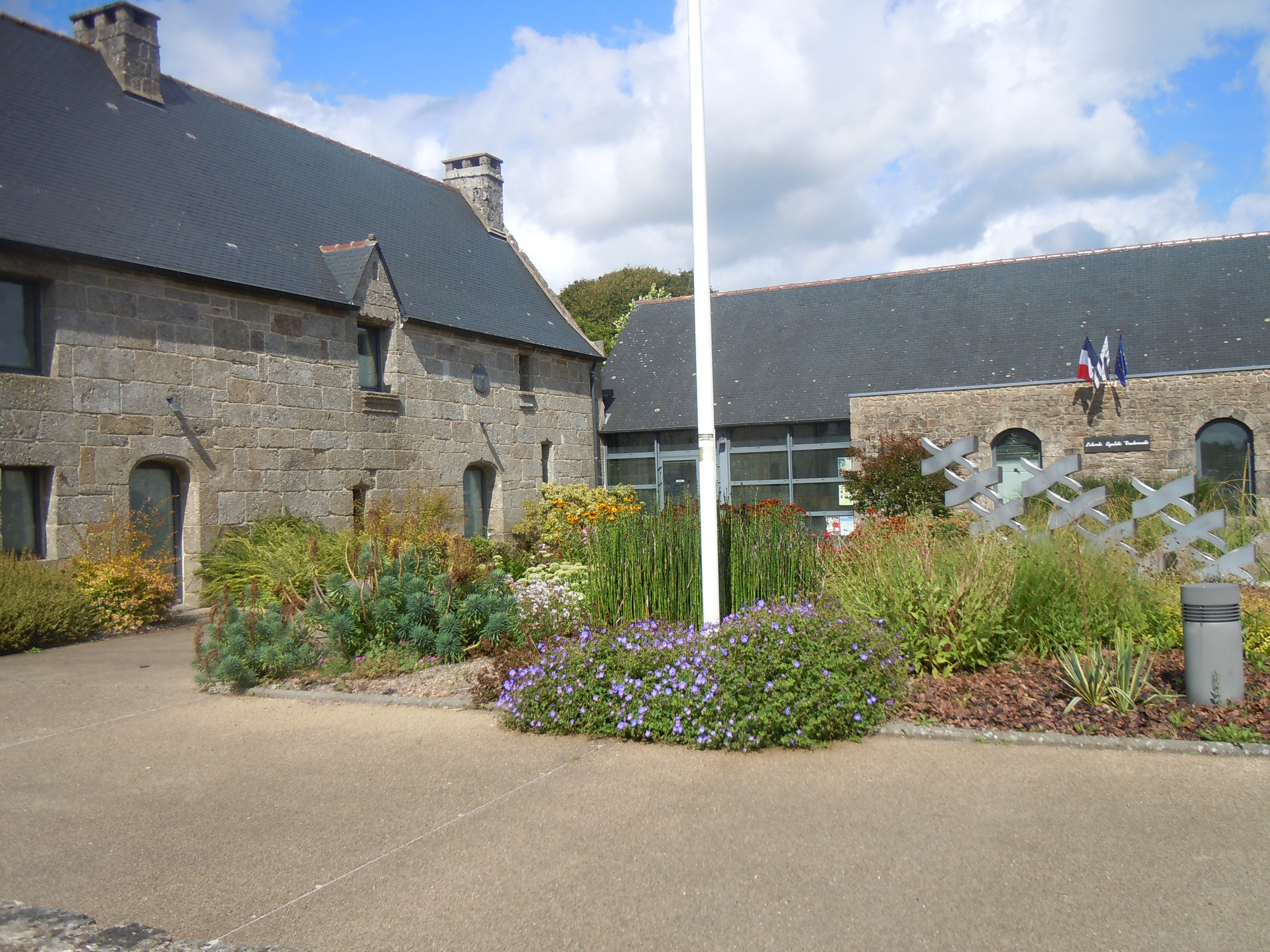
The village hall

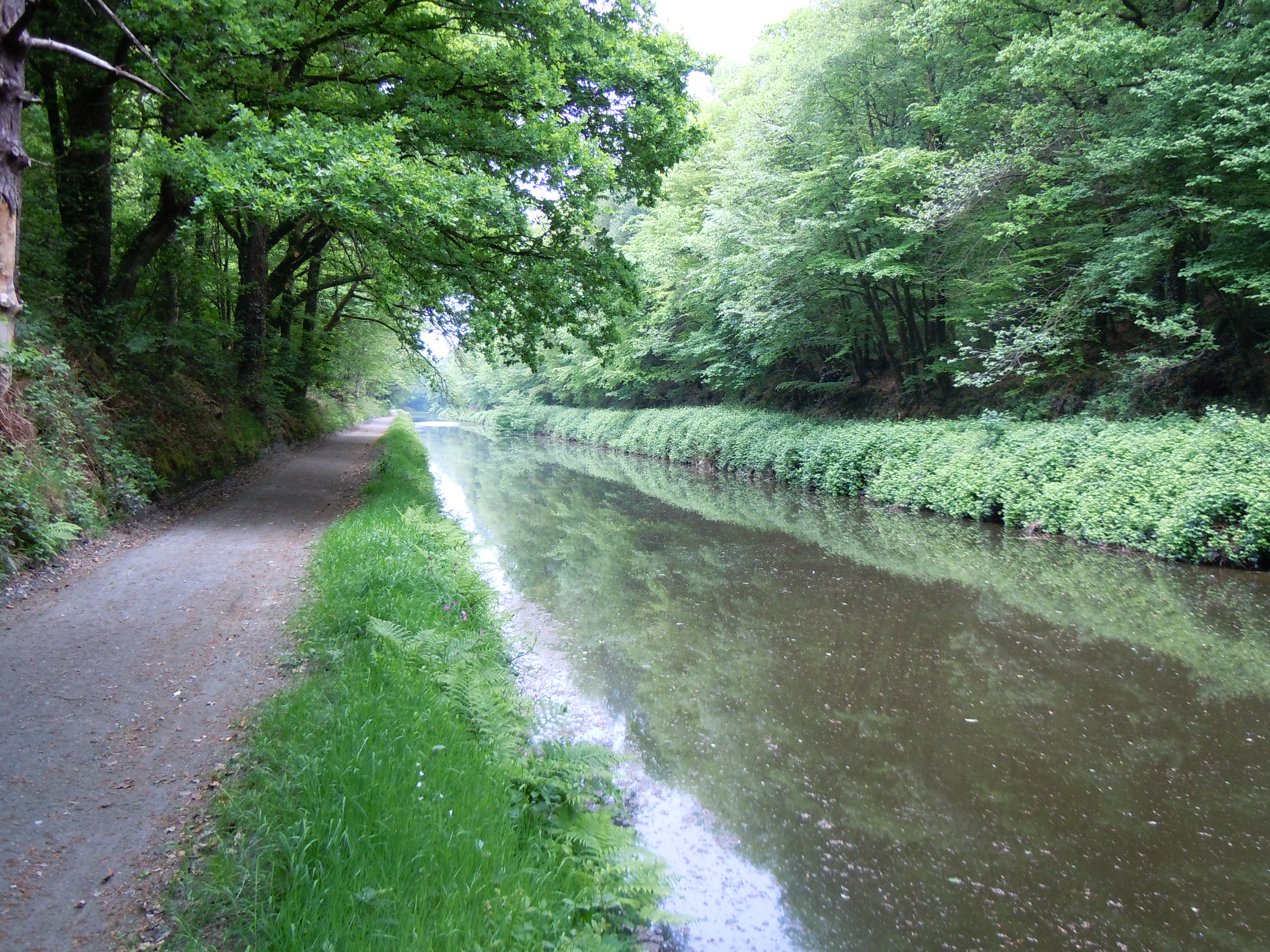
The big trench (canal de Nantes à Brest)

== See also ==
- Communes of the Côtes-d'Armor department
