= List of Cornish flags =

This is a list of flags that are used exclusively in Cornwall, or by the Cornish people, a recognised national minority of the United Kingdom.

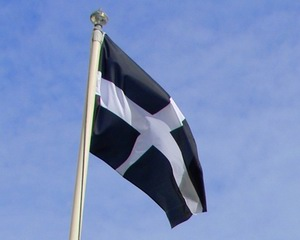
The Cornish flag flying

== Flag ==
Flag	Date	Use	Description
	12th century, adopted in 1890	Saint Piran's Cross, named for the Cornish patron saint, also known as the Flag of Cornwall (Baner Peran).	A centred white cross on a black background

== Royal Standards ==
Flag	Date	Use	Description
	Pre-1695	Standard of the Duke of Cornwall	15 Cornish golden bezants on a black field
	pre-2007	Flag of the Duchy of Cornwall, flown outside the Duchy's offices in London	

=== Peerage ===
Flag	Date	Use	Description
		Banner of the Earl of Mount Edgcumbe	A square banner of the Earl's coat of arms.
		Banner of the Viscount Falmouth	A banner of the arms of the Boscawen family (the current holders of the title), flown atop the country house of Tregothnan.

== Regional flags ==
Flag	Date	Use	Description
	2002	The Scillonian Cross, the official flag of the Isles of Scilly.	The Scillonian Cross, top half gold; representing the golden sand of the beaches, bottom half blue; representing the sea. Also with the top right corner picturing stars representing the location of the islands.

== Villages ==
Flag	Date	Use	Description
		Flag of Malpas	

== Religious flags ==
Flag	Date	Use	Description
	1876	Flag of the Diocese of Truro	A Saint George's Cross defaced with the coat of arms of the Diocese in the canton.
	1950	Flag of St Austell Parish	A white eagle flying westwards over a gold map of Cornwall on a field of blue.

== Historical flags ==
Flag	Date	Use	Description
	Pre-1415		Two Cornish wrestlers in a hitch, still used by the Cornish Wrestling association. Supposed used at Agincourt
	??		The Cornish chough used as an emblem.
	c.1940–1944	Flag of the 11th (Newquay) Battalion, Cornwall Home Guard	A light yellow flag with a black Cornish chough, used by the Newquay unit of the Cornwall Home Guard (the unit's nickname was "The Choughs").

== Organisations ==
Flag	Date	Use	Description
Link to file	1894	Cornwall County Cricket Club	
	1883	Cornwall Rugby Football Union	A Saint Piran's Cross with two horizontal gold stripes in each quarter.
		Cornish Wrestling Association	A banner used by the Cornish Wrestling Association, based on that allegedly used by Cornish soldiers at Agincourt. The text above the wrestlers reads "KERNOW BYS VYKEN" ("CORNWALL FOREVER"), and the text below the wrestlers reads "GWARY WHEK YU GWARY TEK" ("GOOD PLAY IS FAIR PLAY").
		Cornish Maritime Trust	A long white pennant surrounded by a red border and defaced with the name "CORNISH MARITIME TRUST" in red.
	1928	Gorsedh Kernow	
	1920	Isles of Scilly Steamship Company	A white cross on a blue field, with each quarter containing one of the company's initials in red.

=== Yacht and sailing clubs ===
Flag	Date	Use	Description
	1972	Cargreen Yacht Club	A green burgee defaced with a red brick chimney outlined in black in the hoist.
	1921	Flushing Sailing Club	A black burgee defaced with a gold letter "V".
	1948	Helford River Sailing Club	A blue burgee divided by a red cross outlined in white, with a gold ship in the centre.
	1934	Looe Sailing Club	A diagonally divided burgee of seven red and yellow stripes (four red and three yellow) defaced with a black silhouette of a ship on the waves.
		Mount's Bay Sailing Club	
	1963	Mylor Yacht Club	A white burgee divided by a red Saint George's Cross with the shield from the arms of the Duchy of Cornwall in the canton.
	1965	Padstow Sailing Club	A white burgee defaced with a red-and-white fish and surrounded by a blue border.
	1939–1990s	Penzance Sailing Club	A white burgee defaced with a black skull and crossbones.
	1990s	Penzance Sailing Club	A black burgee divided by a white Saint Piran's Cross, with a black skull and crossbones on a white disc in the centre.
	1958	Port Navas Yacht Club	A black burgee with the white-coloured initials "PNYC" arranged vertically in the hoist and separated from the rest of the burgee by a vertical white line, and the rest of the burgee divided by a white Saint Piran's Cross with a gold ship's wheel to the upper left of the cross.
	1951	Porthpean Sailing Club	A blue burgee divided by a white cross, defaced in the centre with a white shield bearing a red saltire.
	1974	The Quay Sailing Club	A white burgee with a crimson border, defaced with a white shield containing three black bells (two above and one below) in the hoist, and the black-coloured initials "Q.S.C." in the fly.
	1933	Restronguet Sailing Club	A blue burgee defaced with a white seashell and surrounded by a white border.
	1938	Rock Sailing and Waterski Club	A yellow burgee defaced with a black silhouette of a camel.
	1871	Royal Cornwall Yacht Club	Blue Ensign, with the Prince of Wales's feathers heraldic badge.
	1880	Royal Fowey Yacht Club	Red Ensign, with the coat of arms of the Duke of Cornwall.
	1972	St Ives Sailing Club	
	1920	St Mawes Sailing Club	A white-and-red quartered burgee with the shield from the arms of the Duchy of Cornwall in the canton.
	1898	Saltash Sailing Club	
	1975	Seadog Owners Association	A blue burgee with a golden simplified silhouette of a Seadog 30 in the middle.
	1891	Torpoint Mosquito Sailing Club	A dark blue burgee divided by a white cross and defaced with a red diamond in the centre.

== Ensigns ==
Flag	Date	Use	Description
		Another unofficial Cornish Merchant Naval ensign	Black flag with a white cross, and a Union Jack in the canton.
		Another unofficial Cornish ensign, flown on the ferry from St Mawes to Falmouth.	A black field divided by a white cross, with a Union Jack in the canton and the Standard of the Duke of Cornwall in the lower fly.

== Diaspora ==
Flag	Date	Use	Description
	1988	Cornish Australian Flag	The Cornish flag defaced with the Standard Stars of the Australian Flag.

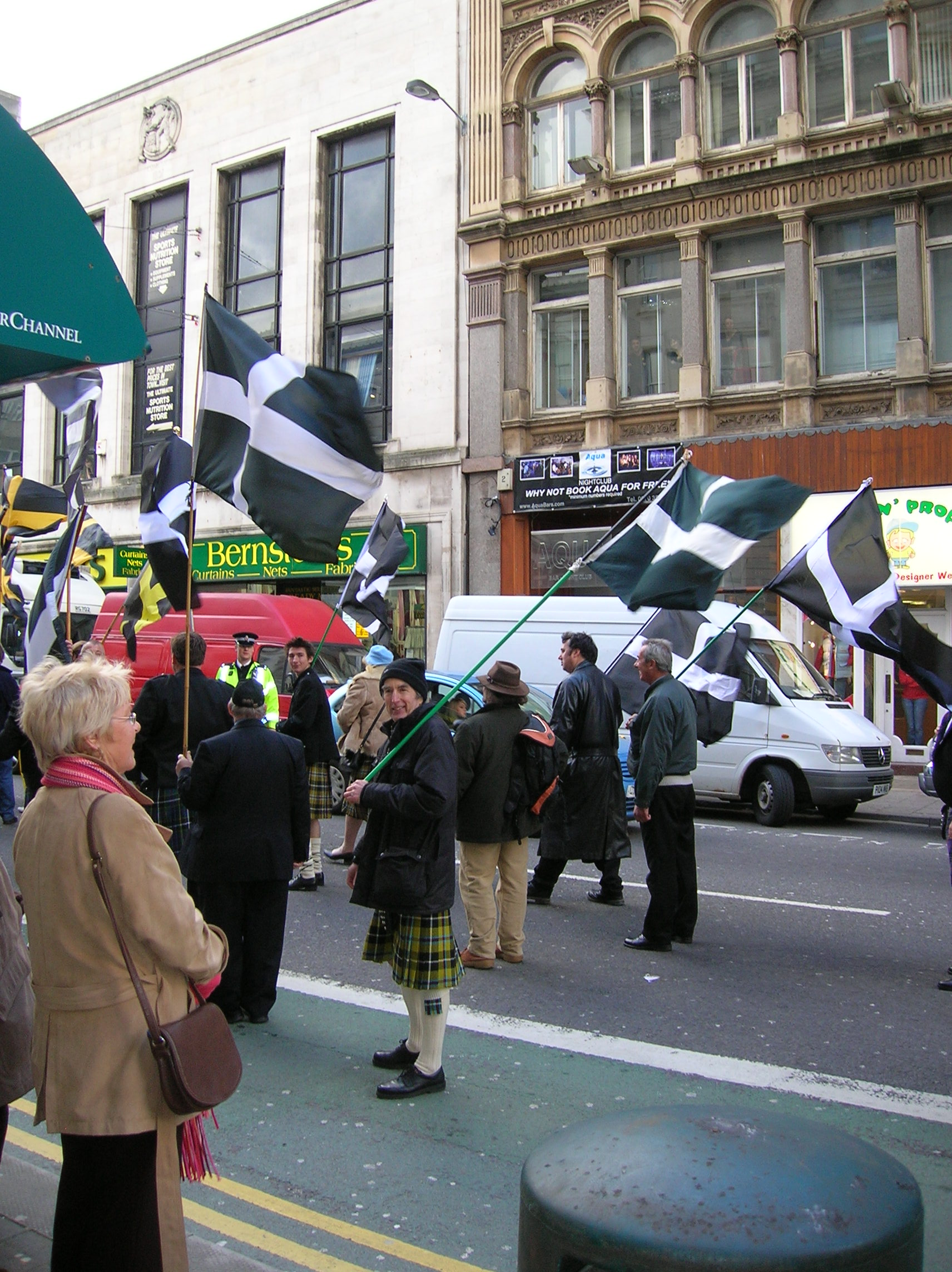
The Cornish flag being flown in a parade

== See also ==
- List of flags of the United Kingdom
- Ethnic groups in the UK
