= Glomel andalusite mine =

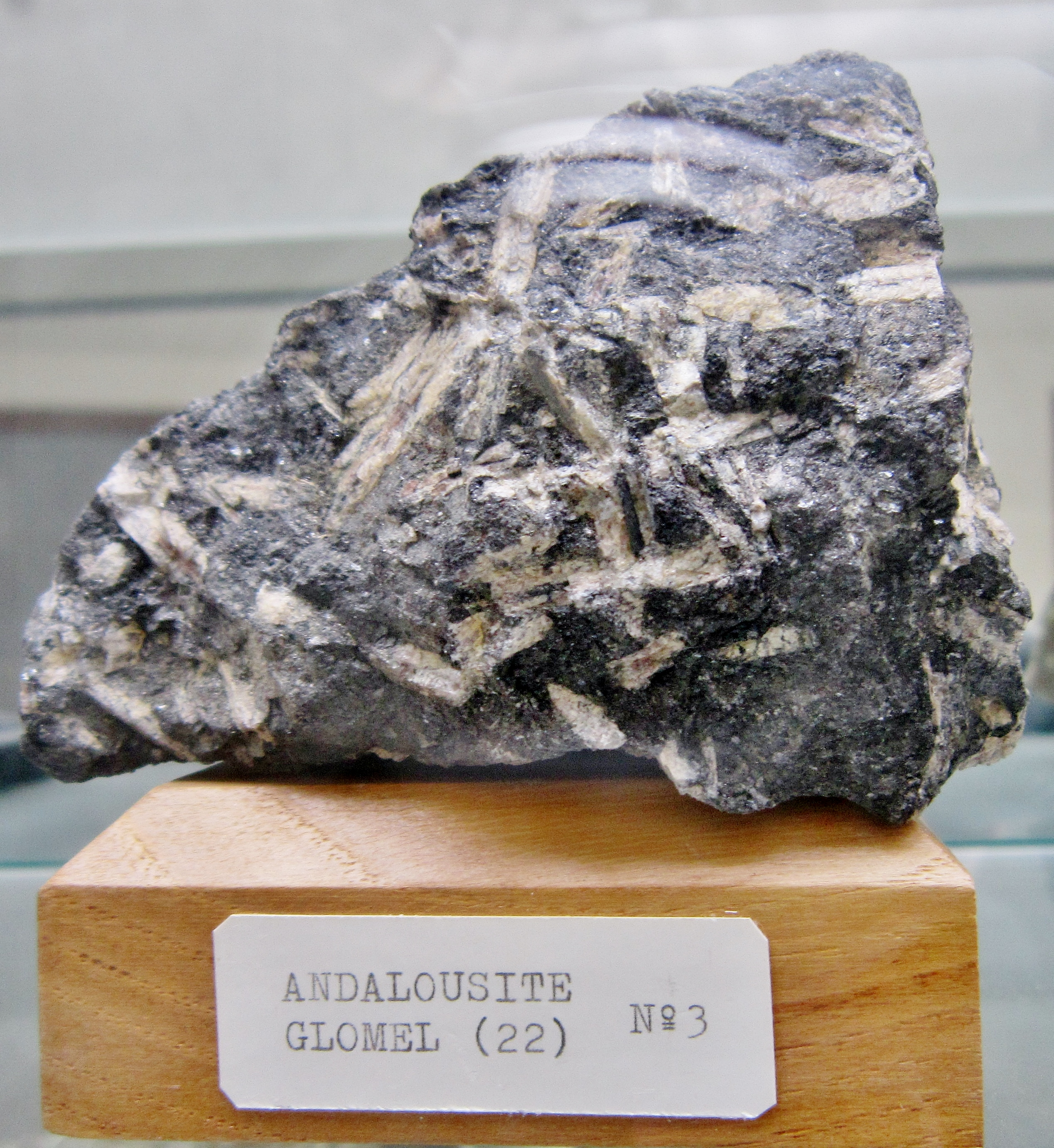
- Andalusite sample from Glomel. The Guerphalès deposit has the highest andalusite content in the world.

- Location within France
- Location: Glomel (Côtes d'Armor),,France; 48.190044°N 3.411798°W
- Products: Andalusite
- Opened: 1970

The Glomel andalusite mine is a French mining site in Guerphalès in the commune of Glomel (Côtes-d'Armor, Brittany). The mineral extracted, andalusite, has been extracted there since 1970 and is mainly used for the manufacture of refractory materials due to its resistance to high temperatures. The mine operator, Imerys, extracts 65,000 tonnes of andalusite each year, representing 20 to 25% of global production.

== Operation ==
The Guerphalès deposit has the highest andalusite content in the world and its exploitation employs 110 people.

Andalusite is extracted in the open pit, mainly from the third pit, using explosive blasts. The extracted blocks are transported to the plant where they are crushed and screened. The andalusite is then separated from other minerals by magnetic and electrostatic processes. After purification, the mineral is crushed into powder or granules to be used in the manufacture of refractory materials. The water used in the extraction is recycled in a closed circuit and treated before being discharged.

Overall, 1.2 million tonnes of ore are extracted each year, representing 65,000 tonnes of refined product (20 to 25% of world production).

== History ==
The first pit opened in 1970 at the same time as the Damrec factory (Donain Anzin minerals refractory and ceramics). The second opened in 1986.

In 1998, the first pit closed and pit 3 opened.

In 2021, Imerys filed an environmental authorization application with the aim of opening a fourth pit. A public inquiry was held from 10/30 to 15 December 2023, at the end of which the commissioner issued a favorable opinion "based on the study of the file, the observations of the public, the opinions given by the authorities concerned and by the State services, as well as the visits to the sites concerned" but requested "that all of the commitments made by Imerys be transcribed as requirements in the new operating authorization".

In 2024, the extension of the Andalusite mine was validated by the Côtes-d'Armor prefecture, but it aroused opposition. While the mayor and many residents supported the project for its economic benefits and the preservation of jobs, environmental defenders, concerned about the risks of pollution, filed a legal appeal.
