= Saint Piran's Flag =

Flag of Cornwall

Flag of Cornwall
- Other names: St Piran's Flag, Baner Peran, An Gwynn ha Du
- Use: Civil flag
- Proportion: 3:5
- Adopted: 19th century
- Design: A white cross on a black background. (Sable, a cross argent)

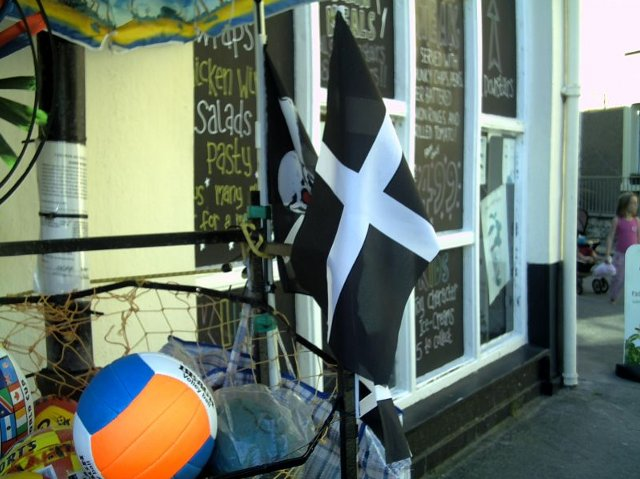
Souvenir flags outside a café

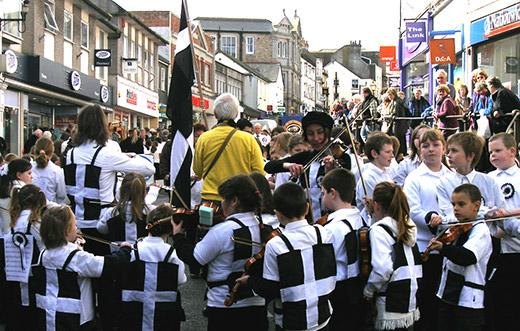
Saint Piran's Day celebrations in Penzance

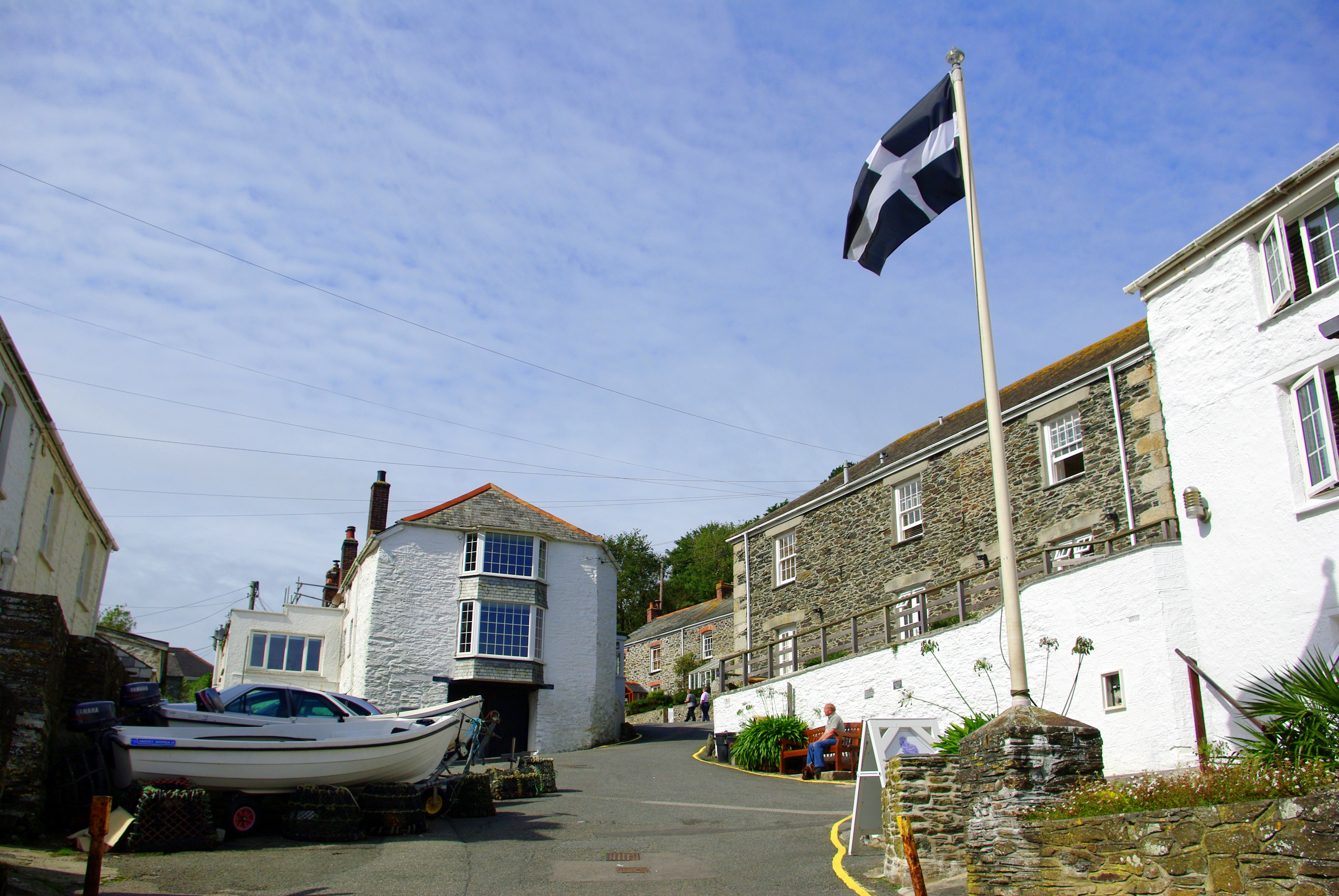
Flying the flag in Portloe

Saint Piran's Flag (Cornish: Baner Peran) is the flag of Cornwall. The earliest known description of the flag, referred to as the Standard of Cornwall, was written in 1838. It is used by Cornish people as a symbol of their identity.

The flag is attributed to Saint Piran, a 5th-century Cornish abbot. But the white cross and black background design is also the coat of arms of the Saint-Perran (or Saint-Pezran) family from Cornouaille in Brittany, recorded from the 15th century.

== Origins ==
The earliest known evidence of this flag was recorded by Davies Gilbert in his 1838 work: The Parochial History of Cornwall, in which he gives reference to

a white cross on a black ground [that] was formerly the banner of St Perran and the Standard of Cornwall; probably with some allusion to the black ore and the white metal of tin

The fact that Gilbert identifies it as being "formerly" a standard of Cornwall implies that he believed it to have been used before 1838. However, Gilbert did not leave a record of his background research, and referred only to his "recollection".

One of the oldest depictions of the flag can be seen in a stained glass window at Westminster Abbey. It was unveiled in 1888, in memory of the famous Cornish inventor and engineer Richard Trevithick. The window depicts St Michael at the top and nine Cornish saints, Piran, Petroc, Pinnock, Germanus, Julian, Cyriacus, Constantine, Nonna and Geraint in tiers below. The head of St Piran appears to be a portrait of Trevithick himself, and the figure carries the banner of Cornwall.

== Clues to its origin ==
Saint Piran's Flag has similarities to the old Breton flag and the flag of Saint David. The cultural links between Brittany, Wales and Cornwall are well recorded. Saint Piran's Flag is the negative image of the old Breton flag, a black cross on a white field. The flag of Saint David shares a black background with Saint Piran's Flag, but is surmounted by a gold, rather than a white, cross.

The Standard of the Army of the Breton Duchy (An Kroaz Du)

The Welsh flag of Saint David

It has also been suggested that it may have been based on the arms of the Earl of Cornwall, or the later Duchy of Cornwall; based on the arms of other Cornish families; or be linked with the black and white livery of the Knights of St John.

== French and Breton family arms ==
The arms of the Saint-Peran family in Brittany, show a white cross pattée on a black field.

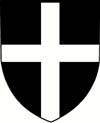
Arms of Geoffroy le Borgne

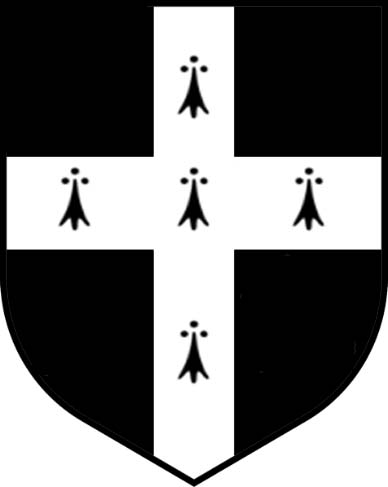
Arms of the Arnèke family

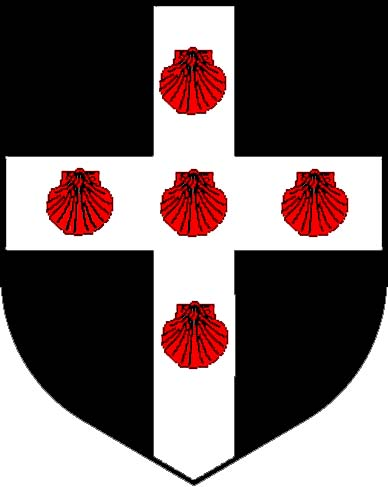
Arms of Rouvroy de Saint-Simon

Arms of Saint-Peran family (Brittany)

Several other French and Breton families also had coats of arms that bear a striking resemblance to the St Piran's flag:

- Saint Peran or Saint Pezran (= Piran) of Brittany (from Glomel, in Cornouaille), is described as, sable à croix patée d'argent.
- Geoffroy le Borgne of Brittany is described as de sable à croix d'argent.
- Rossillon de Gex, coat of arms described: De sable à la croix d'argent.
- Brunet, de la Besse, coat of arms described: D'azur, à la croix d'argent.
- Arnèke Family coat of arms.
- Rouvroy de Saint-Simon of Picardy, described: De sable à la croix d'argent chargée de cinq coquilles.

== Myths about the origins ==
There are a very large number of modern legends about the origins of the flag.

An article in the old Encyclopaedia Britannica on "Cornish Wrestling" stated that the flag was carried by the Cornish contingent at the Battle of Agincourt (1415). However, the reference given by the Encyclopaedia Britannica seems to have been confused with one that comes from a 1590 poem entitled Poly-Olbion by Michael Drayton. It states that the banner carried by the Cornish men at Agincourt depicted two Cornish wrestlers in a hitch.

== Usage ==
The flag is often displayed on bumper stickers, and flying from buildings, including those of Cornwall Council. It is flown at most Cornish gatherings, such as the Gorsedh Kernow, St Piran's Day (5 March), Camborne's Trevithick Day (April), Padstow's 'Obby 'Oss festival (May), Helston's Flora Day (May), and at Cornish rugby matches. It is regularly seen around Cornwall on car stickers with the word Kernow (Cornish for Cornwall), and is used around the world as a symbol of the Cornish diaspora or overseas Cornish associations. It has been adapted for use in the logos of a number of organisations, such as the Cornwall district of the Methodist Church, is used by a variety of Cornish businesses such as Ginsters, and is seen on the design of the Cornish All Blacks rugby shirts as well as the Cornish Pirates rugby logo.

At the Thames Diamond Jubilee Pageant in June 2012, the flag was flown on the Royal Rowing Barge alongside the flags representing England, Scotland, Northern Ireland, Wales and the City of London. One of the largest flags in the pageant was also St Piran's Flag, flown by the St Ives mackerel lugger Barnabas.

The flags of Smith Island, Maryland and Tangier, Virginia incorporate St. Piran's cross in the upper-left canton in recognition of the early settlers who came to the islands from Cornwall and Devon.

The flag can be seen in Doc Martin, which is set in the fictional Cornwall fishing village of Portwenn and filmed in the real-life one of Port Isaac.

== Gallery ==
The flag of the Duke of Cornwall

Cornish Ensign

Flag of Malpas

Burgee of Penzance Sailing Club

Burgee of Port Navas Yacht Club

Cornish Australian heritage flag

Flag of Smith Island, Maryland

Flag of Tangier, Virginia

== See also ==
- Outline of Cornwall
- List of Cornish flags
- Cornish heraldry
- The Flag of the Duchy of Brittany
- List of topics related to Cornwall
- St Piran's Day
- Flag of Devon
- Scillonian Cross
