= Banderole =

Small but long flag or banner

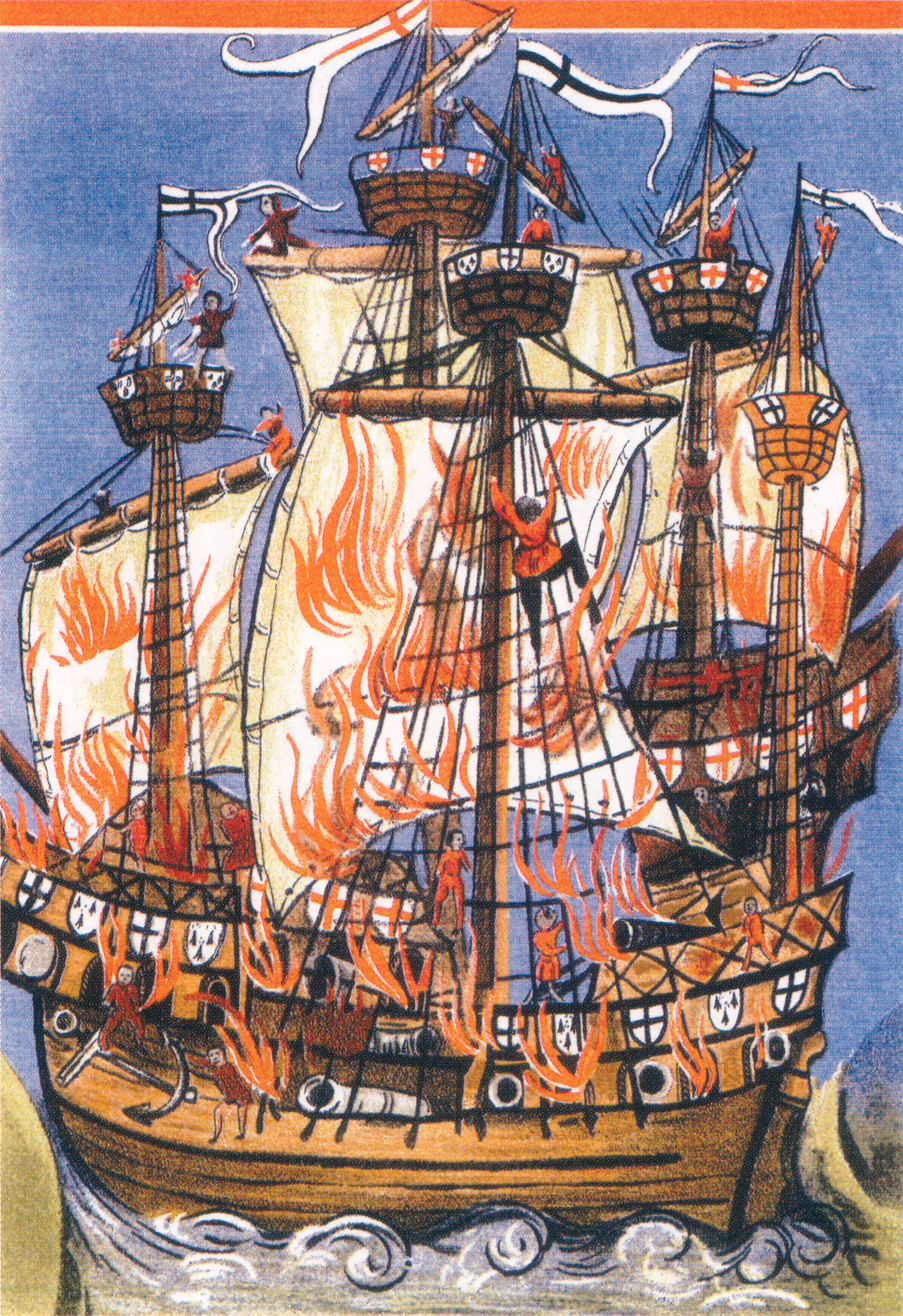
A contemporary illustration of the Breton warship Cordelière and the English warship Regent ablaze at the Battle of St. Mathieu on 10 August 1512. Both are flying banderoles (the Breton Kroaz Du and the English flag of St. George.)

A banderole (French: [bɑ̃dʁɔl], "little banner") is a comparatively small but long flag, historically used by knights and on ships, and as a heraldic device for representing bishops.

Bannerol, in its main uses, is the same as banderole, and is the term especially applied to banners about a yard square carried at the funerals of great men and placed over the tomb. Often it commemorated a particular exploit of the person bearing the coat of arms. Banderole (a wooden stick having one pointed end covered with metallic shoe) is used in conventional military survey. It's used to depict various stations established during carrying the survey forward. Double banderole are used to erect Survey Beacon.

== Knights, bishops and ships ==
A banderole is a small flag or streamer carried on the lance of a knight, or a long narrow flag, with cleft end, flying from the mast-head of a ship in battle.

Lion rampant holding a banderole

In heraldry, a banderole is a streamer hanging from beneath the crook of a bishop's crosier and folding over the staff, and for other small streamers or ribbons.

== Art and architecture ==
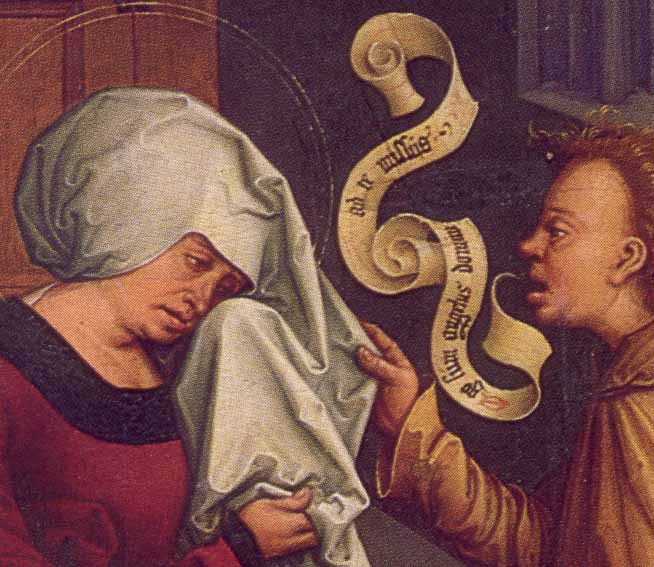
A 1506 painting by Bernhard Strigel with banderole.

The term is also used in art and architecture for a speech scroll or streamer, representing a roll of parchment carried by or surrounding a figure or object, for bearing an inscription, mainly during the medieval and Renaissance periods. In particular banderoles were used as attributes for Old Testament prophets, as may be seen in the Santa Trinita Maestà by Cimabue, (Uffizi, 1280–90), Duccio's Maestà (1308–11), and other works. The convention had a historical appropriateness, as the Old Testament was originally written on scrolls, whereas nearly all surviving New Testament manuscripts are codices (like modern books). They may also be used for the words of angels, especially Gabriel's greeting to Mary in Annunciation scenes.

== Modern administrative use ==
In several countries, particularly in the Middle East and parts of Europe, the term banderol or bandrol (derived from the French banderole) is also used in a modern administrative and legal sense to refer to an official tax stamp or excise seal applied to consumer goods. These “tax banderoles” are affixed to products such as cigarettes, alcoholic beverages, tea, and other excisable goods to certify that customs duties or domestic excise taxes have been paid, and to prevent counterfeiting and illicit trade.

In Turkey, for example, the Ministry of Culture and the Ministry of Trade use the term bandrol in legislation and in their regulatory systems for tax-control labels placed on books, CDs, tobacco products, and other taxable items. Similar usage is found in several post-Ottoman jurisdictions and in certain European excise systems where paper seals based on the same historical term remain in use.
