= PASAB =

PASAB (Penzance Around Scilly and Back) is an annual yacht race held off the western coast of Cornwall in South West England, held in the last week of July each year.

== Format ==
The race is held over the course of three days, and is divided into three legs, each starting on consecutive days. In the first leg competitors sail from Penzance to St Mary's, the largest of the Isles of Scilly, then the following day they race in a circuit around the islands. The third and final day sees the fleet return to Penzance.

The overall winner of the race is presented with the Manzi Trophy, named after Mike Manzi, the local jeweller who made it. A second trophy, the Venus Trophy, is won by the crew which wins the second leg.

== History ==
The race is hosted by Penzance Sailing Club and has been run annually since 1978. The first race was organised on behalf of the yacht club by Richard Wood, Brian Saunders and Colin Harrison, who saw the result of their preparations realised when the first race took place in August 1978. For the first two years the race took place on a single day, with the competitors starting at Penzance, before heading out to cardinal marks at Lowlee and Mountamopus. The crews then travelled south of the Wolf Rock Lighthouse, completed a lap of the Isles of Scilly, passed to the south of the lighthouse again, before finally returning to the starting point at Penzance. This course was used again in 1979, and a third time for a race in 2008 called PASAB 1. This was run in addition to the regular PASAB to celebrate the 30th anniversary of the race.

In 1980 the race was split into two legs, allowing the crews to have an overnight rest on the Scillies. This format was used a second time in 1982, before in 1993 the current three-legged format was adopted.
