= Andalusite =

Aluminium nesosilicate mineral

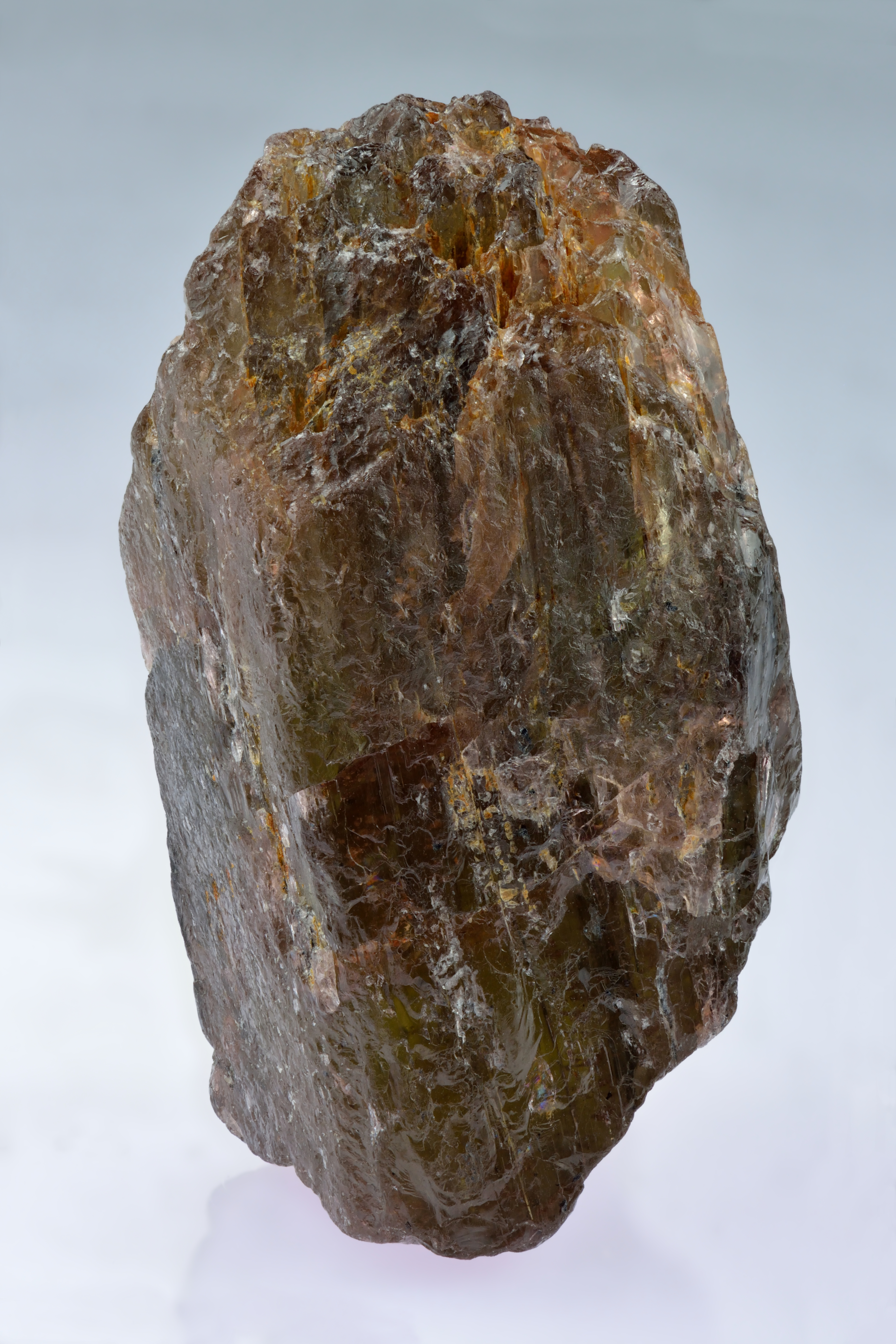
- Andalusite

General
- Category: Nesosilicates
- Formula: Al_{2}SiO_{5}
- IMA symbol: And
- Strunz classification: 9.AF.10
- Crystal system: Orthorhombic
- Crystal class: Dipyramidal (mmm); H-M symbol: (2/m 2/m 2/m)
- Space group: Pnnm
- Unit cell: a = 7.7980 Å, b = 7.9031 Å c = 5.5566 Å; Z = 4

Identification
- Color: Pink, violet, yellow, green, white, gray; in thin section, colorless to pink or green
- Crystal habit: As euhedral crystals or columnar aggregates having nearly square cross sections; fibrous compact to massive
- Twinning: On {101}, rare
- Cleavage: Good on {110}, poor on {100}
- Fracture: uneven to subconchoidal
- Mohs scale hardness: 6.5–7.5
- Luster: Vitreous
- Streak: White
- Diaphaneity: Transparent to nearly opaque with inclusions
- Specific gravity: 3.17 (± .04)
- Optical properties: double refractive, biaxial negative; chiastolite has anomalous aggregate reaction.
- Refractive index: n_{α} = 1.629 – 1.640 n_{β} = 1.633 – 1.644 n_{γ} = 1.638 – 1.650
- Birefringence: δ = 0.009 – 0.010
- Pleochroism: strongly trichroic
- 2V angle: 71–86°
- Dispersion: r < v strong
- Ultraviolet fluorescence: non-fluorescent

Andalusite is an aluminium nesosilicate mineral with the chemical formula Al_{2}SiO_{5}. This mineral was called andalousite by Delamétherie, who thought it came from Andalusia, Spain. It soon became clear that it was a locality error, and that the specimens studied were actually from El Cardoso de la Sierra, in the Spanish province of Guadalajara, not Andalusia.

Andalusite is trimorphic with kyanite and sillimanite, being the lower pressure mid temperature polymorph. At higher temperatures and pressures, andalusite may convert to sillimanite. Thus, as with its other polymorphs, andalusite is an aluminosilicate index mineral, providing clues to depth and pressures involved in producing the host rock.

Phase diagram of Al_{2}SiO_{5}
(aluminosilicates).

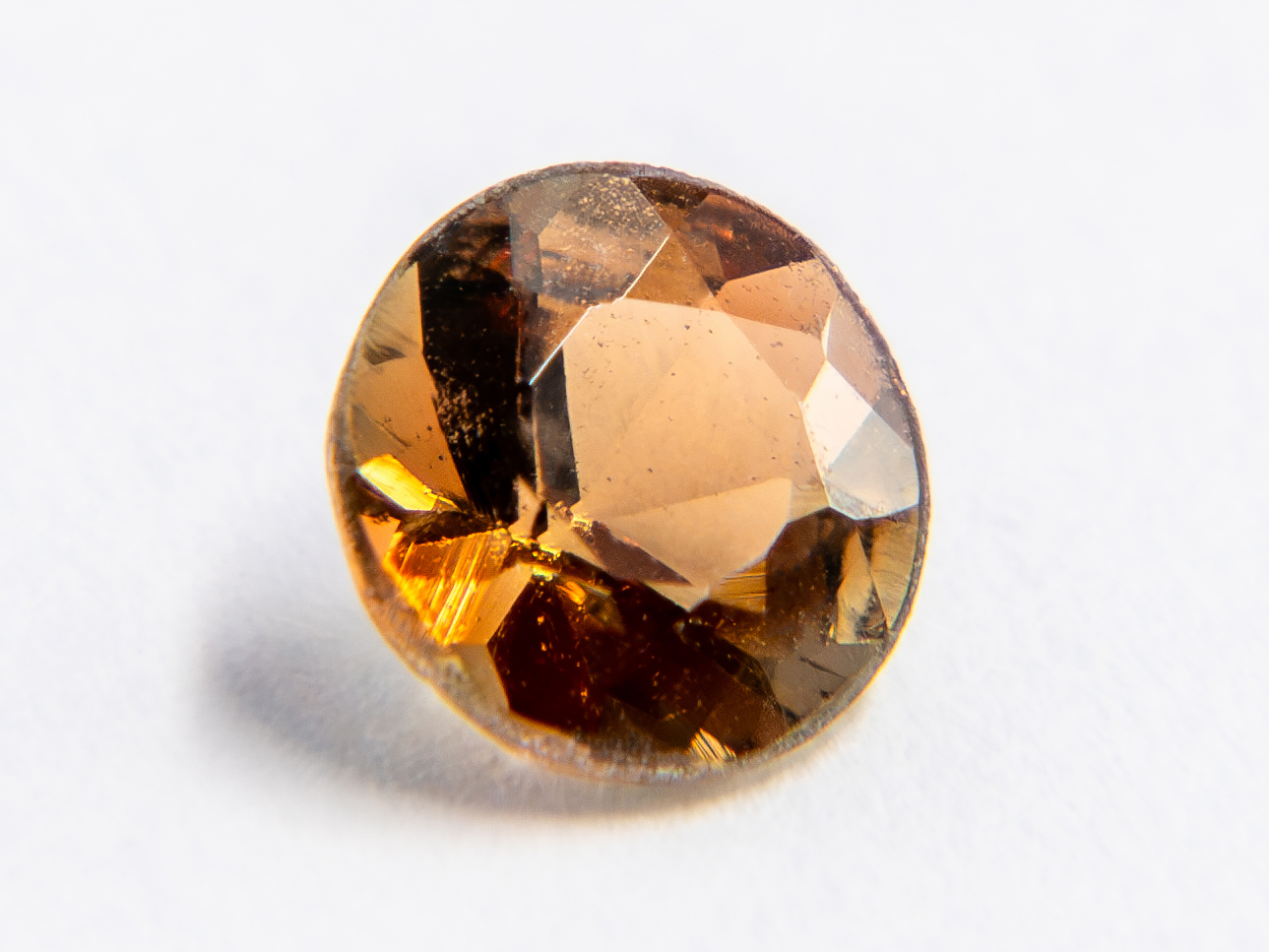
Round faceted andalusite

== Varieties ==
The variety chiastolite commonly contains dark inclusions of carbon or clay which form a cruciform pattern when shown in cross-section. This stone was known at least from the sixteenth century, being taken to many European countries, as a souvenir, by pilgrims returning from Santiago de Compostela.

Viridine is a green variety of andalusite in which manganese 3+ substitutes for aluminium, the same change is also responsible for the colour. Kanonaite is a greenish-black mineral related to andalusite and having the approximate composition (Mn_{0.76}Al_{0.23}Fe_{0.02})AlSiO_{5}.

A clear variety found in Brazil and Sri-Lanka can be cut into a gemstone. Faceted andalusite stones give a play of red, green, and yellow colors that resembles a muted form of iridescence, although the colors are actually the result of unusually strong pleochroism.

== Occurrence ==
Andalusite is a common metamorphic mineral which forms under low pressure and low to high temperatures. The minerals kyanite and sillimanite are polymorphs of andalusite, each occurring under different temperature-pressure regimes and are therefore rarely found together in the same rock. Because of this the three minerals are a useful tool to help identify the pressure-temperature paths of the host rock in which they are found. It is particularly associated with pelitic metamorphic rocks such as mica schist.

The world's highest concentration of andalusite is found in the Glomel mine in Côtes-d'Armor (France) which accounts for 25% of the global production of this mineral. South Africa possesses the largest portion of the world's known andalusite deposits.

== Uses ==
Andalusite is used as a refractory in furnaces, kilns and other industrial processes.

== See also ==
- List of minerals
