= Scillonian Cross =

Flag of the Isles of Scilly

- Proportion: 5:3
- Adopted: February 2002; 24 years ago by popular vote, registered with the Flag Institute
- Design: A white cross over an orange and blue background, with five stars in the upper-right canton.

The Scillonian Cross (Cornish: Baner Syllan) is a unitary authority flag created in 2002 for the Isles of Scilly, United Kingdom. The flag was designed by the Scilly News, and received positive support from its readers in a popular vote, leading to it being officially registered with the Flag Institute as the official flag for the islands.

The flag's design consists of a white cross over an orange and blue background, with five white stars in the upper-right canton. Each part of the design represents a significant element for the Isles of Scilly: the white St Piran's Cross represents Cornwall, the upper orange colour represents the orange-hued sunsets the islands are known for; the lower blue colour represents the surrounding sea around the isles; while the stars represent the isles' locations.

2002 Scilly News poll options

Winner (+60 points)

Second place (+17 points)

Third place (+5 points)

Fourth place (+2 points)

Fifth place (-4 points)

Sixth place (-6 points)

Seventh place (-7 points)

Eighth place (-11 points)

Ninth place (-16 points)
