= Penzance Sailing Club =

Sailing club in Cornwall, United Kingdom

- Burgee

- Ensign
- Short name: PZSC
- Founded: 1939; 87 years ago
- Location: Penzance, Cornwall
- Website: www.pzsc.org.uk

Original burgee of Penzance Sailing Club, replaced with the current version in the 1990s

Penzance Sailing Club runs both dinghy and yacht sailing from its base in Penzance, Cornwall, UK. The club's clubhouse is located on the Albert Pier within Penzance harbour. The club was formed by seven individuals in 1939 who bought "West of England Redwinds" to sail in Penzance. Postwar the club's dinghy fleets grew until in the 1970s a yacht fleet was added both of which continue today.

The club was the original starting point for the Mini Transat 6.50 transatlantic yacht races, hosting the first four events from 1977 to 1983. Since 1978 Penzance Sailing Club has run the PASAB (Penzance Around Scilly and Back) yacht race which is a race to the Isles of Scilly.
