= Martinho Campos =

Town in the state of Minas Gerais, Brazil

Coordinates: 19°19′55″S 45°14′13″W

- Municipality
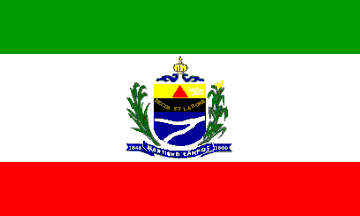
- Flag
- Interactive map of Martinho Campos
- Country: Brazil
- State: Minas Gerais
- Region: Southeast

Population (2022 Census)
  - Total: 14,003
  - Estimate (2025): 14,546
- Time zone: UTC−3 (BRT)

Location of Martinho Campos on a map of the state of Minas Gerais

Martinho Campos is a Brazilian municipality located in the center of the state of Minas Gerais. Its population as of 2025 was 14,546 people living in a total area of 1,058 km^{2} (408 sq mi). The city belongs to the meso-region of Central Mineira and to the micro-region of Bom Despacho. It became a municipality in 1938.

== Geography ==
The city center of Martinho Campos is located at an elevation of 699 meters on federal highway BR-357, in the upper valley of the São Francisco River. Neighboring municipalities are: Abaté (N), Pompeu (E), Pitangui (SE), Leandro Ferreira and Bom Despacho (S), Dores do Indaiá and Quartel Geral (W).

Distances

- Belo Horizonte: 183 km on BR-357 and BR-29
- Bom Despacho: 43 km on MG-164
- Abaeté: 25 km on BR-352
- Pompéu: 30 km on MG-164

== Economic activities ==
Services, small industries, and agriculture are the most important economic activities. Charcoal obtained from eucalyptus plantations was especially important in the local economy. In 2005 there were 31 extractive industries employing 163 workers, 74 small transformation industries employing 1,264 workers and 235 retail units employing 569 workers. The GDP in 2005 was approximately R$91 million, with 44 million reais from services, 10 million reais from industry, and 31 million reais from agriculture. There were 473 rural producers on 55,000 hectares of land. 99 farms had tractors (2006). Approximately 1,200 persons were occupied in agriculture. The main crops are rice, sugarcane, manioc, beans soybeans, and corn. There were 57,000 head of cattle, of which 16,000 were milk cows (2006).

There were 6 banks: Banco do Brasil - Caixa Econômica Federal - Banco Itaú - Bradesco - Credindaiá - Coopcredi (2007). In the vehicle fleet there were 2,290 automobiles, 180 trucks, 352 pickup trucks, 18 buses, and 556 motorcycles (2007).

== Health and education ==
In the health sector there were 4 public health clinics and 1 hospital (A Santa Casa de Misericórdia Dr. Zacarias) with 42 beds. (2005). There are 4 private doctors. Patients with more serious health conditions are transported to Divinópolis or Belo Horizonte. Educational needs of 3,200 students were met by 7 primary schools, 2 middle schools, and 6 pre-primary schools.

- Municipal Human Development Index: 0.748 (2000)
- State ranking: 270 out of 853 municipalities as of 2000
- National ranking: 1836 out of 5,138 municipalities as of 2000
- Literacy rate: 86%
- Life expectancy: 70 (average of males and females)

In 2000 the per capita monthly income of R$239.00 was above the state average of R$276.00 and below the national average of R$297.00. Poços de Caldas had the highest per capita monthly income in 2000 with R$435.00. The lowest was Setubinha with R$73.00.

The highest ranking municipality in Minas Gerais in 2000 was Poços de Caldas with 0.841, while the lowest was Setubinha with 0.568. Nationally the highest was São Caetano do Sul in São Paulo with 0.919, while the lowest was Setubinha. In more recent statistics (considering 5,507 municipalities) Manari in the state of Pernambuco has the lowest rating in the country—0,467—putting it in last place.

== See also ==
- List of municipalities in Minas Gerais
