= Pompéu =

Coordinates: 19°13′24″S 45°00′12″W

- Municipality
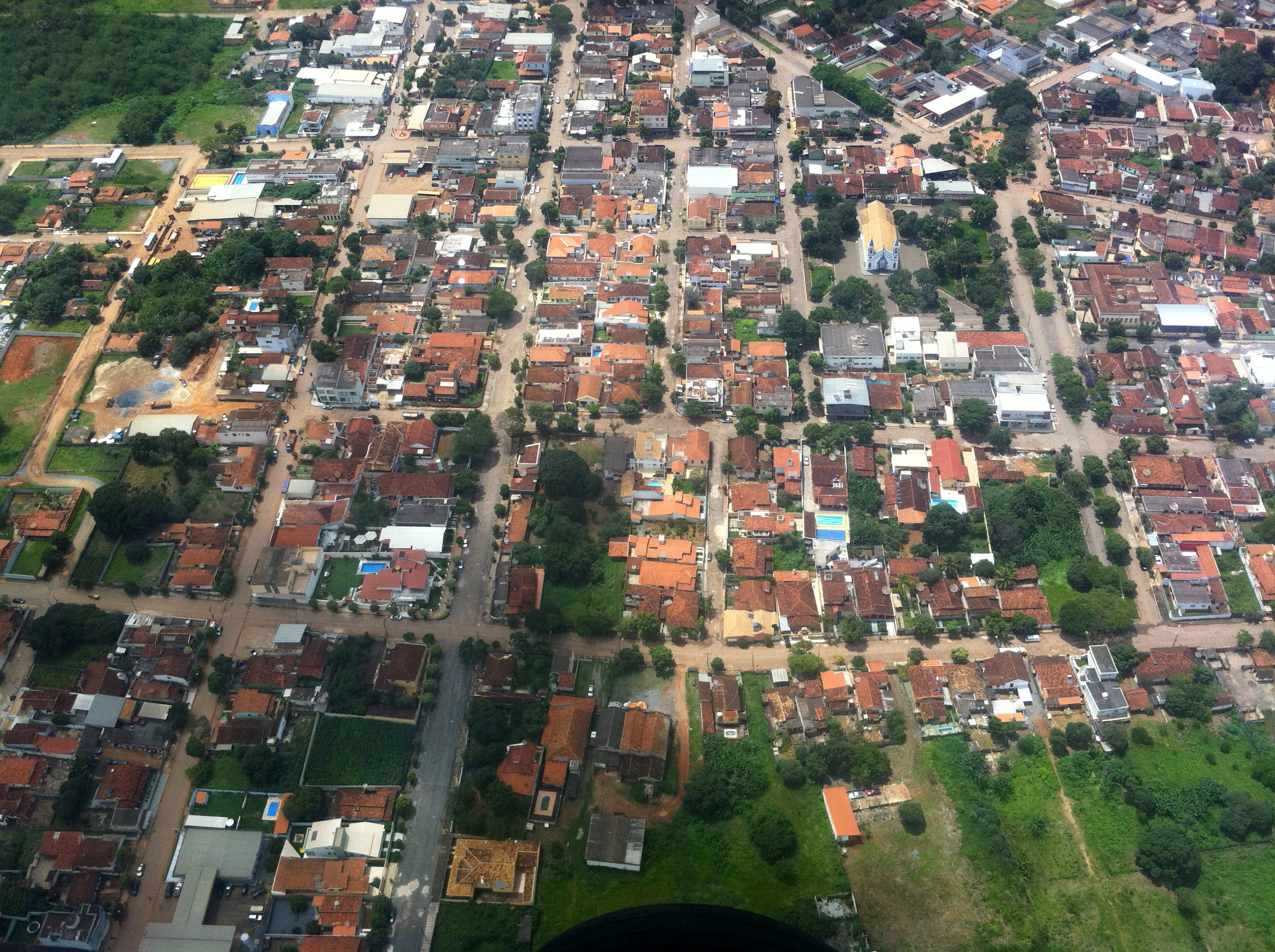
- Aerial View from downtown Pompéu (2012)
- Interactive map of Pompéu
- Country: Brazil
- Region: Southeast
- State: Minas Gerais

Area
  - Total: 2,551.07 km^{2} (984.97 sq mi)

Population (2022 Census)
  - Total: 31,047
  - Estimate (2025): 32,441
  - Density: 1,141/km^{2} (2,960/sq mi)
- Demonym: Pompeano
- Time zone: UTC−3 (BRT)
- Area code: (+55) 37
- Website: Pompéu, MG

Pompéu is a municipality in the north of the Brazilian state of Minas Gerais. As of 2025 the population was 32,441 in a total area of 2,551 km^{2}. It became a municipality in 1938.

== Geography ==
Pompéu belongs to the statistical micro-region of Três Marias. The municipal seat is located at an elevation of 657 meters between the Pará River and the São Francisco River. Neighboring municipalities are Felixlândia (N), Abaeté (W), Martinho Campos, Papagaios, and Pitangui (S), and Curvelo (E).

=== Distances ===
- Angueretá on BR-040: 44 km
- Martinho Campos: 20 km
- Belo Horizonte: 181 km
- Brasília: 650 km

Connections to the north and south are made on MG-415.

=== Climate ===
The average yearly temperature is 22.1 °C; the average yearly maximum is 29.2 °C; and the average yearly minimum is 16,4 °C.

Climate data for Pompéu (1981–2010)
Month	Jan	Feb	Mar	Apr	May	Jun	Jul	Aug	Sep	Oct	Nov	Dec	Year
Mean daily maximum °C (°F)	30.3 (86.5)	31.1 (88.0)	30.6 (87.1)	30.0 (86.0)	28.0 (82.4)	27.3 (81.1)	27.6 (81.7)	29.2 (84.6)	30.9 (87.6)	31.6 (88.9)	30.2 (86.4)	29.7 (85.5)	29.7 (85.5)
Daily mean °C (°F)	24.3 (75.7)	24.7 (76.5)	24.1 (75.4)	23.2 (73.8)	20.6 (69.1)	19.3 (66.7)	19.4 (66.9)	21.2 (70.2)	23.2 (73.8)	24.7 (76.5)	24.2 (75.6)	24.0 (75.2)	22.7 (72.9)
Mean daily minimum °C (°F)	19.9 (67.8)	19.6 (67.3)	19.2 (66.6)	17.5 (63.5)	14.4 (57.9)	12.4 (54.3)	12.3 (54.1)	13.9 (57.0)	16.4 (61.5)	18.8 (65.8)	19.5 (67.1)	19.8 (67.6)	17.0 (62.6)
Average precipitation mm (inches)	250.3 (9.85)	156.2 (6.15)	167.8 (6.61)	49.3 (1.94)	27.2 (1.07)	8.0 (0.31)	7.4 (0.29)	12.7 (0.50)	30.2 (1.19)	63.7 (2.51)	190.2 (7.49)	276.3 (10.88)	1,239.3 (48.79)
Average precipitation days (≥ 1.0 mm)	15	11	11	5	3	1	1	2	4	7	13	16	89
Average relative humidity (%)	75.1	73.7	75	71.4	71.1	66.1	62.8	56.9	57.1	59.8	71.6	77.8	68.2
Mean monthly sunshine hours	176.5	186.0	203.1	226.0	222.5	204.4	228.5	226.1	203.8	203.5	164.6	164.7	2,409.7
Source: Instituto Nacional de Meteorologia

== Economic activities ==
The most important economic activities are cattle raising, alcohol production, mining of slate, furniture, clothing, and food and drink manufacture, forestry for production of charcoal, and agriculture. The GDP in 2005 was R$ R$223 million of which 97 million came from services, 37 million from industry, and 74 million from agriculture. Pompéu is in the middle tier of municipalities in the state with regard to economic and social development. As of 2007 there were 02 banking agencies in the town. There was a small retail infrastructure serving the surrounding area of cattle and agricultural lands. There were 2,591 automobiles in all of the municipality (2007), about one for every 11 inhabitants.

Working population by economic sector

- Agriculture, charcoal extraction, and fishing: 2,788
- Industry: 2,913
- Commerce and Merchandise: 1,649
- Services: 3,754
- TOTAL: 11,104

In the rural area there were 732 establishments occupying 142,000 hectares (planted area, 18,000 ha; natural pasture, 82,000 ha.; and woodland, 47,000 ha.) (2006). About 2,600 persons were employed in agriculture. 214 of the farms had tractors, a ratio of one in three farms. There were 88,000 head of cattle in 2006, of which 28,000 were milking cows. The main crops were sugarcane and corn. A major agricultural activity is extraction of charcoal, which is shipped by truck to be used in the industries of the Belo Horizonte region.

== Health and education ==
In the health sector there were 15 health clinics and 01 hospital with 33 beds. In the educational sector there were 12 pre-primary schools, 21 primary schools, and 04 middle schools.

- Municipal Human Development Index: 0.746 (2000)
- State ranking: 319 out of 853 municipalities as of 2000
- National ranking: 2,006 out of 5,138 municipalities as of 2000
- Literacy rate: 85%
- Life expectancy: 70 (average of males and females)

The highest ranking municipality in Minas Gerais in 2000 was Poços de Caldas with 0.841, while the lowest was Setubinha with 0.568. Nationally the highest was São Caetano do Sul in São Paulo with 0.919, while the lowest was Setubinha. In more recent statistics (considering 5,507 municipalities) Manari in the state of Pernambuco has the lowest rating in the country—0,467—putting it in last place.

== History ==
Pompéu is the birthplace of Dona Joaquina de Pompéu (Joaquina Maria Bernarda da Silva de Abreu Castelo Branco Souto Mayor de Oliveira Campos), historical figure and matriarch of all the west of Minas Gerais. The town began with Pouso dos Buritis, a resting place for the muleteers who travelled from Montes Claros to the Northeast of Minas Gerais.

Pompéu only became an official settlement in 1840 with the name Buriti da Estrada. In 1938 it became a city with the name of Pompéu, paying homage to its first inhabitant, Antônio Pompeu Taques.

== See also ==
- List of municipalities in Minas Gerais
