= Verdete =

Verdete is a type of slate rock found in Brazil.

Major deposits are found in the state of Minas Gerais.

The term verdete is the local name for occurrences of a greenish rock that is high in both potassium and iron. The main potassium bearing minerals are glauconite and muscovite.
