= Luz, Minas Gerais =

Luz
- Municipality
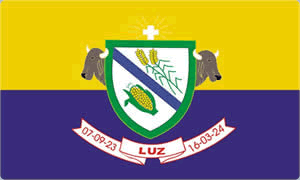
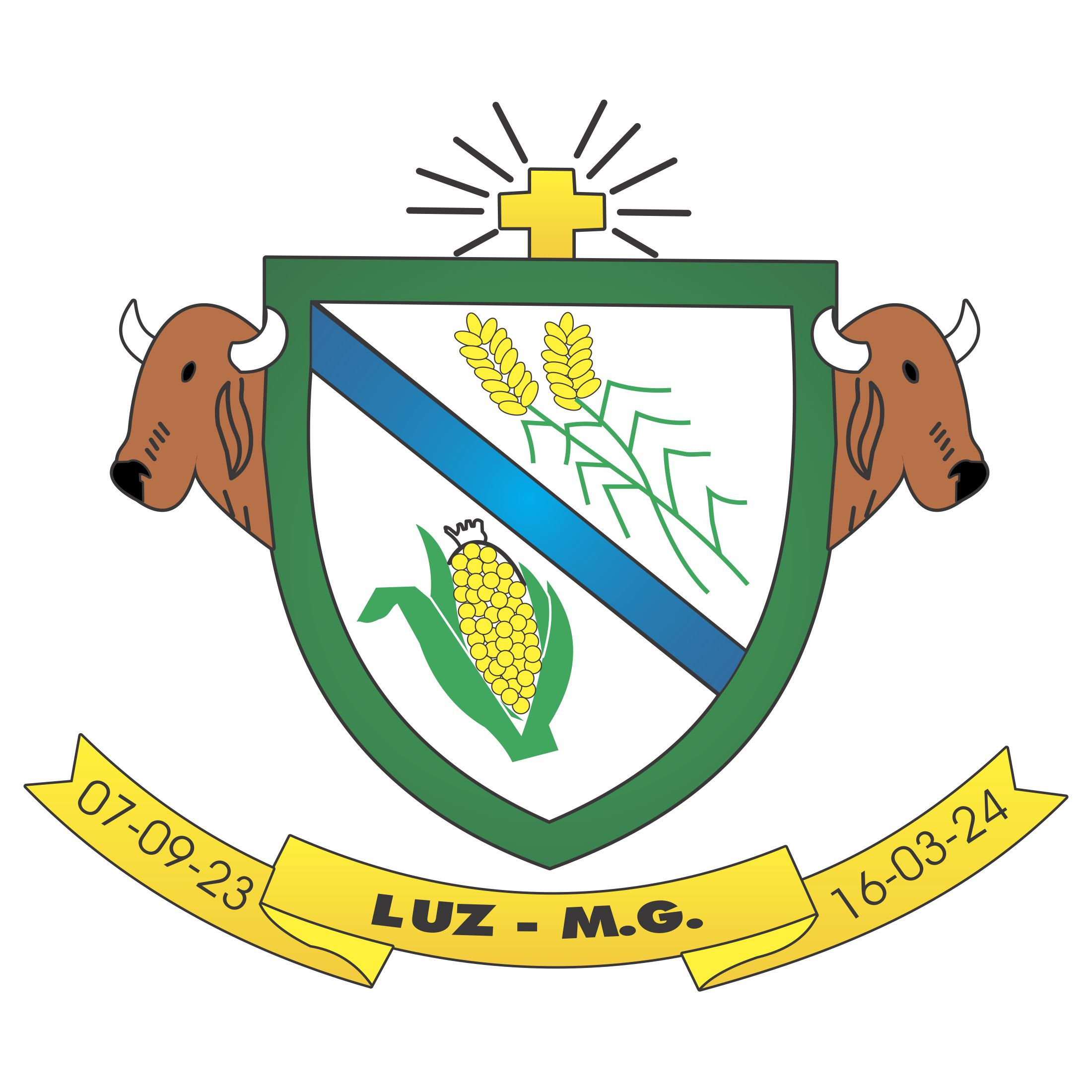
- Flag Coat of arms

- Location in Minas Gerais state

- Location in Brazil
- Coordinates: 19°48′3″S 45°41′9″W
- Country: Brazil
- Region: Southeast
- State: Minas Gerais
- Mesoregion: Central Mineira
- Microregion: Bom Despacho

Area
  - Total: 1,172 km^{2} (453 sq mi)

Population (2022 Census)
  - Total: 17,875
  - Estimate (2025): 18,336
  - Density: 15.25/km^{2} (39.50/sq mi)
- Time zone: UTC−3 (BRT)

Luz is a Brazilian municipality located in the West (south of the west) part of the state of Minas Gerais. Luz is located between the city of Araxá and the capital city of the state of Minas Gerais, Belo Horizonte. The population is 18,336 (2025 est.) in an area of 1172 km^{2}. The city belongs to the Central Mineira region and to the micro-region of Bom Despacho. It became a municipality in 1923.

== Origin of the name ==
In the region there was a spring with a dam that supplied water to the small settlement that had grown around a chapel dedicated to Our Lady of the Light, or Nossa Senhora da Luz. The first name of the town was Nossa Senhora da Luz do Aterrado, or Our Lady of the Light of the Dam.

== Geography ==
=== Location ===
The city center of Luz is located at an elevation of 675 meters a short distance south of federal highway BR-262. The São Francisco River lies to the east. Neighboring municipalities are: Estrela do Indaiá and Dores do Indaiá (N), Bom Despacho (NE), Moema and Lagoa da Prata (E), Japaraíba (SE), Arcos and Iguatama (S), Bambuí and Córrego Danta (W). *

Distances

- Belo Horizonte: 188 km on BR-262
- Bom Despacho: 50 km east on BR-262
- Dores do Indaiá: 36 km north on MG-176
- Brasília: 640 km
- Rio de Janeiro: 635 km
- São Paulo: 595 km

=== Geographical data ===
Elevation

- Maximum: 956 m (Serra Deus me Livre)
- Minimum: 680 m (Foz do Ribeirão Jorge Grande)
- Center of the city: 674.96 m

Temperature

- Average annual: 22.1 °C
- Average annual maximum: 29.1 °C
- Average annual minimum: 16.7 °C

Rainfall

- Average annual rainfall: 1,415.7 mm

Topography

- Flat: 40%
- Hilly: 50%
- Mountainous: 10%

Rivers

- Ribeirão Jorge Pequeno
- Rio São Francisco
- River basin: Basin of the Rio São Francisco

== Economic activities ==
Services, small industries, and agriculture are the most important economic activities. Charcoal production from eucalyptus plantations is also important. In 2005 there were 78 transformation industries employing 540 workers and 342 retail units employing 926 workers. The GDP in 2005 was approximately R$158 million, with 11 million from taxes, 77 million reais from services, 17 million reais from industry, and 52 million reais from agriculture. There were 651 rural producers on 69,000 hectares of land. 183 farms had tractors (2006). Approximately 1700 persons were occupied in agriculture. The main crops are coffee, rice, beans, and corn. There were 96,000 head of cattle, of which 24,000 were milk cows (2006).

There were 5 banks (2007): Banco Bradesco (Banco Postal, Correios), Banco do Brasil, Banco Itaú, Caixa Econômica Federal, Crediluz (Cooperativa de Crédito dos Produtores Rurais de Luz). There were 3 hotels: Hotel Turista, Hotel Oeste, and Hotel Planalto.

In the vehicle fleet there were 2632 automobiles, 252 trucks, 326 pickup trucks, 19 buses, 43 micro-buses, and 857 motorcycles (2007).

== Health and education ==
In the health sector there were 8 public health clinics and 1 private hospital with 56 beds. (2005). Patients with more serious health conditions are transported to Belo Horizonte. Educational needs of 3800 students were met by 10 primary schools, 2 middle schools, and 4 pre-primary schools.

- Municipal Human Development Index: 0.801 (2000)
- State ranking: 35 out of 853 municipalities as of 2000
- National ranking: 537 out of 5,138 municipalities as of 2000
- Literacy rate: 90%
- Life expectancy: 71 (average of males and females)

In 2000 the per capita monthly income of R$369.00 was above the state average of R$276.00 and below the national average of R$297.00. Poços de Caldas had the highest per capita monthly income in 2000 with R$435.00. The lowest was Setubinha with R$73.00.

The highest ranking municipality in Minas Gerais in 2000 was Poços de Caldas with 0.841, while the lowest was Setubinha with 0.568. Nationally the highest was São Caetano do Sul in São Paulo with 0.919, while the lowest was Setubinha. In more recent statistics (considering 5,507 municipalities) Manari in the state of Pernambuco has the lowest rating in the country—0,467—putting it in last place.

== Notable people ==
- Vicente Joaquim Zico, former archbishop of Belém do Pará

== See also ==
- List of municipalities in Minas Gerais
