= Quartel Geral =

Town and municipality in the state of Minas Gerais, Brazil

Coordinates: 19°16′26″S 45°33′25″W

- Municipality
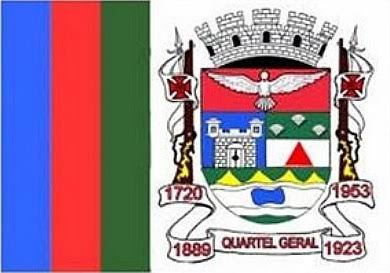
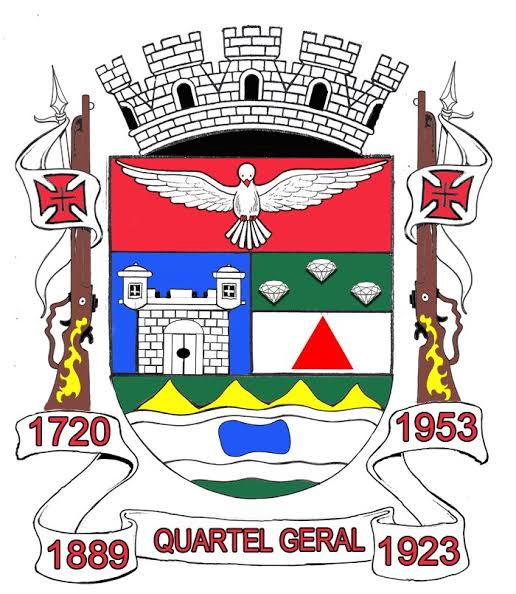
- Flag Coat of arms
- Interactive map of Quartel Geral
- Country: Brazil
- State: Minas Gerais
- Region: Southeast

Population (2022 Census)
  - Total: 3,179
  - Estimate (2025): 3,232
- Time zone: UTC−3 (BRT)

Location of Quartel Geral on a map of the state of Minas Gerais

Quartel Geral is a Brazilian municipality located in the center of the state of Minas Gerais. Its population as of 2025 was 3,232 people living in a total area of 556 km^{2}. The city belongs to the meso-region of Central Mineira and to the micro-region of Bom Despacho. It became a municipality in 1953.

== Geography ==
The city center of Quartel Geral is located at an elevation of 691 meters on state highway MG-170, 8 km south of its junction with federal highway BR-262. Neighboring municipalities are: Cedro do Abaeté and Abaeté (N), Martinho Campos (E), Dores do Indaiá and Serra da Saudade (S), and Lagoa da Prata (S), São Gotardo and Tiros (W).

Distances

- Belo Horizonte: 240 km
- Bom Despacho: 112 km south on MG-176, then east on BR-262
- Dores do Indaiá: 24 km south on MG-176
- Abaeté: 18 km north on MG-176

== Economic activities ==
Services and agriculture are the most important economic activities. In 2005 there were 11 small transformation industries employing 54 workers while 199 workers were employed in public administration. The GDP in 2005 was approximately R$23 million, with 1 million from taxes, 10 million reais from services, 2 million reais from industry, and 9 million reais from agriculture. There were 269 rural producers on 34,000 hectares of land. 39 farms had tractors (2006). Approximately 500 persons were employed in agriculture. The main crops are coffee, beans and corn. There were 23,000 head of cattle (2006) of which 5,000 were dairy cattle.

There were no banks(2007). In the vehicle fleet there were 266 automobiles, 34 trucks, 26 pickup trucks, 6 micro-buses, 91 motorcycles, and 2 buses. (2007).

== Health and education ==
In the health sector there was 1 public health clinic. (2005). Patients with more serious health conditions are transported to Divinópolis or Belo Horizonte. Educational needs of 700 students were met by 5 primary schools, 1 middle school, and 2 pre-primary schools.

- Municipal Human Development Index: 0.713 (2000)
- State ranking: 484 out of 853 municipalities as of 2000
- National ranking: 2745 out of 5,138 municipalities as of 2000
- Literacy rate: 79%
- Life expectancy: 70 (average of males and females)

In 2000 the per capita monthly income of R$171.00 was below the state average of R$276.00 and below the national average of R$297.00. Poços de Caldas had the highest per capita monthly income in 2000 with R$435.00. The lowest was Setubinha with R$73.00.

The highest ranking municipality in Minas Gerais in 2000 was Poços de Caldas with 0.841, while the lowest was Setubinha with 0.568. Nationally the highest was São Caetano do Sul in São Paulo with 0.919, while the lowest was Setubinha. In more recent statistics (considering 5,507 municipalities) Manari in the state of Pernambuco has the lowest rating in the country—0,467—putting it in last place.

== See also ==
- List of municipalities in Minas Gerais
