= Greensand =

Sand or sandstone which has a greenish color

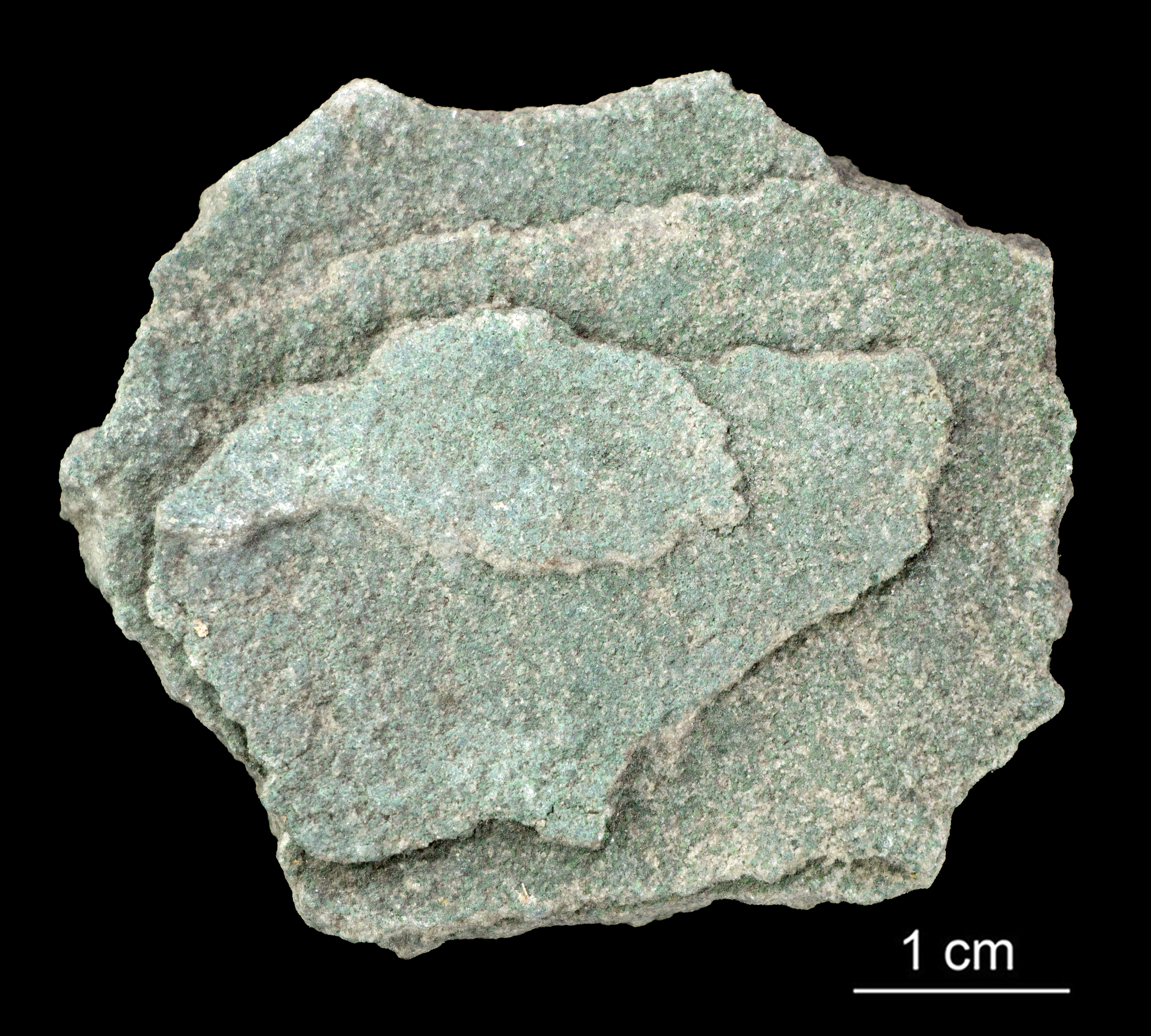
Greensand (glauconitic sandstone)

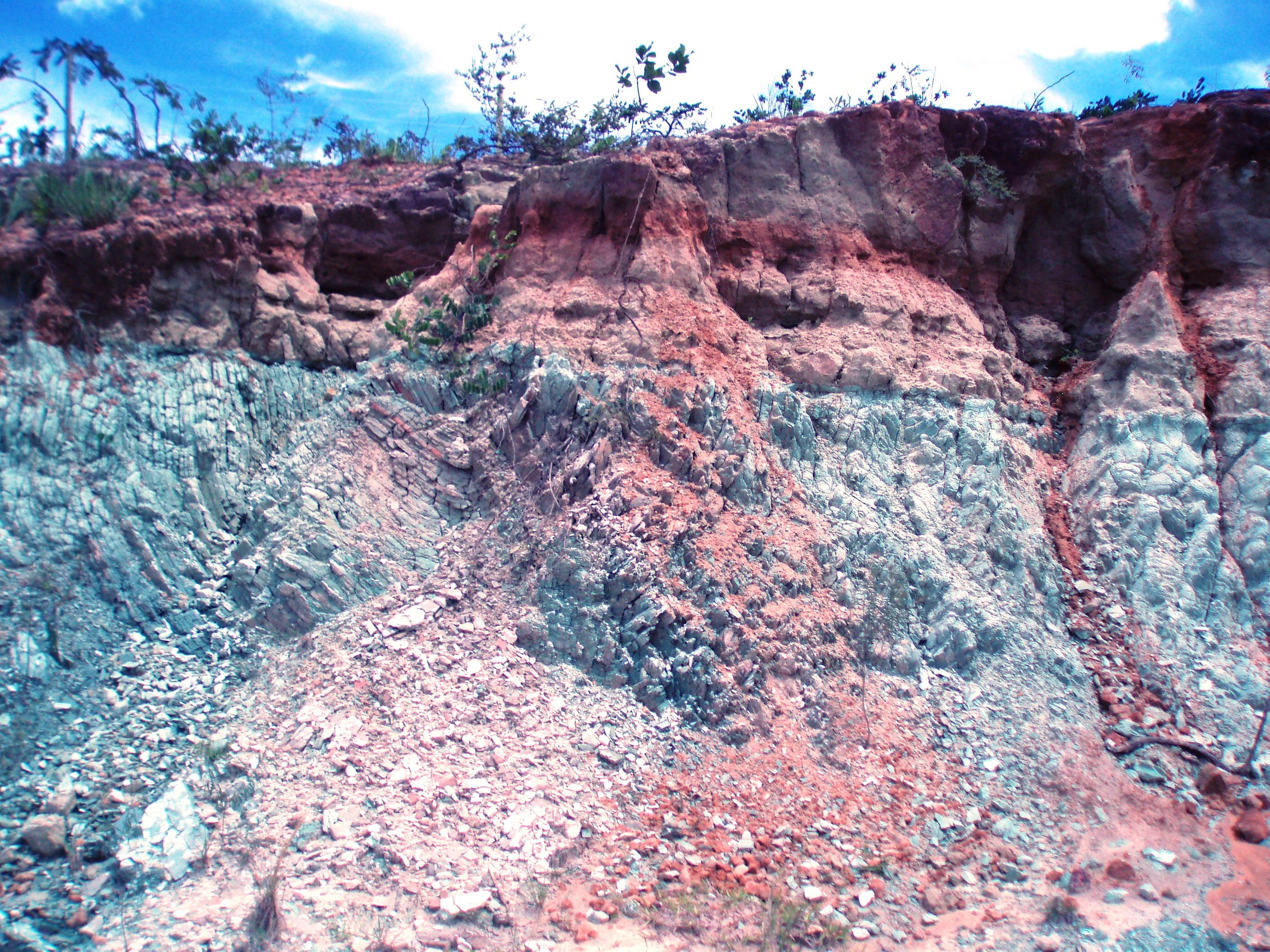
Occurrence of glauconitic siltstone in the Serra da Saudade ridge, in the Alto Paranaíba region, Minas Gerais, Brazil

Greensand or green sand is a sand or sandstone which has a greenish color. This term is specifically applied to shallow marine sediment that contains noticeable quantities of rounded greenish grains. These grains are called glauconies and consist of a mixture of mixed-layer clay minerals, such as smectite and glauconite. Greensand is also loosely applied to any glauconitic sediment.

== Formation ==
Greensand forms in anoxic marine environments that are rich in organic detritus and low in sedimentary input. Having accumulated in marine environments, greensands can be fossil-rich, such as in the late-Cretaceous deposits of New Jersey, United States.

== Occurrence ==
Important exposures are known from both northern and western Europe, North America, southeastern Brazil and north Africa. Well known and important greensands are the Upper and Lower Greensands of England and occur within Eocene and Cretaceous sedimentary strata underlying the coastal plains of New Jersey and Delaware in the United States. Although greensand has been found throughout Phanerozoic and Late Precambrian sedimentary deposits, it appears to be most common in Eocene, Cambrian, and Cretaceous sedimentary deposits.

=== Brazil ===
In Brazil, greensand refers to a fertilizer produced from glauconitic siltstone units belonging to the Serra da Saudade Formation, Bambuí Group, of Neoproterozoic/Ediacaran age. The outcrops occur in the Serra da Saudade ridge, in Alto Paranaíba region, Minas Gerais. It is a silt-clay sedimentary rock, laminated, bluish-green, composed of glauconite (40–80%), potassium feldspar (10–15%), quartz (10–60%), muscovite (5%) and minor quantities of biotite (2%), goethite (<1%), titanium and manganese oxides (<1%), barium phosphate and rare-earth elements phosphates (<1%).

Enriched levels of potash have K_{2}O grades between 8% and 12%, thickness up to 50 m (160 ft) and are associated to the glauconitic levels, dark green in color. Glauconite is authigenic and highly mature. The high concentration of this mineral is related to a depositional environment with a low sedimentation rate. The glauconitic siltstone has resulted from a high level flooding event in the Bambuí Basin. The sedimentary provenance is from supracrustal feldsic elements on a continental margin environment with an acidic magmatic arc (foreland basin).

=== Great Britain ===
In Great Britain, greensand usually refers to specific rock strata of Early Cretaceous age. A distinction is made between the Upper Greensand and Lower Greensand. The term greensand was originally applied by William Smith to glauconitic sandstones in the west of England and subsequently used for the similar deposits of the Weald, before it was appreciated that the latter are actually two distinct formations separated by the Gault Clay. The Upper Greensand was also once known as either the "Malm" or "Malm Rock Of Western Sussex".

Both Upper and Lower Greensand outcrops appear in the scarp slopes surrounding the London Basin and the Weald. Prominent seams are to be found in the Vale of White Horse, in Bedfordshire, in Kent, Surrey, the South Downs National Park, elsewhere in Hampshire, the Isle of Wight, and Dorset, including the north part of the county and the Jurassic Coast. Some minor seams are found further west in Devon in the Blackdown and Haldon hills.

The soil of the greensand is quite varied, ranging from fertile to fairly sterile. On the fertile soils chestnut and stands of hazel and oak are common, while Scots pine and birch colonise the poorer soils. These Greensand Ridges are popular long distance walking routes, for instance the Greensand Way in Kent and Surrey.

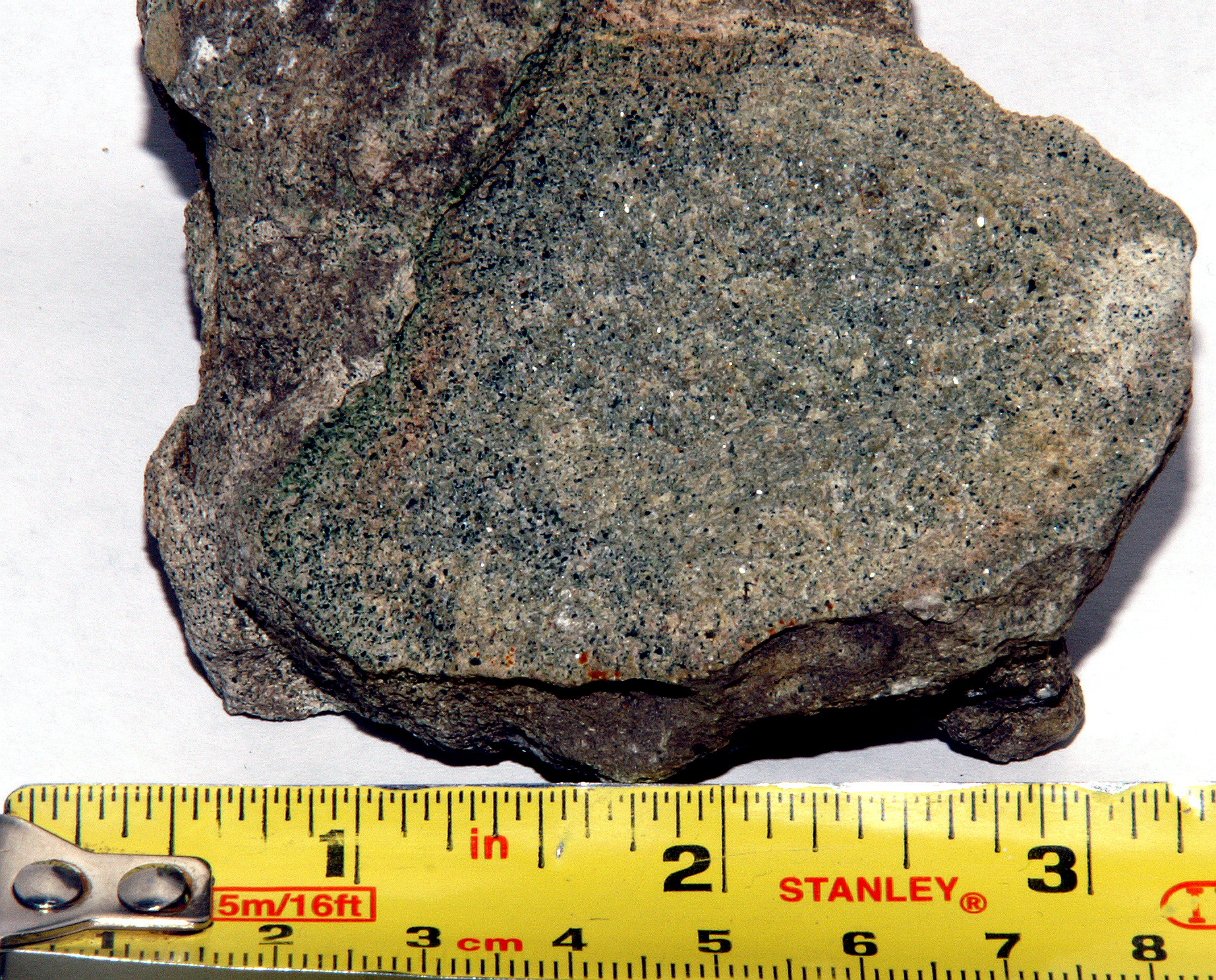
A sample of Cretaceous greensand from near Swanage, Dorset

==== Lower Greensand ====
The Lower Greensand (known as the Woburn Sand north of the London Basin) is of Aptian age. In the Weald the Lower Greensand consists of four deposits which are partly diachronous: the Atherfield Clay 5–15 m (15–50 ft) thick, the Folkestone Beds 20–80 m (60–250 ft) thick; the Hythe beds 20–110 m (60–350 ft) thick and the Sandgate Beds 2–37 m (5–120 ft) thick. Although it appears both north and south of the London Basin it is not present everywhere beneath the Chalk Group which underlies the basin; the Gault lies directly on eroded Jurassic or Devonian rocks under much of the area.

==== Upper Greensand ====
The Upper Greensand is of Albian age. It represents a sandy lithofacies deposited in areas of stronger currents than the Gault Clay. Like the Lower Greensand it is not present beneath the whole of the London Basin, apparently passing laterally into Gault clay east of a line between Dunstable and Tatsfield and of uncertain extent to the east of London.

Outcrops of the Upper Greensand occur in the southwest of England including the Blackdown Hills and East Devon Plateau and the Haldon Hills, remnants of a once much wider extent.

== Properties and uses ==
The green color of greensand is due to variable amounts of the mineral glauconite, an iron potassium silicate with very low weathering resistance; as a result, greensand tends to be weak and friable. It is a common ingredient as a source of potassium in organic gardening and farming fertilisers. Greensand glauconite is used as a water softener for its chemical-exchange properties. Greensand coated with manganese oxide (called manganese greensand) is used in well water treatment systems to remove dissolved (reduced) iron and manganese with the addition of an oxidant, usually potassium permanganate, under controlled pH conditions. It is also used as a type of rock for stone walls in areas where greensand is common.

In Roman times in Britain, coarse grits derived from the lower greensand were used to line the inner surface of mortars (grinding bowls) produced in Oxfordshire pottery kilns.

Recently, glauconitic greensand has become a popular organic soil amendment. The porous properties of glauconite greensand allows for the absorption of water and minerals, making irrigation and nutrient delivery much more efficient (see soil conditioner). Greensand can be used to absorb excess water in clay-rich soils and to prevent water loss in sandy soils.

== See also ==
- Glauconite
