= Araújos =

Brazilian municipality in Minas Gerais state

Coordinates: 19°56′52″S 45°09′57″W

- Municipality
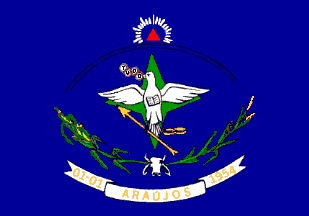
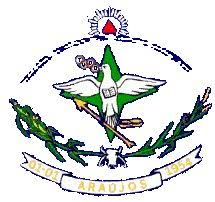
- Flag Coat of arms
- Interactive map of Araújos
- Country: Brazil
- State: Minas Gerais
- Region: Southeast

Population (2022 Census)
  - Total: 9,199
  - Estimate (2025): 9,634
- Time zone: UTC−3 (BRT)

Location of Araujos on a map of the state of Minas Gerais

Araújos is a Brazilian municipality located in the center of the state of Minas Gerais. Its population as of 2025 was 9,634 people living in a total area of 245 km^{2} (95 sq mi). The city belongs to the meso-region of Central Mineira and to the micro-region of Bom Despacho. It became a municipality in 1954.

== Geography ==
The city center of Araújos is located at an elevation of 821 meters about halfway between Divinópolis and Bom Despacho. Neighboring municipalities are: Bom Despacho (N) and (NW), Leandro Ferreira (NE), Nova Serrana and Pedigão (E), Santo Antônio do Monte (S) and (SW).

The distance to Belo Horizonte is 163 km. The distance to regional center Bom Despacho is 32 km. Connections are made by state highway MG-252 and MG-164. The distance to Divinópolis is 49 km.

== Economy ==
Services and agriculture are the most important economic activities. In 2005 there were 158 small transformation industries employing 821 workers. The GDP in 2005 was approximately R$40 million, with 23 million reais from services, 5 million reais from industry, and 10 million reais from agriculture. There were 351 rural producers on 16,000 hectares of land. 46 farms had tractors (2006). Approximately 700 persons were employed in agriculture. The main crops are beans and corn. There were 18,000 head of cattle (2006).

There was one bank (2007). In the vehicle fleet there were 1,089 automobiles, 92 trucks, 149 pickup trucks, and 542 motorcycles (2007).

== Health and education ==
In the health sector there were 8 public health clinics, 4 of which were specialized. (2005). Patients with more serious health conditions are transported to Divinópolis or Belo Horizonte. Educational needs of 1,900 students were met by 6 primary schools, 1 middle school, and 2 pre-primary schools.

- Municipal Human Development Index: 0.755 (2000)
- State ranking: 244 out of 853 municipalities as of 2000
- National ranking: 1718 out of 5,138 municipalities as of 2000
- Literacy rate: 87%
- Life expectancy: 72 (average of males and females)

In 2000 the per capita monthly income of R$213.00 below the state and national average of R$276.00 and R$297.00 respectively. Poços de Caldas had the highest per capita monthly income in 2000 with R$435.00. The lowest was Setubinha with R$73.00.

The highest ranking municipality in Minas Gerais in 2000 was Poços de Caldas with 0.841, while the lowest was Setubinha with 0.568. Nationally the highest was São Caetano do Sul in São Paulo with 0.919, while the lowest was Setubinha. In more recent statistics (considering 5,507 municipalities) Manari in the state of Pernambuco has the lowest rating in the country—0,467—putting it in last place.

== See also ==
- List of municipalities in Minas Gerais
