= Moema, Minas Gerais =

Brazilian municipality

Coordinates: 19°50′34″S 45°24′39″W

- Municipality
- Interactive map of Moema, Minas Gerais
- Country: Brazil
- State: Minas Gerais
- Region: Southeast

Population (2022 Census)
  - Total: 7,548
  - Estimate (2025): 7,812
- Time zone: UTC−3 (BRT)

Location of Moema on a map of the state of Minas Gerais

Moema is a Brazilian municipality located in the center of the state of Minas Gerais. Its population as of 2025 was 7,812 people living in a total area of 203 km^{2} (78 sq mi). The city belongs to the meso-region of Central Mineira and to the micro-region of Bom Despacho. It became a municipality in 1953.

== Geography ==
The city center of Moema is located at an elevation of 728 meters on state highway MG-170, 8 km south of its junction with federal highway BR-262. Neighboring municipalities are: Bom Despacho (N)and (E), Santo Antônio do Monte and Lagoa da Prata (S), Luz (W).

Distances

- Belo Horizonte: 170 km
- Bom Despacho: 24 km
- Lagoa da Prata: 24 km
- Formiga: 90 km

== Economic activities ==
Services and agriculture are the most important economic activities. In 2005 there were 37 small transformation industries employing 204 workers and 260 retail units employing 264 workers. The GDP in 2005 was approximately R$33 million, with 20 million reais from services, 3 million reais from industry, and 8 million reais from agriculture. There were 311 rural producers on 13,000 hectares of land. 37 farms had tractors (2006). Approximately 600 persons were employed in agriculture. The main crops are beans and corn. There were 12,000 head of cattle (2006).

There was one bank (2007). In the vehicle fleet there were 1,116 automobiles, 125 trucks, 143 pickup trucks, 107 buses, and 823 motorcycles (2007).

== Health and education ==
In the health sector there were 3 public health clinics and 1 hospital with 32 beds. (2005). Patients with more serious health conditions are transported to Divinópolis or Belo Horizonte. Educational needs of 1,500 students were met by 6 primary schools, 1 middle school, and 1 pre-primary school.

- Municipal Human Development Index: 0.773 (2000)
- State ranking: 155 out of 853 municipalities as of 2000
- National ranking: 1259 out of 5,138 municipalities as of 2000
- Literacy rate: 89%
- Life expectancy: 70 (average of males and females)

In 2000 the per capita monthly income of R$289.00 was above the state average of R$276.00 and below the national average of R$297.00. Poços de Caldas had the highest per capita monthly income in 2000 with R$435.00. The lowest was Setubinha with R$73.00.

The highest ranking municipality in Minas Gerais in 2000 was Poços de Caldas with 0.841, while the lowest was Setubinha with 0.568. Nationally the highest was São Caetano do Sul in São Paulo with 0.919, while the lowest was Setubinha. In more recent statistics (considering 5,507 municipalities) Manari in the state of Pernambuco has the lowest rating in the country—0,467—putting it in last place.

== See also ==
- List of municipalities in Minas Gerais
