= Tourtia =

Geologic formation in Belgium

- Stratigraphic range: Cenomanian
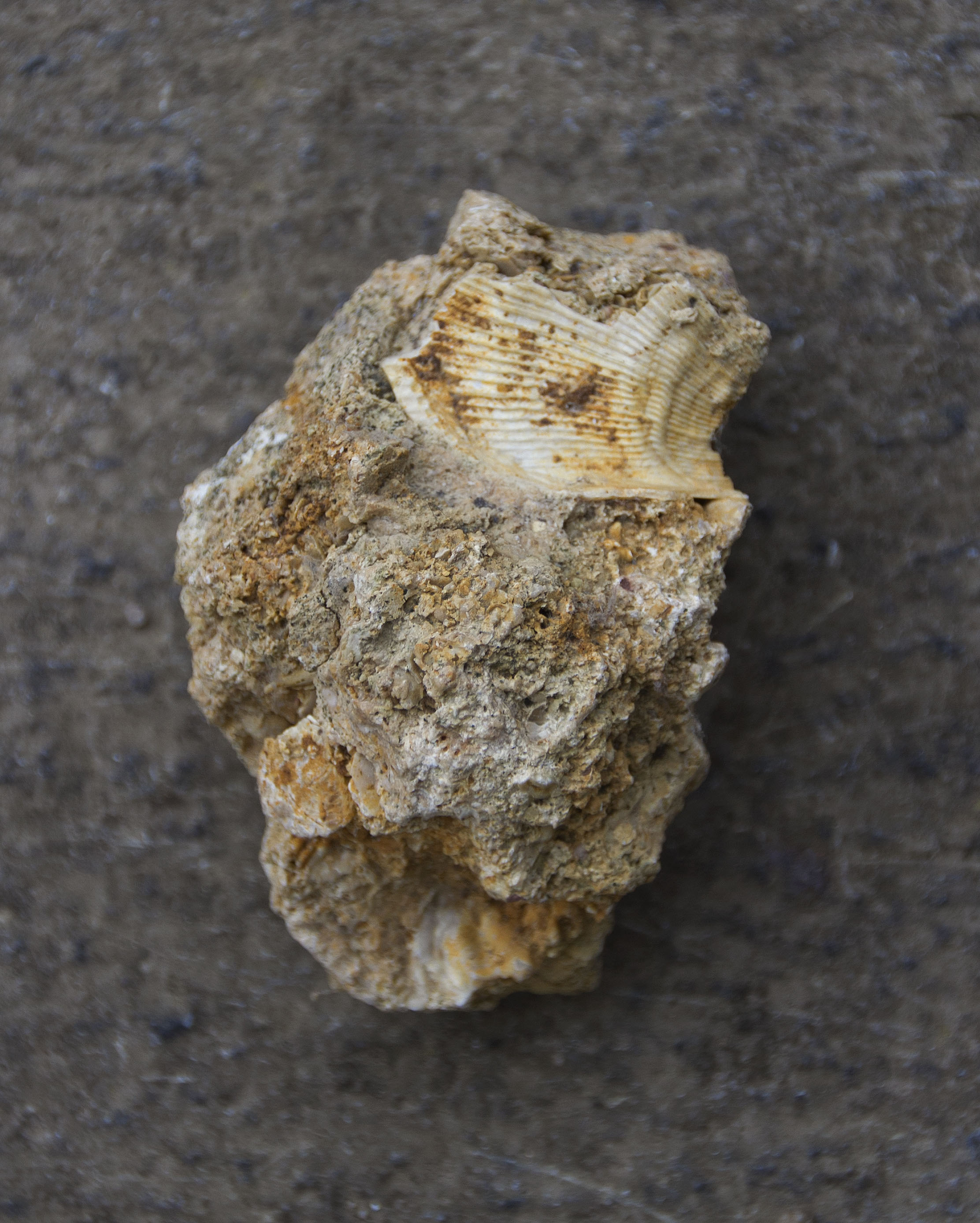
- Sarrasin de Bettrechies
- Type: Geologic formation

Lithology
- Primary: Clay-sand conglomerate

Location
- Coordinates: 50.6207°N 3.4061°E
- Region: Hainaut
- Country: Belgium
- Tourtia (Belgium)

Tourtia is a Cenomanian clay-sand conglomeratic deposit found in Wallonia.

Those deposits are generally composed of a matrix of grey or blackish clay more or less sandy, bearing various pebbles from the Paleozoic and Albian fossils undergoing taphonomic reworking.

The Tourtia from Tournai, also called sarrasin de Bellignies or sarrasin de Bettrechies, is a glauconitic marl bearing Paleozoic pebbles.
