= Bom Despacho =

Bom Despacho can refer to the following places:

- Bom Despacho, Minas Gerais
- A ferry-terminal on the island of Itaparica, from which car-ferries can be boarded for Salvador.
