= Dores do Indaiá =

Town and municipality in the state of Minas Gerais, Brazil

Coordinates: 19°27′46″S 45°36′07″W

- Municipality
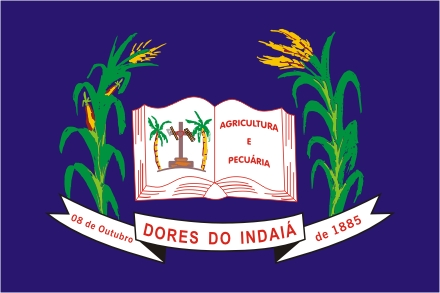
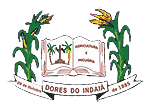
- Flag Coat of arms
- Interactive map of Dores do Indaiá
- Country: Brazil
- State: Minas Gerais
- Region: Southeast

Population (2022 Census)
  - Total: 12,630
  - Estimate (2025): 12,730
- Time zone: UTC−3 (BRT)

Location of Dores do Indaiá on a map of the state of Minas Gerais

Dores do Indaiá is a Brazilian municipality located in the center of the state of Minas Gerais. Its population as of 2025 was 12,730 people living in a total area of 1,111 km^{2}. The city belongs to the meso-region of Central Mineira and to the micro-region of Bom Despacho. It became a municipality in 1880.

== Geography ==
The city center of Dores do Indaiá is located at an elevation of 723 meters just off state highway MG-176, 8 km south of its junction with federal highway BR-262. Neighboring municipalities are: Quartel Geral (N), Martinho Campos (E), Bom Despacho (SE), Luz (S), Estrela do Indaiá and Serra da Saudade (W).

Distances

- Belo Horizonte: 255 km
- Bom Despacho: 65 km
- Serra da Saudade: 19 km
- Quartel Geral: 30 km

== Economic activities ==
Services and agriculture are the most important economic activities. In 2005 there were 91 small transformation industries employing 362 workers and 401 retail units employing 831 workers. The GDP in 2005 was approximately R$89 million, with 54 million reais from services, 9 million reais from industry, and 19 million reais from agriculture. There were 577 rural producers on 98,000 hectares of land. 169 farms had tractors (2006). Approximately 1,200 persons were occupied in agriculture. The main crops are rice, sugarcane, manioc, beans and corn. There were 66,000 head of cattle, of which 10,000 were milk cows (2006).

There were 6 banks: Banco do Brasil - Caixa Econômica Federal - Banco Itaú - Bradesco - Credindaiá - Coopcredi (2007). In the vehicle fleet there were 2,290 automobiles, 180 trucks, 352 pickup trucks, 18 buses, and 556 motorcycles (2007).

== Health and education ==
In the health sector there were 4 public health clinics and 1 hospital (A Santa Casa de Misericórdia Dr. Zacarias) with 42 beds. (2005). There are 4 private doctors. Patients with more serious health conditions are transported to Divinópolis or Belo Horizonte. Educational needs of 3,200 students were met by 7 primary schools, 2 middle schools, and 6 pre-primary schools.

- Municipal Human Development Index: 0.752 (2000)
- State ranking: 270 out of 853 municipalities as of 2000
- National ranking: 1836 out of 5,138 municipalities as of 2000
- Literacy rate: 86%
- Life expectancy: 70 (average of males and females)

In 2000 the per capita monthly income of R$239.00 was below the national average of R$297.00. Poços de Caldas had the highest per capita monthly income in 2000 with R$435.00. The lowest was Setubinha with R$73.00.

The highest ranking municipality in Minas Gerais in 2000 was Poços de Caldas with 0.841, while the lowest was Setubinha with 0.568. Nationally the highest was São Caetano do Sul in São Paulo with 0.919, while the lowest was Setubinha. In more recent statistics (considering 5,507 municipalities) Manari in the state of Pernambuco has the lowest rating in the country—0,467—putting it in last place.

== See also ==
- List of municipalities in Minas Gerais
