= Leandro Ferreira =

Town and municipality in the state of Minas Gerais, Brazil

Coordinates: 19°43′04″S 45°01′30″W

- Municipality
- Interactive map of Leandro Ferreira
- Country: Brazil
- State: Minas Gerais
- Region: Southeast

Population (2022 Census)
  - Total: 199
  - Estimate (2025): 3,272
- Time zone: UTC−3 (BRT)

Location of Leandro Ferreira on a map of the state of Minas Gerais

Leandro Ferreira is a Brazilian municipality located in the center of the state of Minas Gerais. Its population as of 2025 was 3,272 people living in a total area of 352 km^{2} (136 sq mi). The city belongs to the meso-region of Central Mineira and to the micro-region of Bom Despacho. It became a municipality in 1963.

== Geography ==
=== Location ===
The city center of Leandro Ferreira is located at an elevation of 700 m (2,300 ft) on state highway MG-235, in the Serra da Saudade mountains. Neighboring municipalities are: Martinho Campos (N), Pitangui and Conceição do Pará (E), Nova Serrana (S), and Bom Despacho (W).

Distances

- Belo Horizonte: 144 km (89 mi)
- Nova Serrana: 17 km (11 mi) south
- Divinópolis: 57 km (35 mi)

=== Geographical Facts ===
- Average annual temperature: 22.1 C
- Average annual maximum temperature: 29.1 C
- Average annual minimum temperature: 16.7 C
- Average annual rainfall: 1415.7 mm
- Topography: flat 20%, hilly 30%, mountainous 50%
- Main rivers: Rio Pará, Rio Lambari, and Ribeirão das Areias.

== Economic activities ==
Services, small industries, and agriculture are the most important economic activities. In 2005 there were 10 extractive industries employing 35 workers, 7 transformation industries employing 118 workers, and 34 retail units employing 55 workers. The GDP in 2005 was approximately R$19 million, with 9 million reais from services, 1 million reais from industry, and 7 million reais from agriculture. There were 217 rural producers on 18,000 hectares of land. 36 farms had tractors (2006). Approximately 600 people were occupied in agriculture. The main crops are rice, beans, and corn. There were 19,000 head of cattle, of which 6,000 were milk cows (2006).

There was one bank (2007). In the vehicle fleet there were 325 automobiles, 30 trucks, 48 pickup trucks, 5 buses, and 249 motorcycles (2007).

== Health and education ==
In the health sector there were 3 public health clinics. (2005). Patients with more serious health conditions are transported to Belo Horizonte. Educational needs of 750 students were met by 3 primary schools, 1 middle school, and 1 pre-primary school.

- Municipal Human Development Index: 0.737 (2000)
- State ranking: 370 out of 853 municipalities as of 2000
- National ranking: 2239 out of 5,138 municipalities as of 2000
- Literacy rate: 85%
- Life expectancy: 70 (average of males and females)

In 2000 the per capita monthly income of R$197.00 was below the state average of R$276.00 and below the national average of R$297.00. Poços de Caldas had the highest per capita monthly income in 2000 with R$435.00. The lowest was Setubinha with R$73.00.

The highest ranking municipality in Minas Gerais in 2000 was Poços de Caldas with 0.841, while the lowest was Setubinha with 0.568. Nationally the highest was São Caetano do Sul in São Paulo with 0.919, while the lowest was Setubinha. In more recent statistics (considering 5,507 municipalities) Manari in the state of Pernambuco has the lowest rating in the country - 0.467 - putting it in last place.

== See also ==
- List of municipalities in Minas Gerais
