= Estrela do Indaiá =

Municipality of Brazil

Coordinates: 19°31′19″S 45°47′16″W

- Municipality
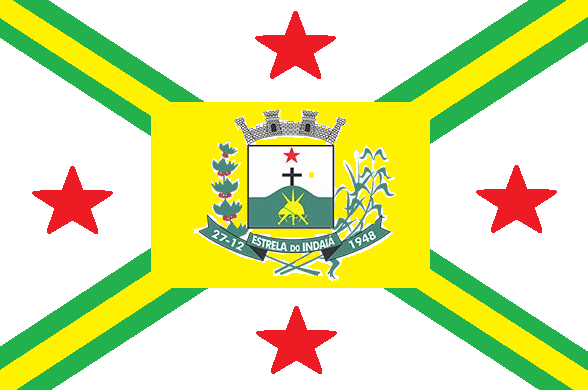
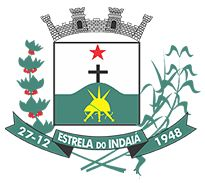
- Flag Coat of arms
- Interactive map of Estrela do Indaiá
- Country: Brazil
- State: Minas Gerais
- Region: Southeast

Population (2022 Census)
  - Total: 2,772
  - Estimate (2025): 2,772
- Time zone: UTC−3 (BRT)

Location of Estrela do Indaiá on a map of the state of Minas Gerais

Estrela do Indaiá is a Brazilian municipality located in the center of the state of Minas Gerais. Its population as of 2025 was 2,711 people living in a total area of 635 km^{2} (245 sq mi). The city belongs to the meso-region of Central Mineira and to the micro-region of Bom Despacho. It became a municipality in 1948.

== Geography ==
The city center of Estrela do Indaiá is located at an elevation of 713 meters on state highway MG-235, in the Serra da Saudade mountains. Neighboring municipalities are: Serra da Saudade (N), Dores do Indaiá (E), Luz (S), Santa Rosa da Serra (W).

Distances

- Belo Horizonte: 248 km on MG-235, MG-176, and BR-262
- Serra da Saudade: 13 km north on MG-235
- Luz: 35 km south on MG-235 then MG-176

== Economic activities ==
Services, small industries, and agriculture are the most important economic activities. In 2005 there were 14 small transformation industries employing 25 workers and 61 retail units employing 123 workers. Public administration was the biggest employer with 159 workers. The GDP in 2005 was approximately R$27 million, with 12 million reais from services, 2 million reais from industry, and 11 million reais from agriculture. There were 389 rural producers on 61,000 hectares of land. 72 farms had tractors (2006). Approximately 800 persons were occupied in agriculture. The main crops are rice, sugarcane, manioc, beans soybeans, and corn. There were 44,000 head of cattle, of which 6,000 were milk cows (2006).

There was one bank (2007). In the vehicle fleet there were 441 automobiles, 32 trucks, 63 pickup trucks, 2 buses, and 93 motorcycles (2007).

== Health and education ==
In the health sector there were 3 public health clinics and 1 hospital with 24 beds. (2005). Patients with more serious health conditions are transported to Belo Horizonte. Educational needs of 750 students were met by 3 primary schools, 1 middle school, and 2 pre-primary schools.

- Municipal Human Development Index: 0.738 (2000)
- State ranking: 336 out of 853 municipalities as of 2000
- National ranking: 2207 out of 5,138 municipalities as of 2000
- Literacy rate: 84%
- Life expectancy: 70 (average of males and females)

In 2000 the per capita monthly income of R$214.00 was below the state average of R$276.00 and below the national average of R$297.00. Poços de Caldas had the highest per capita monthly income in 2000 with R$435.00. The lowest was Setubinha with R$73.00.

The highest ranking municipality in Minas Gerais in 2000 was Poços de Caldas with 0.841, while the lowest was Setubinha with 0.568. Nationally the highest was São Caetano do Sul in São Paulo with 0.919, while the lowest was Setubinha. In more recent statistics (considering 5,507 municipalities) Manari in the state of Pernambuco has the lowest rating in the country—0,467—putting it in last place.

== See also ==
- List of municipalities in Minas Gerais
