= Bom Despacho, Minas Gerais =

Bom Despacho
- Municipality
- Município de Bom Despacho
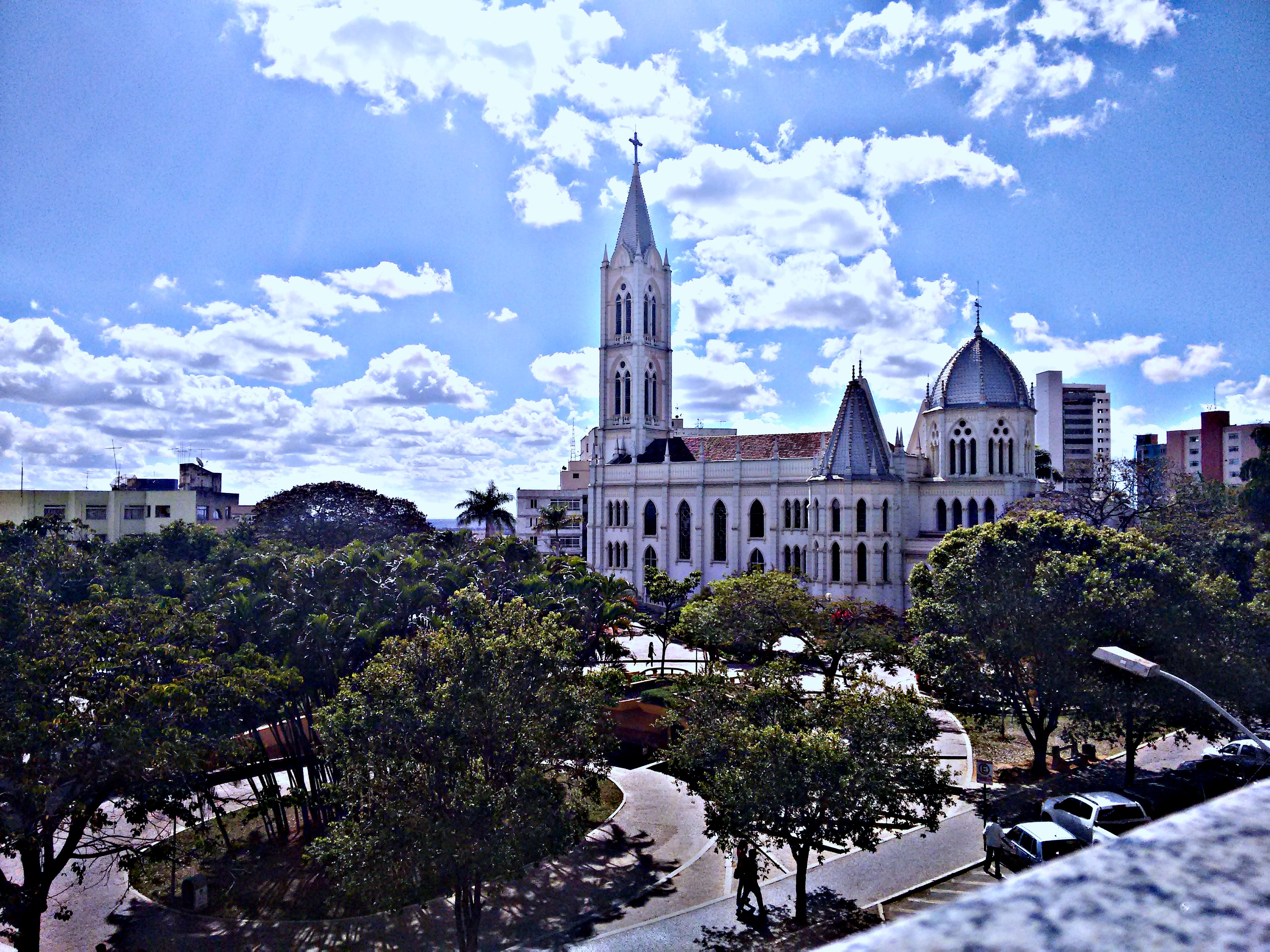
- Square in Downtown

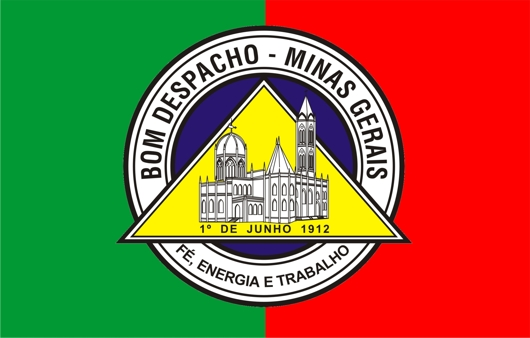
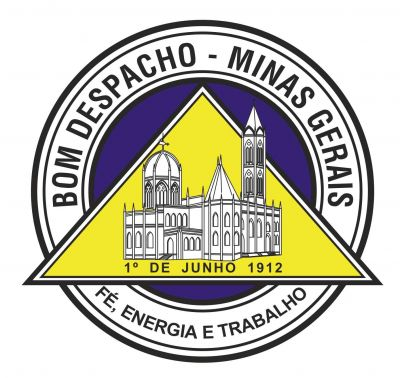
- Flag Coat of arms
- Nickname: "Cidade Sorriso" "A Cidade da Senhora do Sol" "Capital Mineira do Leite" "Metrópole do Interior" "Terra da Biquinha e do Biscoito de Mariquinha"
- Motto: Fé, energia, e trabalho
- Location of Bom Despacho in the state of Minas Gerais

- Location of Bom Despacho in Brazil
- Coordinates: 19°44′09″S 45°15′07″W
- Country: Brazil
- Region: Southeast
- State: Minas Gerais

Government
  - Prefeito: Bertolino da Costa Neto (AVANTE)

Area
  - Municipality: 1,213.202 km^{2} (468.420 sq mi)
- Elevation: 768 m (2,520 ft)

Population (2022 Census)
  - Municipality: 51,737
  - Estimate (2025): 54,377
  - Density: 417/km^{2} (1,080/sq mi)
  - Metro: 51,028
- Time zone: UTC−3 (BRT)

Bom Despacho is a Brazilian municipality located in the west of the state of Minas Gerais. The population is 54,377 (2025 est.) in an area of 1,213.55 km^{2} (468.55 sq mi). The city belongs to the meso-region of Central Mineira and to the micro-region of Bom Despacho. It became a municipality in 1912.

== Geography ==
The city center of Bom Despahco is located at an elevation of 768 meters just off the major federal highway BR-262, which links Belo Horizonte to Uberaba. State highway MG-164 leads to Martinho Campos in the north (63 km.). The São Francisco River forms the western municipal boundary. Neighboring municipalities are: Martinho Campos (N), Leandro Ferreira (E), Araújos, Moema, and Luz (S), and Dores do Indaiá (W).

Distances to other cities

- Belo Horizonte/MG - 141 km
- Brasília/DF - 730 km
- Rio de Janeiro/RJ - 576 km
- São Paulo/SP - 580 km
- Martinho Campos/MG - 50 km
- Araújos/MG - 19 km
- Luz/MG - 49 km
- Moema/MG - 23 km

=== Micro-region of Bom Despacho ===
Bom Despacho is a statistical micro-region which includes 12 municipalities: Araújos, Bom Despacho, Dores do Indaiá, Estrela do Indaiá, Japaraíba, Lagoa da Prata, Leandro Ferreira, Luz, Martinho Campos, Moema, Quartel Geral, and Serra da Saudade. In 2000 the area of this region was 7,515.50 km^{2} and the population was 146,156 inhabitants.

=== Climate ===
Climate data for Bom Despacho (1991–2020)
Month	Jan	Feb	Mar	Apr	May	Jun	Jul	Aug	Sep	Oct	Nov	Dec	Year
Mean daily maximum °C (°F)	31.0 (87.8)	31.4 (88.5)	30.7 (87.3)	30.2 (86.4)	28.1 (82.6)	27.5 (81.5)	28.0 (82.4)	29.8 (85.6)	31.2 (88.2)	31.6 (88.9)	30.2 (86.4)	30.5 (86.9)	30.0 (86.0)
Daily mean °C (°F)	24.0 (75.2)	23.9 (75.0)	23.4 (74.1)	22.0 (71.6)	19.1 (66.4)	17.6 (63.7)	17.3 (63.1)	18.8 (65.8)	21.2 (70.2)	23.0 (73.4)	23.1 (73.6)	23.7 (74.7)	21.4 (70.5)
Mean daily minimum °C (°F)	19.1 (66.4)	18.6 (65.5)	18.3 (64.9)	16.1 (61.0)	12.5 (54.5)	10.3 (50.5)	9.4 (48.9)	10.4 (50.7)	13.5 (56.3)	16.3 (61.3)	18.0 (64.4)	18.9 (66.0)	15.1 (59.2)
Average precipitation mm (inches)	251.8 (9.91)	162.8 (6.41)	151.9 (5.98)	51.4 (2.02)	38.0 (1.50)	15.5 (0.61)	5.3 (0.21)	9.3 (0.37)	48.8 (1.92)	104.3 (4.11)	214.0 (8.43)	287.6 (11.32)	1,340.7 (52.78)
Average precipitation days (≥ 1.0 mm)	14	11	11	5	3	2	1	1	5	8	14	16	91
Average relative humidity (%)	76.3	75.2	77.5	75.3	74.6	72.7	68.0	62.0	62.4	66.8	74.9	78.1	72.0
Average dew point °C (°F)	20.3 (68.5)	20.1 (68.2)	20.1 (68.2)	18.7 (65.7)	15.9 (60.6)	14.3 (57.7)	13.1 (55.6)	13.0 (55.4)	15.0 (59.0)	17.6 (63.7)	19.0 (66.2)	19.3 (66.7)	17.3 (63.1)
Source: Instituto Nacional de Meteorologia

== Economic activities ==
Services, light industry, and agriculture are the most important economic activities. The GDP in 2005 was approximately R$393 million (US$161.44 million), R$41 million from taxes, 223 million reais from services, 77 million reais from industry, and 51 million reais from agriculture. There were 560 rural producers on 63,000 hectares of land (2006). 179 farms had tractors (2006). Approximately 2,000 persons were involved in agriculture. The main crops are watermelon, soybeans, rice, sugarcane, and corn. There were 78,000 head of cattle (2006). Poultry raising was also substantial with over one million head in 2006.

There were 5 banks (2007). The motor vehicle fleet had 8,354 automobiles, 1,049 pickup trucks, and 2,520 motorcycles. The ratio of inhabitant per motor vehicle was 2/1.

Working population by sector

- Transformation industries (218 units): 1,929 workers
- Commerce (937 units): 3,430 workers
- Lodging and restaurants (32 units): 302 workers
- Transport, storage, communications (98 units): 450 workers
- Public administration: 1,000 workers
- Health and social services: 332 workers

== Health and education ==
In the health sector there were 12 public health clinics (2005) and 2 private hospitals with 96 beds. Patients with more serious health conditions are transported to Belo Horizonte. Educational needs of 9,700 students were met by 20 primary schools, 6 middle schools, and 18 pre-primary schools.

- Municipal Human Development Index: 0.799 (2000)
- State ranking: 42 out of 853 municipalities as of 2000
- National ranking: 584 out of 5,138 municipalities as of 2000
- Literacy rate: 90%
- Life expectancy: 72 (average of males and females)

In 2000 the per capita monthly income of R$307 (US$167.81) was above the state and national average of R$276 (US$150.87) and R$297 (US$162.35) respectively. Poços de Caldas had the highest per capita monthly income in 2000 with R$435 (US$237.78). The lowest was Setubinha with R$73 (US$39.9).

The highest ranking municipality in Minas Gerais in 2000 was Poços de Caldas with 0.841, while the lowest was Setubinha with 0.568. Nationally the highest was São Caetano do Sul in São Paulo with 0.919, while the lowest was Setubinha. In more recent statistics (considering 5,507 municipalities) Manari in the state of Pernambuco has the lowest rating in the country—0,467—putting it in last place.

== History of immigration ==
The city of Bom Despacho has seen a significant influx of German settlers in the 1920s, however, their tradition has vanished and their history is almost forgotten.

Due to the efforts of the Brazilian politician Faustino Assunção the city of Bom Despacho was chosen to participate in the settlement program initiated by the Ministry of Agriculture during the Bernardes government. (President of the state of Minas Gerais from 1918 to 1922 and president of Brazil 1922–1926) The aim of this program was to attract European settlers to cultivate the soil surrounding Bom Despacho. For this purpose, the city provided two large areas of farmland in the direct vicinity of Bom Despacho which were named after Brazilian politicians, Colônia David Campista and Colônia Álvaro da Silveira.

At the beginning of the 1920s settlers from various European countries arrived in several waves. Most of them were from Germany as the country was in political and economical turmoil after the defeat in World War 1. The new settlers received agricultural plots, houses, tools, and seeds on a credit basis which they had to pay off from the proceeds of their crop. The German embassy even established and operated a German school on Colonia David Campista. The school served the families of both settlements, a known total of at least 54 families.

However, the German immigrants on these two settlements dispersed within the next two decades. Unfrugal soil and tropical diseases let many settlers to abandon their lot quickly and seek work in the big cities, such as Belo Horzionte. Some German families even returned to Germany.

When Brazil joined World War 2 on the side of the Allies in 1942, the German school was closed and it was forbidden to even speak German. As a result, many more settlers left their plots.

Today, there are only very few descendants of the original German settlers still living on Colonia David Campista and on Colonia Alvaro Da Silveira. However, some of them still speak German.

The cemetery belonging to the two farmlands is called German cemetery by the locals. Its official inscription on the gate reads Imigrantes da Colonia.

== See also ==
- List of municipalities in Minas Gerais
- Colônia Álvaro da Silveira (in Portuguese)
- Colônia David Campista (in Portuguese)
