= Central Mineira (mesoregion) =

- Mesoregion
- Location of Central Mineira mesoregion
- Coordinates: 18°45′21″S 44°25′51″W
- Country: Brazil
- Region: Southeast
- State: Minas Gerais

Area
  - Total: 31,751.901 km^{2} (12,259.478 sq mi)

Population (2010/IBGE)
  - Total: 466,521
  - Density: 12.8/km^{2} (33/sq mi)
- Time zone: UTC-3 (BRT)
  - Summer (DST): UTC-2 (BRST)

Central Mineira (transl. Central Minas) is one of the twelve mesoregions of the Brazilian state of Minas Gerais. It is composed of 30 municipalities, distributed across 3 microregions.
