= Glauconite =

Phyllosilicate mineral in the dioctahedral mica group

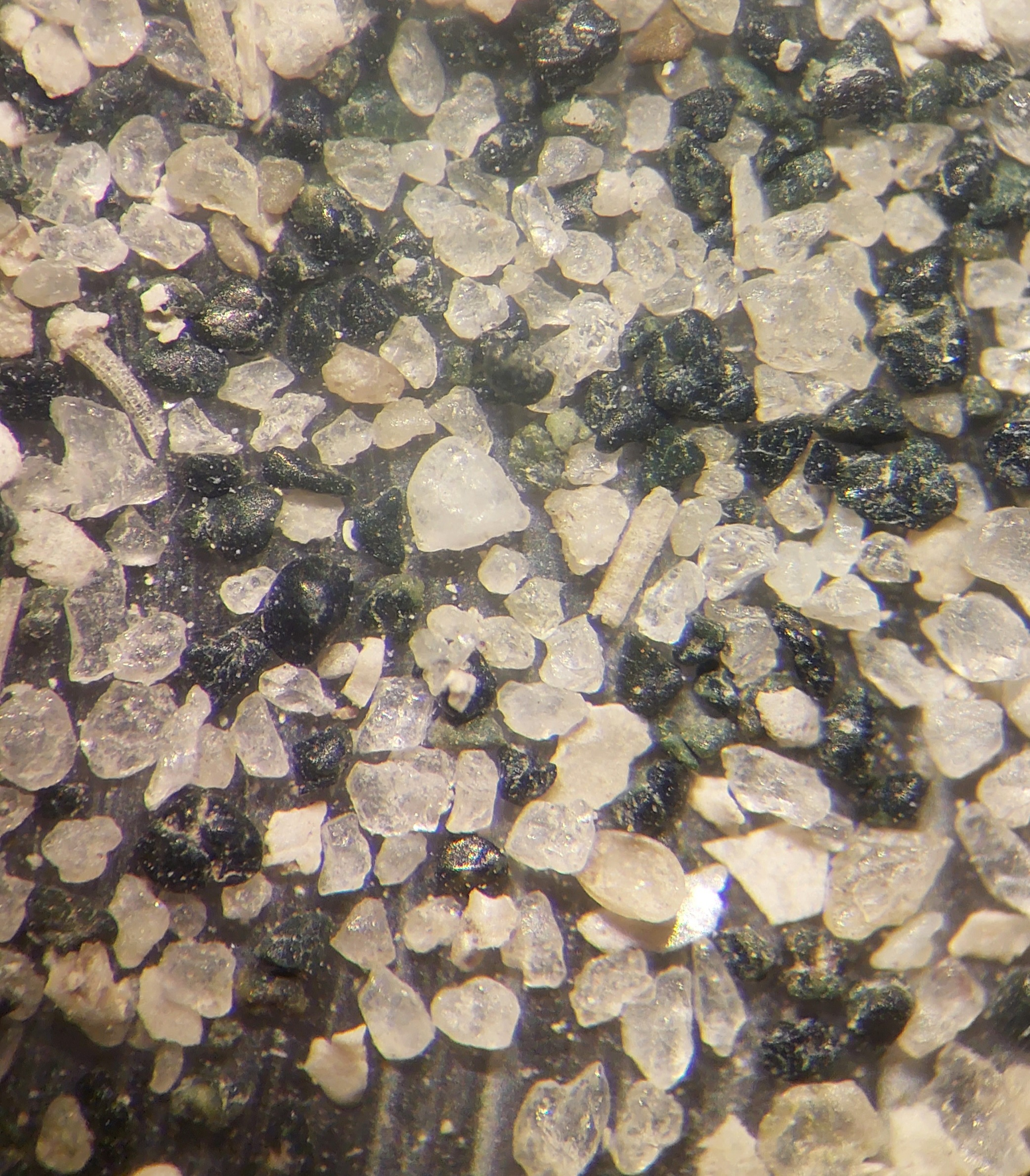
- Glauconite pellets and small fossils among quartz grains in greensand from the Dutch Pliocene

General
- Category: Phyllosilicate minerals
- Group: Mica group, dioctahedral mica group
- Formula: (K,Na)(Fe,Al,Mg)_{2}(Si,Al)_{4}O_{10}(OH)_{2}
- IMA symbol: Glt
- Crystal system: Monoclinic
- Crystal class: Prismatic (2/m) (same H-M symbol)
- Space group: C2/m
- Unit cell: a = 5.234 Å, b = 9.066 Å, c = 10.16 Å; β = 100.5°; Z = 2

Identification
- Color: Blue green, green, yellow green
- Crystal habit: Elastic platy/micaceous, or as rounded pellets/aggregates
- Cleavage: Perfect [001]
- Mohs scale hardness: 2
- Luster: Dull, earthy
- Streak: Light green
- Diaphaneity: Translucent to nearly opaque
- Specific gravity: 2.4–2.95
- Optical properties: Biaxial (-); moderate relief
- Refractive index: n_{α} = 1.590 – 1.612 n_{β} = 1.609 – 1.643 n_{γ} = 1.610 – 1.644
- Birefringence: δ = 0.020 – 0.032
- Pleochroism: X = yellow-green, green; Y = Z = deeper yellow, bluish green
- Other characteristics: loosely bound aggregates, crumbles radioactivity: barely detectable

Glauconite is an iron potassium phyllosilicate (mica group) mineral of characteristic green color which is very friable and has very low weathering resistance.

It crystallizes with a monoclinic geometry. Its name is derived from the Greek glaucos (γλαυκός) meaning 'bluish green', referring to the common blue-green color of the mineral; its sheen (mica glimmer) and blue-green color. Its color ranges from olive green, black green to bluish green, and yellowish on exposed surfaces due to oxidation. In the Mohs scale it has a hardness of 2, roughly the same as gypsum. The relative specific gravity range is 2.4–2.95. It is normally found as dark green rounded concretions with the dimensions of a sand grain. It can be confused with chlorite (also of green color) or with a clay mineral. Glauconite has the chemical formula (K,Na)(Fe,Al,Mg)_{2}(Si,Al)_{4}O_{10}(OH)_{2}.

Glauconite particles are one of the main components of greensand, glauconitic siltstone and glauconitic sandstone. Glauconite has been called a marl in an old and broad sense of that word. Thus references to "greensand marl" sometimes refer specifically to glauconite. The Glauconitic Marl formation is named after it, and there is a glauconitic sandstone formation in the Mannville Group of Western Canada.

== Occurrence ==
At the broadest level, glauconite is an authigenic mineral and forms commonly in marine settings. It is commonly associated with low-oxygen conditions.

Normally, glauconite is considered a diagnostic mineral indicative of continental shelf marine depositional environments with slow rates of accumulation and gradational boundaries. For instance, it appears in Jurassic/lower Cretaceous deposits of greensand, so-called after the coloration caused by glauconite, its presence gradually lessening further landward. It can also be found in sand or clay formations, or in impure limestones and in chalk. It develops as a consequence of diagenetic alteration of sedimentary deposits at the surface, bio-chemical reduction and subsequent mineralogical changes affecting iron-bearing micas such as biotite, and is also influenced by the decaying process of organic matter degraded by bacteria in marine animal shells. In these cases, the organic matter creates the reducing environment needed to form glauconite within otherwise oxygenated sediment. Glauconite deposits are commonly found in nearshore sands, open oceans and shallow seas, such as the Mediterranean Sea. Glauconite remains absent in fresh-water lakes, but is noted in shelf sediments of the western Black Sea. The wide distribution of these sandy deposits was first made known by naturalists on board the fifth HMS Challenger, in the expedition of 1872–1876.

== Uses ==
Glauconite has long been used in Europe as a green pigment for artistic oil paint under the name green earth. One example is its use in Russian "icon paintings", another widespread use was for underpainting of human flesh in medieval painting. It is also found as mineral pigment in wall paintings from the ancient Roman Gaul.

=== Fertilizers ===
Glauconite, a major component of greensand, is a common source of potassium (K^{+}) in plant fertilizers and is also used to adjust soil pH. It is used for soil conditioning in both organic and non-organic farming, whether as an unprocessed material (mixed in adequate proportions) or as a feedstock in the synthesis of commercial fertilizer powders. In Brazil, greensand refers to a fertilizer produced from a glauconitic siltstone unit belonging to the Serra da Saudade Formation, Bambuí Group, of Neoproterozoic/Ediacaran age. The outcrops occur in the Serra da Saudade ridge, in the Alto Paranaíba region, Minas Gerais state. It is a silty-clayed sedimentary rock, laminated, bluish-green, composed of glauconite (40-80%), potassium feldspar (10-15%), quartz (10-60%), muscovite (5%) and minor quantities of biotite (2%), goethite (<1%), titanium and manganese oxides (<1%), barium phosphate and rare-earth element phosphates (<1%).

Enriched levels of potash have K_{2}O grades between 8 and 12%, thickness up to 50 metres (160 ft) and are associated to the glauconitic levels, dark-green in color. Glauconite is authigenic and highly mature. The high concentration of this mineral is related to a depositional environment with a low sedimentation rate. The glauconitic siltstone has resulted from a high-level flooding event in the Bambuí Basin. The sedimentary provenance is from supracrustal felsic elements in a continental margin environment with acid magmatic arc (foreland basin).

== Hazards ==
In the wind farm industry off the coasts of Massachusetts, New York and New Jersey, glauconite-rich sands of Cretaceous to Paleogene age found in the seabed have become a hazard to the installation of monopiles used for turbine foundation. When these sands are manipulated, during the driving of monopiles, they start to crush, changing their geotechnical behaviour from sand-like to clay-like, with the risk of pile refusal, making it impossible to reach the target depth of the piles. The pile driving difficulties stem from the high frictional resistance of the native glauconite sand at the pile tip, combined with the high cohesive resistance of the altered, now clay-like material along the pile shaft.
