= Serra da Saudade =

Municipality of Minas Gerais, Brazil

Coordinates: 19°26′16″S 45°47′45″W

- Municipality

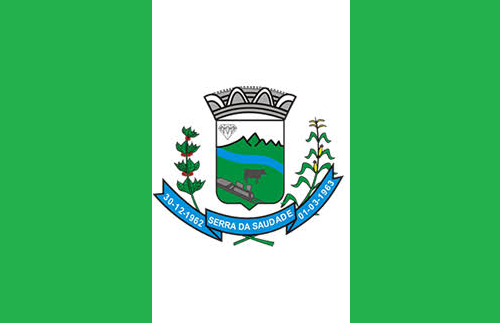
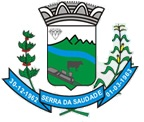
- Flag Coat of arms
- Interactive map of Serra da Saudade
- Country: Brazil
- State: Minas Gerais
- Region: Southeast

Population (2022 Census)
  - Total: 833
  - Estimate (2025): 856
  - Density: 1,141/km^{2} (2,960/sq mi)
- Time zone: UTC−3 (BRT)

Serra da Saudade is a Brazilian municipality located in the center of the state of Minas Gerais.

== Demography ==
Its population as of 2022 was 833 people living in a total area of 335.66 km^{2} (129.60 sq mi), making it the least populated municipality of Brazil. The population density is 2.48/km2. The village belongs to the meso-region of Central Mineira and to the micro-region of Bom Despacho. It became a municipality in 1962.

== Geography ==
The village center of Serra da Saudade is located at an elevation of 738 meters in a mountainous area of the Serra da Saudade. Neighboring municipalities are: Quartel Geral (N), Dores do Indaiá (E), Estrela do Indaiá (S), and São Gotardo (W).

Distances

- Belo Horizonte: 273 km
- Luz: 54 km south on MG-235, then MG-176
- Dores do Indaiá: 19 km southeast on dirt road (2002)
- Estrela do Indaiá: 17 km south on MG-235

== Economic activities ==
Services and agriculture are the most important economic activities. The GDP in 2005 was approximately R$7 million, with 4 million coming from services. There were 113 rural producers on 19,000 hectares of land. 25 farms had tractors (2006). Approximately 250 persons were employed in agriculture. The main crops are coffee, beans and corn. There were 15,000 head of cattle (2006) of which 1,000 were dairy cattle.

There were no banks (2007). In the vehicle fleet there were 124 automobiles, 4 trucks, 21 pickup trucks, 4 micro-buses, and 11 motorcycles. (2007).

== Health and education ==
In the health sector there was 1 public health clinic. (2005). Patients with more serious health conditions are transported to Divinópolis or Belo Horizonte. Educational needs of 170 students were met by 1 primary school and 1 pre-primary school. There was no middle school.

- Municipal Human Development Index: 0.742 (2000)
- State ranking: 348 out of 853 municipalities as of 2000
- National ranking: 2114 out of 5,138 municipalities as of 2000
- Literacy rate: 81%
- Life expectancy: 71 (average of males and females)

In 2000 the per capita monthly income of R$217.00 was below the state average of R$276.00 and below the national average of R$297.00. Poços de Caldas had the highest per capita monthly income in 2000 with R$435.00. The lowest was Setubinha with R$73.00.

The highest ranking municipality in Minas Gerais in 2000 was Poços de Caldas with 0.841, while the lowest was Setubinha with 0.568. Nationally the highest was São Caetano do Sul in São Paulo with 0.919, while the lowest was Setubinha. In more recent statistics (considering 5,507 municipalities) Manari in the state of Pernambuco has the lowest rating in the country—0,467—putting it in last place.

== See also ==
- List of municipalities in Minas Gerais
