= Pitangui =

- Municipality
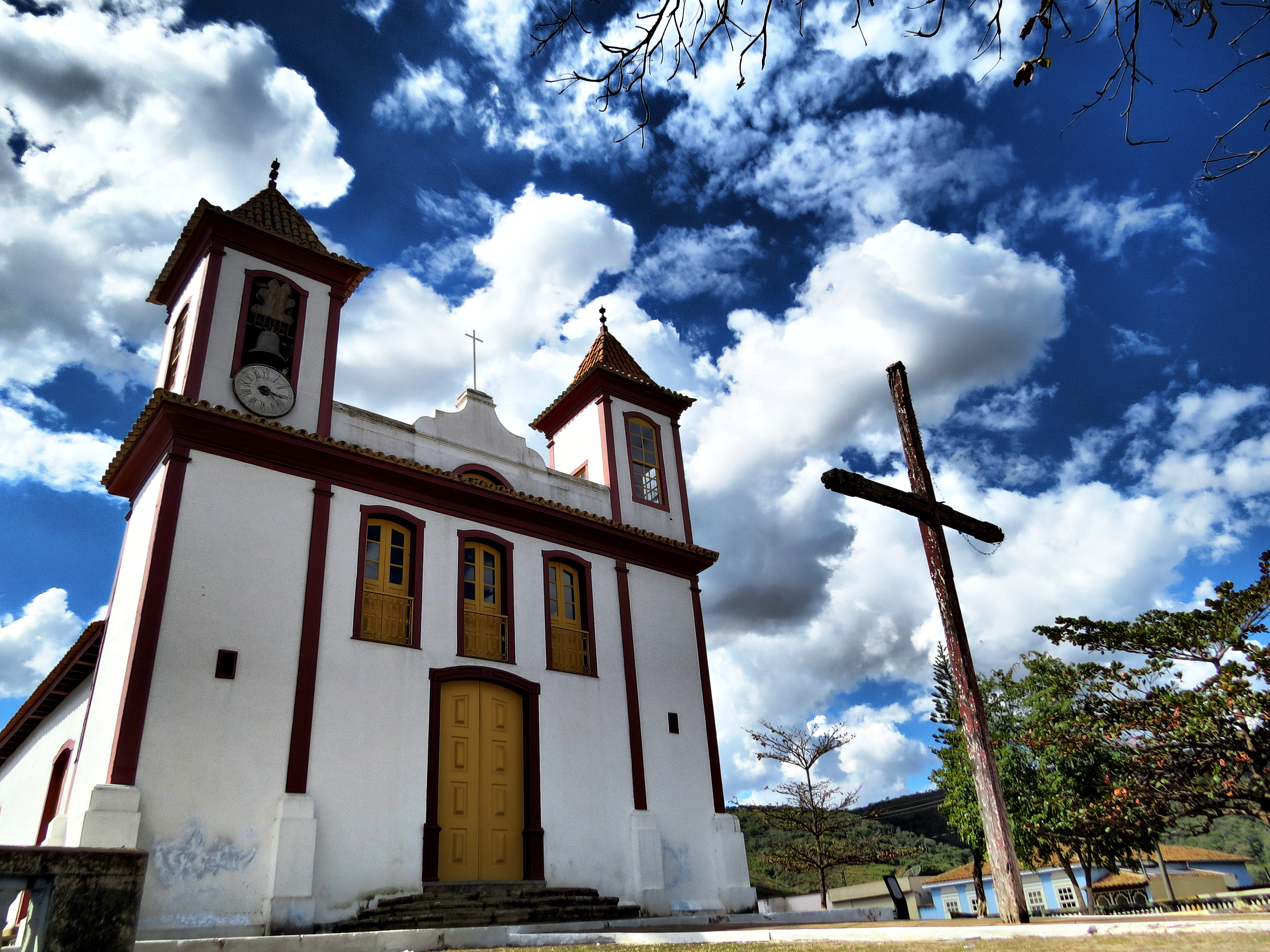

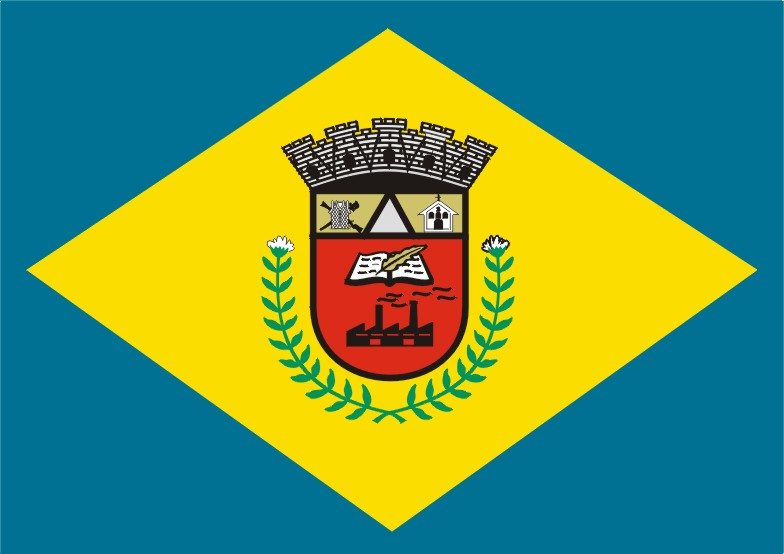
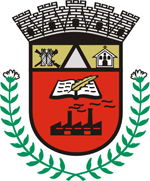
- Flag Coat of arms

- Location in Brazil
- Coordinates: 19°40′38″S 44°53′24″W
- Country: Brazil
- Region: Southeast
- State: Minas Gerais
- Mesoregion: Metropolitana de Belo Horizonte

Population (2022 Census)
  - Total: 26,685
  - Estimate (2025): 27,834
- Time zone: UTC−3 (BRT)

Pitangui is a municipality in the state of Minas Gerais in the Southeast region of Brazil.

== See also ==
- List of municipalities in Minas Gerais
