= Lagoa da Prata =

- Municipality
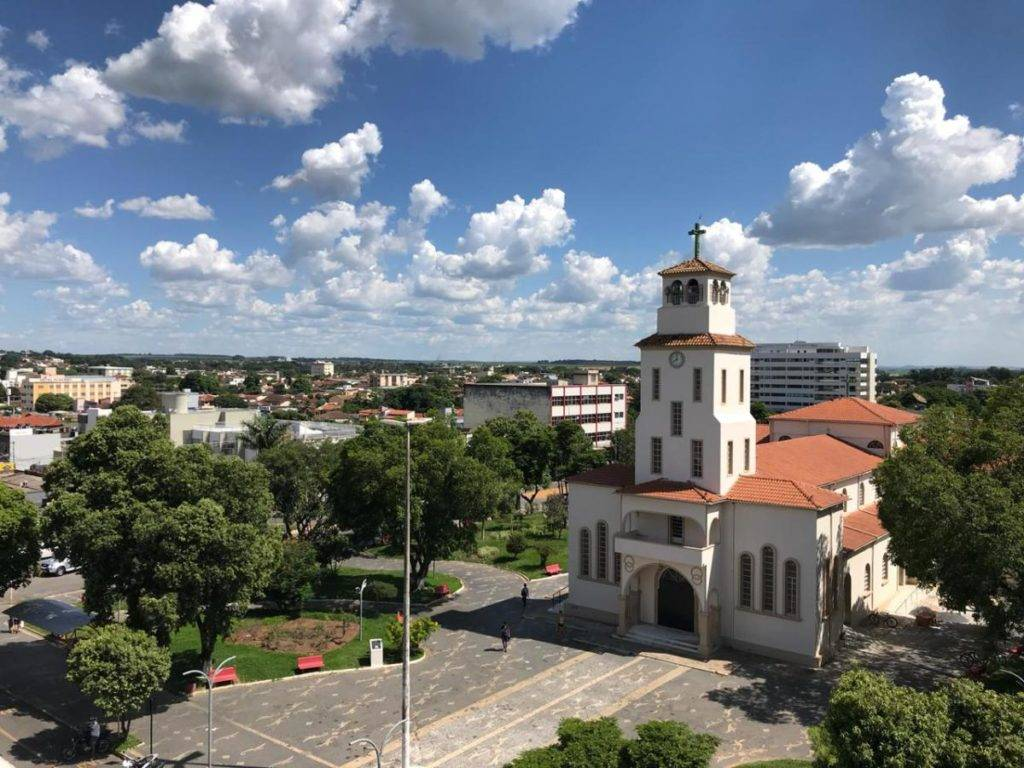

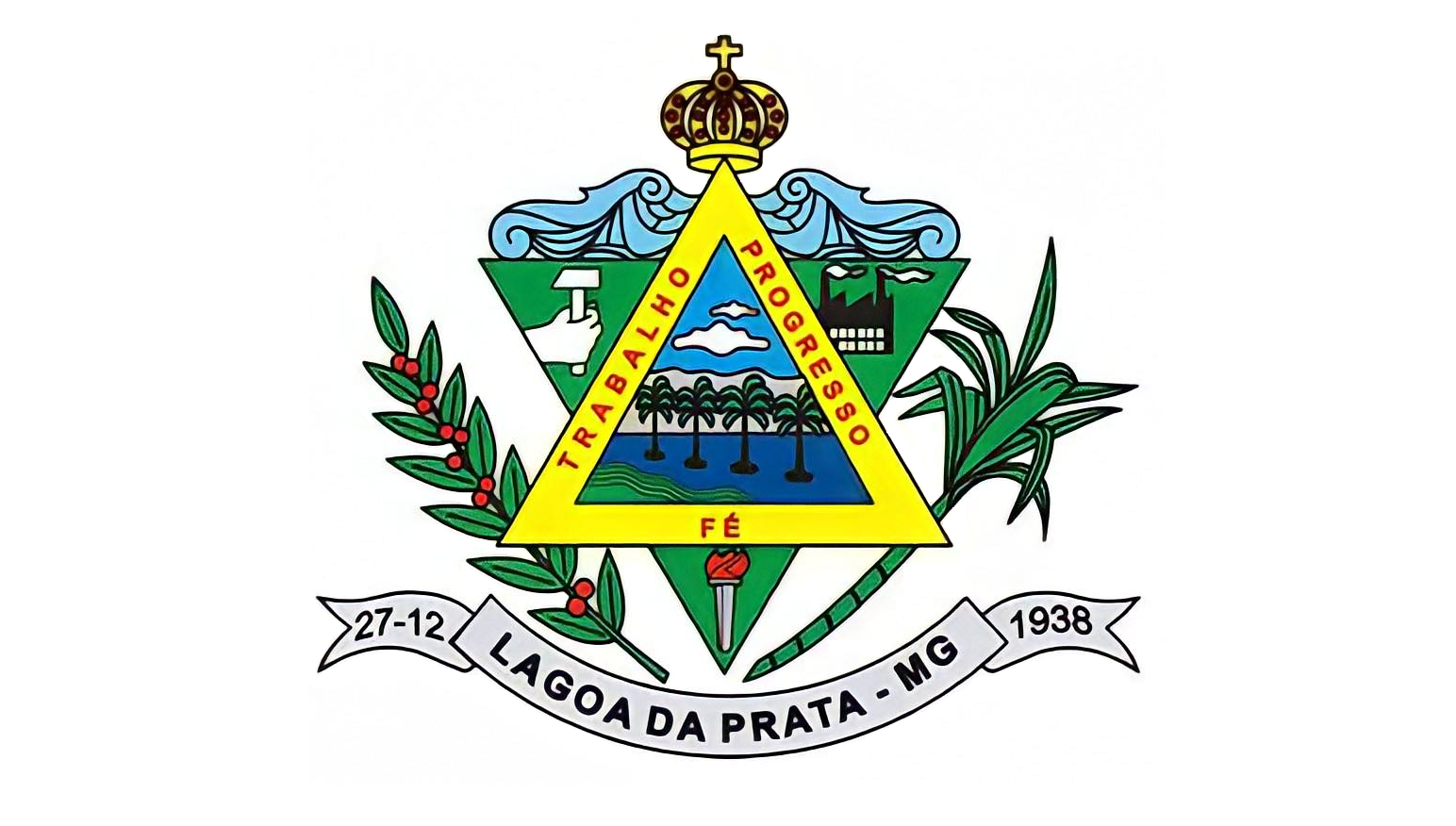
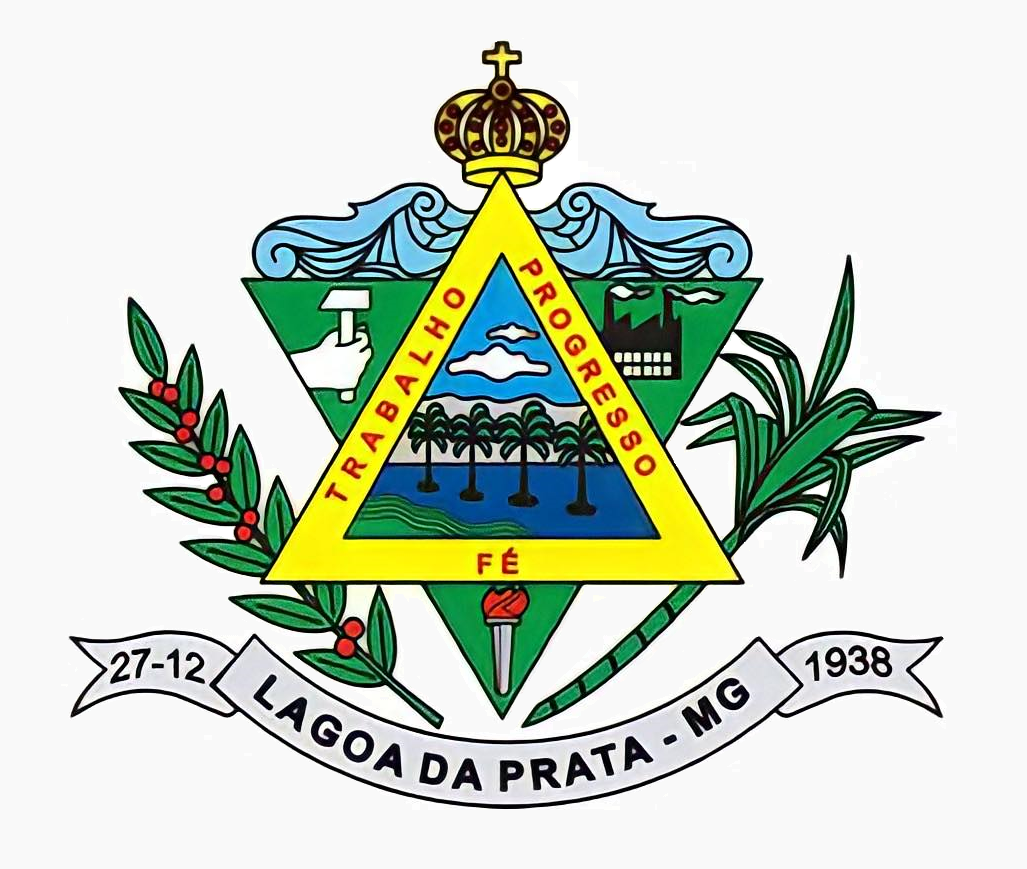
- Flag Coat of arms
- Motto(s): Work, progress, faith ("Trabalho, progresso, fé" in portuguese)

- Location within Brazil
- Coordinates: 20°01′22″S 45°32′38″W
- Country: Brazil
- Region: Southeast
- State: Minas Gerais
- Municipal incorporation: December 27, 1938

Government
  - Mayor: Di Gianne de Oliveira Nunes (Cidadania)

Area
  - Total: 439.984 km^{2} (169.879 sq mi)

Population (2022 Census)
  - Total: 51,412
  - Estimate (2025): 53,927
  - Density: 118.5/km^{2} (307/sq mi)
- Time zone: UTC−3 (BRT)

Lagoa da Prata is a Brazilian municipality in the state of Minas Gerais. In 2025, its population was estimated to be 53,927. The city belongs to the mesoregion of Central Mineira and to the microregion of Bom Despacho.

== History ==
In the 18th century, when Tiradentes was dismembered, the municipality of Itapecerica was created, consisting of 34 districts (or divisions) called ordinanças do Reino. Among them, there was a part called Pântano (where the municipality of Lagoa da Prata is located today), the 12th located. Another was Santo Antônio do Monte.

The occupation of the place where the city is today began with a dam, built by a Portuguese named Novato, who wanted mills and monjolos. With the expansion of its embankment and the affluence of the adjacent swamp, the small dam was transformed into a lagoon. Around 1850, Lieutenant Francisco Bernardes acquired a large extension of land on the banks of the São Francisco River. Bernardes acquired a large tract of land on the banks of the São Francisco River and established himself commercially there, later dedicating himself to agriculture. When he died, the farm was acquired by his nephew Colonel Carlos José Bernardes Sobrinho, who transferred it to the vicinity of the aforementioned lake, dedicating himself to the commercialization of coffee and oxen.

In a short time, there were a large number of inhabitants among households, family members and employees. Later, Colonel Carlos Bernardes donated land for the construction of the Church under the patronage of São Carlos, around which the village developed. One day, some missionary friars, passing by the shores of the lake, observed reflections of the sun on the waters. They referred to the place as “Lagoa da Prata”. An excerpt from the book: História de Lagoa da Prata, by Acácio Mendes, tells the story of the origin of the name of what would then be the municipality:

“One day some Franciscan Friars who were preaching Missions came to the edge of this dam and who, naturally to have a snack and rest for a few hours, on a calm day, the sun at its height and when the waters of the dam, serene and gentle, they were shaken by the breath of the breeze that calmly made a reflection on the surface of the water. On that occasion the rays of the sun in those ebbs gave the impression of silver coins falling on the waters; and then from that comment was the memory of silver falling into the pond. And right at the first landing, as in the others, whenever the friars wanted to refer to that lake where they had rested and which still had no name, they would say: – 'In the silver lake', and the friars by "silver lake" and the aka was then replacing the plural by the simplest: Lagoa da Prata. So, when Carlos Bernardes, in 1875, built his mansion in its surroundings, he already found Lagoa da Prata named”.

Carlos Bernardes died suddenly in 1900. At the 1st Mass in the chapel still under construction, Monsignor Otaviano José de Araújo, vicar of Santo Antônio do Monte gave the chapel the name of São Carlos and called on the people to change the name of the place, which is renamed São Carlos do Pântano. However, in 1916, even with the name change, in the creation of the railway and stop that passed through the region, the residents baptized the new station with the name of the lagoon, thus inaugurating the Lagoa da Prata Station. The village was subordinated to the municipality of Santo Antônio do Monte for a while, separating from it over the decades.

In 1923 the District of Lagoa da Prata was created, and in 1938 came its separation and emancipation, becoming the Municipality of Lagoa da Prata. The flat topography and the fertility of the land attracted migrants and companies. The municipality became a major producer of cereals, sugar cane and had a significant bovine herd. With the establishment of the sugar industry and candies and caramels, a new influx of people was created.

=== Modern day ===
The downtown region of Lagoa da Prata is situated on smooth wavy terrain, and at the end of the high road is a church which overlooks the city. Usina Luciânia was a residential neighbourhood situated approximately 6 km away from downtown, but nowadays it is an industrial site owned by Louis Dreyfus Group.

In 1968, a series of beaches were constructed on the border of the lagoon to attract tourists. Today, the beaches remain Lagoa da Prata's main tourist attraction. Other tourist attractions include the Lagô Pirô, Ponte de Ferro ("Bridge of Iron" in English) which is a bridge that crosses the São Francisco River, a cachoeira da Cemiguinha ("The Cemiguinha Waterfall" in English) and a series of painted caves and grottos.

The bus station ("Rodoviária") is called Terminal Rodoviária Pedro Roberto Amorim after the mayor who commissioned its construction.

== Geography ==
Lagoa da Prata is located in the Midwest of Minas Gerais, in Alto São Francisco, with an area of 439,984 km², 211 km from Belo Horizonte, the state capital.

The municipality of Lagoa da Prata is located at 658 meters of altitude and its predominant climate is the Tropical with dry season (Aw). The annual average temperature is 21.8 °C, and in summer it can pass around 30 °C and in winter it can reach less than 10 °C.

The city has two well-defined seasons: a hot and rainy summer between the months of October and March, and a cold and dry winter between May and September. The average annual precipitation is 1512mm.

The predominant natural vegetation cover is the Cerrado and its variants, but today only small remnants of the natural vegetation are intact, due to the intense deforestation for cultivation of pastures and agricultural activities such as the cultivation of sugar cane.

== Demographics ==
According to the IBGE, 52,165 people lived in the municipality of Lagoa da Prata in 2019, 97.7% of whom lived in the urban area and only 2.3% in the rural area.

=== Ethnicities and migration ===
Lagoa da Prata is a multiracial city, result of migration. As well as the population of Minas Gerais in general, the Lagopratense population was formed by a great diversity of peoples, including amerindians, portugueses and africans.

In the 2010 IBGE Census, in a self-declaration survey, of the 45,984 inhabitants of the city, there were 25,903 Whites (56.33%), 16.221 Pardos (35.28%), 3,776 Blacks (8.21%) and 83 Asians (0.18%).

It is also remarkable the presence of descendants of European peoples who have recently migrated to the city, most of whom are Italian and to a lesser extent, German, Dutch, Spanish, Russian and French. Descendants of Asian peoples are also present, mainly of Japanese, Chinese and Lebanese origins.

=== Religion ===
According to data from the Brazilian Institute of Geography and Statistics (IBGE), in 2010 the population of Lagoa da Prata was 37,627 Roman Catholics (81.83%), 7.165 Protestants (15.58%), 330 Jehovah's Witnesses ( 0.72%), 237 Spiritists (0.52%), 47 Indigenous Traditions (0.1%) and 1.258 no-religious (2.73%).

== Economy ==
Three large industries are installed in the city, which heat up the local economy and employ a large part of the population: Embaré (food industry); Biosev (agricultural industry) and Pharlab (pharmaceutical industry). In addition to these, trade is very important for the local economy, especially that related to the bicycle and motorcycle industry, such as LM Motos, LM Bike, Athor Bike, Total Maxparts and Gominha Pneus.

== Etymology ==
In English, "Lagoa da Prata" means "Silver Lagoon", the name of the lagoon which the city is named after. It is called Silver Lagoon due to the silver sheen the clean water reflects when the sun shines on it. Its striking colour has led to priests and missionaries visiting the city.

== Notable people ==
- Gilberto Silva, Brazilian former professional footballer. Played in 3 FIFA World Cups (2002, 2006 and 2010) being champion with the Brazil national team in 2002.
- Núbia Soares, triple jumper athlete and brazilian representant in the 2016 and 2020 Summer Olympic Games.

== Gallery ==
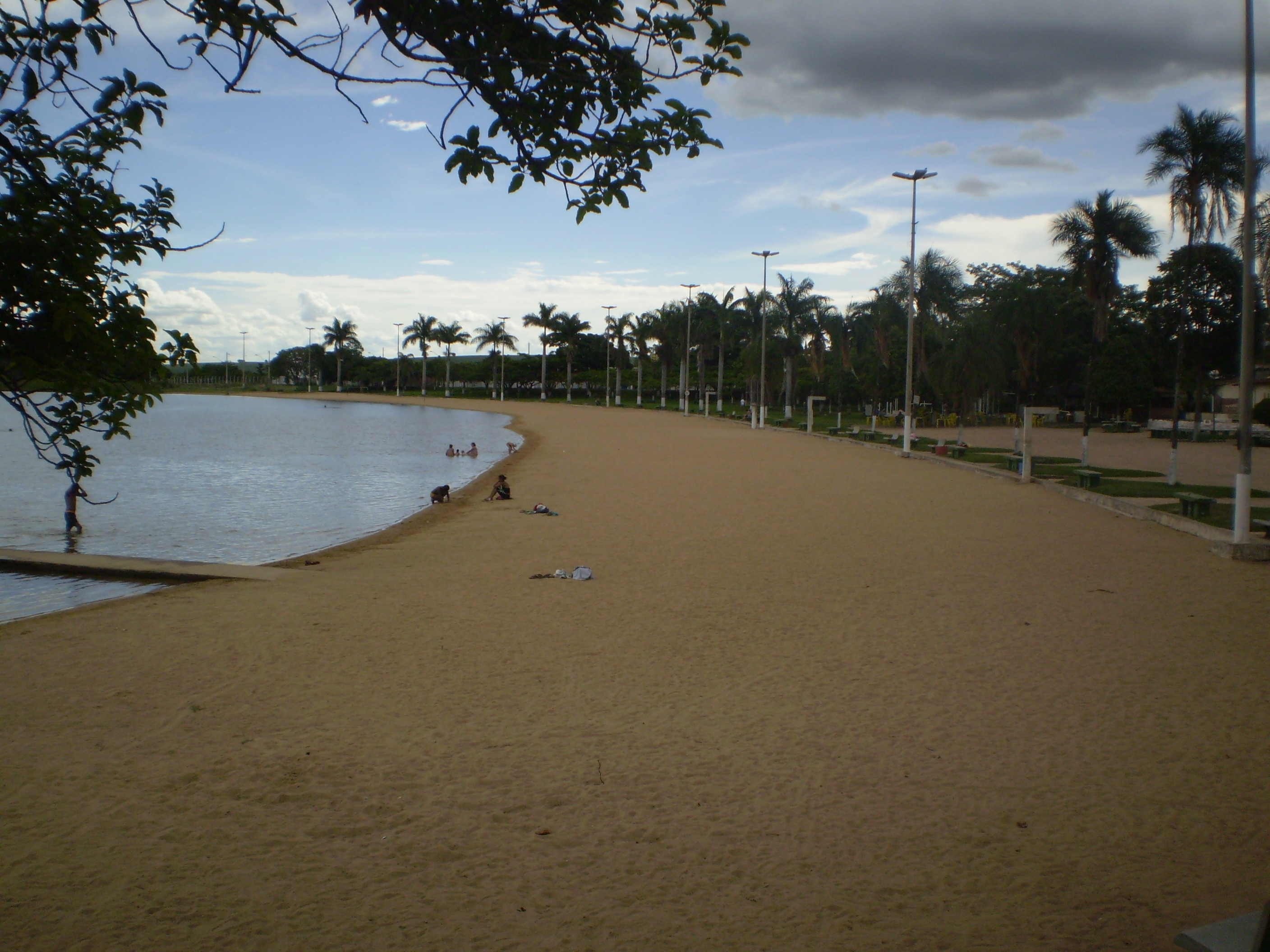
The lake has an artificial beach.

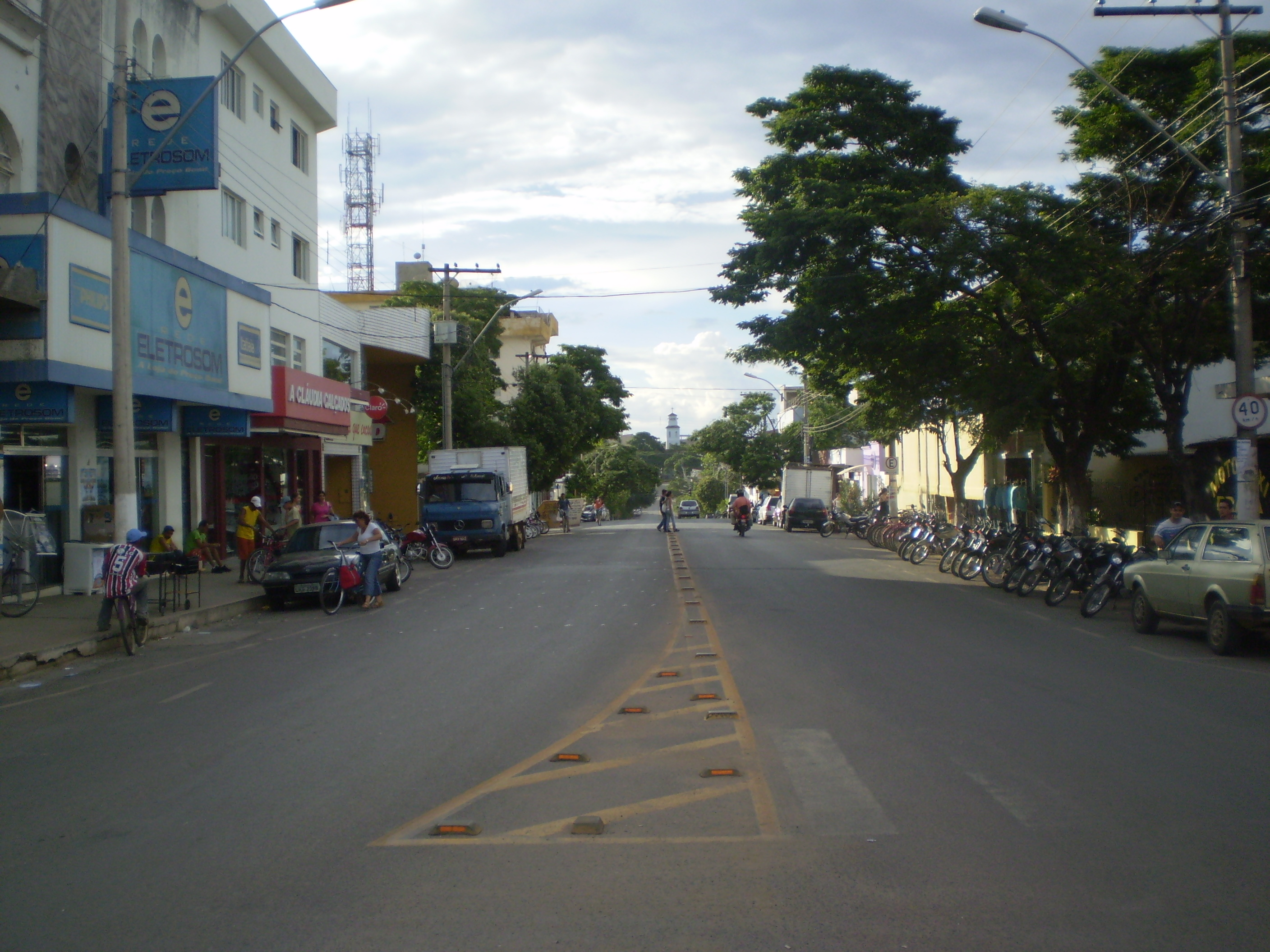
Today, the main road is overlooked by a church.

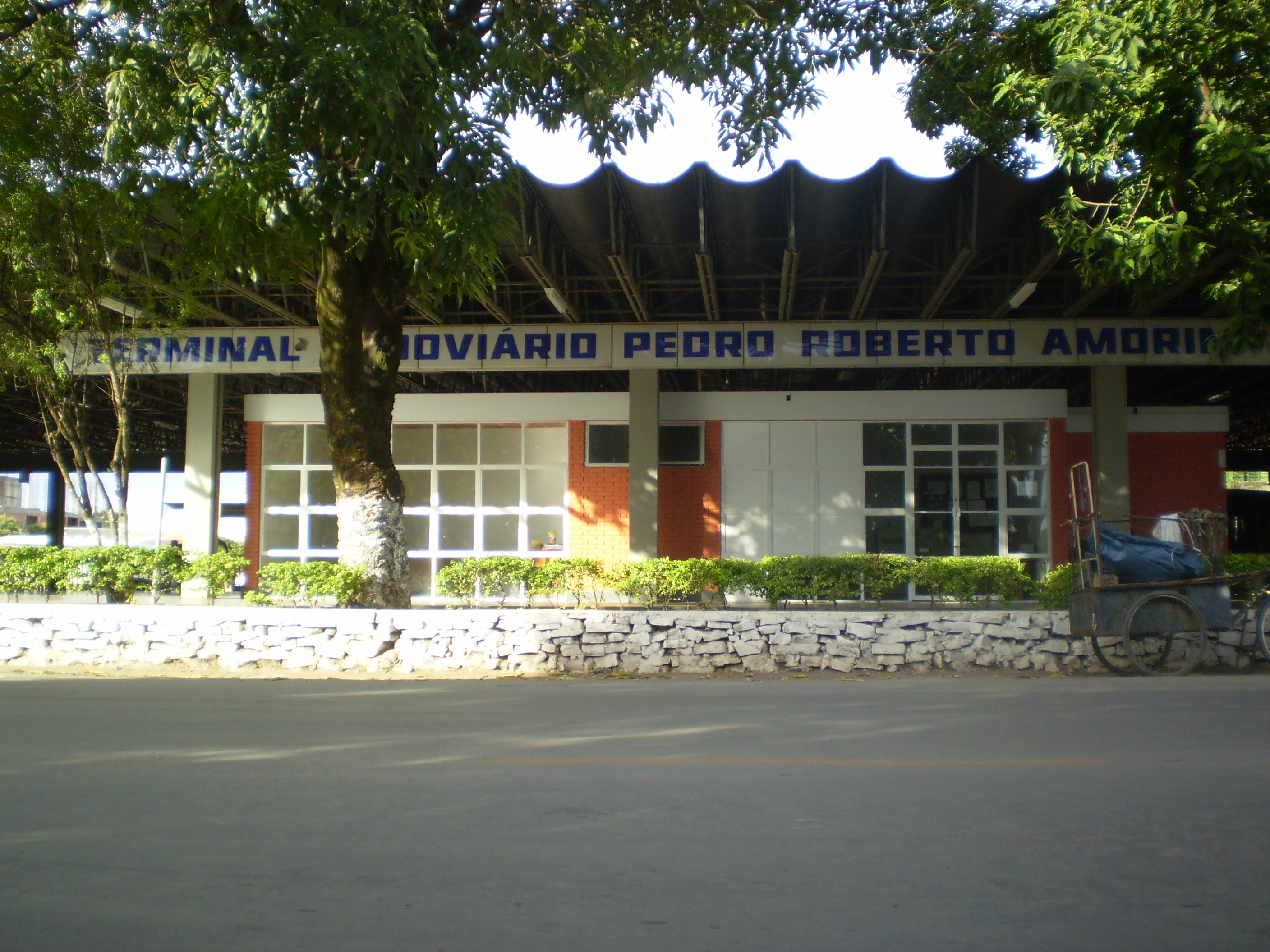
The rodoviaria at Lagoa da Prata.
