= Immediate Geographic Region of Ituiutaba =

Urban administrative region in Minas Gerais, Brazil

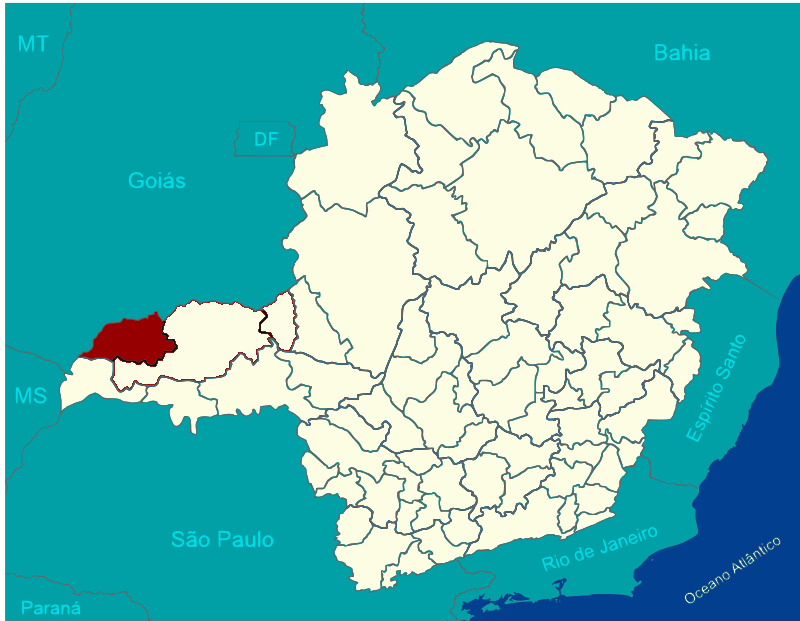
Immediate Geographic Region of Ituiutaba, in the state of Minas Gerais, Brazil.

The Immediate Geographic Region of Ituiutaba is one of the 3 immediate geographic regions in the Intermediate Geographic Region of Uberlândia, one of the 70 immediate geographic regions in the Brazilian state of Minas Gerais and one of the 509 of Brazil, created by the National Institute of Geography and Statistics (IBGE) in 2017.

== Municipalities ==
It comprises 6 municipalities.

- Cachoeira Dourada
- Capinópolis
- Gurinhatã
- Ipiaçu
- Ituiutaba
- Santa Vitória

== See also ==
- List of Intermediate and Immediate Geographic Regions of Minas Gerais
