= Orlando Sabino =

Suspected Brazilian serial killer

- Born: Orlando Sabino Camargo; September 4, 1946; Arapongas, Brazil
- Died: June 8, 2013 (aged 66); Barbacena, Brazil
- Other name: "Monster of Capinópolis"
- Height: 1.65 m (5 ft 5 in)
- Conviction: Murder
- Penalty: 38 years imprisonment

Details
- Victims: 12?
- Country: Brazil
- States: Minas Gerais, Goiás

Orlando Sabino Camargo (September 4, 1946 – June 8, 2013), known as the Monster of Capinópolis, was a Brazilian suspected serial killer charged with the murder of 12 people using revolvers and rifles, as well as with the beating and stabbing of 19 calves to death with a sickle in the regions of Triângulo Mineiro; Alto Paranaíba, and in southern Goiás. Sabino was also accused committing numerous crimes such as theft, robbery and rape.

Sabino was described as a short, shallow man of frightened and introverted look, with features reminiscent of the autistic spectrum due to his lack of reaction to a firearm discharge from a nearby officer at the time of his capture.

There are many theories that point at Brazil's Military Dictatorship which took place in the years Sabino was active, holding the government responsible for this crimes, which would have been done for political reasons. These theories have never been confirmed. Sabino was considered a symbolic figure in local folklore at the time of his activities, as many people thought he was endowed with supernatural abilities because of his insight, strength and his level of dangerousness.

== Life ==
Little is known about Sabino's life prior to his criminal activities, since he was the source of information about his origins. Orlando Sabino Camargo is said to have been born in Arapongas, in a furniture shop in northern Paraná, on September 4, 1946. Son of farmer couple Jorge Francisco and Benedita Rodrigues, he was the oldest of seven children. Sabino ran away from home to work in another farm in his early twenties, after witnessing his father being murdered by his boss.

When he returned home, his family was nowhere to be found and so Sabino became a drifter.

== Crimes and Capture ==
After traveling for miles, he arrived at the Alto Paranaíba region, where he was accused of practicing robbery in the region of Araxá and murder in Patrocínio and Coromandel in late 1971. Sabino then travelled to the southern area of Minas Gerais, where he allegedly committed homicides in Davinópolis and Ouvidor's outskirts, before heading to Tupaciguara, Centralina, Capinópolis and Canápolis. Sabino was known for invading farms and spending long periods free of human contact, sneaking through the vegetation.

Around 300 men were part of his manhunt, from military and civil police officers, cavalry, agents of Brazil's then active Department of Political and Social Order (DOPS), detectives, Army officers; all of which were helped by armed volunteers, farmers and hunters. Numbers, nonetheless, are exaggerated.

Army troops [which] are manoeuvring in the Chanel of São Simão, Cemig's and FAB's helicopters, besides new reinforcements of PMMG's detection dogs will be deployed today in pursuit of the madman spreading panic in the region of Ituitaba, after killing 25 people - 13 in Minas [Gerais] and 12 in Goiás. [...] starting today [the police operation] will have helicopters and over 180 Army soldiers, increasing numbers to over a thousand participants in the manhunt.

While the police and Army laid siege to capture the Monster of Capinópolis, rural population lived in panic: farms were abandoned, the rice harvest was delayed; a small rural exodus happened since many started looking for cities' safety, which also caused a supply crisis and extra costs for municipal administrations. Operation's headquarters, Capinópolis' municipality almost went bankrupt.

Sabino was eventually captured in Ipiaçu, on the banks of the Tejuco River on March 10, 1972, after seventeen days of persecution; the largest manhunt ever held in the state, with over two hundred policemen on patrol.

After being arrested, a filthy Sabino was displayed in public squares to the local population, in each town he had committed crimes; where he would also be judged by those crimes.

During questioning in Tupaciguara on March 20, 1972, Sabino confessed to have murdered Antenor Lourenço and Inês Fernandes dos Santos. According to the attorney Mário José de Faria, Orlando detailed the murders and thefts by him committed, however, Faria stated that "If you asked if he had built Brasília, he'd say yes; if he had bombed Hiroshima, he answered he did. So I urged the judge for [Orlando's] sanity to be examined, urgent."

Faria also stated "We stood before a criminally irresponsible being, a being who killed; a psychopath."

On April 27, 1972, Sabino was taken to the Penitentiary Antônio Dutra Ladeira, in Ribeirão das Neves, near the capital Belo Horizonte.

== Aftermath ==
On May 29, 1972, judge José Affonso da Costa Cortes ruled Orlando Sabino was to be hospitalized in an asylum:

[...] the accused presented [...] accentuated indications of dangerousness, fact, we believe, that cannot be contested in any way. [...] Considering the provisional application of this measure not possible, including in the developing of the police investigation [...], [I] determine that the accused shall be committed [...], in order to be submitted to medical examinations, for the verification of article 22 of the Penal Code's disposition.

The judge of Coromandel would rule the same, and Sabino would be submitted to examinations on August 27, 1973. Orlando was diagnosed with an intellectual disability, absolved from his crimes in 1977 and placed under security measures.

Sabino's case was studied by researchers and exemplifies problems with the Brazilian juridical system at the time, since the same defendant was judged in different municipalities which had poor communication between each jurisdiction. This was evidenced when Orlando was absolved for the murder of Oprínio Ismael de Nascimento in 1994, due to lack of a murder weapon, 22 years after the crime.

On October 6, 2008, the judge of Patrocínio ruled Sabino's sentence extinct. Still, Coromandel's late verification would prompt the serial killer's release to be postponed to August 31, 2009, after completing his 38 years and 6 months sentence in the Judicial Hospital Professor Mario Vaz. On April 1, 2011, he was admitted to an almshouse for the elderly.

== Death ==
Sabino was found dead on the morning of June 8, 2013, in the almshouse he had been admitted two years before, in Barbacena, by one of the staff. The cause of death was identified as a heart attack.

Orlando Sabino is buried in Santo Antônio Cemetery in Barbacena.

== Documentary ==
Rede Record's local news branch based in Uberlândia "Tudo em Dia" produced a documentary based on the book "The Monster of Capinópolis" written by local journalist Pedro Popó.

== See also ==
- List of serial killers by country
- List of serial killers by number of victims
