= Immediate Geographic Region of Uberlândia =

Urban administrative region in Minas Gerais, Brazil

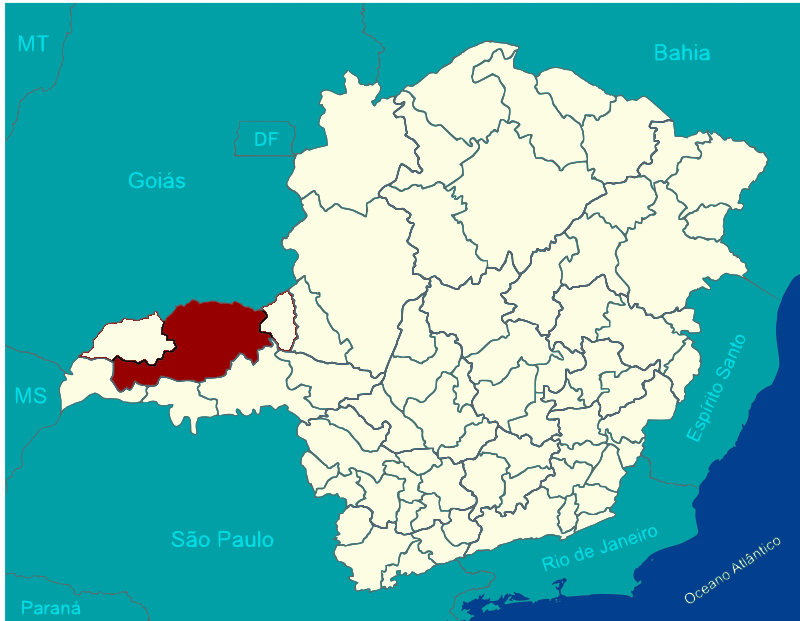
Immediate Geographic Region of Uberlândia, in the state of Minas Gerais, Brazil.

The Immediate Geographic Region of Uberlândia is one of the 3 immediate geographic regions in the Intermediate Geographic Region of Uberlândia, one of the 70 immediate geographic regions in the Brazilian state of Minas Gerais and one of the 509 of Brazil, created by the National Institute of Geography and Statistics (IBGE) in 2017.

== Municipalities ==
It comprises 11 municipalities.

- Araguari
- Araporã
- Campina Verde
- Canápolis
- Cascalho Rico
- Centralina
- Indianópolis
- Monte Alegre de Minas
- Prata
- Tupaciguara
- Uberlândia

== See also ==
- List of Intermediate and Immediate Geographic Regions of Minas Gerais
