= Ituiutaba =

City and municipality in the state of Minas Gerais state, Brazil

- Municipality
- Municipality of Ituiutaba
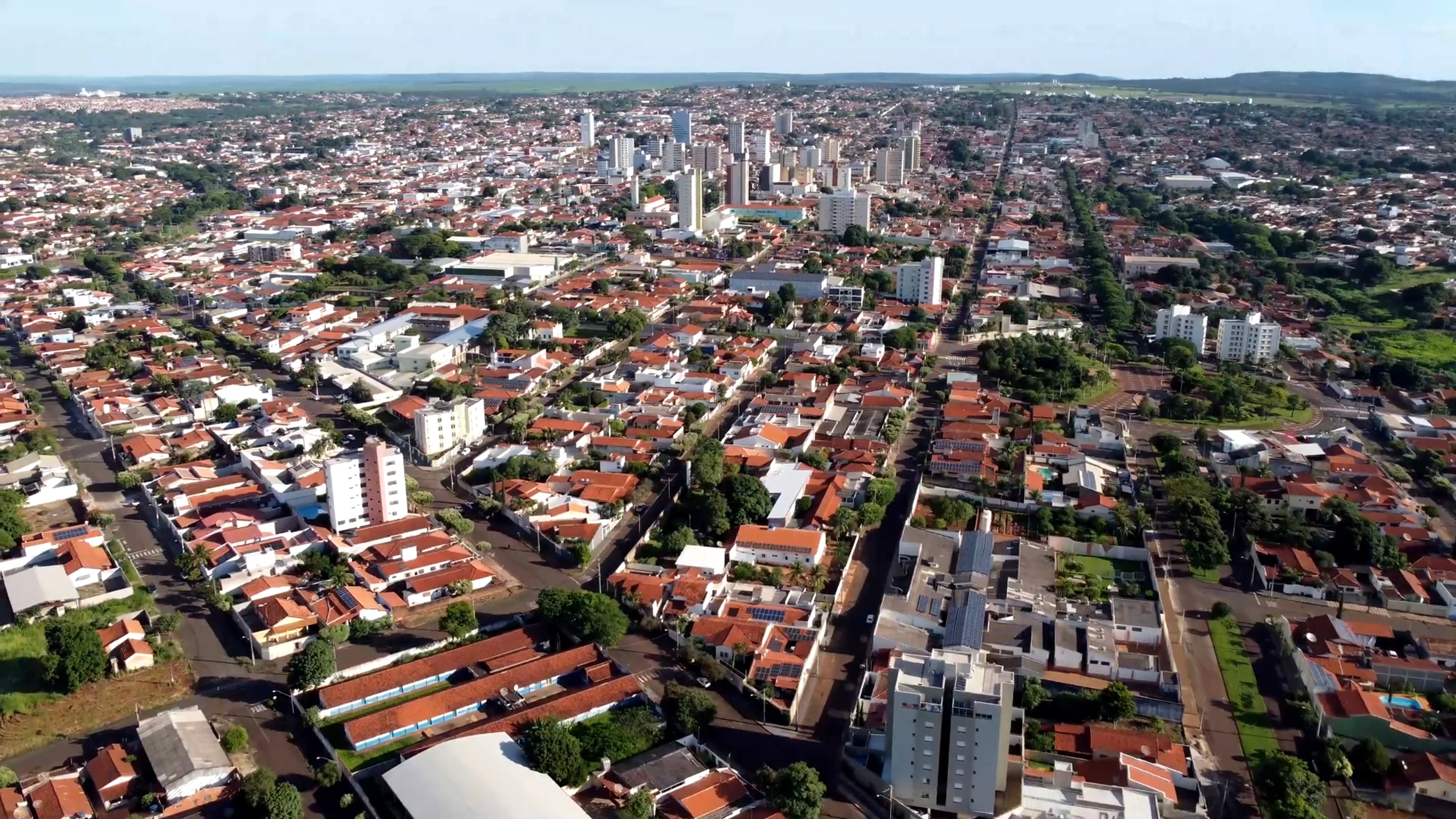
- Aerial view of Ituiutaba

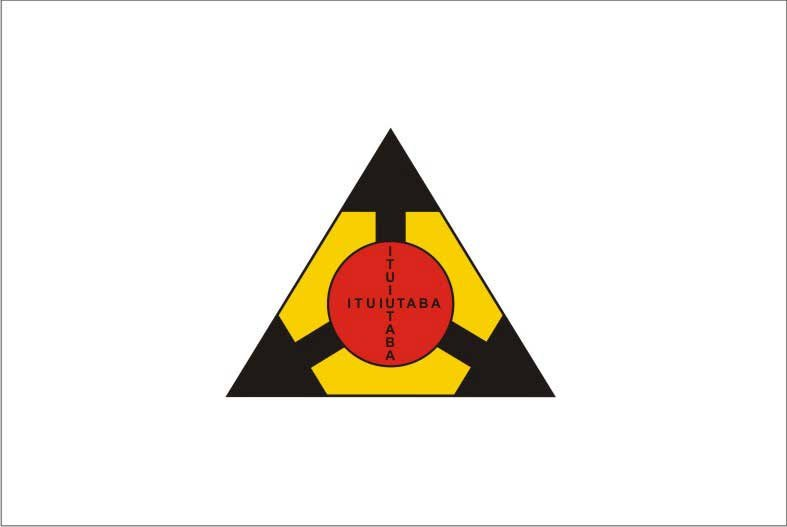
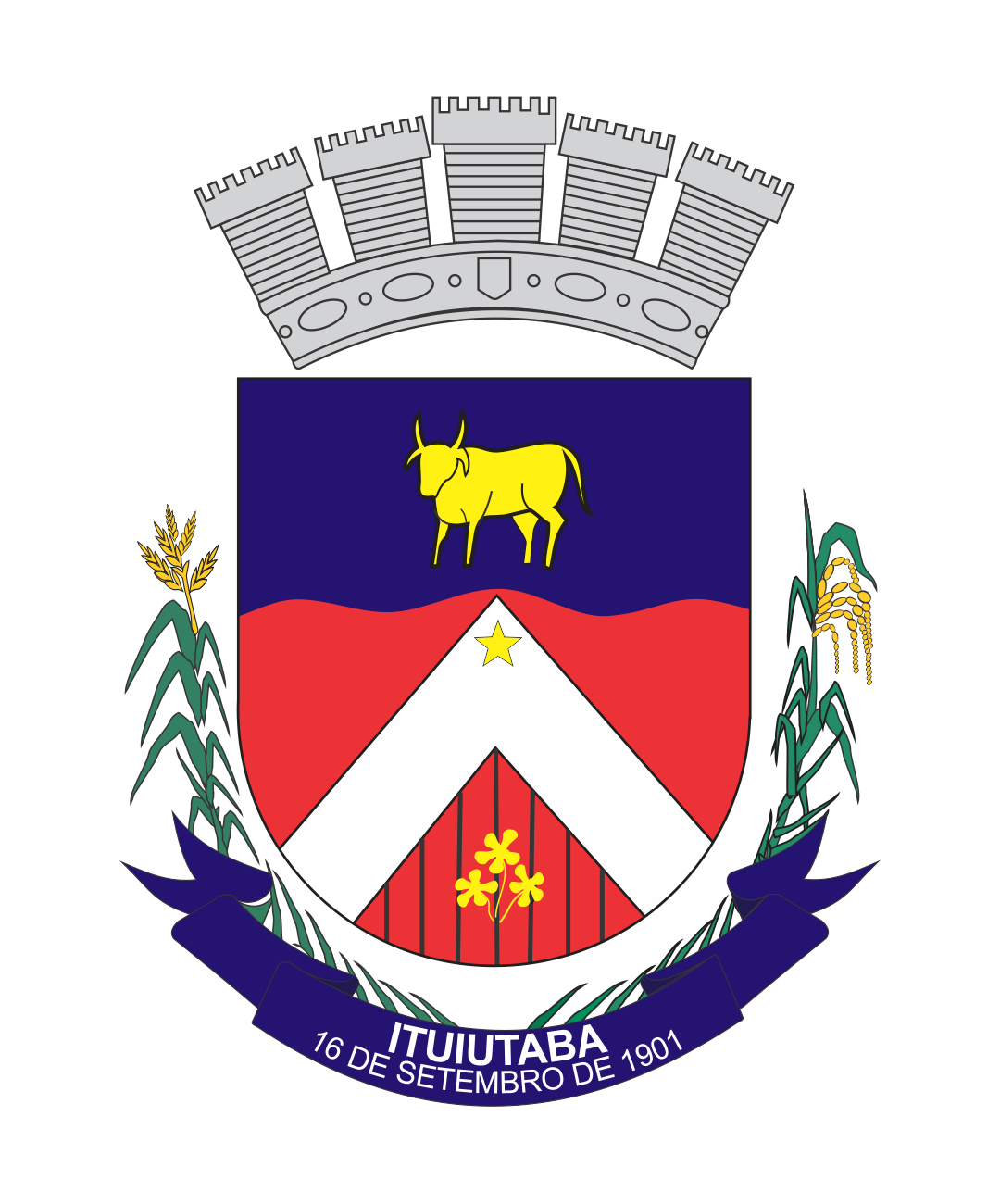
- Flag Coat of arms

- Coordinates: 18°58′08″S 49°27′54″W
- Country: Brazil
- State: Minas Gerais
- Founded: 1901

Area
  - Total: 2,598 km^{2} (1,003 sq mi)
- Elevation: 605 m (1,985 ft)

Population (2022 Census)
  - Total: 102,217
  - Estimate (2025): 106,775
- Website: www.ituiutaba.mg.gov.br

Ituiutaba (Brazilian Portuguese: /itujuˈtabɐ/) is a municipality in the western part of the state of Minas Gerais, Brazil. Elevated to city status in 1901, its population in 2022 Census was 102,217 and a total area in the municipality of 2,598 km^{2}. The elevation of the seat of the municipality is 544 m.

== Geography ==
It is located in the west of the economic and geographical region called Triângulo Mineiro and is on BR 365, which begins at Chaveslândia in the west and connects as far as Pirapora in the north. Neighboring municipalities are Gurinhatã, Ipiaçú, Capinópolis, Canápolis, Santa Vitória, Monte Alegre de Minas, Prata, Campina Verde and the state of Goiás.

=== Distances ===
- Uberlândia: 135 km
- Uberaba: 237 km
- Itumbiara: 110 km
- Chaveslândia: 135 km
- Belo Horizonte: 685 km

=== Statistical Microregion ===
Ituiutaba is also the name of statistical microregion 29 which includes 6 municipalities: Cachoeira Dourada, Capinópolis, Gurinhatã, Ipiaçu, Ituiutaba, and Santa Vitória. The population of this microregion was 135,140 (2000) and the area was 8,748.90 km^{2}. The population density in 2000 was 15.45 inhabitants/km^{2}.

=== Climate ===
Classified as AW hot-humid (according to the Koppen classification), tropical with dry winter, with a well-defined rainy season from October to April and a dry season from May to September. Average temperatures range from 14 °C in June to 31 °C in December. The yearly average is 28 °C. Frost is rare.

Climate data for Ituiutaba (1981–2010)
| Month | Jan | Feb | Mar | Apr | May | Jun | Jul | Aug | Sep | Oct | Nov | Dec | Year |
|---|---|---|---|---|---|---|---|---|---|---|---|---|---|
| Mean daily maximum °C (°F) | 31.5 (88.7) | 31.9 (89.4) | 31.7 (89.1) | 31.5 (88.7) | 29.6 (85.3) | 29.0 (84.2) | 29.8 (85.6) | 31.8 (89.2) | 33.3 (91.9) | 33.1 (91.6) | 32.1 (89.8) | 31.4 (88.5) | 31.4 (88.5) |
| Daily mean °C (°F) | 25.4 (77.7) | 25.4 (77.7) | 25.1 (77.2) | 24.3 (75.7) | 21.5 (70.7) | 20.4 (68.7) | 20.7 (69.3) | 22.6 (72.7) | 25.1 (77.2) | 25.8 (78.4) | 25.5 (77.9) | 25.3 (77.5) | 23.9 (75.0) |
| Mean daily minimum °C (°F) | 21.1 (70.0) | 21.0 (69.8) | 20.5 (68.9) | 19.1 (66.4) | 15.4 (59.7) | 14.2 (57.6) | 13.9 (57.0) | 15.2 (59.4) | 18.6 (65.5) | 20.0 (68.0) | 20.6 (69.1) | 20.9 (69.6) | 18.4 (65.1) |
| Average precipitation mm (inches) | 305.4 (12.02) | 193.5 (7.62) | 191.9 (7.56) | 83.9 (3.30) | 37.0 (1.46) | 16.8 (0.66) | 6.5 (0.26) | 14.0 (0.55) | 49.0 (1.93) | 127.3 (5.01) | 161.5 (6.36) | 235.4 (9.27) | 1,422.2 (55.99) |
| Average precipitation days (≥ 1.0 mm 0) | 16 | 13 | 12 | 6 | 3 | 1 | 1 | 1 | 5 | 9 | 11 | 15 | 93 |
| Average relative humidity (%) | 79.1 | 77.1 | 78.2 | 74.2 | 71.6 | 68.6 | 60.9 | 53.1 | 56.3 | 64.4 | 72.3 | 77.3 | 69.4 |
| Mean monthly sunshine hours | 164.8 | 163.1 | 189.0 | 215.6 | 227.3 | 225.0 | 244.6 | 245.7 | 190.5 | 192.2 | 186.1 | 175.4 | 2,419.3 |
Source: Instituto Nacional de Meteorologia

== Economic activities ==
The most important economic activities are cattle raising, industry, commerce, and agriculture. The GDP in 2005 was R$972,529,000. Ituiutaba is in the top tier of municipalities in the state with regard to economic and social development. It is the center of a rich agricultural area which receives adequate rainfall and is well watered. As of 2007 there were 08 banking agencies in the town. There were 14,365 automobiles.

In the rural area there were 1,459 establishments occupying about 4,300 workers. 628 of the farms had tractors, a ratio of around one tractor for every two farms. There were 190,000 head of cattle in 2006. The crops with a planted area of more than 1000 hectares were sugarcane, corn and soybeans. There was also production of rubber, coffee, and oranges.

== Health and education ==
Ituiutaba has high quality of life, using Brazilian standards. The population is comparatively well-educated. According to the city government site (no date given) there were 128 doctors, 130 dentists, 13 veterinarians, 18 psychologists, 170 lawyers, 14 architects, and 111 agronomists.

In the health sector there were 54 total establishments, 23 public and 31 private. Of these there were 06 hospitals with 211 beds. In the educational sector there were 33 pre-schools, 39 primary schools and 05 middle schools. There were 03 institutes of higher education, all private.

- Municipal Human Development Index: 0.818 (2000)
- State ranking: 15 out of 853 municipalities as of 2000
- National ranking: 254 out of 5,138 municipalities as of 2000

The highest ranking municipality in Minas Gerais in 2000 was Poços de Caldas with 0.841, while the lowest was Setubinha with 0.568. Nationally the highest was São Caetano do Sul in São Paulo with 0.919, while the lowest was Setubinha. In more recent statistics (considering 5,507 municipalities) Manari in the state of Pernambuco has the lowest rating in the country—0,467—putting it in last place.

- Literacy rate: 89%
- Life expectancy: 76.0 (average of males and females)
- Urbanization rate: 51.36%
- Percentage of urban houses connected to sewage system: 99

== Media ==
There are five television stations: Rede Integração - affiliated with Rede Globo, Rede Vitoriosa - affiliated with Sistema Brasileiro de Televisão - SBT, TV Paranaiba - affiliated with Rede Record, Band Triângulo - affiliated with Band and Rede Vida. There are seven radio stations: Rádio Cancella FM, Rádio Cancella AM, Rádio Difusora FM, Rádio Difusora AM, Rádio Interativa FM, Rádio Globo AM and Rádio Dimensão FM. There are three newspapers: Jornal do Pontal, Gazeta do Pontal and Jornal Hoje em Dia.

== History ==
The settlement of the region began in 1820 when Joaquim Antonio de Morais and José da Silva Ramos arrived and expelled the native inhabitants, the Caiapós. The first name was Arraial de São José do Tijuco. In 1890 there were 5,000 inhabitants. In 1901 it became a municipality with the name Vila Platina, later changed in 1917 to Ituiutaba.

Unveiling the congado history in Ituiutaba-MG

In Ituiutaba reportedly some Congadeiros, the festivities took place on farms outside the city where they also raised their suits. With the becoming of time, the festival has become known, was brought to the city. However, the parish priest of the time did not accept that Congadeiros walk into the church, prohibiting the holding of the festival site. This ban was because the Congadeiros, did not follow the Catholic religion, but others of African origin. Meanwhile, around Ituiutaba, to honor his wife Geralda Ramos da Silva on his birthday on April 2, 1951, Mr. Demetrio Silva da Costa (Cyzicus) invited his father Marciano Silvestre da Costa, his brother Gerard Clarimundo Coast and several other friends to play Mozambique and commemorate the date. Upon learning of the incident, Ana Carolina Ribeiro (Dona Rosa), cousin of Cyzicus, invited the group to work together to bring the suit in Mozambique Ituiutaba and rekindle the devotion to St. Benedict with much dancing, partying and devotion. So they went to the parish priest of the time, Father John Ave, to communicate it and ask him to leave, next to the church, making the feast of St. Benedict and Our Lady of the Rosary. The pastor, not allowed, claiming that the Church had problems previously with the suits Congado that formerly existed in Ituiutaba, and that because of these clashes, had already fragmentado. In 1952, the newly created suit, decided to rehearse in order placing the group properly uniformed street in protest against the attitude of the priest. They walked down the street 22 at 5 am. They made a dawn with fireworks in front of the Forum site getting the consent of justice to conduct the celebrations in the city. They went to St. Joseph Church, where he entered the enclosure and attended the morning mass. After the Congadeiros went visiting various residences singing, dancing saints protectors streets. In the following years the party happened without the existence of a fellowship or church support. Still, Congadeiros insisted on having the recognition of the celebration by the church, performing each year the festivities in honor of St. Benedict and Our Lady of the Rosary, with the support of the devotees and supporters. Years later, restructures itself in the Congado Ituiutaba.

The group now organized, lock arms with a drop of the pastor of the church, which is to make a series of these requirements to concede to the same space at the site. One of those requirements was that the Congadeiros really embrace the Catholic faith. Accepting the request of the priest they baptized, received first Eucharist, crismaram and those who were cohabiting, married in the Church. Another requirement was that the Congadeiros had active participation in religious ceremonies, just like that, the party would have some relationship with the Church. Thus the Catholic Church tried to erase their black African religious heritage, yet the Congadeiros although "Catholics" did not fail to keep their ancestral practices, even if secretly.

Before the completion of all requirements made by him, Father John Ave, in 1956, asked the Congadeiros to choose twelve couples among themselves who knew well the Catholic doctrines. Of these couples, men appointed by the priest as "The Twelve Apostles" (Marciano Silvestre da Costa, Clarimundo Geraldo da Costa, Demetrius Silva da Costa - Cyzicus, Antonio Belchior, Baldwin Anthony da Costa - Antonio Goat, Agenor Prudêncio do Nascimento, Andira Alves, Max Avelino da Costa, Jerome Ventura Keys-Dunga, Aristides da Silva, Antônio Manoel Gomes and Lord Edmund) founded the Brotherhood of St. Benedict according to the instructions of the pastor, who authorized, in 1957, the operation of the Brotherhood, by blaming it suits founded between the years 1951 to 1954 and by others who supposedly were to arise.

From the creation of the Brotherhood of St. Benedict groups Congado also now have their own religious group within the Church, which is replaced by function not only religious but also cultural, organizing and coordinating suits Congado of Ituiutaba. As listed in the Small History of the Brotherhood of St. Benedict, it was founded on 13 May 1957 with "special service" and "First Communion Benedictines of several young children and adults." It was through the creation of the Brotherhood of St. Benedict that Congadeiros won permission to celebrate in the Church. It was through her that they also raised capital to later buy the land and erect the Church of St. Benedict.

The Brotherhood was originally formed by just over 100 people; today it includes over 600 individuals. She has become the guarantee of Congadeiros "law of the Church"; their creation and foundation opened the doors to the consolidation of suits and became the foundation for what emerged. The feast in honor of St. Benedict is composed of seven suits Congado the participation of several others from the surrounding cities that participate in the celebrations for several years.

== See also ==
- List of municipalities in Minas Gerais
