= Donizetti (disambiguation) =

Gaetano Donizetti (1797–1848) was an Italian composer.

Donizetti may also refer to:

== People ==
=== Surname ===
- Aparecido Donizetti (born 1973), also known as Doni, Brazilian footballer
- Armelino Donizetti Quagliato (born 1965), known as Zetti, Brazilian footballer and manager
- Elpídio Donizetti (born 1956), Brazilian jurist, chief judge of the court of appeal of Minas Gerais
- Giuseppe Donizetti (1788–1856), Instructor General of the Imperial Ottoman Music, brother of Gaetano
- Mario Donizetti (born 1932), Italian painter
- Sérgio Luís Donizetti (born 1964), known as João Paulo, Brazilian footballer

=== Given name ===
- Donizetti Tavares de Lima (1882–1961), Brazilian Roman Catholic priest

== Buildings ==
- Conservatorio Gaetano Donizetti, conservatory in Bergamo, Italy
- Teatro Donizetti, opera house in Bergamo, Italy
  - Donizetti Monument, adjacent to the opera house
- Donizetti's birthplace in Bergamo, Italy

== Other uses ==
- 9912 Donizetti, main-belt asteroid
- SS Gaetano Donizetti, Italian ship sunk in September 1943
