= Phoenix Affirmations =

Progressive Christian statement of faith

The Phoenix Affirmations is a set of twelve principles originally penned by a group of clergy and laypeople from Phoenix, Arizona, in an attempt to articulate clearly the broad strokes of the emerging Christian faith. Pastors, theologians, and biblical scholars from every mainline denomination, with degrees from major seminaries and divinity schools, added input. The first published commentary on The Phoenix Affirmations appeared in 2006 (Jossey-Bass), written by Dr. Eric Elnes. According to Phyllis Tickle, author of The Great Emergence, Elnes’ The Phoenix Affirmations: A New Vision for the Future of Christianity stands today as the clearest, most articulate presentation of Progressive Christianity. The Phoenix Affirmations have been widely adopted by Christian organizations who identify themselves as "progressive."

The Phoenix Affirmations take on a threefold structure, based on the Three Great Loves identified by Jesus and affirmed within Judaism: Love of God, Love of Neighbor, and Love of Self. (Matthew 22:34-40//Mark 12:28-31//Luke 10:25-28; cf. Deuteronomy 6:5; Leviticus 19:18) The Phoenix Affirmations are not meant to be a static set of principles to stand for all time. The authors attached a version number to them—currently 3.8—indicating that the Affirmations are the product of continual modification and may be amended in the future in light of new awareness and deeper understanding of what is believed to be God's call. In contrast to a Creed, the Affirmations are not meant to serve as a test of faith against which a person's Christian commitments are to be verified. Diana Butler Bass described the Phoenix Affirmations as follows: "Together, they spell out the theological basis of Protestant liberality: being open and humble, yet grounded in the biblical story of God's dream for humankind."

In 2006, some members of an organization called CrossWalk America spent 5 months, walking 2,500 miles from Phoenix, AZ, to Washington, D.C., to deliver a set of The Phoenix Affirmations as part of a Labor Day Rally. This walk was the subject of the feature-length film, The Asphalt Gospel as well as the book, Asphalt Jesus: Finding A New Christian Faith Along the Highways of America, which also contains specific commentary on the Affirmations.

John Shelby Spong, theologian and author, was present in Washington at the end of the walk. Spong wrote: “The Phoenix Affirmations call on Christians to love God in all of God’s expressions, to love our neighbors, including our neighbors who call God by a different name and even our neighbors who use the literal texts of the Bible as a weapon with which to attack the objects of their prejudice, and finally to love ourselves, just as we are, male, female, black, white, brown, gay, straight, transgender, bisexual, learned and unlearned, left-handed and right-handed, indeed in all of the rich variety of the human family. We are to stand as one against any religious system that encourages self-hatred, that manipulates through guilt, or that presents God as a punishing parent who delights in our groveling before the throne of grace.”

THE PHOENIX AFFIRMATIONS Version 3.8

CHRISTIAN LOVE OF GOD INCLUDES:

1. Walking fully in the Path of Jesus without denying the legitimacy of other paths that God may provide for humanity.

2. Listening for God's Word, which comes through daily prayer and meditation, studying the ancient testimonies which we call Scripture, and attending to God's present activity in the world.

3. Celebrating the God whose Spirit pervades and whose glory is reflected in all of God's Creation, including the earth and its ecosystems, the sacred and secular, the Christian and non-Christian, the human and non-human.

4. Expressing our love in worship that is as sincere, vibrant, and artful as it is scriptural.

CHRISTIAN LOVE OF NEIGHBOR INCLUDES:

5. Engaging people authentically, as Jesus did, treating all as creations made in God's very image, regardless of race, gender, sexual orientation, age, physical or mental ability, nationality, or economic class.

6. Standing, as Jesus does, with the outcast and oppressed, the denigrated and afflicted, seeking peace and justice with or without the support of others.

7. Preserving religious freedom and the church's ability to speak prophetically to government by resisting the commingling of church and state.

8. Walking humbly with God, acknowledging our own shortcomings while honestly seeking to understand and call forth the best in others, including those who consider us their enemies.

CHRISTIAN LOVE OF SELF INCLUDES:

9. Basing our lives on the faith that in Christ all things are made new and that we, and all people, are loved beyond our wildest imaginations—for eternity.

10. Claiming the sacredness of both our minds and our hearts, and recognizing that faith and science, doubt and belief serve the pursuit of truth.

11. Caring for our bodies and insisting on taking time to enjoy the benefits of prayer, reflection, worship, and recreation in addition to work.

12. Acting on the faith that we are born with a meaning and purpose, a vocation and ministry that serve to strengthen and extend God's realm of love.
