= Banana production in Brazil =

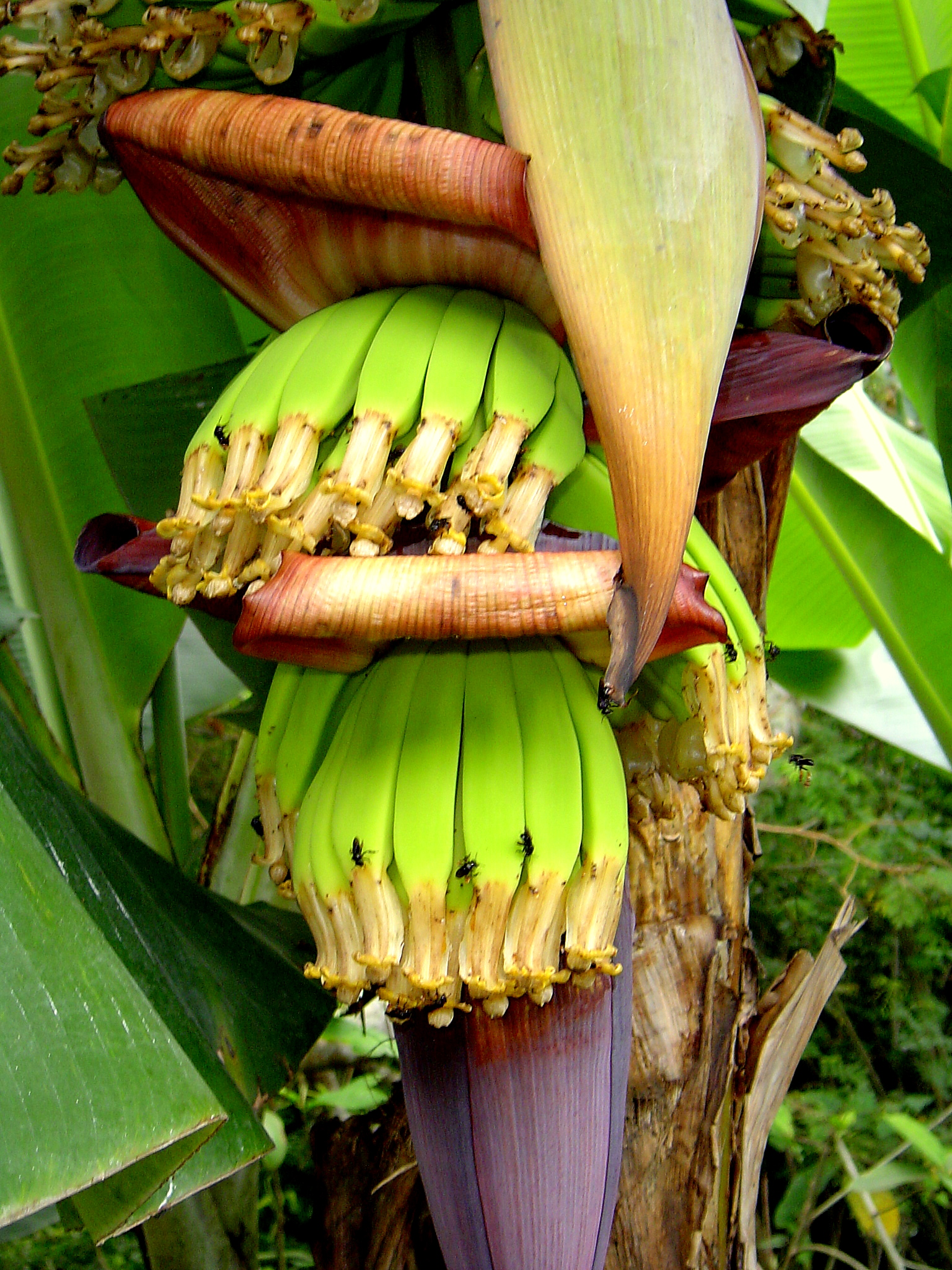
Bananas under growth

Banana production in Brazil accounts for approximately 10% of the entire world banana production, making Brazil a major banana-producing country. Production has steadily increased over the years, rising from 5.4 million tonnes in 1997 to almost 7 million tonnes in 2007. In 2000, Brazil was fourth, behind India, Uganda and Ecuador, in banana production. By 2006, Brazil became the second largest banana-producer, behind only India, followed by China, Ecuador and the Philippines. Most of the bananas produced are consumed domestically. Gross exports has increased from 12.5 thousand tonnes in 1995 to more than 220 thousand tonnes in 2002 and 2003, mostly to neighbours Argentina and Uruguay, but these figures are still far behind industry leaders such as Ecuador, Costa Rica, the Philippines and Colombia which export more than a million tonnes of bananas annually.

Brazil produces and consumes Cavendish, apple and fruit bananas and the main producer in Brazil is in the southeastern state of São Paulo with 16.4% of the Brazilian market, according to the Brazilian Institute of Geography and Statistics (IBGE). Other notable areas where bananas in Brazil are cultivated include Prata in North-East Brazil; Belo Horizonte, Vitoria, Rio de Janeiro and Florianópolis in the southern and south-eastern regions. As of 2004, 6.6 million tons of bananas were produced, with a turnover of a little in excess US$ 1 billion.

Genetic research into banana production and scientific studies is helping to maximise output and quality, in addition to increasing resistance to disease increasingly as the country is developing. Notably the programme has done much since 2002 to curtail the effects of the black sigatoka which previously caused widespread disaster to banana plantations in the Amazon. The Brazilian Banana Genome program is also supported by the National Council for Scientific and Technological Development (CNPq) internationally with support from experts in countries such as France and Belgium, UK, Japan and the Czech Republic. Apart from molecular genomics research, Embrapa also has a successful banana breeding program, generating disease-resistant varieties, such as the Pacovan Ken. Pacovan Ken, a banana breed resistant to yellow and black sigatoka and to Panama disease launched in November 2001 as a national crop plant in Brazil, is named after Embrapa scientist Kenneth Shepherd.
