= Stuart M. Matlins =

Religious Scholar

- Born: 25 July 1940 (age 86); New York
- Occupations: Economist, writer
- Known for: Interfaith work
- Notable work: How to Be a Perfect Stranger: The Essential Religious Etiquette Handbook

Stuart M. Matlins (born July 25, 1940) is an economist and religious scholar best known for his interfaith work.

== Early life and career ==
Stuart Matlins was born in 1940 in New York City to Louis and Lillian Matlins. He attended London School of Economics from 1958 to 1959 and received a BS in 1960 from the University of Wisconsin, then a MA from Princeton University in 1962, followed by postgraduate studies. Matlins worked for the U.S. Department of Commerce, before going to work for Booz Allen & Hamilton, where he was eventually named vice president and managing officer. He then started his own consulting firm, Stuart Matlins Associates, in 1974.

== Interfaith work ==
During the late 1970s, Matlins began writing and speaking on religion with a focus on interfaith. Matlins had grown up in a Jewish home, but through his marriage had been exposed to a wide variety of various Christian traditions. He wanted to better understand how to act while visiting those denominations and realized others may be in similar situations. He told the LA Times: “We all have relatives of different faiths. It is increasingly common for people we know, and people we work with, to invite us to their life cycle events. We all want to do what is expected of us.” In 1996, he wrote How to Be a Perfect Stranger: The Essential Religious Etiquette Handbook with Arthur J. Magida to help "well-meaning guest[s] to feel comfortable, participate to the fullest extent possible, and avoid violating anyone's religious principles-while enriching their own spiritual understanding." His books were called "important tools to help people avoid many pitfalls as they wander across the spiritual landscape." Matlins was the founder, editor-in-chief, and publisher of Jewish Lights Publishing and then, in 1999, together with Jon M. Sweeney, he cofounded SkyLight Paths Publishing.

His book How to Be a Perfect Stranger: The Essential Religious Etiquette Handbook went through multiple editions, with a second volume being added and then later combined into the original. The book has been reviewed by New York Times, Chicago Sun-Times, Midwest Book Review, and more. He also wrote books focusing on marriage and funeral aspects of different religious practices, as well as books focusing on the Jewish faith.

Matlins co-founded an "innovative" synagogue in rural Vermont with his wife, and served as its lay leader for nineteen years. He also served on the Board of Governors of Hebrew Union College-Jewish Institute of Religion for almost twenty years and was chair of the school's Board of Overseers. He was also a member of the First Catholic/Jewish Lay Conference at the Vatican in October 2007.

Matlins believes "There's no such thing as being too respectful of other people's traditions" he told The Salt Lake Tribune.

== Awards ==
- Abraham Geiger Medal (2014)
- American Jewish Distinguished Service Award (2006)

== Published works ==
- Services for Children of Alcoholics (1979)
- How to Be a Perfect Stranger: The Essential Religious Etiquette Handbook (1996)
- The Perfect Stranger's Guide to Funerals and Grieving Practices: A Guide to Etiquette in Other People's Religious Ceremonies (2000)
- The Perfect Stranger's Guide to Wedding Ceremonies: A Guide to Etiquette in Other People's Religious Ceremonies (2000)
- The Jewish Book of Grief and Healing: A Spiritual Companion for Mourning (2001)
- How to Be a Perfect Stranger, Vol. 2 (2002)
- The Jewish Lights Spirituality Handbook: A Guide to Understanding, Exploring & Living a Spiritual Life
- Jewish Men Pray: Words of Yearning, Praise, Petition, Gratitude and Wonder from Traditional and Contemporary Sources
- Hats, Mats and Hassocks: The Essential Guide to Religious Etiquette
