= Donizete =

Donizete is a given name and surname. Notable people with the name include:

- Donizete Oliveira (born 1968), Brazilian football midfielder
- Leandro Donizete (born 1982), Brazilian football midfielder
- Marinho Donizete (born 1980), Brazilian football defender
- Osmar Donizete Cândido (born 1968), Brazilian football forward
- Rubens Donizete (born 1979), Brazilian bicyclist

== See also ==
- Donizetti (disambiguation)
