= Dandara Tonantzin =

Brazilian teacher, activist and politician

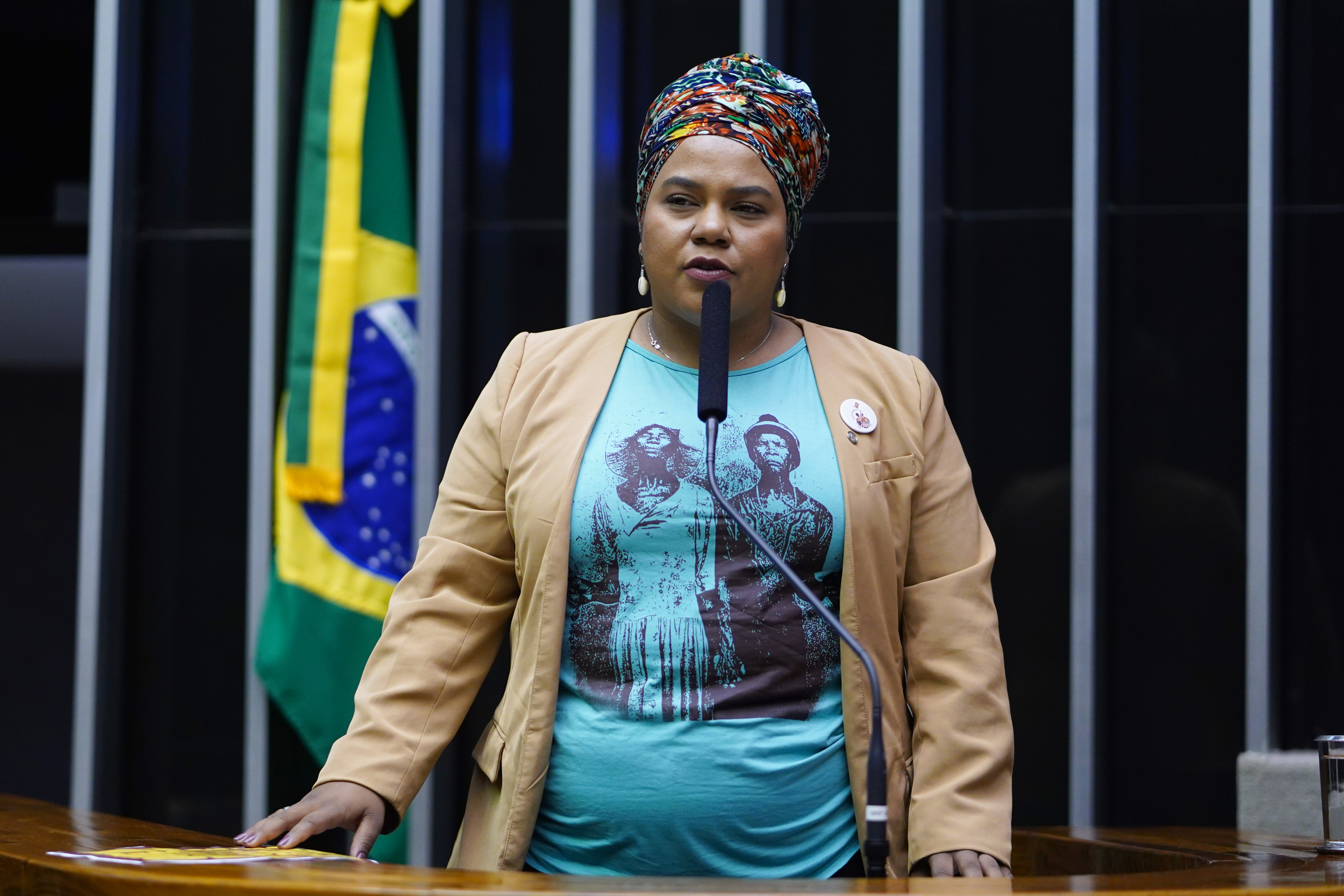
- Tonantzin in 2023

Federal Deputy for Minas Gerais
- Incumbent
- Assumed office 1 February 2023

Councilwoman of Uberlândia
- In office 1 January 2021 – 1 February 2023

Personal details
- Born: Dandara Tonantzin Silva Castro; 23 January 1994 (age 32) Gurinhatã, Minas Gerais, Brazil
- Party: PT
- Education: Federal University of Uberlândia; Federal University of Minas Gerais

Dandara Tonantzin Silva Castro (born 23 January 1994) is a Brazilian teacher, activist, and politician, affiliated with the Workers' Party (PT). She is currently a federal deputy from Minas Gerais, having assumed office in 2023.

== Biography ==
Tonantzin was born in the town of Gurinhatã, in the Triângulo Mineiro. She grew up in a favela in the Justinópolis district of Ribeirão das Neves. Her father was white and her mother was Black, with them being a philosopher and a teacher respectively. As an adolescent, she moved to Uberlândia. She began to become politically engaged in secondary school, establishing groups and protesting against an increase in bus fares. She is bisexual.

She began to attend the Federal University of Uberlândia (UFU) at 16, graduating with a teaching degree. She later graduated with a master's degree from the Federal University of Minas Gerais (UFMG). She continued her activism being the student president of her school's Academic Directory (student coordinating committee) for her course program, coordinator-general for the Student's Central Directory, and the director of educational politics with the Minas Gerais State Students' Union. She also was active with the National Collective of Black Youth (Enegrecer) and worked as a councilor with the National Council of the Promotion of Racial Equality.

She is an ardent defender of the affirmative action system in Brazil, and credits this with expanding opportunities for Black and racially mixed students, herself having been accepted into UFU through affirmative action.

=== Political career ===
In 2020, she became a candidate for Uberlândia city council, being elected with 5,237 votes, becoming the most elected candidate in that election. In 2022, she became a candidate for federal deputy from Minas Gerais, being elected again with 86,034 votes. As part of the Chamber of Deputies, she is a member of the Education Commission, and is president of the Inclusive Education and Affirmative Action Permanent Subcommittee.

== Electoral history ==
Year	Election	Party	Position	Votes	Result
2020	Uberlândia municipal elections	PT	Councilwoman	5,237 (1.74%)	Elected
2022	2022 Minas Gerais state elections	PT	Federal deputy	86,034 (0.77%)	Elected
