= Cachoeira Dourada, Minas Gerais =

Brazilian municipality

Coordinates: 18°31′S 49°30′W

- Municipality
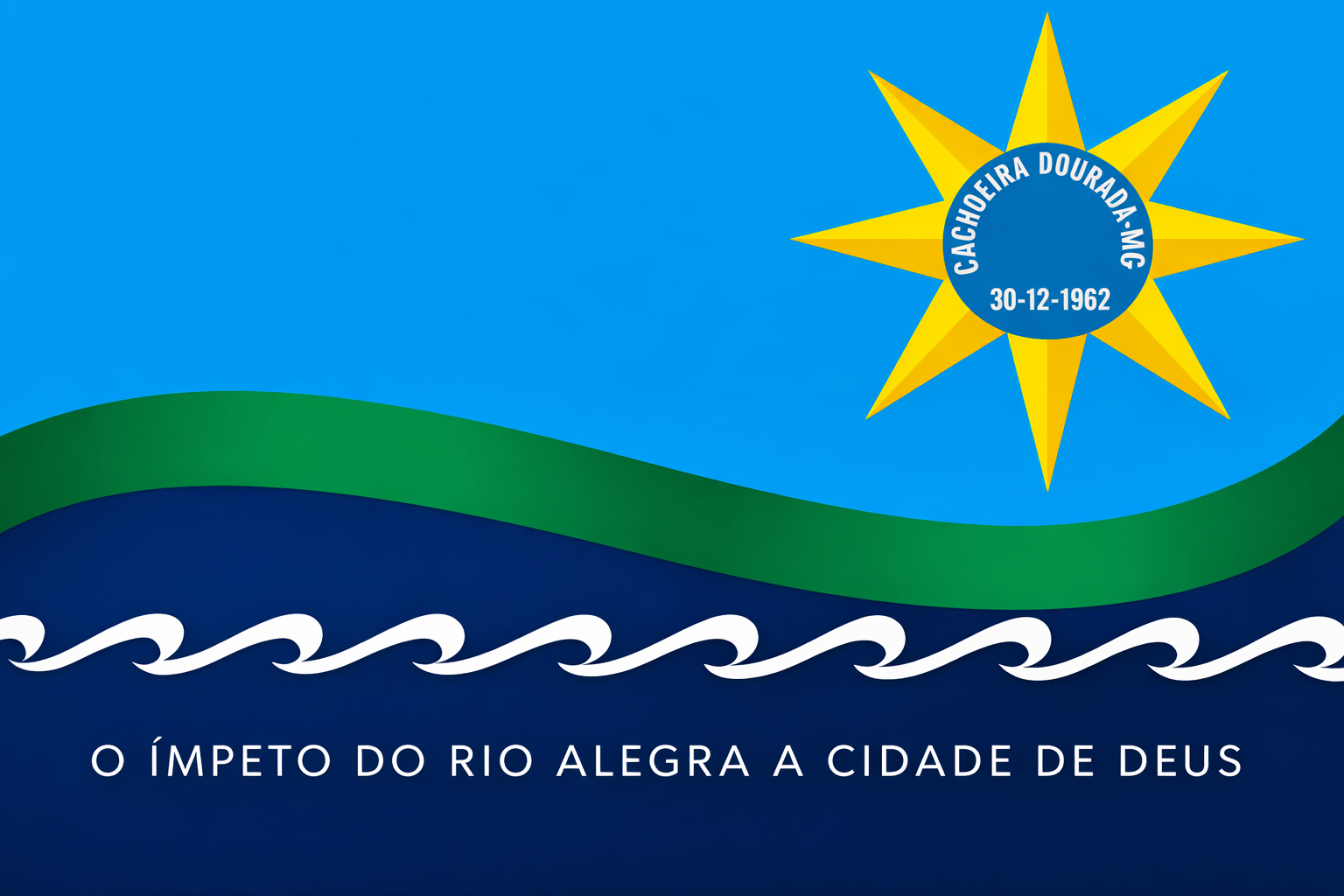
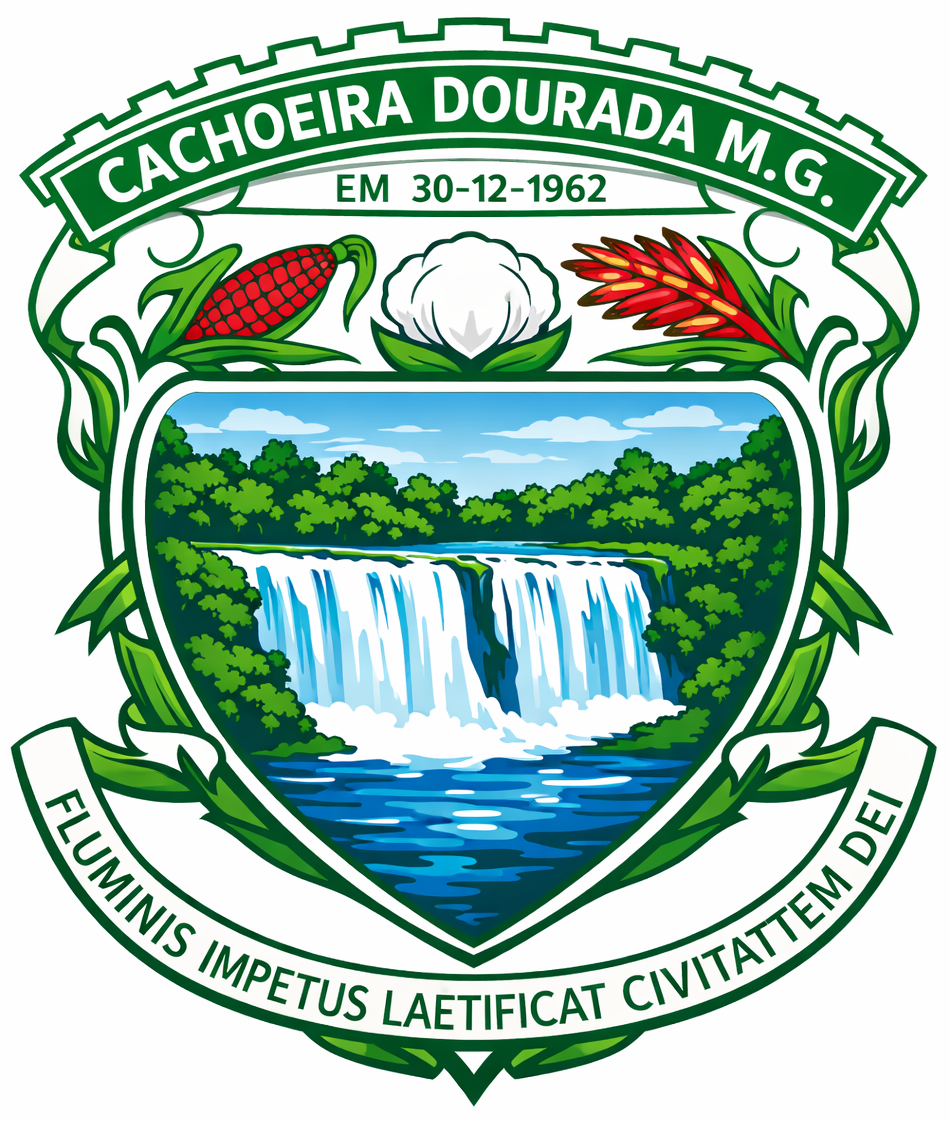
- Flag Coat of arms
- Interactive map of Cachoeira Dourada, Minas Gerais
- Country: Brazil
- State: Minas Gerais
- Region: Southeast
- Time zone: UTC−3 (BRT)

Location of Cachoeira Dourada in the state of Minas Gerais

Cachoeira Dourada is a municipality in the west of the Brazilian state of Minas Gerais. As of 2020 the population was 2,706 in a total area of 202 km^{2}. It became a municipality in 1963, separating from Capinópolis.

== Geography ==
Cachoeira Dourada is located at an elevation of 460 meters on the south bank of the Paranaíba River, just south of the Cachoeira Dourada Hydroelectric Station. Cachoeira Dourada, Goiás, lies a few kilometers to the north on the other side of the dam. It belongs to the statistical microregion of Ituiutaba. Neighboring municipalities are Itumbiara, Capinópolis, and Centralina.

=== Distances ===
- Belo Horizonte: 742 km.
- Capinópolis: 30 km.
- Itumbiara: 31 km.
- Ituiutaba: 66 km.

== Economic activities ==
The most important economic activities are cattle raising, commerce, agriculture and royalties from the hydroelectric station. The GDP in 2005 was R$104,818,000. Cachoeira Dourada is in the top tier of municipalities in the state with regard to economic and social development. It is in a region of good soils, adequate rainfall, and abundance of surface water. As of 2007 there were no banking agencies in the town. There was a small retail commerce serving the surrounding area of cattle and agricultural lands. In the rural area there were 84 establishments employing about 300 workers. Only 30 of the farms had tractors. There were 213 automobiles in all of the municipality. There were 7,000 head of cattle in 2006. The crops with a planted area of more than 100 hectares were sugarcane, soybeans, and corn.

== Health and education ==
In the health sector there were 02 clinics and no hospitals. In the educational sector there was 01 primary school.

- Municipal Human Development Index: 0.753 (2000)
- State ranking: 262 out of 853 municipalities as of 2000
- National ranking: 1,810 out of 5,138 municipalities as of 2000

The highest ranking municipality in Minas Gerais in 2000 was Poços de Caldas with 0.841, while the lowest was Setubinha with 0.568. Nationally the highest was São Caetano do Sul in São Paulo with 0.919, while the lowest was Setubinha. In more recent statistics (considering 5,507 municipalities) Manari in the state of Pernambuco has the lowest rating in the country—0,467—putting it in last place.

== See also ==
- List of municipalities in Minas Gerais
