= Jon M. Sweeney =

American author (born 1967)

Jon M. Sweeney (born July 18, 1967) is an American author. His most frequent subjects are Catholic, particularly St. Francis of Assisi, about whom Sweeney has written The St. Francis Prayer Book, Francis of Assisi in His Own Words, When Saint Francis Saved the Church, The Complete Francis of Assisi, and The Enthusiast.

== Life ==
Jon M. Sweeney converted to Catholicism after spending twenty years as an active Episcopalian, on the feast day of St. Francis of Assisi in Woodstock, Vermont, in 2009. He is married to Michal Woll, a rabbi, and has four children. Sweeney and Woll were profiled in "When a Jew and a Catholic Marry" by Mark Oppenheimer in America (magazine) in August 2017.

== Education ==
While at Moody, Jon M. Sweeney arranged to serve as a summer missionary in Batangas City, Philippines, an experience that he later wrote about in his memoir, Born Again and Again. After finishing at Wheaton, Sweeney was an M.Div. and then an M.A. student at North Park Theological Seminary in Chicago. Eventually, Sweeney left seminary without earning a degree.

== Literary career ==
Sweeney's books about Francis of Assisi have focused on debunking myths that he believes persist from films and novels of the 1960s and 1970s, such as the image of the "hippie" Francis that endures from "Brother Sun, Sister Moon," Franco Zeffirelli's 1972 movie.

Sweeney's projects include a book of short excerpts of the medieval, Dominican Order mystic, Meister Eckhart, retold as blank verse, coauthored with Mark Burrows; and a history of the rift between Bernard of Clairvaux and Peter Abelard in the 12th century, titled The Saint vs. the Scholar.

== Publications ==
- Praying With Our Hands: 21 Practices of Embodied Prayer from the World’s Spiritual Traditions (2000)
- The St. Francis Prayer Book: A Guide to Deepen Your Spiritual Life (2004)
- Born Again and Again: Surprising Gifts of a Fundamentalist Childhood (2005)
- The Lure of Saints: A Protestant Experience of Catholic Tradition (2005)
- Strange Heaven: The Virgin Mary as Mother, Woman, Disciple, and Advocate (2006)
- The St. Clare Prayer Book: Listening for God’s Leading (2007)
- Almost Catholic: An Appreciation of the History, Practice, and Mystery of Ancient Faith (2008)
- Cloister Talks: Learning From My Friends the Monks (2009)
- Beauty Awakening Belief: How the Medieval Worldview Inspires Faith Today (2009)
- Verily, Verily: The KJV – 400 Years of Influence and Beauty (2011)
- Light in the Dark Ages: The Friendship of Francis and Clare of Assisi (2012)
- The Pope Who Quit: A True Medieval Tale of Mystery, Death, and Salvation (2012)
- Mixed-Up Love: Relationships, Family, and Religious Identity in the 21st Century (2013)
- The Age of the Spirit: How the Ghost of an Ancient Controversy Is Shaping the Church (2014) [with Phyllis Tickle]
- Inventing Hell: Dante, the Bible, and Eternal Torment (2014)
- The Complete Francis of Assisi: His Life, The Complete Writings, and The Little Flowers (2015)
- When Saint Francis Saved the Church: How a Converted Medieval Troubadour Created a Spiritual Vision for the Ages (2015)
- The Enthusiast: How the Best Friend of Francis of Assisi Almost Destroyed What He Started (2016)
- The Saint vs. the Scholar: The Fight between Faith and Reason (2017)
- The St. Francis Holy Fool Prayer Book (2017)
- Meister Eckhart’s Book of the Heart: Meditations for the Restless Soul [with Mark S. Burrows] (2017)
- Phyllis Tickle: A Biography (2018)
- The Pope's Cat (for children), illustrated by Roy DeLeon (2018)
- Margaret's Night in St. Peter's: A Christmas Story (for children), illustrated by Roy DeLeon (2018)
- Margaret's First Holy Week (for children), illustrated by Roy DeLeon (2019)
- Meister Eckhart's Book of Secrets [with Mark S. Burrows] (2019)
- St. Francis of Assisi: His Life, Teachings and Practices (2019)
- James Martin, SJ: In the Company of Jesus (2020)
- Margaret and the Pope Go to Assisi (for children), illustrated by Roy DeLeon (2020)
- Nicholas Black Elk: Medicine Man, Catechist, Saint (2021)
- Thomas Merton: An Introduction to his Life, Teachings, and Practices (2021)
- Feed the Wolf: Befriending Our Fears in the Way of Saint Francis (2022)
- Sit in the Sun: And Other Lessons in the Spiritual Wisdom of Cats (2023)
- Meister Eckhart's Book of Darkness and Light [with Mark S. Burrows] (2023)
- My Life in Seventeen Books (2024)
- Experiencing God: 36 Ways According to Saint Francis of Assisi (2026)

As editor

- The Road to Assisi: The Essential Biography of St. Francis – Paul Sabatier (2003)
- Ireland’s Saint: The Essential Biography of St. Patrick – J.B. Bury (2008)
- The Road to Siena: The Essential Biography of St. Catherine – Edmund Garratt Gardner (2009)
- Francis of Assisi in His Own Words: The Essential Writings - Francis of Assisi (2013)
- Three Simple Men: And Other Holy Folktales – Leo Tolstoy (2015)
- Phyllis Tickle: Essential Spiritual Writings - Phyllis Tickle (2015)
- Ralph Waldo Emerson: Essential Spiritual Writings - Ralph Waldo Emerson (2016)
- A Course in Christian Mysticism - Thomas Merton (2017)
- What I Am Living For: Lessons from the Life and Writings of Thomas Merton (2018). Contributors include James Martin, Robert Barron (bishop), Sue Monk Kidd, and Pico Iyer.
- A Course in Desert Spirituality - Thomas Merton (2019)
- Jesus Wasn't Killed by the Jews: Reflections for Christians in Lent (2020) with contributors Amy-Jill Levine, Walter Brueggemann, Massimo Faggioli, and Rabbi Abraham Skorka
