= 9912 Donizetti =

Asteroid

- Orbit of Donizetti (blue) with the inner planets and Jupiter (outermost)

Discovery
- Discovered by: C. J. van Houten; I. van Houten-G. T. Gehrels
- Discovery site: Palomar Obs.
- Discovery date: 16 October 1977

Designations
- Named after: Gaetano Donizetti (Italian composer)
- Alternative designations: 2078 T-3 · 1979 BH_{1} 1989 SJ_{10}
- Minor planet category: main-belt · (middle) · Rafita

Orbital characteristics
- Epoch 4 September 2017 (JD 2458000.5)
- Uncertainty parameter 0
- Observation arc: 39.66 yr (14,486 days)
- Aphelion: 2.9466 AU
- Perihelion: 2.1790 AU
- Semi-major axis: 2.5628 AU
- Eccentricity: 0.1498
- Orbital period (sidereal): 4.10 yr (1,499 days)
- Mean anomaly: 61.175°
- Mean motion: 0° 14^{m} 24.72^{s} / day
- Inclination: 7.2616°
- Longitude of ascending node: 344.18°
- Argument of perihelion: 227.50°

Physical characteristics
- Dimensions: 6.54 km (calculated); 6.922±0.310 km
- Synodic rotation period: 6.228±0.0018 h (R); 6.230±0.0018 h (R)
- Geometric albedo: 0.20 (assumed); 0.255±0.043
- Spectral type: S
- Absolute magnitude (H): 12.838±0.003 (R) · 12.9 · 12.903±0.003 (R) · 13.08±0.35 · 13.29

9912 Donizetti, provisional designation 2078 T-3, is a stony Rafita asteroid from the central regions of the asteroid belt, approximately 7 km in diameter. It was discovered during the third Palomar–Leiden Trojan survey in 1977, and named after Italian composer Gaetano Donizetti.

== Discovery ==
Donizetti was discovered on 16 October 1977, by the Dutch astronomers Ingrid and Cornelis van Houten, on photographic plates taken by Dutch–American astronomer Tom Gehrels at Palomar Observatory in California, United States.

=== Trojan survey ===
The survey designation "T-3" stands for the third and last Palomar–Leiden Trojan survey, named after the fruitful collaboration of the Palomar and Leiden Observatory in the 1960s and 1970s. Gehrels used Palomar's Samuel Oschin telescope (also known as the 48-inch Schmidt Telescope), and shipped the photographic plates to Ingrid and Cornelis van Houten at Leiden Observatory where astrometry was carried out. The trio are credited with the discovery of several thousand asteroids.

== Orbit and classification ==
It orbits the Sun in the central main-belt at a distance of 2.2–2.9 AU once every 4 years and 1 month (1,499 days). Its orbit has an eccentricity of 0.15 and an inclination of 7° with respect to the ecliptic.

The body's observation arc begins at the discovering Palomar Observatory on 7 October 1977, just 9 days prior to its official discovery observation.

=== Rafita family ===
Donizetti is a stony member of the Rafita family, which is located in the central main-belt just beyond the 3:1 mean-motion orbital resonance with Jupiter. The family consists of more than a thousand members, the largest being 1658 Innes and 1587 Kahrstedt, approximately 14 and 15 km in diameter, respectively. The family's namesake, 1644 Rafita, is considered an interloper to the family itself.

== Physical characteristics ==
Donizetti has been characterized as a stony S-type asteroid by Pan-STARRS photometric survey.

=== Rotation period ===
In October 2010, a rotational lightcurve of Donizetti was obtained from photometric observations in the R-band at the Palomar Transient Factory (PTF) in California. Lightcurve analysis gave a rotation period of 6.228 hours with a brightness variation of 0.19 magnitude (U=2).

In December 2011, PTF obtained a second lightcurve, also in the R-band, that gave a concurring period of 6.230 hours and a higher amplitude of 0.32 magnitude.(U=2).

=== Diameter and albedo ===
According to the surveys carried out by the NEOWISE mission of NASA's Wide-field Infrared Survey Explorer, Donizetti measures 6.922 km in diameter and its surface has an albedo of 0.255.

The Collaborative Asteroid Lightcurve Link assumes a standard albedo for stony asteroids of 0.20 and calculates a diameter of 6.54 km based on an absolute magnitude of 13.29.

== Naming ==
This minor planet was named for Italian composer of symphonies, church and chamber music and operas, Gaetano Donizetti (1797–1848). The approved naming citation was published by the Minor Planet Center on 2 April 1999 (M.P.C. 34356).
