= Santa Vitória, Minas Gerais =

Santa Vitória
- Municipality
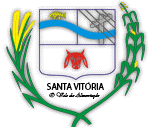
- Coat of arms
- Nickname: O Vale da Alimentação (The Food Valley)
- Interactive map outlining Santa Vitória
- Location within the State of Minas Gerais Location within Brazil Location within South America
- Coordinates: 18°50′20″S 50°7′15″W
- Country: Brazil
- State: Minas Gerais
- Mesoregion: Triângulo Mineiro e Alto Paranaíba
- Microregion: Ituiutaba
- Founded: 31 May 1948

Government
  - Mayor: Isper Salim Curi (MDB)

Area
  - Municipality: 3,021 km^{2} (1,166 sq mi)
- Elevation: 498 m (1,634 ft)

Population (2020)
  - Municipality: 19,872
  - Rank: 1,822nd, Brazil
  - Density: 6.578/km^{2} (17.04/sq mi)
  - Urban: 14,926
- Demonym: santa-vitoriense
- Time zone: UTC−3 (BRT)
- Postal code: 38320-000
- Website: Official website

Santa Vitória is a municipality in the west of the Brazilian state of Minas Gerais. As of 2020, the population was estimated at 19,872. It became a municipality in 1948.

Santa Vitória is located at an elevation of 498 metres (1,634 ft), to the south of the great reservoir of São Simão Dam in the Triângulo Mineiro. It belongs to the statistical microregion of Ituiutaba. Neighboring municipalities are São Simão, União de Minas, Limeira do Oeste, Campina Verde and Gurinhatã.

== History ==
Settlement began in the beginning of the nineteenth century with the cattle ranch called São Jerônimo. The region was occupied by the Caiapó Indians who were dominated and expelled. The region was covered by forests and malaria was endemic. The first church appeared in 1904, followed by the cemetery in 1905. Santa Vitória belonged to the municipality of Ituiutaba, becoming a separate municipality in 1948.

== Economy ==
The most important economic activities are cattle raising, commerce and agriculture. The GDP in 2017 was R$721,332,990.00. Santa Vitória is in the top tier of municipalities in the state with regard to economic and social development. It is in a region of good soils, adequate rainfall, and abundance of surface water. As of 2018 there were three bank branches in the town. There was a small retail commerce serving the surrounding area of cattle and agricultural lands. In the rural area there were 972 establishments giving employment to 4,757 persons. 411 of the farms had tractors. There were 11,079 vehicles throughout the municipality. There were 210,939 head of cattle in 2017. The crops with a planted area of more than 100 hectares (247 acres) were beans, corn, sorghum, soybeans (680 ha (1,680 acres)), and sugarcane.

Cattle production is important with a large herd. Cattle are raised for meat and milk. Eighteen producers are specialized in milk production. In 2006 there were 23,000 dairy cattle. There is also a substantial swine industry.

== Health and education ==
In the health sector there were 21 facilities, one of which is a hospital with 29 beds. In the educational sector there were 11 primary schools and 3 secondary schools.

- Municipal Human Development Index: 0.759 (2000)
- State ranking: 214 out of 853 municipalities as of 2000
- National ranking: 1,604 out of 5,138 municipalities as of 2000

== See also ==
- List of municipalities in Minas Gerais
