= Elpídio Donizetti =

Brazilian jurist (born 1956)

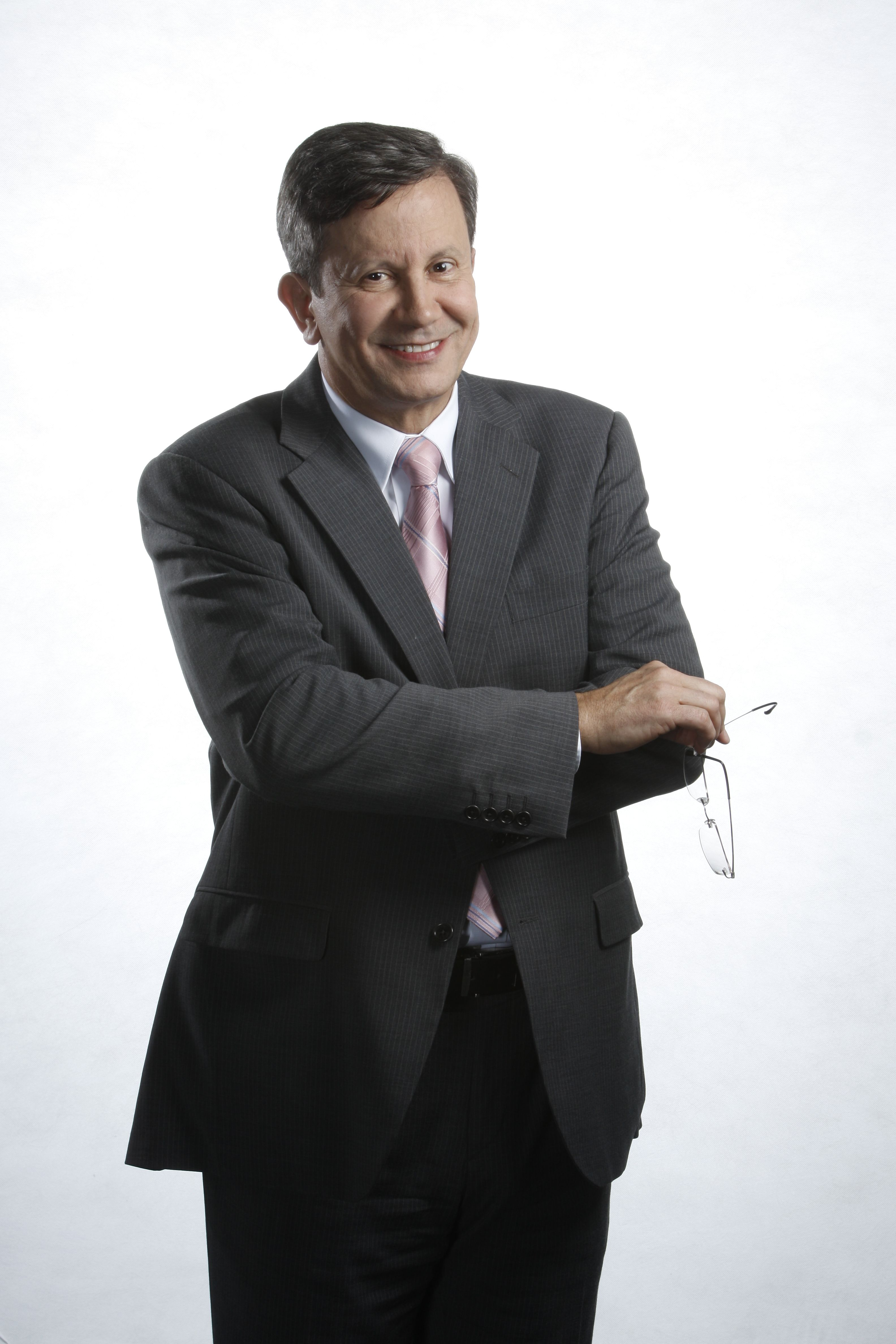
Elpídio Donizetti in 2011

Elpídio Donizetti (born 19 May 1956, in Campina Verde, Minas Gerais) is a Brazilian jurist, professor of private and procedural law, chief judge of the court of appeal of Minas Gerais state, author of various juridical works, and member of various jurist committees responsible for writing new procedural law codes.

== Career ==
Elpídio Donizetti began his career as a math and physics teacher. While working at Banco do Brasil, he began studying law, graduating from the Pontifical Catholic University of Minas Gerais in 1984, where he also obtained a masters in procedural law, in 2002.

Among other positions, he has worked as a prosecutor in Goiás and Minas Gerais states and as a professor at the Federal University of Uberlândia. He has also served as director of the National Association of State Magistrates and as a member of a jurist committee responsible for writing new procedural law codes. In 2005, he was appointed judge at the Court of Justice of Minas Gerais.

== Writing ==
=== Books ===
- Nunes, Elpídio Donizetti. Curso Didático de Direito Processual Civil. São Paulo: Atlas. ISBN 9788522462223.
- Nunes, Elpídio Donizetti; Quintella, Felipe. Curso Didático de Direito Civil. São Paulo: Atlas. ISBN 9788522467921.
- Nunes, Elpídio Donizetti. Redigindo a Sentença Cível. São Paulo: Atlas. ISBN 9788522460670.
- Nunes, Elpídio Donizetti (2010). Ações Constitucionais. São Paulo: Atlas. ISBN 978-8522460632.
- Nunes, Elpídio Donizetti; Malheiros, Marcelo (6 August 2010). Curso de Processo Coletivo. São Paulo: Atlas. ISBN 9788522459964.
- Nunes, Elpídio Donizetti (2010). Processo de Execução. São Paulo: Atlas. ISBN 9788522460472.
- Nunes, Elpídio Donizetti. A última onda reformadora do Código de Processo Civil. Rio de Janeiro: Lumen Juris. ISBN 9788537501894.
- Nunes, Elpídio Donizetti. Para Passar em Concursos Jurídicos. Vol. 3. São Paulo: Método. ISBN 8537503053.

=== Articles ===
- "Embargos à execução para entrega de coisa: prazo e segurança do juízo". Electronic Magazine of Aprobatum Course.
- "Impugnar ou embargar? Os novos meios de oposição pelo devedor ao procedimento executivo introduzidos pela Lei nº. 11.232/2005". Electronic Magazine of Aprobatum Course.
- "Inovações Tecnológicas a serviço do credor aspectos da penhora por meio eletrônico Lei nº. 11382/2006". Dialectic Magazine of Procedural Law, v. 51, p. 51, 2007.
- "Da [em parte] absurda desconsideração da coisa julgada". Juridical Magazine of Laws and Letters, v. 16, p. 16, 2007.
- "Quem é quem no Mandado de Segurança? As figuras do impetrante, impetrado e autoridade coatora". Juridical Magazine of Laws and Letters, v. 4, p. 4, 2007.
- "Penhora On-line: inovações tecnológicas a serviço do credor". Juridical Consultant, v. 1, p. 1, 2007.
- "Liquidar é preciso! Os novos aspectos do procedimento liquidatório à luz da Lei nº. 11.232/2005". Electronic Magazine of Aprobatum Course.
- "Sentença: liquidação, cumprimento, e impugnação. A nova sistemática introduzida pela Lei nº. 11.232/2005". Electronic Magazine of Aprobatum Course.
- "Homem público não tem de aceitar dádivas ou esmolas". Juridical Consultant, v. 1, p. 1, 2006.
- "O umbigo do juiz e a mulher de César". Electronic Magazine of Aprobatum Course.
- "Tempus Regit Actum! Breves considerações acerca do Direito Intertemporal ante a entrada em vigor da Lei nº. 11.232/2005". Electronic Magazine of Aprobatum Course.
- "Informatização da Justiça de 1º Grau:Experiência e Perspectivas". Jurisprudence Magazine, v. 41, p. 41, 1990.
- "Mandado de Segurança e Democracia: Apontamentos sobre o (Des)Cumprimento dos Objetivos do II Pacto Republicano Pela Lei 12.016/09". Temas Atuais de Direito – Studies for Celebration of 80 Years of the Law Course in Espírito Santo Federal University. Rio de Janeiro: Lumen Iuris, p. 165 a 184, 2011.
- "Normas jusfundamentais como limites à autonomia privada e critérios para a aplicação e coordenação – um estudo de caso sobre a inafastabilidade da jurisdição"
- "Mais uma tentativa de golpe contra o federalismo brasileiro – O CNJ quer usurpar poder das corregedorias estaduais"
- "Um consolo para o abandonado: usucapião do lar desfeito"
- "A (In)Observância dos precedentes em recursos repetitivos: automatismo e duplicação dos julgamentos nos tribunais ordinários"
- "A jurisprudência do STJ e a taxa média de mercado: agora os juros ficaram do jeito do que o diabo gosta"
- "Reflexões de um juiz cristão – sobre os meandros da Comissão do Novo CPC"
- "Marcha da Maconha: O Caminhar Plural pela Liberdade"
- "O Preenchimento da Máxima Aristotélica sobre a Igualdade: Study of the 'O conteúdo jurídico do Princípio da Igualdade", of Prof. Celso Antônio Bandeira de Mello"
