= Gurinhatã =

Municipality in the west of the Brazilian state of Minas Gerais

Coordinates: 19°12′S 49°46′W

- Municipality
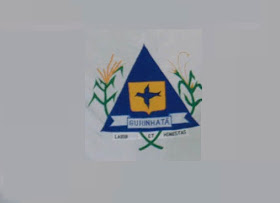
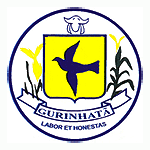
- Flag Coat of arms
- Interactive map of Gurinhatã
- Country: Brazil
- State: Minas Gerais
- Region: Southeast
- Time zone: UTC−3 (BRT)

Location of Gurinhatã in the state of Minas Gerais

Gurinhatã is a municipality in the west of the Brazilian state of Minas Gerais. As of 2020 the population was 5,577 in a total area of 1,844 km^{2}. It became a municipality in 1962.

== Geography ==
Gurinhatã is located at an elevation of 543 meters. It belongs to the statistical microregion of Ituiutaba. Neighboring municipalities are Santa Vitória, Iturama, Ipiaçu e Ituiutaba

=== Distances ===
- Belo Horizonte: 722 km.
- Flor de Minas: 42 km.
- Uberlândia: 210 km.
- Ituiutaba: 63 km.

== Economic activities ==
The most important economic activities are cattle raising, commerce, and agriculture. The GDP in 2005 was R$72,537,000. Gurinhatã is in the top tier of municipalities in the state with regard to economic and social development. It is in a region of good soils, adequate rainfall, and abundance of surface water. As of 2007 there was 1 banking agency in the town. There was a small retail commerce serving the surrounding area of cattle and agricultural lands. In the rural area there were 1,014 establishments employing about 2,900 workers. 331 of the farms had tractors. There were 567 automobiles in all of the municipality. There were 148,000 head of cattle in 2006. The crops with a planted area of more than 100 hectares were rice, sugarcane, soybeans, and corn.

== Health and education ==
In the health sector there were eight clinics and one hospital with 27 beds. In the educational sector there were five primary schools and two middle schools.

- Municipal Human Development Index: 0.758 (2000)
- State ranking: 230 out of 853 municipalities as of 2000
- National ranking: 1,657 out of 5,138 municipalities as of 2000

The highest ranking municipality in Minas Gerais in 2000 was Poços de Caldas with 0.841, while the lowest was Setubinha with 0.568. Nationally the highest was São Caetano do Sul in São Paulo with 0.919, while the lowest was Setubinha. In more recent statistics (considering 5,507 municipalities) Manari in the state of Pernambuco has the lowest rating in the country—0,467—putting it in last place.

== See also ==
- List of municipalities in Minas Gerais
