= Campina Verde =

Municipality in Minas Gerais, Brazil

- Municipality
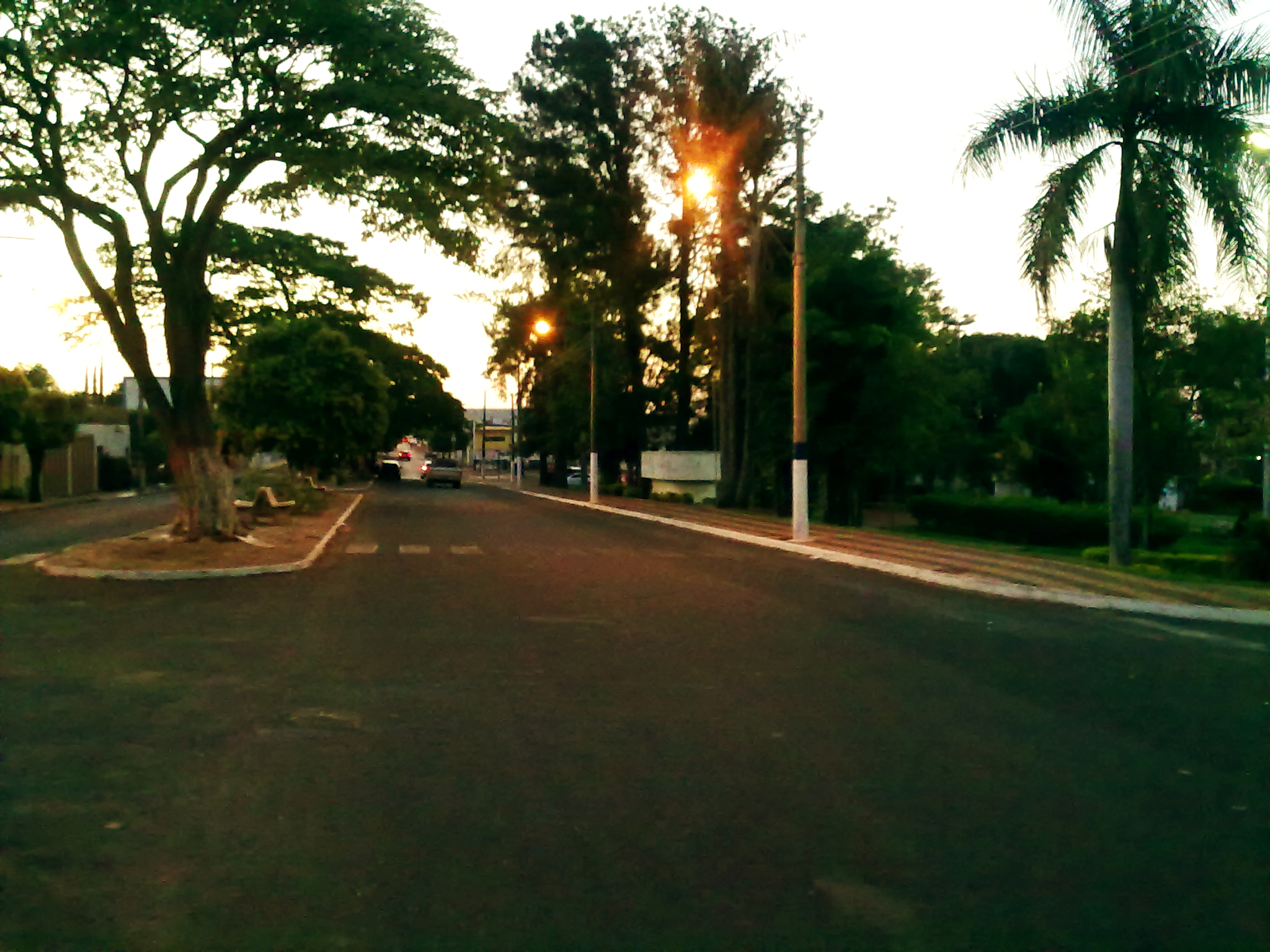
- Praça Francisco Barcelos

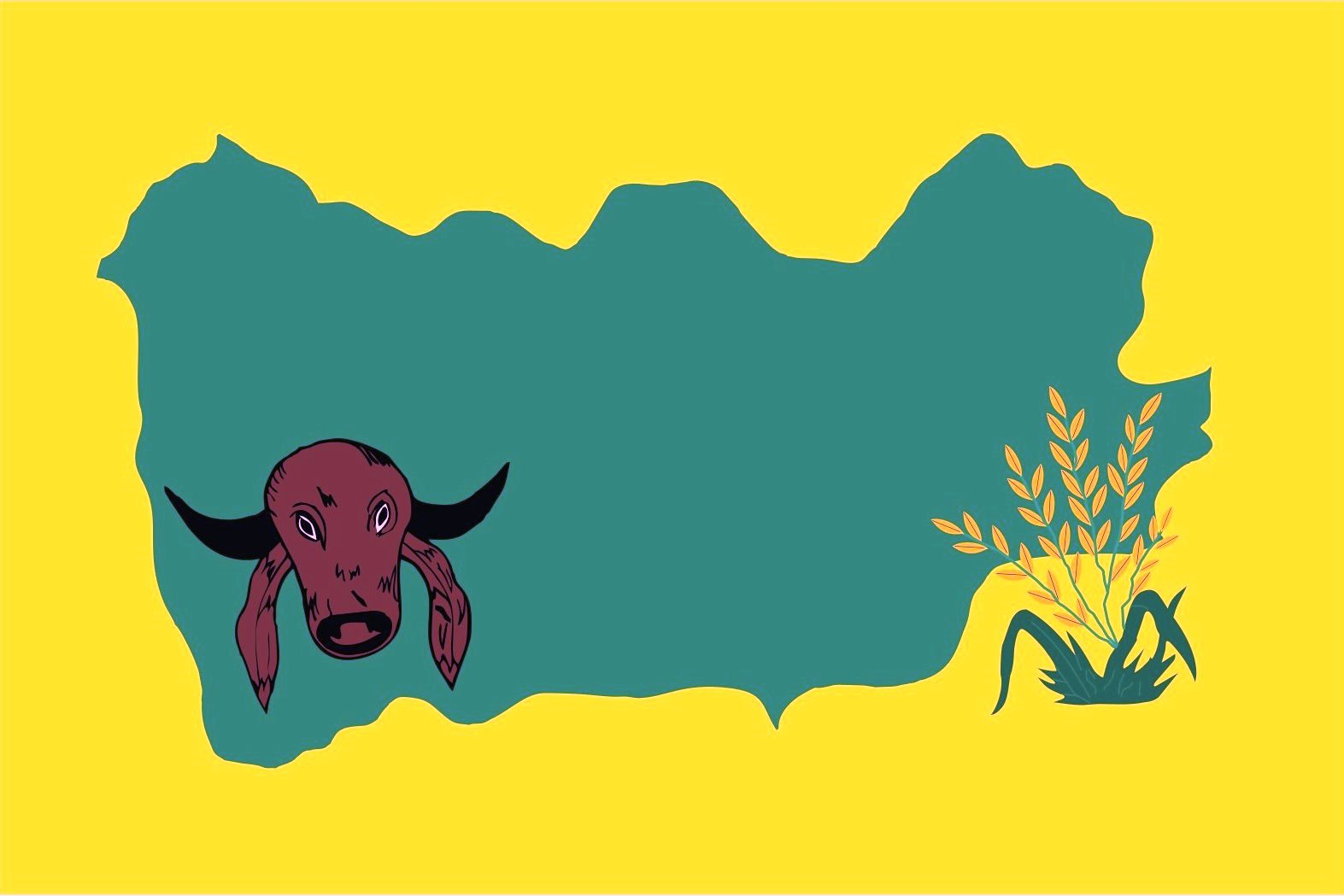
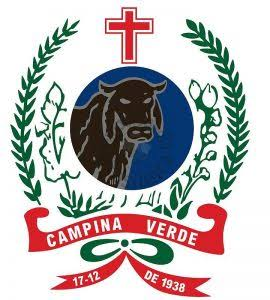
- Flag Coat of arms

- Location in Minas Gerais

- Location in Brazil
- Coordinates: 19°32′09″S 49°29′09″W
- Country: Brazil
- Region: Southeast
- State: Minas Gerais
- Intermediate region: Uberlândia
- Immediate region: Uberlândia
- Municipality created: 17 December 1938
- Districts: Campina Verde, Honorópolis

Government
  - Mayor: Helder Paulo Carneiro (Solidarity)
  - Term: 2025–2028

Area
  - Total: 3,650.749 km^{2} (1,409.562 sq mi)

Population (2022)
  - Total: 18,011
  - Estimate (2025): 18,188
  - Density: 4.9335/km^{2} (12.778/sq mi)
- Demonym: campina-verdense

Socioeconomic indicators
  - HDI (2010): 0.704
  - GDP per capita (2023): R$37,625.23
- Time zone: UTC−3 (BRT)
- Postal code: 38270-000
- Area code: 34
- Website: campinaverde.mg.gov.br

Campina Verde is a municipality in the Triângulo Mineiro of western Minas Gerais, Brazil. It belongs to the Immediate Geographic Region of Uberlândia and the Intermediate Geographic Region of Uberlândia. The municipality covers 3,650.749 km^{2} (1,409.562 sq mi). Its population was 18,011 in the 2022 census and was estimated at 18,188 in 2025.

The municipality was created on 17 December 1938. It consists of the districts of Campina Verde and Honorópolis. Its waterways drain toward the lower Grande River and the lower Paranaíba River.

== History ==
In 1830, João Batista Siqueira and his wife donated the Campo Belo, Perobas, and Fortaleza farms to the Congregation of the Mission. The congregation established a house at Campo Belo. Houses gathered near its church and formed the settlement that became Campina Verde.

The district of Rio Verde had its seat transferred from Monjolinho to Campo Belo in 1911. It was renamed Campina Verde on 7 September 1923 and remained part of Prata.

State Decree-Law No. 148 created the municipality on 17 December 1938. It joined the Campina Verde district, detached from Prata, with São Francisco de Sales, detached from Frutal, and the newly created district of Santa Rosa.

Santa Rosa was renamed Camélia in 1943 and became the municipality of Iturama in 1948. São Francisco de Sales separated from Campina Verde in 1962. The same law created Honorópolis as a district of Campina Verde.

== Geography ==
Campina Verde covers 3,650.749 km^{2} (1,409.562 sq mi) in western Minas Gerais. The municipality is divided into the districts of Campina Verde and Honorópolis. Its municipal seat lies near the center of the territory, while Honorópolis occupies its own district farther west.

Campina Verde spans two parts of the Paraná River basin. Some waterways drain toward the lower Grande River, while others flow toward the lower Paranaíba River.

== Notable people ==
- Elpídio Donizetti, jurist

== See also ==
- List of municipalities in Minas Gerais
