= Canápolis =

Town and municipality in the state of Minas Gerais, Brazil

Coordinates: 18°43′30″S 49°12′14″W

- Municipality
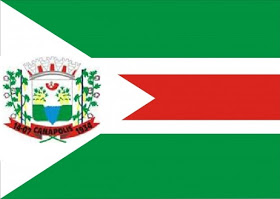
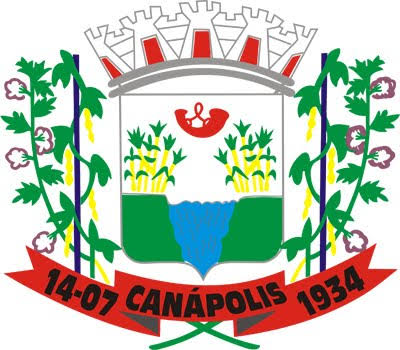
- Flag Coat of arms
- Interactive map of Canápolis
- Country: Brazil
- State: Minas Gerais
- Region: Southeast
- Time zone: UTC−3 (BRT)

Location of Canápolis in the state of Minas Gerais

Canápolis is a Brazilian municipality located in the west of the state of Minas Gerais. Its population as of 2020 was 12,201 living in a total area of 845 km^{2} (326 sq mi). The city belongs to the statistical mesoregion of Triângulo Mineiro and Alto Paranaíba and to the statistical microregion of Uberlândia. It became a municipality in 1948.

== Geography ==
Canápolis is located at an elevation of 662 meters (municipal seat) in the north of the rich region known as the Triângulo Mineiro. It is east of the Paranaíba River and south of the great hydroelectric station and reservoir of Itumbiara. Federal highway BR-153, which links Uberlândia with Goiânia passes at 17 kilometers east of the town.

The distance to Uberlândia is 130 km; the distance to Itumbiara is 60 km; and the distance to Belo Horizonte is 655 km. Neighboring municipalities are: Centralina (N); Capinópolis (W); Ituiutaba (S); Monte Alegre de Minas (E)

== Economy ==
The main economic activities are industry, services, and agriculture, especially the growing of pineapple and sugarcane. The GDP in 2005 was R$168,000.00, with 49,000.00 from services, 34,000.00 from industry, and 74,000.00 from agriculture. There were 275 rural producers on 50,000 hectares of land. 133 farms had tractors. The main crops were pineapple, bananas, sugarcane, soybeans, and corn. There were 42,000 head of cattle (2006).

== History ==
In 1934, José de Paula Gouveia donated 5 hectares (12 acres) of land from Fazenda Córrego do Cerrado to found a new district in Monte Alegre de Minas. The region had fertile land, which attracted residents and promoted remarkable development. The subdivision and sale of areas around the town attracted many outsiders, boosting the local economy. In 1938, the population nucleus was elevated to the category of district, receiving the name of Canápolis, due to the sugar cane plantations. In 1948, Canápolis gained administrative independence and became a new municipality, along with the district of Centralina, which today is also independent.

== Demographics ==
In 2021, it is estimated that the population of the municipality is about 12,251 people.

== Religion ==
In 2010, the population consisted of approximately 8,501 Catholics, 1,441 Evangelicals, and 393 Spiritualists.

== Education ==
In 2010, the enrollment rate for children aged 6 to 14 years was 99%.

In 2021, the municipality obtained a score of 6.2 on the Índice de Desenvolvimento da Educação Básica or Basic Education Development Index (IDEB). For the final years of elementary school, IDEB recorded a score of 4.7 for the city's public network.

The municipality has seven elementary schools and one high school, and has 77 teachers in elementary education and 25 teachers in high school. In 2021, 1,192 enrollments were registered in primary education and 290 enrollments in secondary education.

== Municipal social indicators ==
The social indicators rank it in the top tier of municipalities in the state.

- Municipal Human Development Index: 0.755 (2000)
- State ranking: 248 out of 853 municipalities as of 2000
- National ranking: 1,728 out of 5,138 municipalities as of 2000
- Literacy rate: 85%
- Life expectancy: 72 (average of males and females)

The highest ranking municipality in Minas Gerais in 2000 was Poços de Caldas with 0.841, while the lowest was Setubinha with 0.568. Nationally the highest was São Caetano do Sul in São Paulo with 0.919, while the lowest was Setubinha. In more recent statistics (considering 5,507 municipalities) Manari in the state of Pernambuco has the lowest rating in the country—0,467—putting it in last place.

== See also ==
- List of municipalities in Minas Gerais
