= Mario Donizetti =

Italian painter (born 1932)

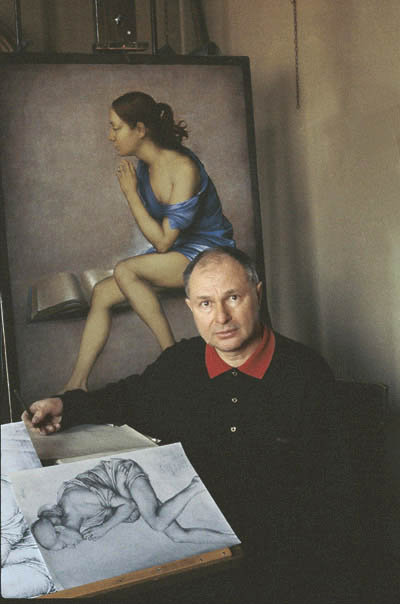
Mario Donizetti while painting

Mario Donizetti (23 January 1932) is an Italian painter and essayist from Bergamo, Lombardy.

== Biography ==
Scientific technical researches have led Donizetti to use innovative techniques for his works such as varnished and glazed egg-yolk tempera as well as his personal encausto and his "encaustic pastel".

In 1977 Donizetti founded the Centre for Research Techniques of Arts and in 2003 the "Donizetti School-Museum" online. Donizetti also contributes to newspapers and magazines with essays on aesthetics and diagnosis of restoration.

In 1983 an anthological exhibition of his work was held in the halls of the Biblioteca Ambrosiana in Milan.

== Works ==
Donizetti's notable works include the "Crucifix" in The Treasury Museum of the Vatican Basilica; the frescos and the altar piece in the historical Basilica in Pontida; the portrait of Pope John Paul II (now part of the National Portrait Gallery (United States) collection in Washington, D.C.) and published on the covers of Time (magazine); "Commedia dell'Arte" in the "Spajani Raccolta" GAMEC in Bergamo; and "La Carità" in the "Margherita Cassis Faraone Collection".

== Exhibitions ==
- "Premio Suzzara" 1951 and 1952
- "Mostra Arte Sacra" 1952
- "Premio Michetti" 1953
- "Nazionale Arte Sacra-Bologna" 1954
- One man show – Galleria Ranzini – via Brera Milano 1955
- "II Quadriennale di Roma" 1955
- "Biennale Arte Sacra Angelicum" 1957
- One Man Show – Galleria Ranzini – via Brera Milano 1958
- "Biennale Angelicum" 1959
- One Man Show - La Bussola, Genova 1960
- "The Picture and the Painter" Trafalgar Galleries London 1960
- "Biennale Arte Sacra Angelicum" 1961
- "Museo della Scienza e della Tecnica" 1962
- "Museo Teatrale alla Scala" 1963
- "Palazzo della Permanente" Milano 1964
- "Palazzo Reale" Milano 1966
- "The Royal Academy Summer Exhibition" London 1966
- "Palazzo della Permanente" 1967
- "Padiglione d'Arte Contemporanea" Milano 1969
- One Man Show Galleria Quaglino Torino 1970
- One Man Show Galleria Pirra Torino 1973
- One Man Show J.H.Bauer Galerie Hannover 1974
- One Man Show Leitheimer Schloss Museum Mùnchen 1974
- "Anthological Exhibition" Ambrosiana Museum 1983-84
- "Museo del Patriarcato" Aquileia 1995
- "Palazzo Sormani" Milano 1995
- "The Seven Deadly Seens" Palazzo della Ragione BG 1999
- "Raccolta Spajani" GAMEC BG 1999
- "75° TIME Smithsonian Institution" Washington 2000
- "75° TIME National Academic Museum" New York 2000
- One man show Galleria Schreiber Brescia 2000
- One man show Galleria Arsmedia Bergamo 2002
- "Quadrato per la Ricerca" GAMEC BG 2005
- "Donizetti Designer" Galleria Arsmedia 2003
- One man show Galleria Cappelletti – via Brera Milano 2007
- One man show Radici-Casa Bergamo 2008
- Mostra personale dal 9 aprile al 30 giugno 2011 – CASTELLO di ORZINUOVI
- 54° BIENNALE – 2011 – ARSENALE VENEZIA
- MOSTRA PALAZZO GRIMANI – VITTORIO SGARBI: "l'ombra del sacro nell'arte contemporanea" – VENEZIA 2011

== Essays ==
- "Form and no Form" 1958 Ranzini
- "Why Figurative" 1992 Corponove Ed.
- "Rationality of Faith and of Beauty" 1995 Corponove Ed.
- "Letter to Pemenides" 1996 Corponove Ed.
- "Letter to Plato" 1997 Corponove Ed.
- "Why Figurative" 1997 II° Edition ART'E'
- "Aesthetic Arguments" 1999 Corponove Ed.
- "Letter to Hegel" 2000 Corponove Ed.
- "Lessons on Art Technique" 2005 Corponove Ed.
- "Bocconi d'Arte" 2006 ESI Edizioni Scientifiche Italiane
- "Letter to Phyllis" 2007 Corponove Ed.
- "IL SACRO DELL'ARTE – LETTERA AGLI ARTISTI" – ED. CORPONOVE 2011
- "QUESTO RAFFAELLO NON SI DEVE RESTAURARE" – ECO DI BERGAMO 2O LUGLIO 2012
- "DIPINTO NON RITOCCATO LA SUA VERNICE E'AUTENTICA" – CORRIERE DELLA SERA 8 giugno 2013
- "L'ILLUSIONE DI KANT E IL RITORNO AI VALORI DEI SENSI" – CORRIERE DELLA SERA 16 gennaio 2014

== Mario Donizetti in museums ==
- NATIONAL PORTRAIT GALLERY – SMITHSONIAN INSTITUTION – WASHINGTON
- MUSEO TESORO BASILICA SAN PIETRO IN VATICANO
- MUSEO STORICA BASILICA PONTIDA
- CIVICO MUSEO DI UDINE
- MUSEO TEATRALE ALLA SCALA MILANO
- GAMEC – GALLERIA DI ARTE MODERNA E CONTEMPORANEA BERGAMO

== Bibliography ==
- Piva "Manuale" HOEPLI 1950
- V.Costantini "Corriere Lombardo" 1952
- Carlo Melis "Settimo Giorno" 1955
- Gian Paolo "Domenica del Corriere" 1957
- Dino Villani "Gazzetta di Mantova" 1959
- Marziano Bernardi "La Stampa" Turin 1960
- John McKenzie "Art News and Review" London 1960
- Carlo Visconti "Settimo Giorno" 1963
- "Monografia" Edizioni Bolis 1967
- "Incontri d'arte" Edizioni Quaglino 1970
- E.Fabiani "Dipinti e Disegni" Ed. Il Conventino 1972
- Enciclopedia Internazionale – Curcio Groellier Roma 1972
- A.F. von Tucher Ed. Leitheimer Schloss Galerie Munchen 1974
- "Mario Donizetti" Ed. Jehn Heiner Bauer Hannover 1974
- "Altmeisterlisches im Tempera" Hannoversche Allgemeine 1974
- "Die Klassische Ordnung" Neue Hannoversche Presse 1974
- Renzo Biasion OGGI n.14 1976
- "Dictionary of International Biography" Cambridge 1976
- C.M.Pensa EPOCA 1977
- Rossana Bossaglia "Fiori e Animali" Ed. Grafica e Arte 1981
- Alessio Andreucci "Visioni". Ed. Vannini 1981
- "Ritratto di Diana Spencer" Time (magazine) (cover) New York 1981
- "International Who's Who of Intellectuals" Cambridge 1982
- "Marquis Who's Who in the World" Illinois USA 1982-83
- A.Paredi "Donizetti all'Ambrosiana" Ed. FONTES AMBROSIANI 1983
- J.Louis Ferrier Le Point Paris 1983
- "Ritratto di Indira Gandhi" Time (magazine) (cover) New York 1984
- Przekroy-Krakowskie n.2016 Varsavia 1984
- "The International Who's Who" England 1984
- Jean Louis Ferrier "La petit form" Ed. Denoel Paris 1985
- "Ritratto di papa Giovanni Paolo II" Time (magazine) (cover) 1985
- "Marquis Who's Who in the World" Illinois USA 1986/7
- "Biography International" New Delhi India 1987/8
- Nicoletta Cobolli- Gigli ARTE 1988
- J.L.Ferrier R.De Grada "Monografia" Ed. Bolis 1989
- Vittorio Feltri Corriere della Sera 1989
- Monika von Zitzewitz DIE WELT 1989
- Alessandra Quattordio ARTE 1990
- M.Pizzorni "Collection Works by the Great Masters Salvador Dalì, Pietro Annigoni, Mario Donizetti" 1991
- Elsa Klensch "Donizetti" Style CNN International New York 1992
- Costanza Andreucci "L'Arte fra il Caso e la Tecnica" L'Indipendente 1993
- Paolo Levi Bell'Italia n.18 aprile 1993
- Michele Andreucci "La rivoluzione del pastello" IL GIORNO 18 nov. 1994
- "Dossier Ritratti" Il VENERDI' di Repubblica 1994
- Francesca Bonazzoli ViviMilano del Corriere della Sera 27 dic.1995
- Jean Louis Ferrier - S. Milesi – Monografia SILVANA EDITORIALE 1996
- "EUROPE 50-Golden Anniversari Issue" Time (magazine) winter 1996
- R.Farina "La verità dei sensi" Il Giornale 24 luglio 1996
- Francesca Pini SETTE del Corriere della Sera n.46 nov.1996
- R.mo Capitolo di san Pietro in Vaticano: Il Crocifisso di Mario Donizetti nel MUSEO TESORO della Basilica – Roma 1996
- Ritratto di Den Xiaoping Time (magazine) (cover) 3 marzo 1997
- Lorenzo Vincenti OGGI 1997
- Ermanno Krumm Corriere della Sera 3 dic. 1997
- F.S.Voss – "FACES of TIME, 75 years of Time (magazine) cover portraits" - Brown & company Boston New York Toronto London 1998
- "ART and History" TIME 75° Anniversary New York 1998
- NEUE KRONEN ZEITUNG "Der Gekreuzigte von Mario Donizetti" (cover) – Wien, Salzburg, Insbruch, Linz, Gratz, Klagenfurt 1998
- S. Milesi - Vittorino Andreoli "I Vizi Capitali" Corponove Ed. 1998
- Vittorio Fagone "Raccolta SPAJANI" Ed. Lubrina 1999
- Flaminio Guardoni CORRIERE della SERA sett. 1999
- Vittorio Sgarbi OGGI sett. 1999
- RAI 3 TG3 18 sett. 1999
- Armando Besio LA REPUBBLICA 13 ott. 1999
- Diana De Feo RAI 1 TG1 26 ott. 1999
- Time (magazine) "Fascicolo del millennio", dicembre 1999
- "L'Arte tornerà Arte" (I grandi avvenimenti del 900, fascicolo n. 9)
- Corriere della Sera 2 febbraio 2000
- Mauro Gaffurri "L'Arcimboldo" RAI 3 TV Sette del Corriere della Sera 2 giugno 2001
- Pia Capelli LIBERO 2 marzo 2002
- Cesare Zapperi Corriere della Sera 17 marzo 2002
- Vittorio Sgarbi OGGI 20 marzo 2002
- Carlo Castellaneta DIZIONARIO della PITTURA ITALIANA 7 genn.2003
- Phyllis Tickle GREED - OXFORD UNIVERSITY PRESS March 2003
- "Marquis Who's Who in the World" Illinois USA 2003
- ENCICLOPEDIA RIZZOLI LAROUSSE 2003
- F. Pini "Eva. The Passion secondo Donizetti" MAGAZINE Corriere della Sera n. 4 del 3 giugno 2004
- "Marquis Who'sWho in the World" Illinois 2004
- V. Sgarbi - S. Casanova "La tempera all'uovo di Donizetti"- OGGI, n. 21 2005
- ENCICLOPEDIA TEMATICA – Nuova Enciclopedia Universale Rizzoli Larousse ARTE 2005
- "Marquis WHO'S WHO" in the WORLD 2005 - 2006
- "WHO'S WHO in ITALY" Sutter's International Red Series 2007
- MARQUIS "Who's Who in the WORLD" Illinois USA
- "WHO'S WHO in ITALY" Sutter's International Golden Edition 2008
- "Who's Who in the World" ILLINOIS USA 2008
- Roberta Scorranese "La modella ideale" CORRIERE della SERA 2008
- "Marquis WHO'S WHO" in the WORLD 2009
- "Marquis WHO'S WHO" in AMERICA 2009
- NATIONAL PORTRAIT GALLERY – SMITHSONIAN INSTITUTION – WASHINGTON
- MUSEO TESORO BASILICA SAN PIETRO IN VATICANO
- MUSEO STORICA BASILICA PONTIDA
- CIVICO MUSEO DI UDINE
- MUSEO TEATRALE ALLA SCALA MILANO
- GAMEC – GALLERIA DI ARTE MODERNA E CONTEMPORANEA BERGAMO
