= Phyllis Tickle =

American author and lecturer

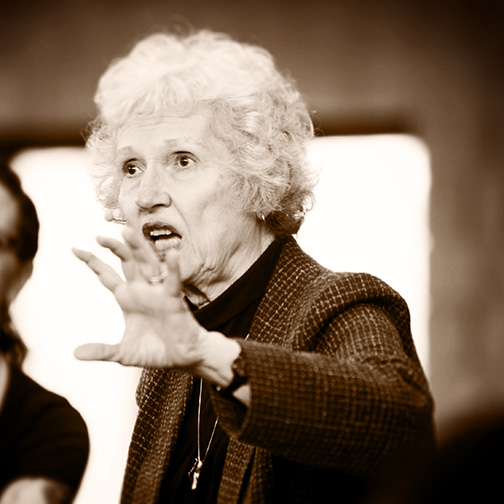
- Born: Phyllis Natalie Alexander; March 12, 1934; Johnson City, Tennessee, U.S.
- Died: September 22, 2015 (aged 81); Millington, Tennessee, U.S.
- Occupations: Author, lecturer
- Years active: 1972–2015
- Spouse(s): Samuel Tickle, Sr. (m. 1955)
- Children: Seven

Phyllis Natalie Tickle (née Alexander; March 12, 1934 – September 22, 2015) was an American author and lecturer whose work focuses on spirituality and religion issues. After serving as a teacher, professor, and academic dean, Tickle entered the publishing industry, serving as the founding editor of the religion department at Publishers Weekly, before then becoming a popular writer. She is well known as a leading voice in the emergence church movement. She is perhaps best known for The Divine Hours series of books, published by Doubleday Press, and her book The Great Emergence- How Christianity Is Changing and Why. Tickle was a member of the Episcopal Church, where she was licensed as both a lector and a lay eucharistic minister. She has been widely quoted by many media outlets, including Newsweek, Time, Life, The New York Times, USA Today, CNN, C-SPAN, PBS, The History Channel, the BBC and VOA. It has been said that "Over the past generation, no one has written more deeply and spoken more widely about the contours of American faith and spirituality than Phyllis Tickle."

== Personal life ==
Phyllis Tickle was born on March 12, 1934, to Philip Wade Alexander, dean of East Tennessee State University, and Katherine Ann Porter Alexander. On June 17, 1955, she married Samuel Milton Tickle Sr., a prominent pulmonologist, who died in January 2015 after a long illness. The couple had seven children, and Tickle continued to make her home near Millington, Tennessee, on The Farm in Lucy, where many of Tickle's stories are set.

Tickle died on September 22, 2015, months after being diagnosed with lung cancer. She was 81.

== Education ==
Tickle studied for three years at Shorter University and received her BA from East Tennessee State University in 1955. She was appointed Fellow of the University by Furman University, receiving an MA degree from that institution in 1961.

Berkeley Divinity School at Yale University awarded her the honorary degree of Doctor of Humane Letters in 2004; and she received a second such degree from North Park University in 2009.

== Career ==
She began her career as a Latin teacher in the Memphis public schools (1955–1957). Tickle then taught at Furman University (1960–1962) and Rhodes College (1962–1965), before being appointed Dean of Humanities at the Memphis College of Art (1965–1971).

In 1972 Tickle transitioned from teaching to writing and editing. She worked as the managing editor (1975–1982) and senior editor (1982–1987) for St. Luke's Press, then the senior editor for Peachtree Publishers (1987–1989). She was the Director of the Trade Publishing Group for the Wimmer Companies from 1987 until 1990. In 1991, Tickle launched PW's religion department, as "religion publishing was becoming a force to be reckoned with" and she remained with the magazine until 2004, when she resigned in order to devote more time to her work with Emergence thought in general, and Emergence Christianity in particular. During her tenure at Publishers Weekly, Tickle was famous for such bon mots as referring to religion books as "portable pastors". and for what USA Today referred to as her "rigorous mind and hand-in-the dirt humility." She saw religion book publishing as both a vocation and fiscal responsibility, frequently remarking that, "A hot market (in religion books) requires a golden heart and black hands;" and speaking both nationally and internationally on the burgeoning sales of religion books, she was in demand by print and broadcast media.

Tickle served as Fellow of the Cathedral College at the National Cathedral in Washington for three years prior to its closing in 2009. She was founding president of the Publishers Association of the South in 1984-85 and was re-elected for an additional term in 1985–86. In 1996, she received the publishing industry's Mays Award in recognition of lifetime achievement in writing and in publishing, and specifically in recognition of her work in gaining mainstream media coverage of religion publishing. In 2007, she was the recipient of the prestigious Life-Time Achievement Award from The Christy Awards "...in gratitude for a lifetime as an advocate for fiction written to the glory of God." She also served on a number of advisory and corporate boards. Tickle's papers are archived at the Livingston Library at Shorter University.

From 2004 to her retirement from public life in 2015, Tickle focused on writing and lecturing. The author of over three dozen books, she became a leading expert on, and student of, the emergence church movement, while continuing to maintain her interest in the religion book publishing industry; and it has been said of her that she is to religious publishing what Walter Cronkite is to journalism."

In 2007, in honor of their friendship and in recognition of Tickle's on-going interest in the interface between religion and the rapidly expanding neuro-science of the 21st century, the Italian painter, Mario Donizetti, a leading figure in contemporary realism, published "Lettera a Phyllis", to honor their friendship by presenting some of his more recent theories of aesthetics and argues the groundlessness, for him, of artistic informalism, in view of the most recent discoveries about the human brain.

In 2013 and in honor of retirement from public life, Tony Jones edited a book that contains a series of essays in tribute to Tickle; contributors include Brian McLaren, Doug Pagitt, Jon M. Sweeney, Lauren Winner, and Diana Butler Bass.

In June 2015, as part of its "Modern Spiritual Masters Series," Orbis Books released a compendium of Tickle's writings: "Phyllis Tickle—Essential Spiritual Writings".

In July 2015, the Wild Goose Festival was dedicated to her honor. The Festival's web page cited her as a major contributor to the festival's success, saying, "Her enthusiasm and affirmations of this journey have called so many of us together." The Festival's coordinators announced that they would be "incorporating prayers from the pocket edition of The Divine Hours prayer book into the schedule of the festival" as a response to the announcement that Tickle was diagnosed with Stage IV lung cancer.

In fall 2015, Logos Bookstores, the largest nationwide association of Christian book sellers, declared Tickle as their author of the year 2015.

== Bibliography ==
- The Age of the Spirit - How the Ghost of an Ancient Controversy is Shaping the Church, written with Jon M. Sweeney (Baker Books, 2013)
- Emergence Christianity – What It Is, Where It Is Going, and Why It Matters (Baker Books, 2012)
- Embracing Emergence Christianity (with Tim Scorer) – Six-Session DVD (Church Publishing, 2011)
- The Doorway (Liturgical Drama, first production, 2010)
- The Great Emergence – How Christianity is Changing and Why (Baker Books, 2008)
- The Words of Jesus – A Gospel of the Sayings of Our Lord with Reflections (Jossey-Bass, 2008)
- The "Seven Ancient Practices" Series, General Editor (Thomas Nelson, 2008)
- This Is What I Pray Today – The Divine Hours for Children (Dutton for Young Readers, 2007)
- The Pocket Edition of – The Divine Hours (Oxford University Press, 2007)
- The Night Office – Prayers for the Hours from Sunset to Sunrise (Oxford University Press, 2006)
- Prayer Is A Place – America's Religious Landscape Observed (Doubleday, 2005)
- Greed (Oxford University Press, 2004)
- The Graces We Remember (Loyola Press, 2004)
- Wisdom in the Waiting (Loyola Press, 2004)
- Eastertide – Prayers for Lent and Easter from The Divine Hours (Doubleday, 2004)
- What the Land Already Knows (Loyola Press, 2003)
- Christmastide – Prayers for Advent through Epiphany from The Divine Hours (Doubleday, 2003)
- A Stitch and A Prayer (Paraclete Press, 2003)
- The Divine Hours: Prayers for Springtime (Doubleday, 2003)
- The Shaping of A Life – A Spiritual Landscape (Doubleday, 2001)
- The Divine Hours: Prayers for Autumn and Wintertime (Doubleday, 2000)
- The Divine Hours: Prayers for Summertime (Doubleday, 2000)
- God-Talk In America (Crossroad, 1997)
- HomeWorks, General Editor (University of Tennessee Press, 1996)
- My Father's Prayer: A Remembrance (Upper Room Books, 1995)
- Re-Discovering the Sacred: Spirituality in America (Crossroads, 1995)
- Confessing Conscience: Churched Women on Abortion, General Editor and Contributor (Abingdon Press, 1990)
- The Tickle Papers (Abingdon Press, 1989)
- Ordinary Time: Stories of the Days Between Ascensiontide and Advent (Upper Room Books, 1988)
- What the Heart Already Knows: Stories for Advent, Christmas and Epiphany (Upper Room Books, 1985)
- Selections (Erasmus Books of Notre Dame, 1983)
- The City Essays (The Dixie Flyer Press, 1982)
- Puppeteers for Our Lady (Liturgical Drama, first production, 1982)
- On Beyond Koch (St. Luke's Press, 1981)
- American Genesis (St. Luke's Press, 1976)
- The Story of Two Johns (St. Luke's Press, 1976)
- Figs and Fury (Liturgical Drama, first production, 1976)
- It's No Fun to Be Sick (The Academy Press, 1972)
