= Ipiaçu =

Municipality in the west of the Brazilian state of Minas Gerais

Coordinates: 18°41′S 49°56′W

- Municipality
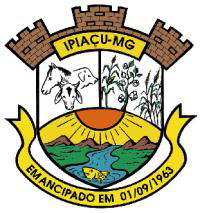
- Coat of arms
- Interactive map of Ipiaçu
- Country: Brazil
- State: Minas Gerais
- Region: Southeast
- Time zone: UTC−3 (BRT)

Location of Ipiaçu in the state of Minas Gerais

Ipiaçu is a municipality in the west of the Brazilian state of Minas Gerais. As of 2020 the population was 4,225 in a total area of 470 km^{2} (180 sq mi). It became a municipality in 1962.

== Geography ==
Ipiaçu is located at an elevation of 437 meters just south of the Paranaíba River in the Triângulo Mineiro. It belongs to the statistical microregion of Ituiutaba. Neighboring municipalities are Santa Vitória, Capinópolis and the state of Goiás.

=== Distances ===
- Belo Horizonte: 759 km.
- Santa Vitória: 28 km.
- Uberlândia: 210 km.
- Ituiutaba: 77 km.
- Itumbiara: 101

== Economic activities ==
The most important economic activities are cattle raising, commerce, and agriculture. The GDP in 2005 was R$40,025,000. Ipiaçu is in the top tier of municipalities in the state with regard to economic and social development. It is in a region of good soils, adequate rainfall, and abundance of surface water. As of 2007 there was 1 banking agency in the town. There was a small retail commerce serving the surrounding area of cattle and agricultural lands. In the rural area there were 157 establishments employing about 1,800 workers. 72 of the farms had tractors. There were 278 automobiles in all of the municipality. There were 32,000 head of cattle in 2006. The crops with a planted area of more than 100 hectares were rice, sugarcane (6,379 ha.), soybeans (4,123 ha.), sorghum (803 ha.), and corn (1,540 ha.).

== Health and education ==
In the health sector there were 03 clinics and one hospital with 14 beds. In the educational sector there were 02 primary schools and 01 middle school.

- Municipal Human Development Index: 0.764 (2000)
- State ranking: 196 out of 853 municipalities as of 2000
- National ranking: 1,491 out of 5,138 municipalities as of 2000

The highest ranking municipality in Minas Gerais in 2000 was Poços de Caldas with 0.841, while the lowest was Setubinha with 0.568. Nationally the highest was São Caetano do Sul in São Paulo with 0.919, while the lowest was Setubinha. In more recent statistics (considering 5,507 municipalities) Manari in the state of Pernambuco has the lowest rating in the country—0,467—putting it in last place.

== See also ==
- List of municipalities in Minas Gerais
