= Intermediate Geographic Region of Uberlândia =

Interurban administrative region in Minas Gerais, Brazil

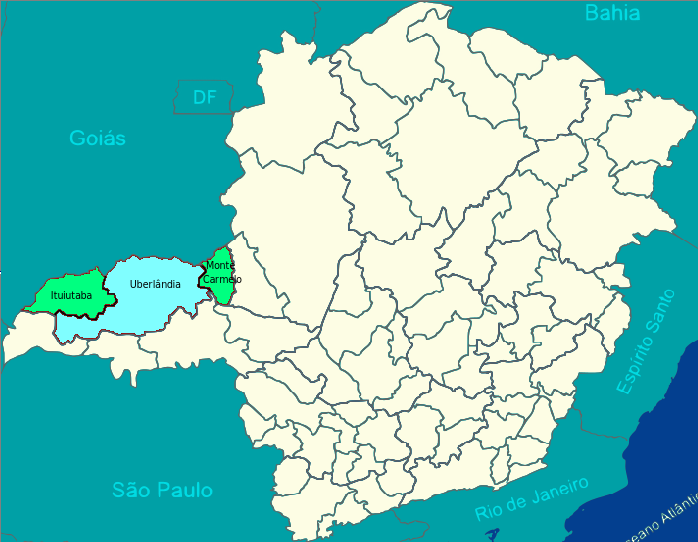
The Intermediate Geographic Region of Uberlândia, in the state of Minas Gerais, Brazil.

The Intermediate Geographic Region of Uberlândia (code 3111) is one of the 13 intermediate geographic regions in the Brazilian state of Minas Gerais and one of the 134 of Brazil, created by the National Institute of Geography and Statistics (IBGE) in 2017.

It comprises 24 municipalities, distributed in 3 immediate geographic region:

- Immediate Geographic Region of Uberlândia.
- Immediate Geographic Region of Ituiutaba.
- Immediate Geographic Region of Monte Carmelo.

== See also ==
- List of Intermediate and Immediate Geographic Regions of Minas Gerais
