= Prata, Minas Gerais =

Municipality in Minas Gerais, Brazil

Prata
- Municipality
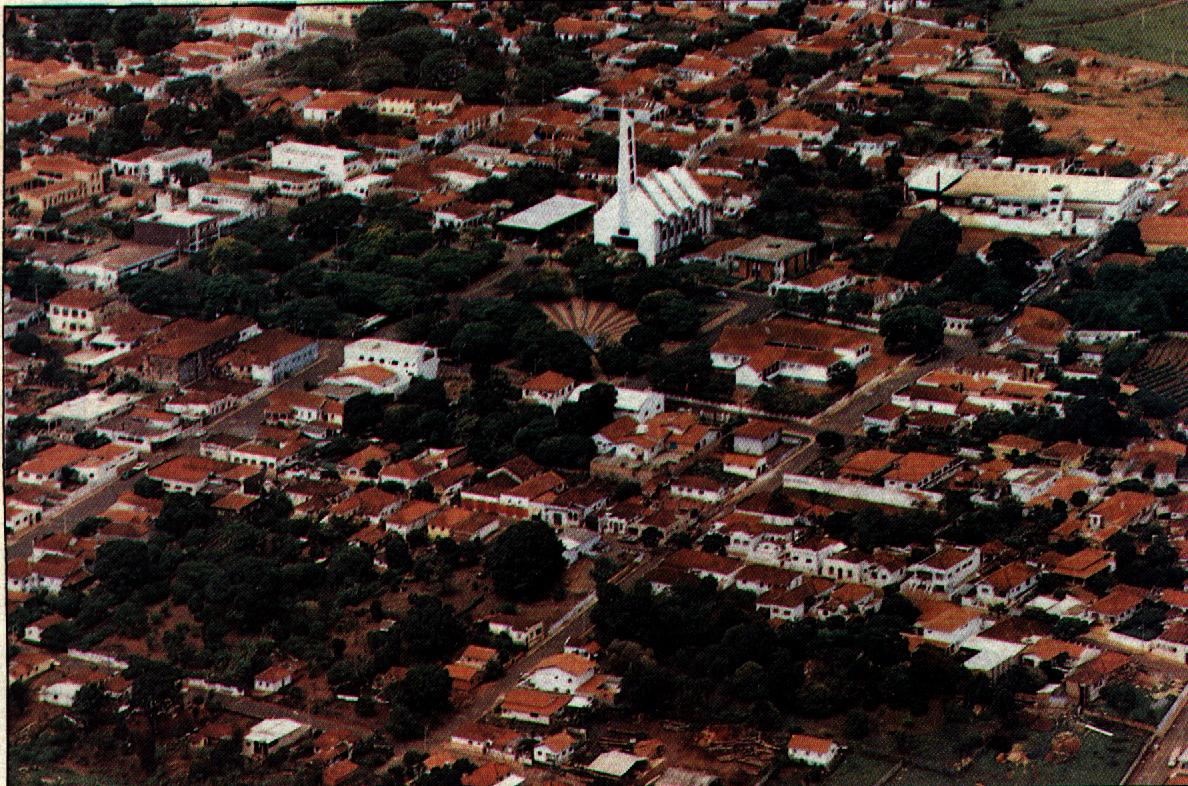
- Aerial view of central Prata

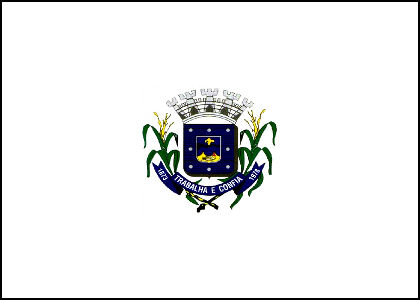
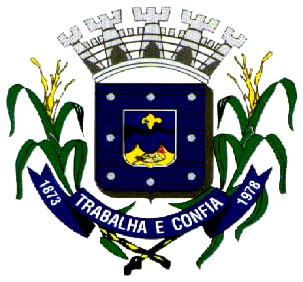
- Flag Coat of arms

- Location in Minas Gerais

- Location in Brazil
- Coordinates: 19°18′27″S 48°55′22″W
- Country: Brazil
- Region: Southeast
- State: Minas Gerais
- Intermediate region: Uberlândia
- Immediate region: Uberlândia
- Municipality created: 30 September 1848
- Restored: 27 April 1854
- City status: 15 November 1873
- Districts: Prata, Jardinésia, Patrimônio

Government
  - Mayor: Marcel Vieira Rodrigues da Cunha (2025–2028) (PP)

Area
  - Total: 4,847.544 km^{2} (1,871.647 sq mi)
- Elevation: 631 m (2,070 ft)

Population (2022)
  - Total: 28,342
  - Estimate (2025): 29,745
  - Density: 5.8467/km^{2} (15.143/sq mi)
- Demonym: pratense

Socioeconomic indicators
  - HDI (2010): 0.695
  - GDP per capita (2023): R$60,076.03
- Time zone: UTC−3 (BRT)
- Postal code: 38140-000
- Area code: 34
- Website: prata.mg.gov.br

Prata is a municipality in the Triângulo Mineiro region of western Minas Gerais, Brazil. It belongs to the Immediate Geographic Region of Uberlândia and the Intermediate Geographic Region of Uberlândia. The municipality covers 4,847.544 km^{2} (1,871.647 sq mi). Its population was 28,342 in the 2022 census and was estimated at 29,745 in 2025.

The municipality was first created in 1848, suppressed in 1850, restored under the name Prata in 1854, and installed in 1855. Its seat received city status in 1873. Prata consists of the districts of Prata, Jardinésia, and Patrimônio. Fossils found at Serra da Boa Vista formed the type material of the titanosaur Maxakalisaurus topai.

== History ==
The settlement became a district of peace named Nossa Senhora do Carmo dos Morrinhos in 1839 and a parish in 1840. Provincial Law No. 363 created the municipality on 30 September 1848, but it was suppressed in 1850. Provincial Law No. 668 restored the municipality under the name Prata on 27 April 1854, and it was installed on 2 December 1855.

Provincial Law No. 2,002 elevated the municipal seat to city status on 15 November 1873. Campina Verde was separated from Prata in 1938, when the district of Patrimônio was created from part of the district then called Jardim. Jardim was renamed Jardinésia in 1943.

== Geography ==
Prata lies in the Triângulo Mineiro of western Minas Gerais and covers 4,847.544 km^{2} (1,871.647 sq mi). The municipal seat stands at an elevation of 631 m (2,070 ft) near the BR-153 highway.

Most of the municipality occupies a moderately dissected sedimentary plateau, with residual landforms in the west and river plains in the east. Elevations range from about 492 m (1,614 ft) along the Verde River, on the boundary with Campina Verde, to 866 m (2,841 ft) at Chapadão do Prata, near the boundary with Veríssimo. The natural vegetation is predominantly Cerrado, with areas of semideciduous seasonal forest along the valleys of the principal rivers.

Prata has a tropical climate with a rainy summer, concentrated mainly from December through March, and a dry winter from May through August. Its waterways drain into two parts of the Paraná River basin. The Verde River and Boa Vista stream belong to the Grande River system, while the Tejuco, Prata, Douradinho, Cocal, Pedras, and Peixe rivers drain toward the Paranaíba River.

== Paleontology ==
Fossils excavated at Serra da Boa Vista between 1998 and 2002 were described in 2006 as the new titanosaur species Maxakalisaurus topai. The remains came from rocks of the Late Cretaceous Adamantina Formation. A reconstruction of the dinosaur was mounted at the National Museum of Brazil in 2006, becoming the first large Brazilian dinosaur assembled for exhibition in the country.

== See also ==
- List of municipalities in Minas Gerais
