= Capinópolis =

Municipality of Minas Gerais, Brazil

Coordinates: 18°40′S 49°34′W

- Municipality
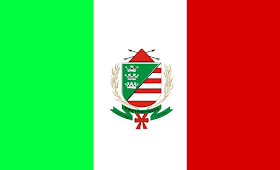
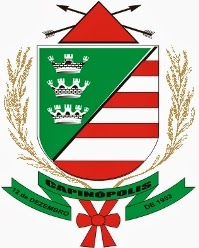
- Flag Coat of arms
- Interactive map of Capinópolis
- Country: Brazil
- State: Minas Gerais
- Region: Southeast
- Time zone: UTC−3 (BRT)

Location of Capinópolis in the state of Minas Gerais

Capinópolis is a municipality in the west of the Brazilian state of Minas Gerais. As of 2020 the population was 16,234 in a total area of 621 km^{2} (240 sq mi). It became a municipality in 1953. The name means "city of grass".

== Geography ==
Capinópolis is located at an elevation of 545 meters 30 km. south of the Paranaíba River and the Cachoeira Dourada Hydroelectric Station. It belongs to the statistical microregion of Ituiutaba. Neighboring municipalities are Canápolis, Cachoeira Dourada, Ipiaçu e Ituiutaba

=== Distances ===
- Belo Horizonte: 722 km.
- Cachoeira Dourada: 30 km.
- Itumbiara: 67 km.
- Ituiutaba: 36 km.

=== Climate ===
Capinópolis features a tropical savanna climate (Köppen: Aw) with distinct wet and dry seasons. The city experiences a wet season from October to April and a dry season from May to September.

Climate data for Capinópolis (1991–2020)
| Month | Jan | Feb | Mar | Apr | May | Jun | Jul | Aug | Sep | Oct | Nov | Dec | Year |
|---|---|---|---|---|---|---|---|---|---|---|---|---|---|
| Mean daily maximum °C (°F) | 30.7 (87.3) | 31.1 (88.0) | 31.2 (88.2) | 31.2 (88.2) | 29.4 (84.9) | 28.8 (83.8) | 29.4 (84.9) | 31.7 (89.1) | 33.2 (91.8) | 33.3 (91.9) | 31.8 (89.2) | 31.3 (88.3) | 31.1 (88.0) |
| Daily mean °C (°F) | 24.3 (75.7) | 24.4 (75.9) | 24.4 (75.9) | 23.9 (75.0) | 21.7 (71.1) | 20.8 (69.4) | 21.0 (69.8) | 22.9 (73.2) | 24.9 (76.8) | 25.6 (78.1) | 24.8 (76.6) | 24.7 (76.5) | 23.6 (74.5) |
| Mean daily minimum °C (°F) | 20.8 (69.4) | 20.6 (69.1) | 20.6 (69.1) | 19.6 (67.3) | 16.8 (62.2) | 15.7 (60.3) | 15.5 (59.9) | 16.9 (62.4) | 19.2 (66.6) | 20.4 (68.7) | 20.5 (68.9) | 20.8 (69.4) | 19.0 (66.2) |
| Average precipitation mm (inches) | 287.8 (11.33) | 217.5 (8.56) | 198.5 (7.81) | 76.2 (3.00) | 38.8 (1.53) | 19.9 (0.78) | 8.2 (0.32) | 8.4 (0.33) | 45.6 (1.80) | 110.0 (4.33) | 180.6 (7.11) | 243.7 (9.59) | 1,435.2 (56.50) |
| Average precipitation days (≥ 1.0 mm) | 16.7 | 13.1 | 13.1 | 5.5 | 3.1 | 1.6 | 0.8 | 1.2 | 4.2 | 8.1 | 12.1 | 16.0 | 95.5 |
| Average relative humidity (%) | 82.2 | 81.1 | 80.1 | 73.9 | 69.2 | 65.2 | 57.3 | 49.9 | 53.1 | 62.1 | 73.1 | 79.1 | 68.9 |
| Average dew point °C (°F) | 21.4 (70.5) | 21.4 (70.5) | 21.1 (70.0) | 19.5 (67.1) | 16.5 (61.7) | 15.0 (59.0) | 13.2 (55.8) | 12.6 (54.7) | 14.7 (58.5) | 17.9 (64.2) | 19.9 (67.8) | 21.0 (69.8) | 17.9 (64.2) |
| Mean monthly sunshine hours | 191.0 | 190.3 | 206.8 | 246.9 | 267.0 | 270.4 | 287.6 | 285.9 | 229.0 | 226.1 | 204.5 | 196.3 | 2,801.8 |
Source: NOAA

== Economic activities ==
The most important economic activities are cattle raising, commerce, and agriculture. The GDP in 2005 was R$193,698,000. Capinópolis is in the top tier of municipalities in the state with regard to economic and social development. It is in a region of good soils, adequate rainfall, and abundance of surface water. As of 2007 there were 02 banking agencies in the town. There was a small retail commerce serving the surrounding area of cattle and agricultural lands. In the rural area there were 288 establishments employing about 1,100 workers. 144 of the farms had tractors. There were 1,580 automobiles in all of the municipality. There were 29,000 head of cattle in 2006. The crops with a planted area of more than 100 hectares were cotton, sugarcane (6,050 ha.), soybeans (20,500 ha.), sorghum (6,000 ha.) and corn (4,500 ha.).

== Health and education ==
In the health sector there were 07 clinics and one hospital with 30 beds. In the educational sector there were 06 primary schools and 01 middle school.

- Municipal Human Development Index: 0.766 (2000)
- State ranking: 188 out of 853 municipalities as of 2000
- National ranking: 1,437 out of 5,138 municipalities as of 2000

The highest ranking municipality in Minas Gerais in 2000 was Poços de Caldas with 0.841, while the lowest was Setubinha with 0.568. Nationally the highest was São Caetano do Sul in São Paulo with 0.919, while the lowest was Setubinha. In more recent statistics (considering 5,507 municipalities) Manari in the state of Pernambuco has the lowest rating in the country—0,467—putting it in last place.

== See also ==
- List of municipalities in Minas Gerais
