= Centralina, Minas Gerais =

Town and municipality in the state of Minas Gerais, Brazil

Coordinates: 18°35′02″S 49°11′56″W

- Municipality
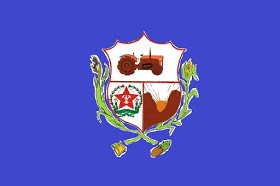
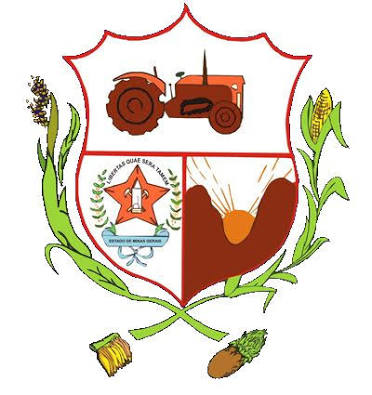
- Flag Coat of arms
- Interactive map of Centralina, Minas Gerais
- Country: Brazil
- State: Minas Gerais
- Region: Southeast
- Time zone: UTC−3 (BRT)

Location of Centralina in the state of Minas Gerais, Brazil

Centralina is a Brazilian municipality located in the west of the state of Minas Gerais. Its population as of 2020 was 10,346 living in a total area of 322 km^{2} (124 sq mi). The city belongs to the statistical mesoregion of Triângulo Mineiro and Alto Paranaíba and to the statistical microregion of Uberlândia. It became a municipality in 1954.

== Geography ==
Centralina is located at an elevation of 474 meters in the north of the rich region known as the Triângulo Mineiro. It is on the eastern bank of the Paranaíba River, just southwest of the great hydroelectric station and reservoir of Itumbiara. The western limits of the municipality are the Paranaíba River and the boundary with the state of Goiás. The important regional center of Itumbiara is a short distance to the north. Federal highway BR-153, which links Uberlândia with Goiânia passes a few kilometers east of the town.

The distance to Uberlândia is 128 km; the distance to Itumbiara is 20 km; and the distance to Belo Horizonte is 665 km. Neighboring municipalities are: Araporã (N); Itumbiara [W]; Canápolis(S); Monte Alegre de Minas (E)

== Economy ==
The main economic activities are industry, services, and agriculture, especially the growing of sugarcane. The GDP in 2005 was R$71,000.00, with 36,000.00 from services, 5,000.00 from industry, and 25,000.00 from agriculture. There were 216 rural producers on 24,000 hectares of land. 99 farms had tractors. The main crops were pineapple, bananas, cotton, sugarcane, soybeans, and corn. There were 15,800 head of cattle (2006).

== Municipal social indicators ==
The social indicators rank it in the top tier of municipalities in the state.

- Municipal Human Development Index: 0.749 (2000)
- State ranking: 288 out of 853 municipalities as of 2000
- National ranking: 1,899 out of 5,138 municipalities as of 2000
- Literacy rate: 84%
- Life expectancy: 69 (average of males and females)

The highest ranking municipality in Minas Gerais in 2000 was Poços de Caldas with 0.841, while the lowest was Setubinha with 0.568. Nationally the highest was São Caetano do Sul in São Paulo with 0.919, while the lowest was Setubinha. In more recent statistics (considering 5,507 municipalities) Manari in the state of Pernambuco has the lowest rating in the country—0,467—putting it in last place.

== See also ==
- List of municipalities in Minas Gerais
