= Monte Alegre de Minas =

Municipality in Minas Gerais, Brazil

- Municipality
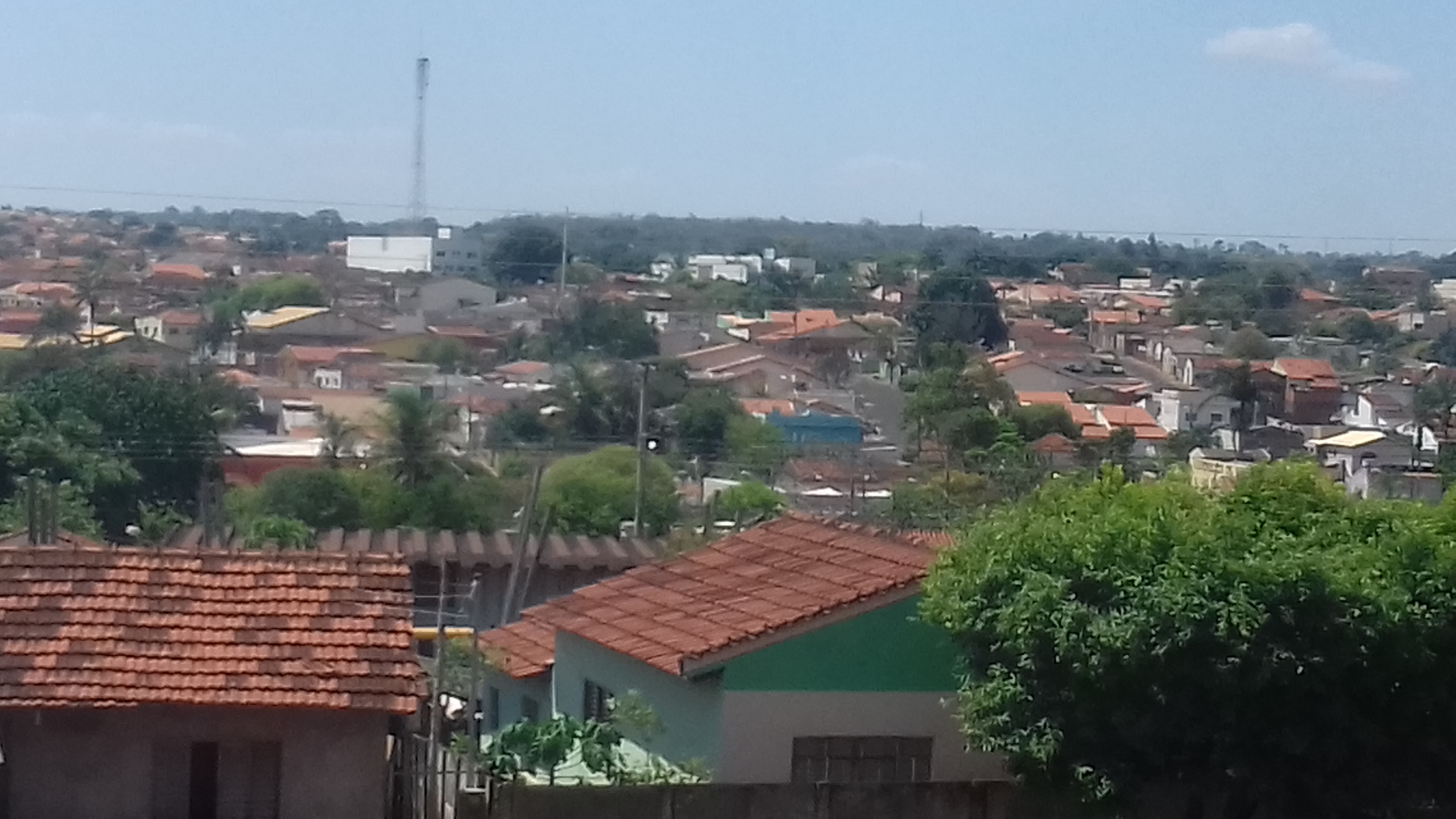
- Partial view of Monte Alegre de Minas from BR-365

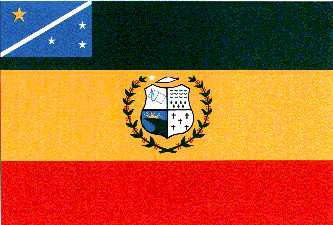
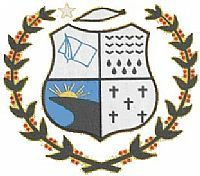
- Flag Coat of arms

- Location in Minas Gerais

- Location in Brazil
- Coordinates: 18°52′15″S 48°52′51″W
- Country: Brazil
- Region: Southeast
- State: Minas Gerais
- Intermediate region: Uberlândia
- Immediate region: Uberlândia
- Established as a municipality: 16 September 1870
- City status: 3 January 1880

Government
  - Mayor: Rodrigo de Alvim Mendonça (2025–2028) (PSD)

Area
  - Total: 2,595.957 km^{2} (1,002.305 sq mi)

Population (2022)
  - Total: 20,170
  - Estimate (2025): 20,708
  - Density: 7.770/km^{2} (20.12/sq mi)
- Demonym: monte-alegrense

Socioeconomic indicators
  - HDI (2010): 0.674
  - GDP per capita (2023): R$44,805.21
- Time zone: UTC−3 (BRT)
- Postal code: 38475-000
- Area code: 34
- Website: www.montealegre.mg.gov.br

Monte Alegre de Minas is a municipality in the Triângulo Mineiro region of western Minas Gerais, Brazil. It lies within the immediate and intermediate geographic regions of Uberlândia. The municipality covers 2,595.957 km^{2} (1,002.305 sq mi). Its population was 20,170 in the 2022 census and was estimated at 20,708 in 2025.

Monte Alegre de Minas was separated from Prata and established as a municipality on 16 September 1870. Its seat received city status on 3 January 1880.

== History ==
Monte Alegre became a district under Provincial Law No. 247 of 20 July 1843. Provincial Law No. 1664 created the municipality on 16 September 1870, and Provincial Law No. 2556 gave its seat city status on 3 January 1880.

== See also ==
- List of municipalities in Minas Gerais
