= Uberlândia =

Municipality in Minas Gerais, Brazil

- Municipality
- Municipality of Uberlândia
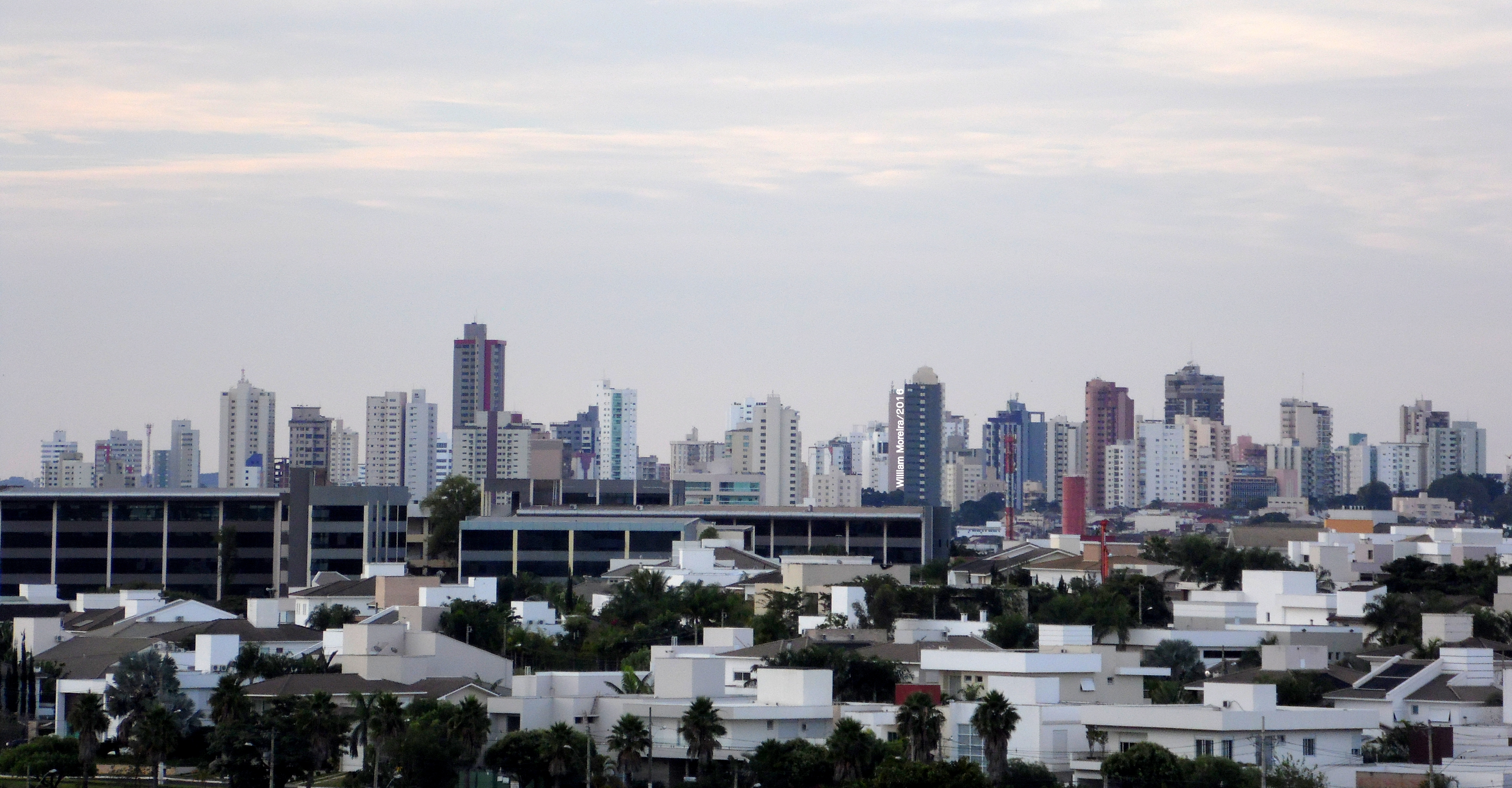
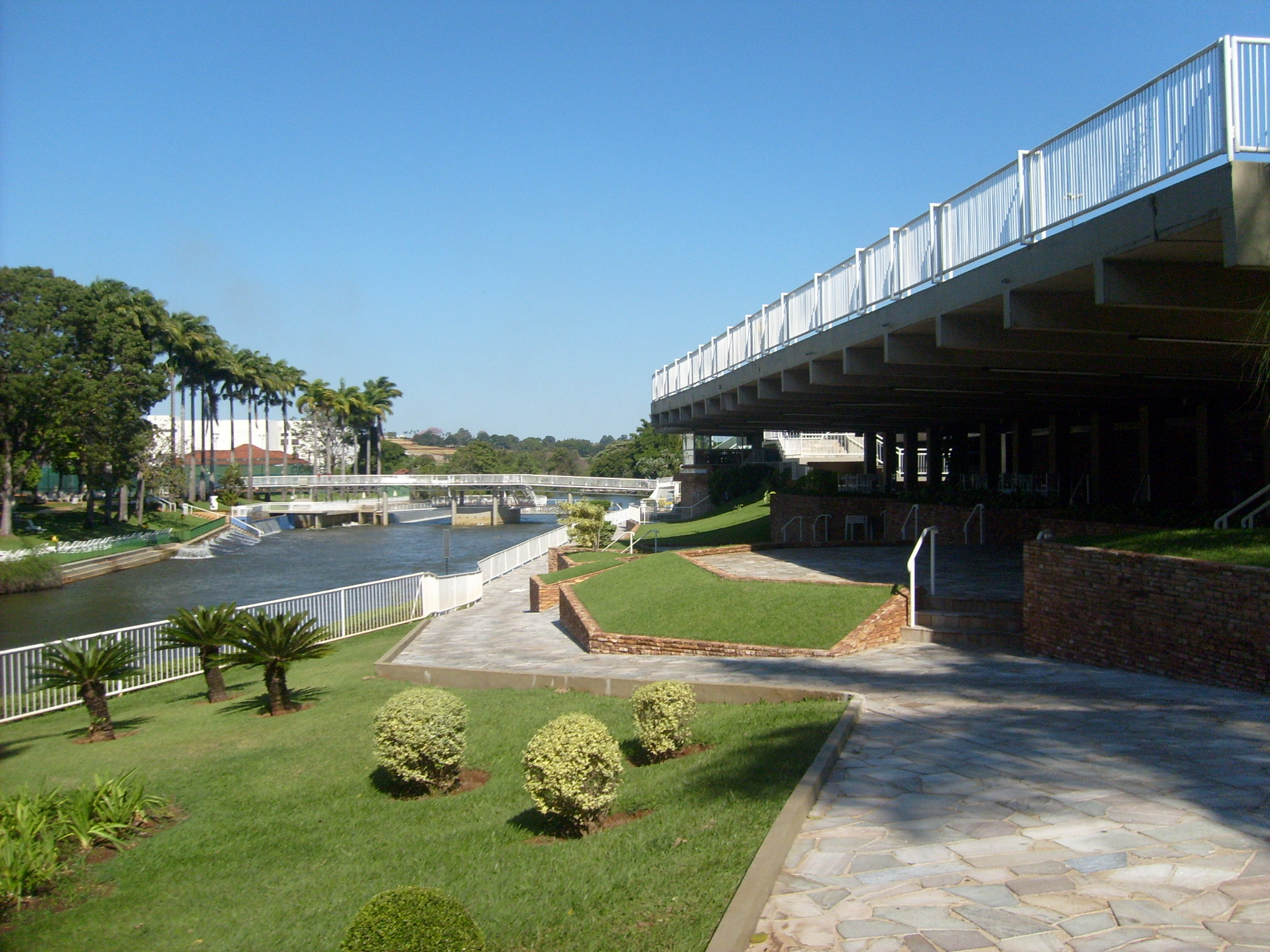
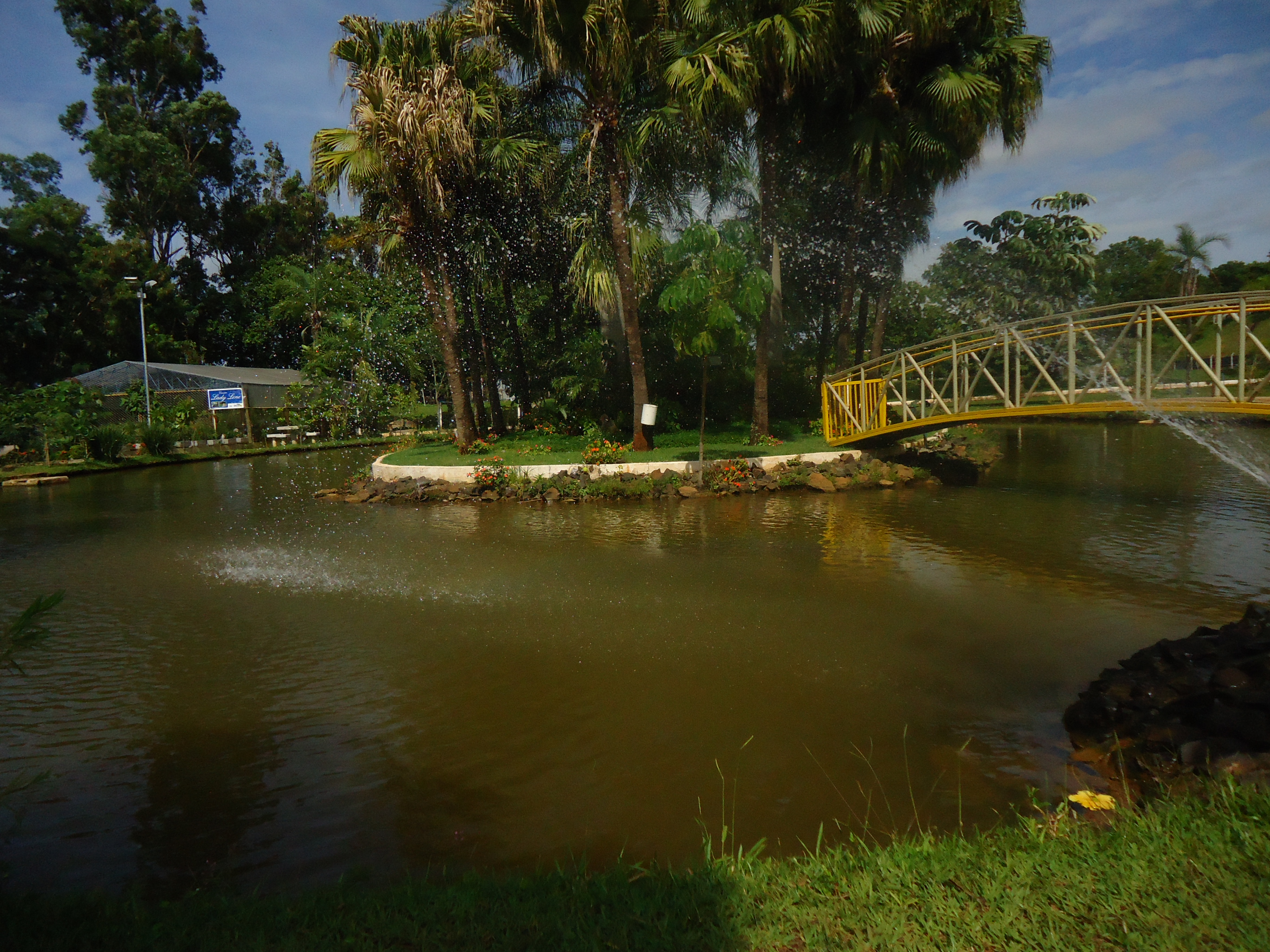
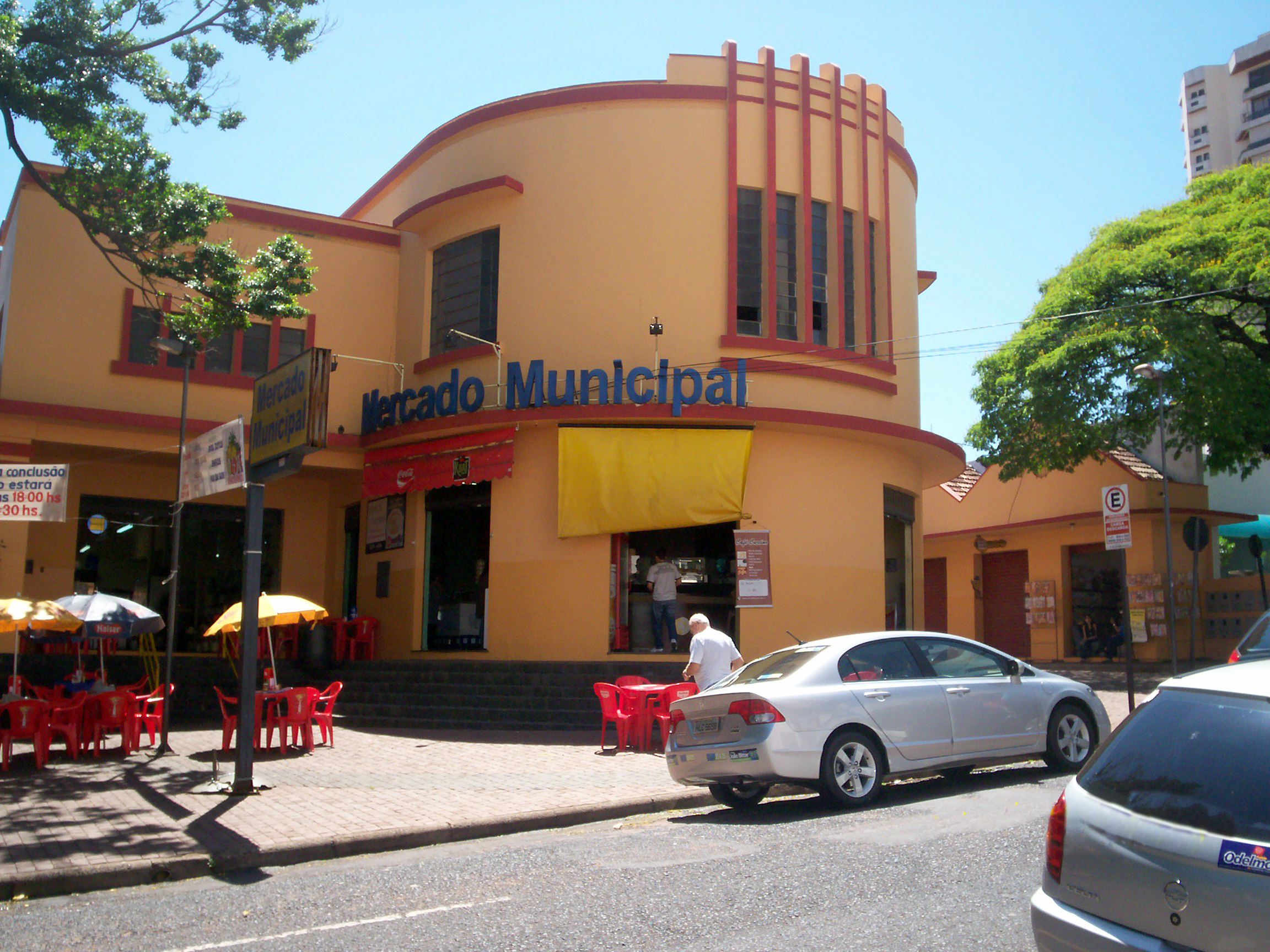
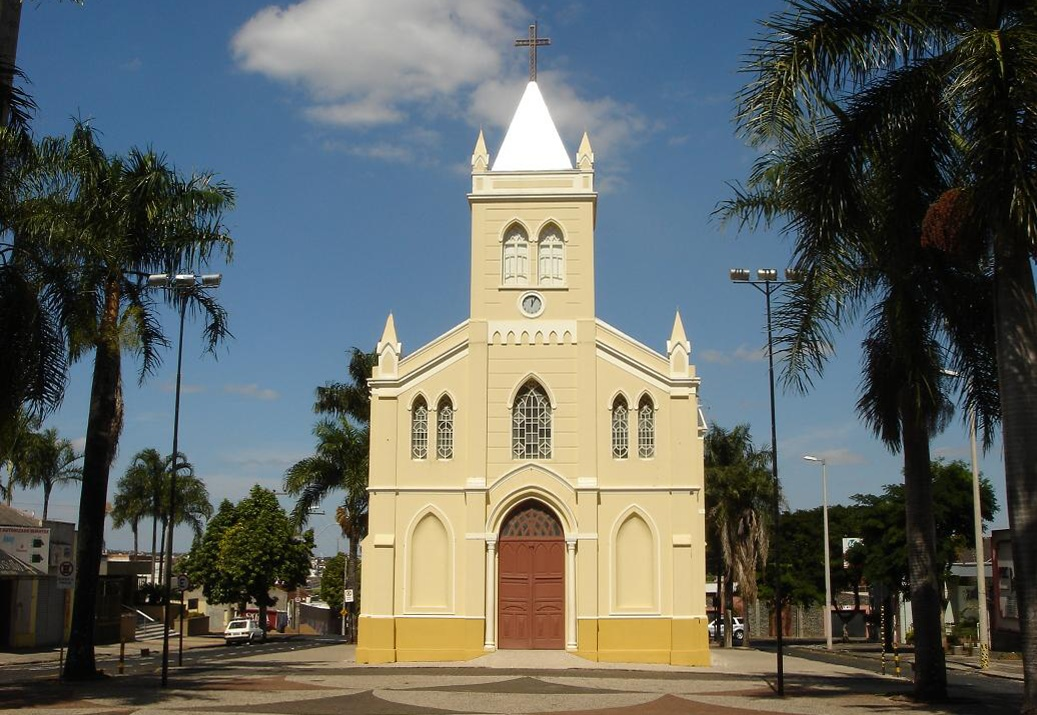
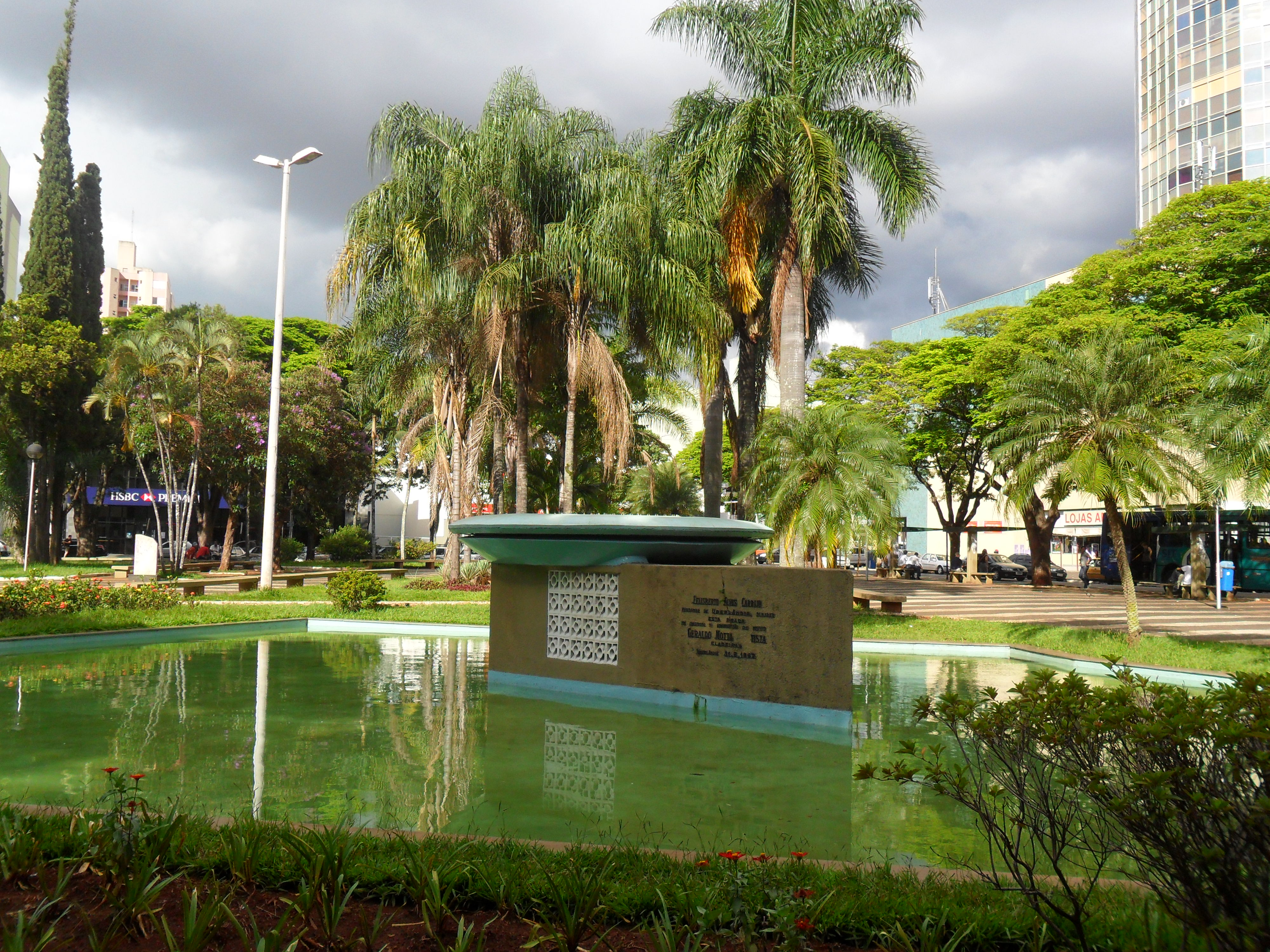
- Cityscape of Uberlândia Praia Clube Parque do Sabiá Uberlândia Municipal Market Nossa Senhora do Rosário Church Tubal Vilela Square

- Flag
- Nicknames: "Logistics Capital" "Gateway to the Cerrado" "Udi"
- Location in Minas Gerais

- Location in Brazil
- Coordinates: 18°55′23″S 48°17′19″W
- Country: Brazil
- State: Minas Gerais
- Region: Southeast
- Intermediate Region: Uberlândia
- Immediate Region: Uberlândia
- Distance to capital: 537 km
- Neighboring municipalities: South: Veríssimo; Southeast: Uberaba; North: Araguari; East: Indianópolis; West: Monte Alegre de Minas; Northwest: Tupaciguara; Southwest: Prata
- Founded: 31 August 1888

Government
  - Mayor: Paulo Sérgio Ferreira (PP)
  - Term ends: 2028

Area
  - Total: 4,115.206 km^{2} (1,588.890 sq mi)
- Elevation: 863 m (2,831 ft)

Population (IBGE/2024 estimate)
  - Total: 754,954
  - Rank: MG: 2nd; BR: 28th
  - Density: 183.455/km^{2} (475.146/sq mi)
- Demonym: Uberlandense
- Time zone: UTC−3 (BRT)
- Postal code (CEP): 38400-000 to 38439-999
- HDI (UNDP/2010): 0.789
- GDP (IBGE/2021): R$43,129,284.92
- GDP per capita (IBGE/2021): R$61,038.02
- Climate: Tropical
- Website: www.uberlandia.mg.gov.br

Uberlândia (Brazilian Portuguese pronunciation: [ubɛʁˈlɐ̃dʒi.ɐ]) is a Brazilian municipality located in the interior of the state of Minas Gerais, in the region known as Triângulo Mineiro, Southeast Region of the country. With a population of 754,954 inhabitants, according to the 2024 population estimate by the Brazilian Institute of Geography and Statistics (IBGE), it is the second-largest city and municipality in the state, after the capital, Belo Horizonte.

Located 537 kilometers from the state capital, Belo Horizonte, the Uberlândia region was inhabited by Caiapó and Bororo indigenous peoples until the arrival of the bandeirante Bartolomeu Bueno da Silva in 1632. In the late 1880s, the municipality of São Pedro de Uberabinha gained independence from Uberaba, but it was not until 1929 that the city was renamed "Uberlândia." Following emancipation, the city's urban area experienced significant growth, and by the early 20th century, Uberlândia had already diversified its industrial sectors.

The gross domestic product (GDP) of the municipality is the 27th largest in Brazil, standing out in the area of service provision. In terms of tourism, the city attracts visitors with its various cultural, natural, and architectural attractions, such as the Uberlândia Municipal Market, Parque do Sabiá, Victorio Siquierolli Municipal Park, Clarimundo Carneiro Square, Tubal Vilela Square, Bicota/Rosário Square, and the renowned Rondon Pacheco Avenue.

== Etymology ==
The original name of the current city of Uberlândia was São Pedro de Uberabinha, a designation received when it was elevated to a district of Uberaba on 21 May 1852. By State Law No. 23, of 14 March 1891, it was renamed Uberabinha, coinciding with its establishment date. By State Law No. 1,128, of 19 October 1929, the city was renamed Uberlândia, a name it retains to this day.

"Uberlândia" is a term composed of two words from different origins: "uber" and "lândia":

- "Uber" comes from Latin ("fertile"), although this etymology is debated;
- "Lândia" comes from the German land ("land").

== History ==
=== Origins ===
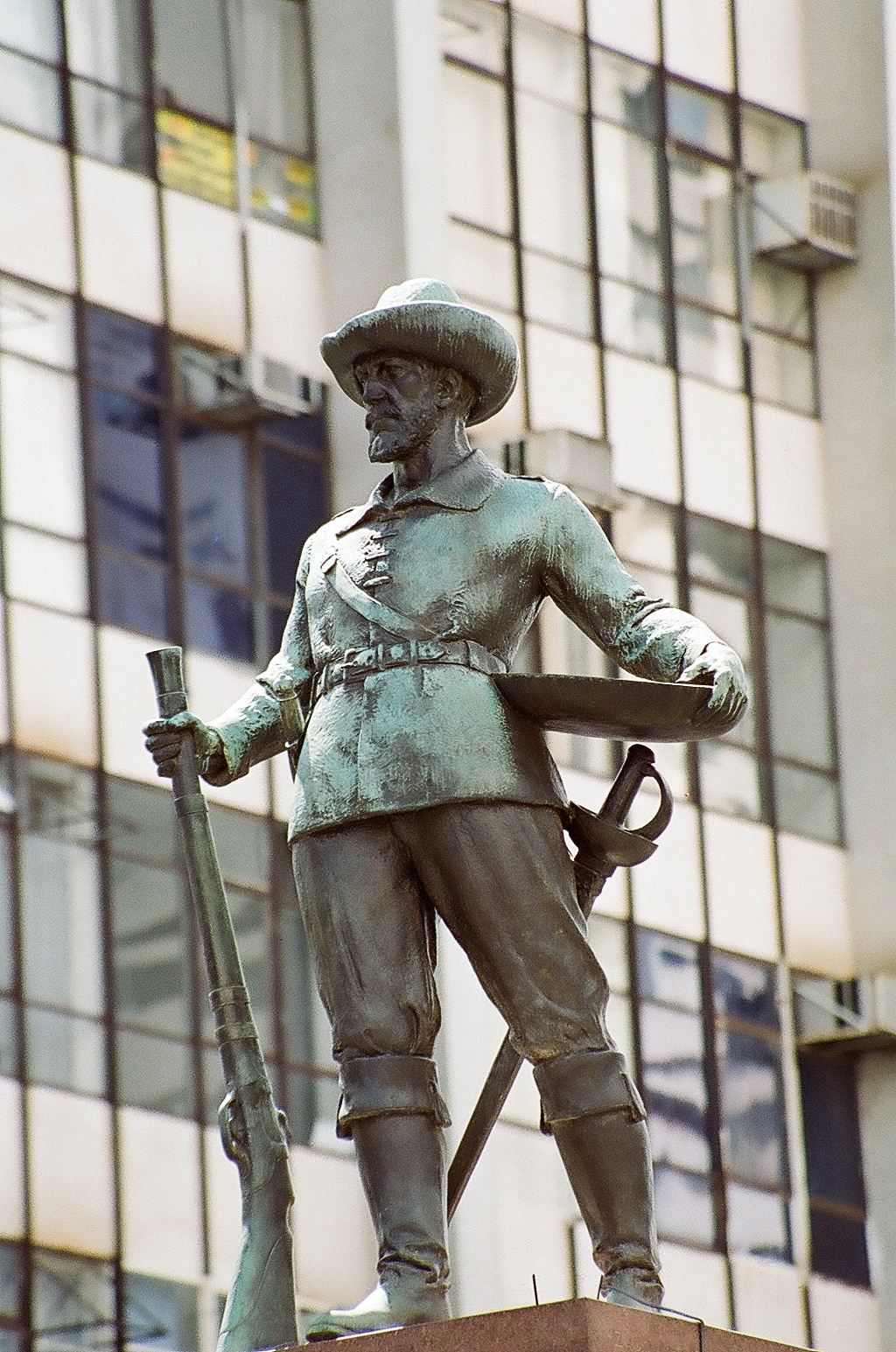
Monument to Bartolomeu Bueno da Silva, in Goiânia/GO.

The first European to set foot in the region of the current municipality of Uberlândia, a territory then inhabited by Caiapó and Bororo indigenous peoples, was the bandeirante Bartolomeu Bueno da Silva in 1632. The region, initially part of the Captaincy of São Vicente, was incorporated into the Captaincy of Minas Gerais and São Paulo by a Royal Charter of 3 November 1709. João Pereira da Rocha (1818), after the region was explored by bandeirantes, settled in the area, marking land near the Aldeia de Santana (now Indianópolis). There, he established the headquarters of the sesmaria, which he named São Francisco Farm, giving rise to the municipality. He also demarcated the Letreiro Farm and Salto Farm and named a waterway he found Ribeirão São Pedro. João Pereira's arrival attracted many other families, including the Carrejos, who, in 1835, acquired part of the São Francisco Farm and nearby properties, forming settlements named Olhos d'Água, Lage, Marimbondo, and Tenda (Felisberto's). Felisberto Alves Carrijo, legally recognized as the city's founder in 1964, was a teacher educated in missionary schools. He established the first school in the municipality at his home and led Sunday rosary prayers. A settlement formed, later named Nossa Senhora do Carmo in honor of a chapel of the same name, inaugurated on 20 October 1853.

On 11 June 1857, twelve additional alqueires donated by Luís Alves Pereira's wife, Custódia Fernandes dos Santos, and other citizens were incorporated into the settlement's patrimony. This area, already inhabited by enslaved people, gave rise to the Patrimônio neighborhood in the southern zone, under Provincial Law No. 831. Exactly one month later, the Parish of São Pedro de Uberabinha was created. In 1861, the Chapel of Our Lady of Mount Carmel was expanded, becoming the Nossa Senhora do Carmo de São Pedro de Uberabinha Parish Church, which was demolished in 1943.

=== Administrative and political formation ===
By Decree No. 51, of 7 June 1888, the parishes of Santa Maria and São Pedro de Uberabinha were elevated to the status of a town. Two months later, on 31 August of that year, the municipality of São Pedro de Uberabinha, now Uberlândia, was created, separating from Uberaba, under Provincial Law No. 4,643. Over the years, there were several changes in district subdivisions. In the 1911 general census records, the municipality consisted of the districts of Uberabinha (seat) and Santa Maria. By State Law No. 843, of 7 September 1923, the Martinópolis district was created with land detached from the seat district. By State Decree-Law No. 1,058, of 31 December 1943, the districts of Tapuirama and Cruzeiro dos Peixotos were created. Under the same decree-law, the Santa Maria district was renamed Miraporanga, and Martinópolis was renamed Martinésia.

On 14 March 1891, the village of São Pedro de Uberabinha was established and the first Municipal Council was inaugurated. The creation of the judicial district of São Pedro de Uberabinha occurred under Law Eleven, of 13 November of that year. On 21 December, the Civil Court of the Uberabinha Judicial Term, Judicial District of Araguari, was established. On 7 March 1892, the first Municipal Chamber of São Pedro de Uberabinha was sworn in, with Augusto César Ferreira e Souza as the executive agent. On 22 March, the first jury session was held, presided over by Duarte Pimentel de Ulhôa, the first judge of the judicial district, a position he held from 1892 until his death on 2 January 1928.

=== Consolidation ===
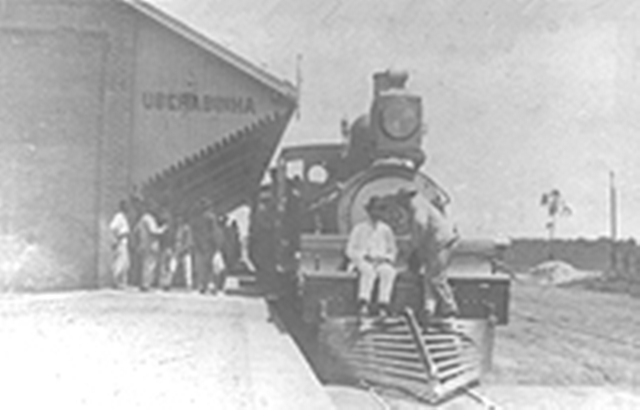
Mogiana Station in Uberlândia

After Uberlândia's emancipation, the city's urban area experienced significant growth. In 1897, the first secondary school in the municipality was established: the Uberabinhense School. On 7 January of the same year, the newspaper "A Reforma," the city's first newspaper, began circulation, founded and directed by Professor João Luiz da Silva. By the early 20th century, the city had diversified its industries to include a brewery, a shoe factory, a cigarette factory, a blacksmith shop, a carpentry shop, and a saddlery shop. Besides these relatively simple industries, which produced household goods, construction materials, agricultural tools, and riding equipment, there was an agropastoral industry that, though rudimentary, was regulated by the Municipal Code. The pastoral industry centered on raising cattle for local consumption and pigs for both consumption and export to other municipalities and states.

On unpaved streets and avenues, wagons, carts, and oxcarts operated under regulated traffic. This legislation governed vehicle registration, passenger capacity for carts, fare prices, and animal welfare standards. Besides wagons and carts, oxcarts were among the most significant and demanded means of transport. Even with the arrival of the Mogiana Railway in Uberabinha in 1895, these transport methods retained their importance, as trade between the city and areas not served by rail relied on oxcarts for transporting goods. For small purchases, visits, and various other activities, horses were used as a means of transport.

=== 20th century ===
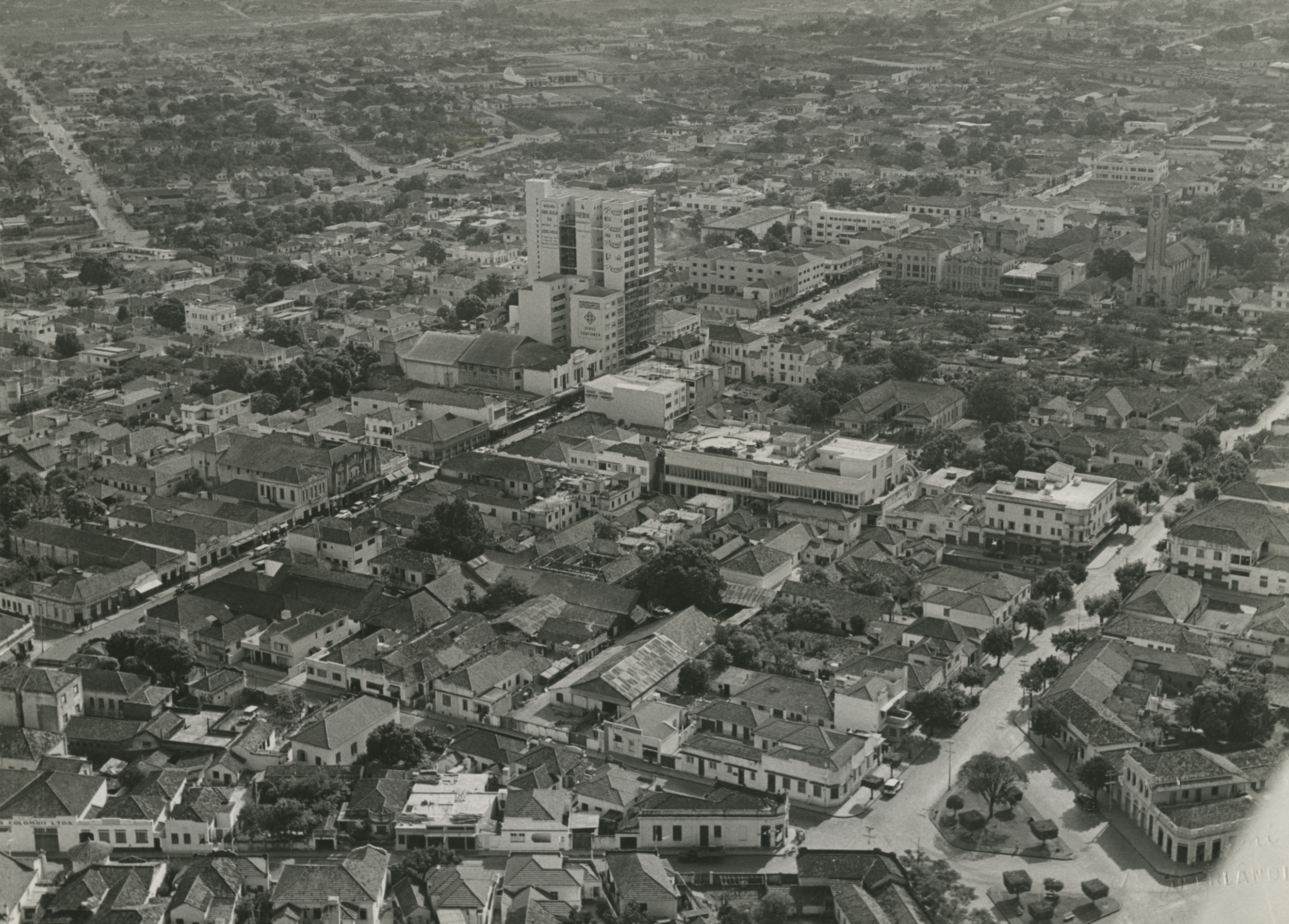
Uberlândia, September 1969. National Archives.

Until 1908, the population's social activities revolved around religious celebrations and sacraments, such as attending Mass on Sundays, participating in baptisms, weddings, and organizing and attending kermesses, which helped fulfill religious duties and fostered community ties. Sunday band performances were also held. Additionally, some residents enjoyed organizing and participating in beauty pageants. There were also gaming houses which served as social interaction spaces.

With the city's demographic growth, there was a need to invest in municipal infrastructure and culture. Throughout the 20th century, about ten movie theaters were established in Uberlândia. Several entertainment venues and theaters were also opened, along with the Cultural Center, an institution housing the municipality's cultural collections, inaugurated in 2008. Its headquarters is located in a building constructed between 1922 and 1924, originally intended as the residence of Eduardo Marquez, mayor from 1923 to 1926.

== Geography ==
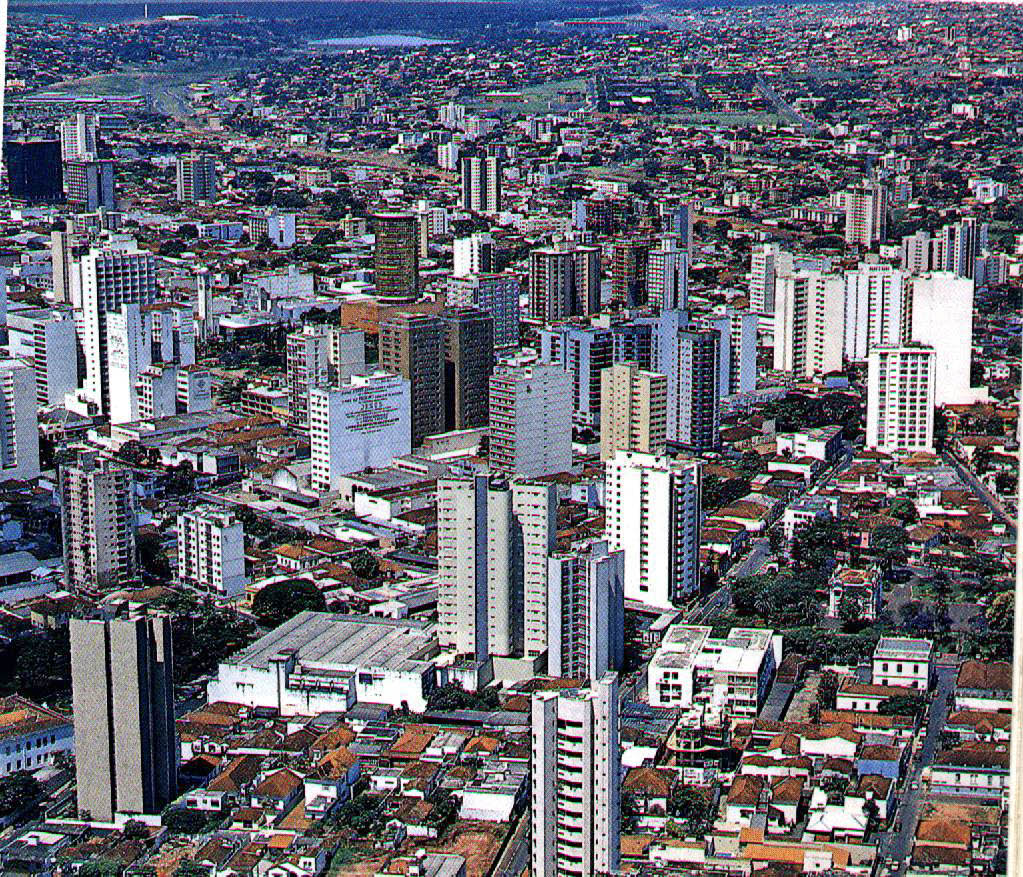
Aerial photography of the city center in 2006

The municipality's area is 4,115.82 km², representing 0.7017% of the state, 0.4452% of the Southeast Region, and 0.0484% of the entire Brazilian territory. Of this total, 135.3492 km² are within the urban perimeter.

Uberlândia's average elevation is 887 m. The highest point in the municipality is located at the headwaters of Cachoeirinha Stream, measuring 930 m. The lowest elevation is at the mouth of the Uberabinha River, at 622 m. The municipal seat is situated at an elevation of 863.18 m. The municipality is located within the Plateaus and Highlands domain of the Paraná Basin, specifically in the Southern Plateau subunit of the Paraná Basin. It features a typical highland landscape (gently rolling over sedimentary formations, with spaced valleys). The characteristic vegetation in this region is the Cerrado and its variants. The soils are acidic and have low fertility. Approximately 70% of Uberlândia's territory consists of rolling terrain, with the remaining 30% being flat.

=== Hydrography ===
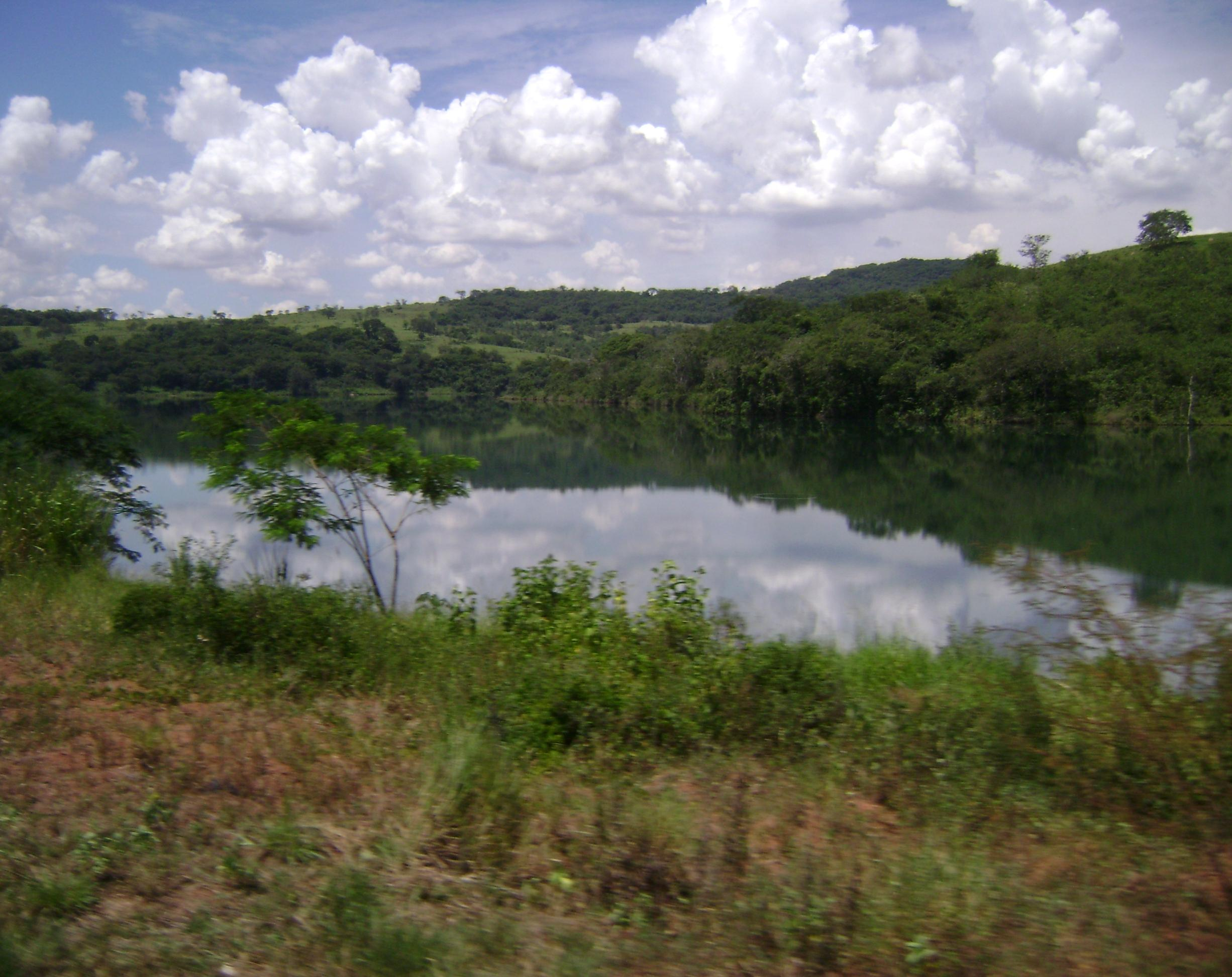
Araguari River seen from BR-050.

Uberlândia is located within the Paranaíba River basin, with several sub-basins of small and medium streams playing significant roles in its configuration. It is drained by the Tijuco River basin (the second largest tributary of the Paranaíba River), located in the south and southwest of the municipality, with main tributaries including the Babilônia, Douradinho, and Estiva Streams, the Cabaçal River, all in rural areas, and the Araguari River. The Araguari basin covers the eastern portion of the municipality. Its main tributary within the municipality is the Uberabinha River, which runs through the urban perimeter. The hydroelectric potential of this river is exploited through the operation of the Nova Ponte, Miranda, and Amador Aguiar I and II hydroelectric plants.

The Uberabinha River is part of the Araguari River basin and highly significant for the city. Along with its tributaries, it serves as the water source for the population. The main tributaries of the Araguari in rural areas are the Beija-Flor, Rio das Pedras, and Bom Jardim Streams, another important water source for the municipality's water supply. In the urban area, the Uberabinha River has smaller tributaries, such as the Cajubá, Tabocas, São Pedro (fully channeled), Vinhedo, Lagoinha, Liso, do Salto, Guaribas, Bons Olhos, do Óleo, and Cavalo Streams, among others.

=== Ecology and environment ===
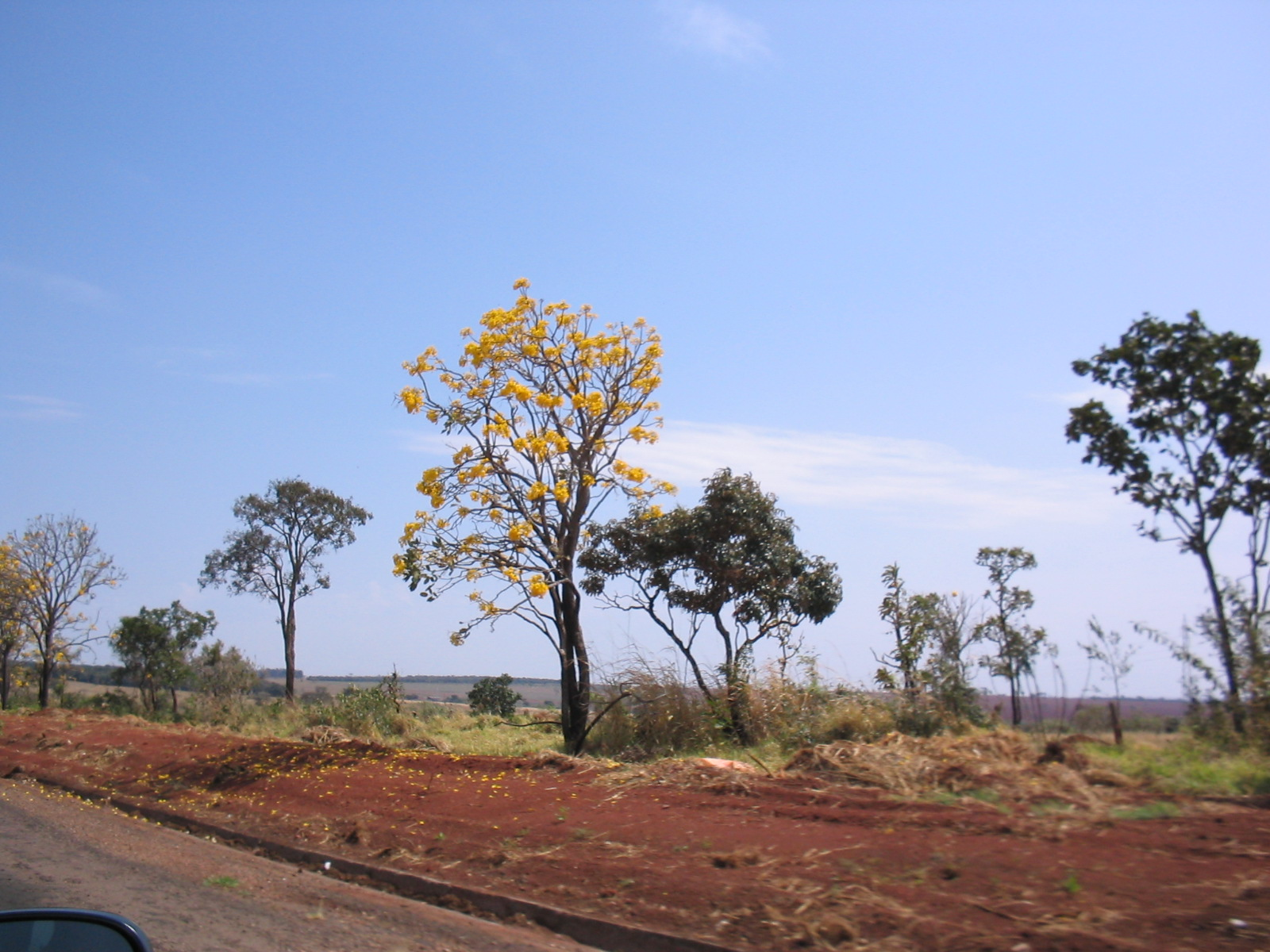
Cerrado in the city's surroundings.

The predominant vegetation in the municipality is the Cerrado and its variants, such as clean fields, dirty fields, cerradões, floodplain forests, riparian forests, and mesophytic forests. Only in the western part of the municipality, where altitudes range from 700 to 850 m, are the soils shallower with low fertility, and the predominant vegetation is semideciduous forest.

The city has eleven areas protected by environmental legislation, known as Conservation Units, which include riparian forest along the banks of watercourses (rivers, streams, etc.), protecting their waters against siltation and their slopes against erosion, contributing to the preservation of the fauna and flora of the Cerrado.

To further environmental preservation, the city hall has organized the Environment Week annually in June since 2007, with an average participation of approximately 1,500 people. The event includes lectures, workshops, and guided visits.

The city of Uberlândia also features several other green spaces, such as:

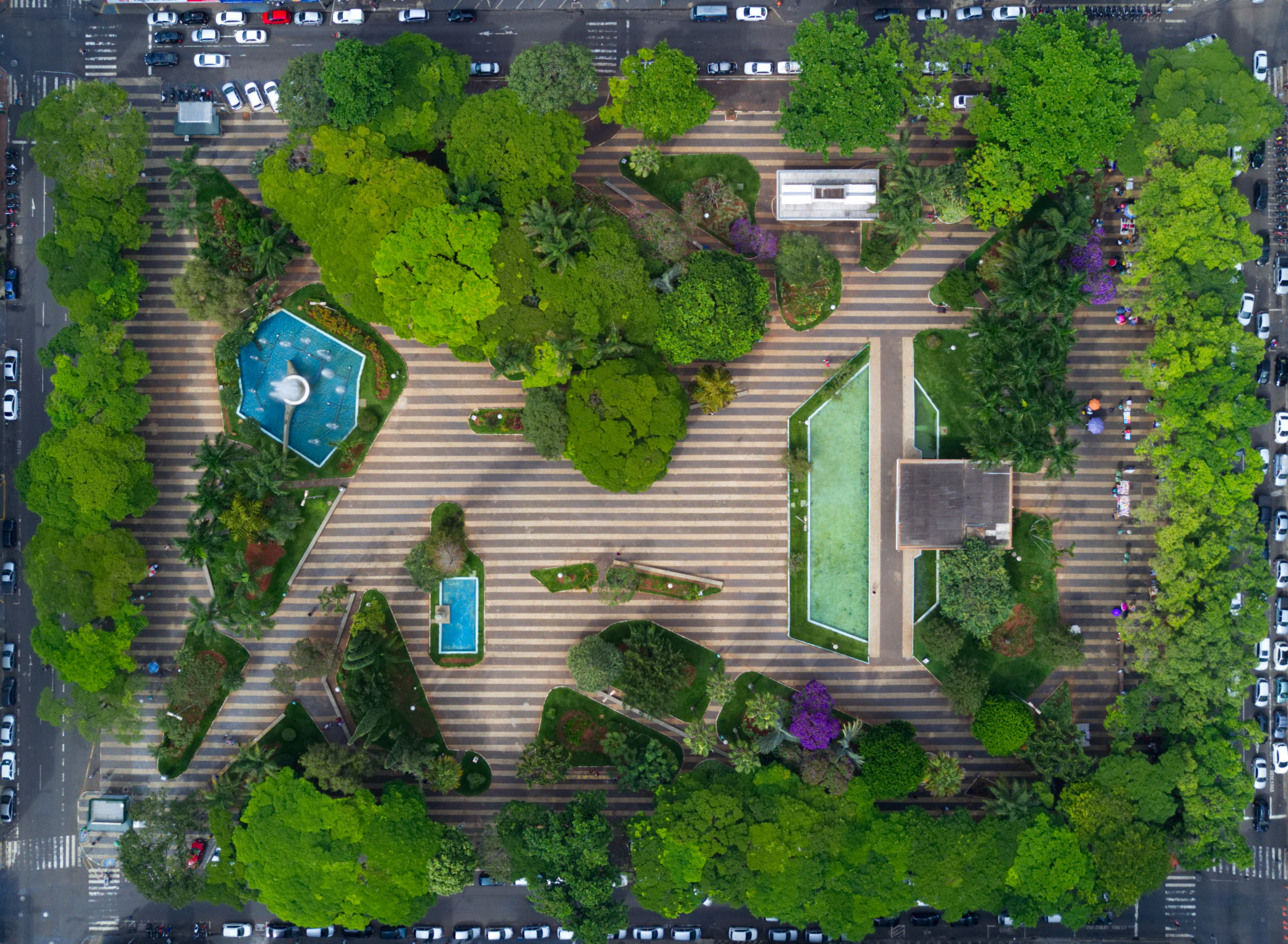
Tubal Vilela Square

- Parque do Sabiá: A park/zoo managed by FUTEL (Uberlândia Tourism, Sports, and Leisure Foundation), located in the Tibery neighborhood, East Zone of the city. It is a green complex comprising a zoo with dozens of captive animal species; seven lakes forming a large lagoon; an aquarium, housing 36 aquariums with 36 different fish species; a 5,100-meter running track; and other attractions.
- Victorio Siquierolli Municipal Park: Located in the North Zone of Uberlândia, it features authentic examples of Cerrado vegetation, including leathery-leafed trees with twisted, rough trunks, colorful flowers, and wild fruits, as well as a playground for children and a Cerrado biodiversity museum. It covers a total area of 232,300 square meters and is situated between the Jardim América II, Residencial Gramado, Nossa Senhora das Graças, and Cruzeiro do Sul neighborhoods.
- Tubal Vilela Square, Clarimundo Carneiro Square, Sérgio Pacheco Square, and Bicota Square (Rui Barbosa Square) also are significant tourist attractions in the city.

=== Climate ===
Highest 24-hour precipitation accumulations recorded in Uberlândia (UFU) by month (INMET)
| Month | Accumulation | Date | Month | Accumulation | Date |
|---|---|---|---|---|---|
| January | 126.8 mm | 19 January 1983 | July | 43.3 mm | 20 July 1983 |
| February | 88.2 mm | 8 February 1995 | August | 44.5 mm | 9 August 1998 |
| March | 96.6 mm | 15 March 1997 | September | 77.6 mm | 23 September 2006 |
| April | 69 mm | 6 April 1991 | October | 82.4 mm | 18 October 2006 |
| May | 78.6 mm | 30 May 2013 | November | 129.8 mm | 9 November 1999 |
| June | 56 mm | 6 June 1997 | December | 157.8 mm | 12 December 1986 |
Period: 1 December 1980 to 30 November 1984 and 1 January 1986–present

The climate of Uberlândia is characterized as tropical, with reduced rainfall in winter and an annual average temperature of around 22 °C. Autumn and spring are transitional seasons. Rainfall is slightly above 1,600 millimeters (mm), concentrated in the summer months. Precipitation occurs as rain, with occasional hail. During the dry season, the municipality often records critically low relative humidity levels, sometimes below 20%, with levels below 30% considered a state of alert.

According to data from the weather station of the National Institute of Meteorology (INMET), located at the Federal University of Uberlândia (UFU), covering the periods from 1980 to 1984 and from 1986 onward, the lowest temperature recorded in the city was 1 °C on 21 July 1981, and the highest reached 38.5 °C on 7 October 2020. The highest 24-hour precipitation accumulation was 157.8 mm on 12 December 1986. Other significant accumulations of 100 mm or more include: 129.8 mm on 9 November 1999, 126.8 mm on 19 January 1983, 116.8 mm on 20 December 2007, 106.2 mm on 15 January 2002, and 105.8 mm on 1 December 1980.

Climate data for Uberlândia (1981–2010 normals, extremes 1980–present)
| Month | Jan | Feb | Mar | Apr | May | Jun | Jul | Aug | Sep | Oct | Nov | Dec | Year |
|---|---|---|---|---|---|---|---|---|---|---|---|---|---|
| Record high °C (°F) | 35.2 (95.4) | 35.0 (95.0) | 34.0 (93.2) | 33.9 (93.0) | 32.2 (90.0) | 31.3 (88.3) | 32.1 (89.8) | 36.0 (96.8) | 38.0 (100.4) | 38.5 (101.3) | 37.5 (99.5) | 35.4 (95.7) | 38.5 (101.3) |
| Mean daily maximum °C (°F) | 29.4 (84.9) | 29.9 (85.8) | 29.5 (85.1) | 29.2 (84.6) | 27.5 (81.5) | 26.8 (80.2) | 27.0 (80.6) | 29.3 (84.7) | 30.6 (87.1) | 30.8 (87.4) | 29.6 (85.3) | 29.1 (84.4) | 29.1 (84.4) |
| Daily mean °C (°F) | 23.6 (74.5) | 23.7 (74.7) | 23.4 (74.1) | 22.8 (73.0) | 20.6 (69.1) | 19.3 (66.7) | 19.2 (66.6) | 21.2 (70.2) | 23.2 (73.8) | 23.8 (74.8) | 23.5 (74.3) | 23.2 (73.8) | 22.3 (72.1) |
| Mean daily minimum °C (°F) | 19.6 (67.3) | 19.5 (67.1) | 19.4 (66.9) | 18.2 (64.8) | 15.7 (60.3) | 14.3 (57.7) | 13.9 (57.0) | 15.3 (59.5) | 17.5 (63.5) | 18.7 (65.7) | 19.1 (66.4) | 19.2 (66.6) | 17.5 (63.5) |
| Record low °C (°F) | 15.8 (60.4) | 15.2 (59.4) | 11.2 (52.2) | 8.0 (46.4) | 5.6 (42.1) | 1.1 (34.0) | 1.0 (33.8) | 4.6 (40.3) | 5.0 (41.0) | 10.0 (50.0) | 12.0 (53.6) | 13.8 (56.8) | 1.0 (33.8) |
| Average precipitation mm (inches) | 299.0 (11.77) | 201.8 (7.94) | 225.5 (8.88) | 83.1 (3.27) | 33.9 (1.33) | 19.2 (0.76) | 7.8 (0.31) | 15.3 (0.60) | 46.4 (1.83) | 116.3 (4.58) | 215.1 (8.47) | 342.7 (13.49) | 1,606.1 (63.23) |
| Average precipitation days (≥ 1.0 mm) | 17 | 15 | 14 | 7 | 3 | 1 | 1 | 2 | 5 | 9 | 13 | 19 | 106 |
| Average relative humidity (%) | 78.8 | 77.2 | 78.9 | 73.9 | 70.9 | 68.1 | 61.9 | 56.3 | 58.7 | 66.9 | 74.0 | 79.5 | 70.4 |
| Mean monthly sunshine hours | 167.5 | 167.5 | 171.2 | 211.7 | 223.2 | 223.6 | 243.9 | 243.3 | 203.7 | 195.4 | 176.8 | 145.2 | 2,373 |
Source: Instituto Nacional de Meteorologia

== Demography ==
Historical population
| Year | Pop. | ±% |
|---|---|---|
| 1970 | 126,112 | — |
| 1980 | 240,967 | +91.1% |
| 1991 | 367,061 | +52.3% |
| 2000 | 501,214 | +36.5% |
| 2010 | 604,013 | +20.5% |
| 2022 | 713,232 | +18.1% |
IBGE demographic censuses

In the census of 2022 conducted by the Brazilian Institute of Geography and Statistics (IBGE), the municipality's population was 713,224 inhabitants, with a population density of 173.31 inh./km². In 2024, its population was estimated at 754,954 inhabitants.

According to the census of 2010, 48.83% of the population were men (294,914 inhabitants), 51.17% were women (309,099 inhabitants), 97.23% (587,266 inhabitants) lived in the urban area, and 2.77% (16,747 inhabitants) in the rural area.

The Municipal Human Development Index of Uberlândia is considered high by the United Nations Development Programme (UNDP). Its value is 0.789, making it the third highest in the state of Minas Gerais (out of 853), the 41st in the entire Southeast Region (out of 1,666 municipalities), and the 123rd in all of Brazil (out of 5,507 municipalities). In 2010, the education index was 0.716, compared to Brazil's 0.849. The longevity index is 0.885 (Brazil's is 0.787), and the income index is 0.776 (Brazil's is 0.723). The city has high indicators above the national average according to the UNDP. The per capita income is 22,926.50 reais. Its Gini Index is 0.39, where 1.00 is the worst and 0.00 is the best. The poverty incidence, as measured by the IBGE, is 0.41%; the lower poverty incidence limit is 6.00%, the upper limit is 6.00%, and the subjective poverty incidence is 9.79%. In 2010, Uberlândia's population consisted of 337,042 whites (55.801%); 50,271 blacks (8.323%); 208,945 pardos (34.593%); 6,796 Asians (1.125%); 926 indigenous (0.153%); and 33 undeclared (0.005%).

=== Religion ===
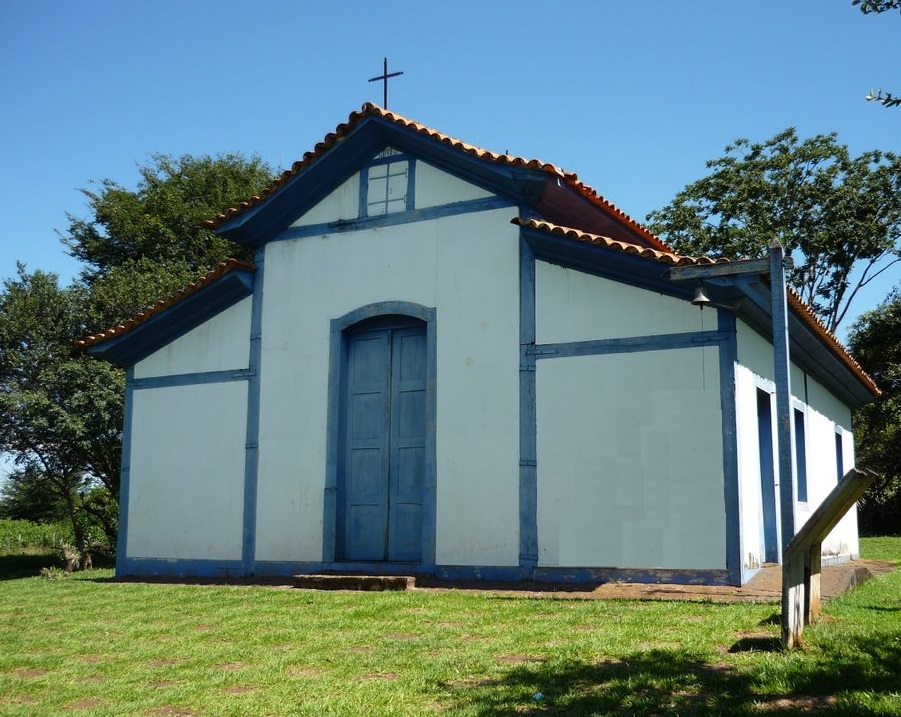
Church in the center of the Miraporanga district

The religious diversity found in Uberlândia is comparable to the cultural diversity present in the city. Although it developed on a predominantly Catholic social foundation, dozens of different Protestant denominations can now be found. Additionally, the growth of those without religion has been notable, reaching nearly 9% of the population.

Uberlândia is located in the country with the largest Catholic population in absolute numbers worldwide. The Catholic Church had its legal status recognized by the federal government in October 2009, although Brazil is currently an officially secular state. The city is home to a variety of Protestant or reformed denominations, such as the Assembly of God.

According to data from the census of 2010, conducted by the IBGE, Uberlândia's population is composed of: Catholics (54.58%), evangelicals (25.16%), people without religion (8.36%), Spiritists (7.4%), and 4.5% are divided among other religions. According to the 2022 Brazilian census, 48.49% of the city's population identified as Catholic, 28.54% as evangelical or Protestant, 5.98% as spiritist, 1.04% as practitioners of Umbanda or Candomblé, 0.01% as followers of traditional religions, 5.92% as followers of other religions, 9.85% as irreligious, 0.02% as other, and 0.15% as undeclared.

== Politics ==
=== Administration ===
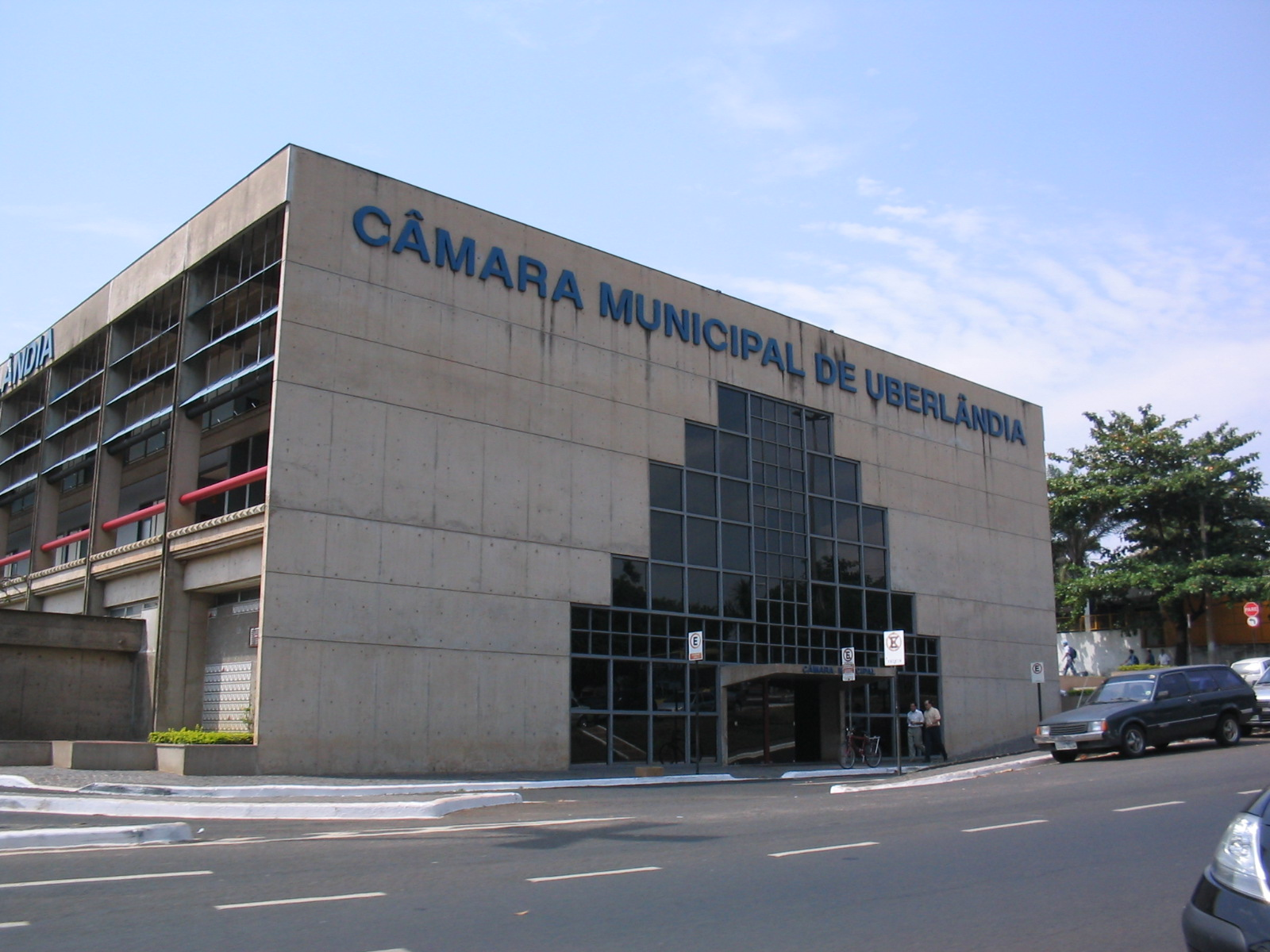
Headquarters of the Uberlândia Municipal Chamber, on João Naves de Ávila Avenue, in the Santa Mônica neighborhood, east zone of the city.

According to the 1988 Constitution, Uberlândia is part of a federal presidential constitutional republic. It was inspired by the American model; however, the Brazilian legal system follows the Roman-Germanic tradition of positive law. Municipal administration is carried out by the executive power and the legislative power.

Before 1930, municipalities were led by the presidents of municipal chambers, also called executive agents or intendants. Only after the 1930 Revolution were municipal powers separated into executive and legislative branches. The first intendant of the municipality was Antônio Alves dos Santos, and the first executive leader and mayor was Lúcio Libânio. Over twenty-nine terms, 25 mayors and ten executive agents have led Uberlândia’s city hall. In 2016, the mayor elected in the Brazilian municipal elections was Odelmo Leão, from the Progressive Party (PP), with 72.05% of the valid votes.

The legislative power is constituted by the municipal chamber, composed of 21 councilors elected for four-year terms (in accordance with Article 29 of the Constitution) and is structured as follows: four seats for the Progressive Party (PP); three seats for the Workers' Party (PT); three seats for the Brazilian Social Democracy Party (PSDB); two seats for the Democratic Labour Party (PDT); two seats for the Social Christian Party (PSC); one seat for the Brazilian Socialist Party (PSB); one for the Party of the Republic (PR); one for the Christian Social Democratic Party (PSDC); one for the Social Liberal Party (PSL); one for the Brazilian Democratic Movement Party (PMDB); one for the Democrats (DEM); and one for the Popular Socialist Party (PPS). The chamber is responsible for drafting and voting on fundamental laws for the administration and the Executive, particularly the participatory budget (Budget Guidelines Law). The municipality of Uberlândia is governed by organic laws. The city is also the seat of a judicial district. According to the TRE-MG (Minas Gerais Regional Electoral Court), the municipality had 373,744 voters in 2006.

=== Sister cities ===
The Sister Cities initiative, overseen by the International Relations Nucleus, aims to foster integration between the city and other municipalities, both nationally and internationally. Integration between municipalities is formalized through cooperation agreements to ensure the maintenance of peace among peoples, based on fraternity, happiness, friendship, and mutual respect between nations. Uberlândia's sister cities are:

- Rondonópolis, Brazil.
- Heze, China.

== Subdivisions ==
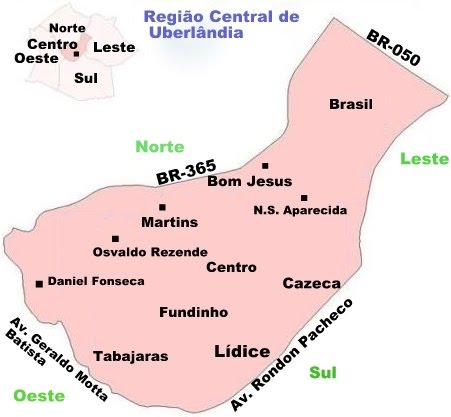
Map of neighborhoods in the central region of Uberlândia

When it was emancipated, Uberlândia consisted of only two districts: São Pedro de Uberabinha (seat) and Santa Maria (now Miraporanga), formalized by Provincial Law 3,643, of 31 August 1888, which declared Uberlândia's elevation to municipality status. It is currently officially subdivided into five districts: Cruzeiro dos Peixotos, Martinésia, Miraporanga, the Seat, and Tapuirama. The last district change was made under State Decree-Law 1,058, of 16 December 1943, when the districts of Tapuirama and Cruzeiro dos Peixotos were created and annexed to the municipality of Uberlândia.

The municipality is also divided into five regions, referred to by the city hall as sectors: Central Region, East Zone, West Zone, North Zone, and South Zone. The city is further subdivided into approximately 160 neighborhoods. However, to reduce this large number, the city hall has been implementing the "Integrated Neighborhoods" project since the 1980s, aiming to consolidate various neighborhoods through a detailed study of the current urban fabric. The goal is to reduce the number of neighborhoods to eighty.

== Economy ==
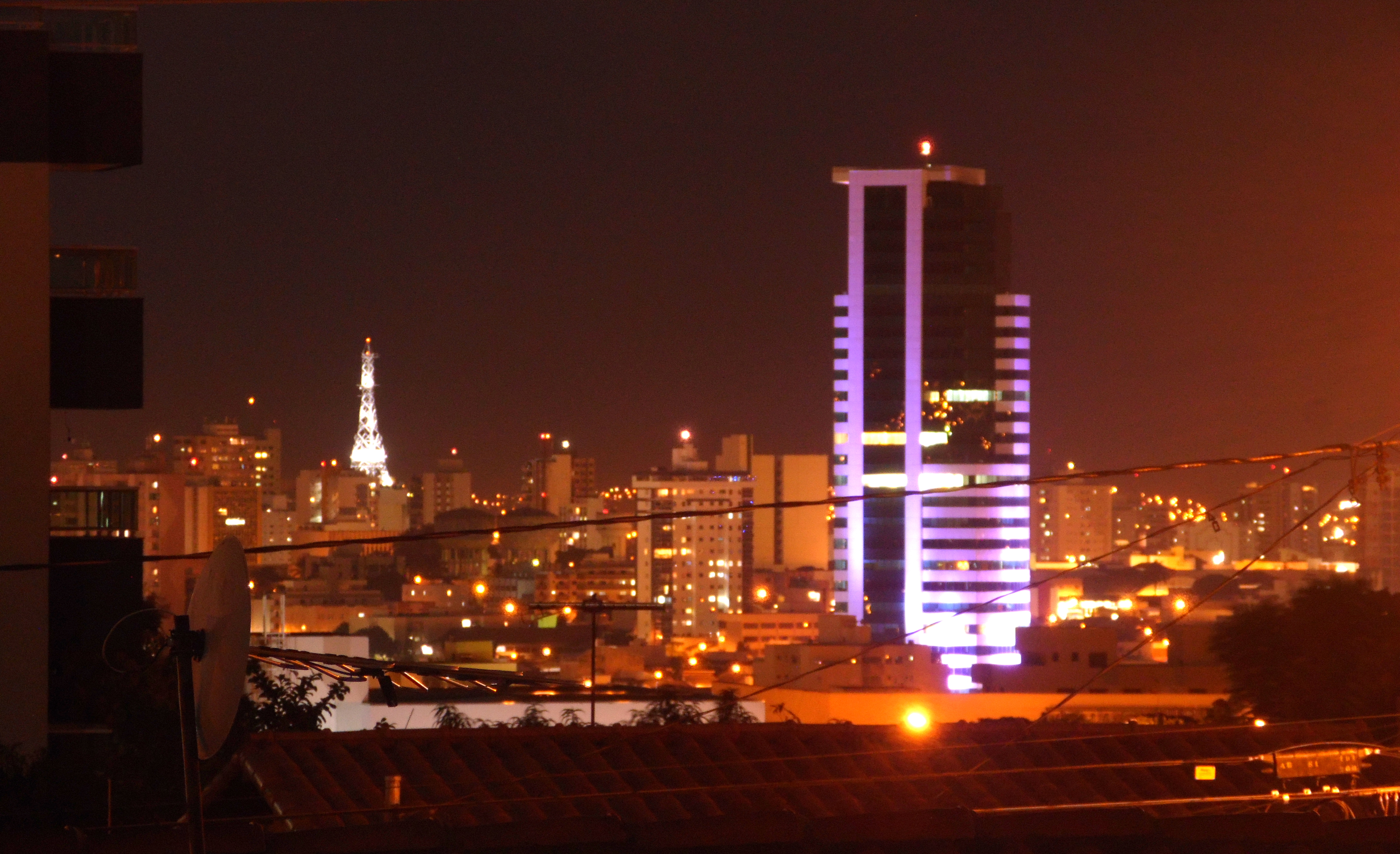
View of the UBT (Uberlândia Business Tower) and part of the central region of Uberlândia

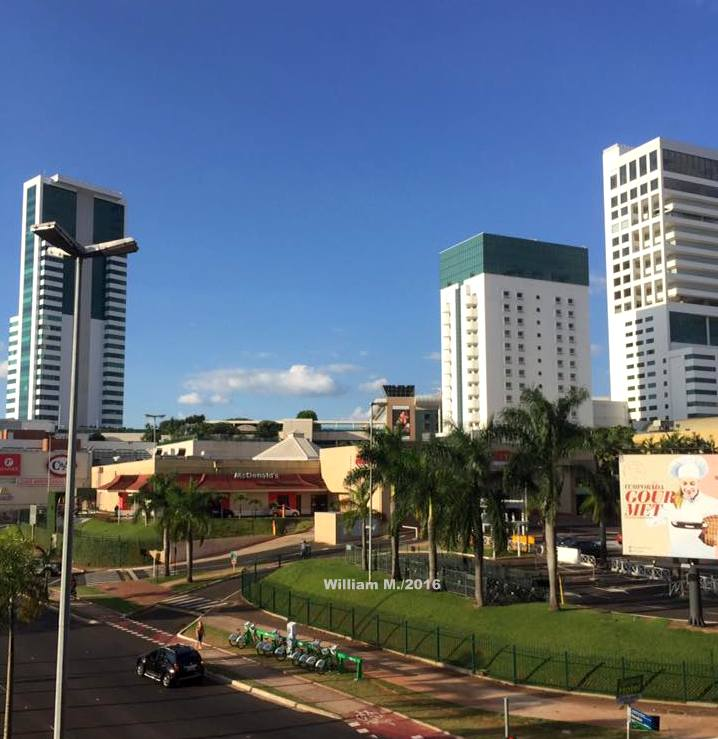
Center Shopping, the largest shopping complex in Uberlândia and the entire interior of Minas Gerais

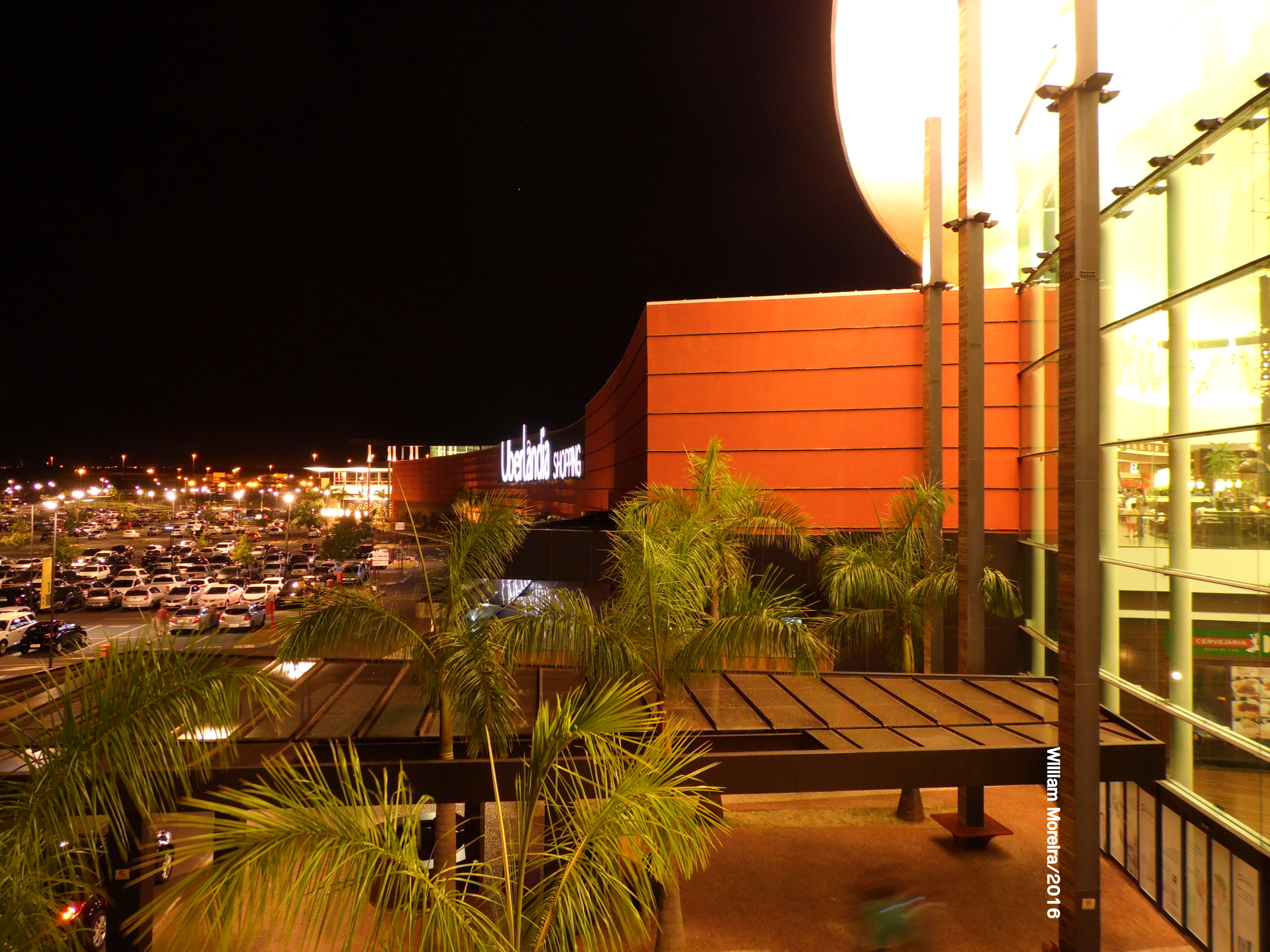
Uberlândia Shopping, the largest mall in the south zone and the second largest in the city

The gross domestic product (GDP) of Uberlândia is the 27th largest in Brazil, excelling in the area of service provision. According to IBGE data from 2008, the municipality had a GDP of 14,270,392,490 reais. Of this total, 2,003,554,000 reais are from taxes on products net of subsidies. The GDP per capita is R$22,926.50.

Agriculture is the least significant sector of Uberlândia's economy. Of the city's total GDP, 271,271,000 reais is the gross value added by agriculture. According to the IBGE, in 2008, the municipality had a herd of 205,709 cattle, 619,464 pigs, 6,169 horses, 762 goats, 78 buffalo, 319 donkeys, 541 mules, 4,633 sheep, 378 rabbits, and 5,798,617 poultry, including 2,480,000 chickens and 3,318,617 roosters, chicks, and pullets. In 2008, the city produced 48,900,000 liters of milk from 31,623 cows. It produced 50,068,000 dozen eggs and 1,400 kilograms of honey from bees. In terms of temporary crops, the main products are corn (140,400 tons), soybean (138,330 tons), and sugarcane (28,500 tons).

The industry is currently the second most significant sector for the economy of Uberlândia. R$2,729,956 of the municipal GDP come from the gross value added by industry (secondary sector). A significant portion of the municipal secondary sector’s contribution originates from the Guiomar de Freitas Costa Industrial District, located in the northern zone of the city. This district houses the main industries of the city, including facilities of some of Brazil’s largest companies and even multinationals, such as Cargill, Casas Bahia, Algar Telecom (formerly CTBC), Monsanto, Petrobras, Sadia, Souza Cruz, and Coca-Cola.

Uberlândia is also home to Ambev, which operates a distribution center in the western zone and a factory, designed to be the largest in the world, located in the rural area of the far southeastern part of the city.

R$7,479,038 of the municipal GDP come from service provision (tertiary sector). The tertiary sector is currently the largest contributor to Uberlândia’s GDP. According to the IBGE, in 2008, the city had 21,492 businesses and 339,922 workers, with 183,888 total employed personnel and 156,034 salaried employees. Salaries combined with other remunerations amounted to 2,358,463 reais, and the average monthly salary in the municipality was 2.9 minimum wages.

Uberlândia is home to some of the largest shopping centers in the Triângulo Mineiro region, such as Center Shopping and Pátio Sabiá in the Eastern Zone; Uberlândia Shopping, Pátio Vinhedos, Village Altamira, and Griff Shopping in the Southern Zone; and Pratic Shopping in the central region. As in the rest of the country, the peak sales period in Uberlândia is Christmas.

=== Business tourism ===
Uberlândia is part of the Triângulo Mineiro tourist circuit and stands out in the area of business tourism on a national scale and commercial tourism on a regional level. Recently, the city was ranked by the International Congress and Convention Association (ICCA), the leading organization in the international tourism and events sector, as one of the top Brazilian cities hosting international events, placing ninth. Among the top twelve cities, Uberlândia is the only non-capital city, surpassed only by major centers such as São Paulo, Rio de Janeiro, Belo Horizonte, and Brasília. Hundreds of events from various parts of the country and even from abroad are held in the city annually.

A study conducted by organizations revealed that tourism is the largest generator of job opportunities worldwide, with over 200 million jobs, and holds significant importance in GDP, directly impacting approximately 50 economic sectors. Among the segments, event tourism is considered the fastest-growing globally, generating US$4 trillion annually. In Uberlândia, 17% of the companies organizing events are large-scale, and in 82% of the events, the target audience consists of company employees.

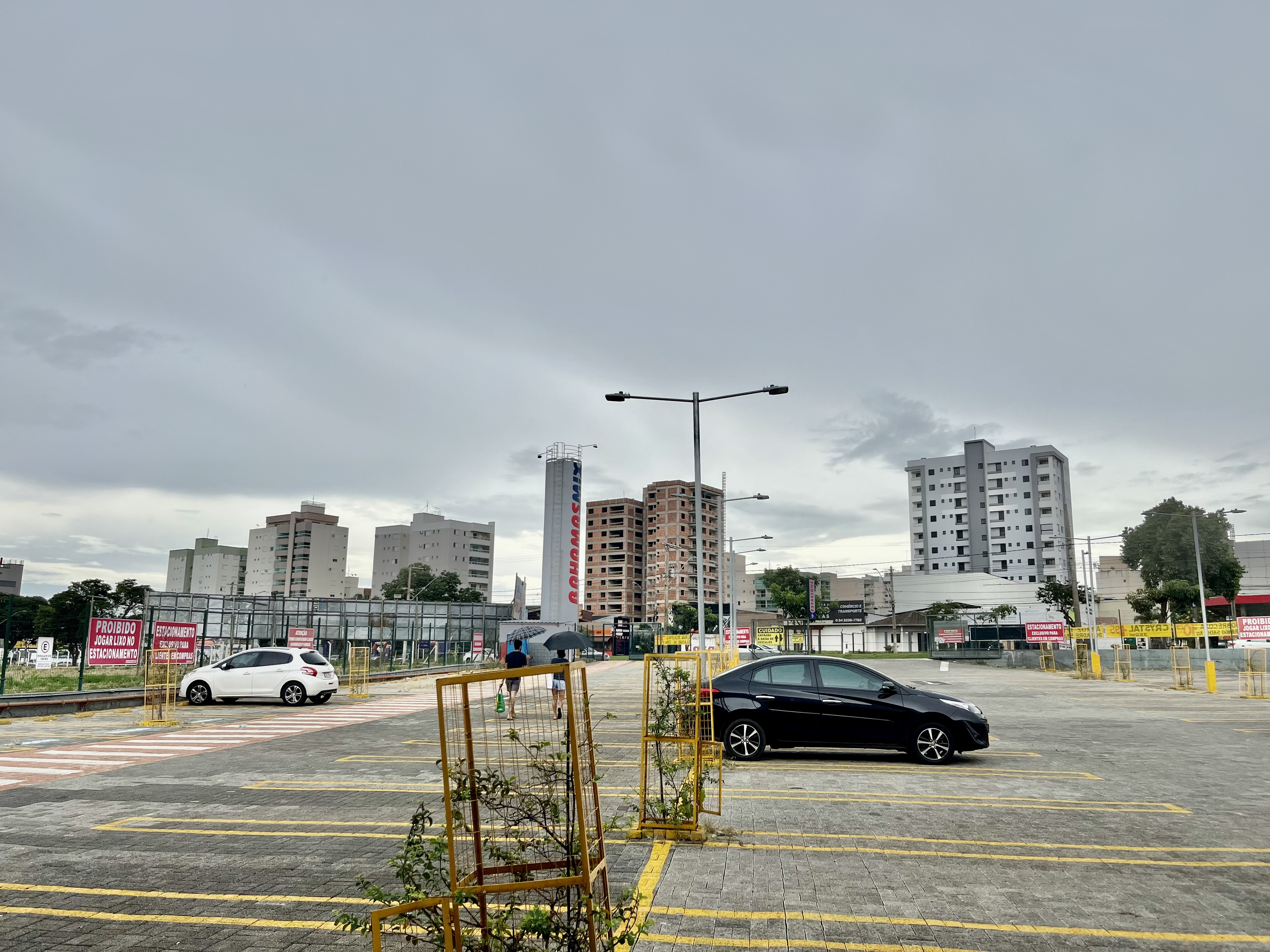
Part of the Jardim Finotti neighborhood, now integrated into the Santa Mônica neighborhood, in the Eastern Zone. Viewed from the Carajás neighborhood (Southern Zone).

== Urban structure ==
Uberlândia has a well-developed infrastructure. In 2000, the city had 144,461 dwellings, including apartments, houses, and rooms. Of these, 93,233 were owned properties, with 69,040 fully paid (47.79%), 24,193 under acquisition (16.75%), and 37,358 rented (25.86%); 13,507 properties were provided, with 2,599 by employers (1.80%) and 10,908 provided in other ways (7.55%). Another 363 were occupied in other forms (0.25%). The municipality has treated water, electricity, wastewater, urban cleaning, landline telephony, and mobile telephony. In 2000, 97.68% of households were served by the general water supply network; 97.38% of residences had waste collection; and 96.10% of residences had sanitary sewer systems. In 2009, the United Nations recognized Uberlândia as the first city in Brazil with fully accessible public transportation for people with disabilities.

=== Healthcare ===
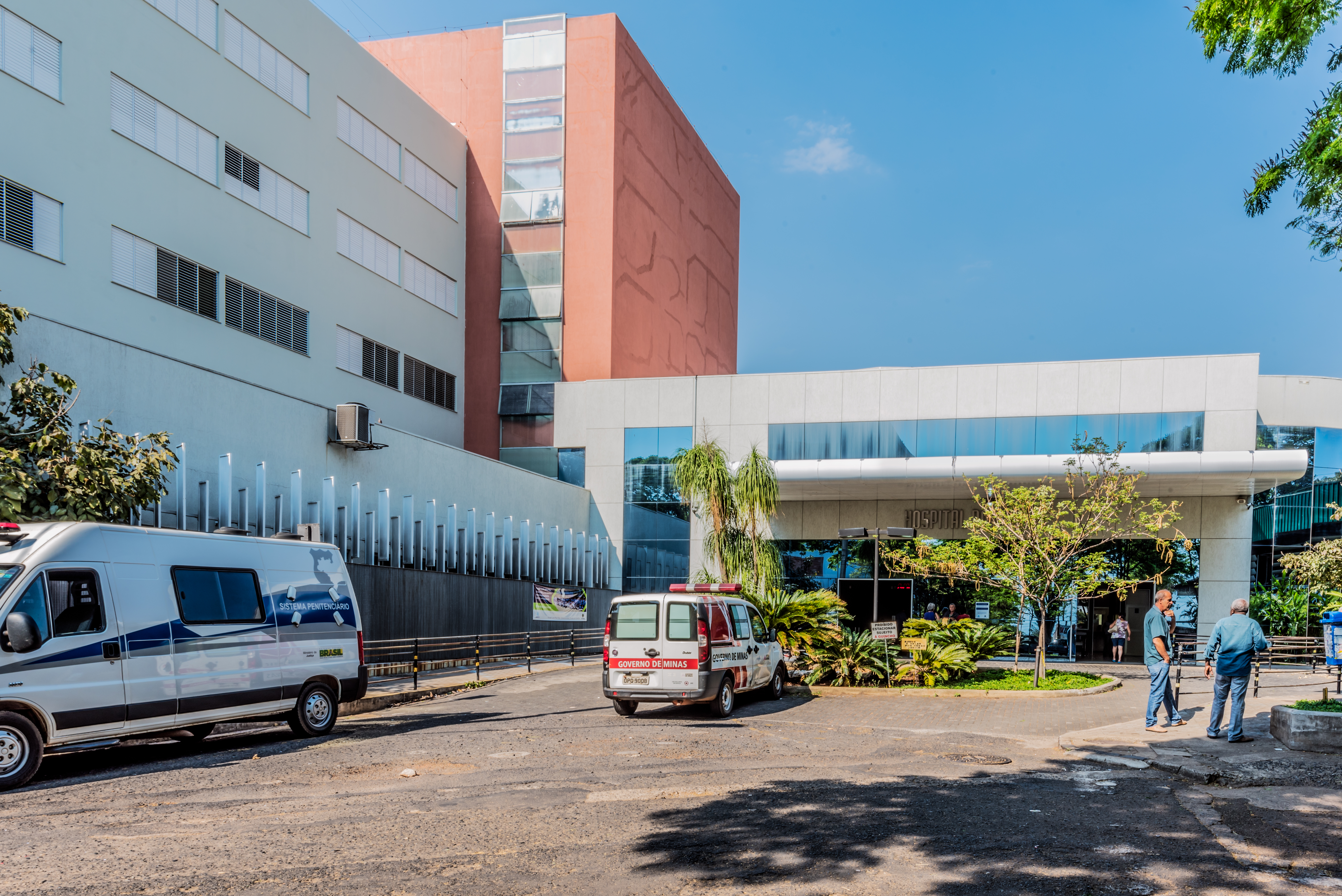
Cancer Hospital, at the Umuarama Campus of the Federal University of Uberlândia, in the Eastern Zone of the city.

According to the performance index of the Unified Health System (IDSUS), in 2010, Uberlândia had a score of 5.32, the fourth worst among similar cities, below the state average (5.87) and the national average (5.46). In 2005, the municipality had 198 health establishments, 64 private and 134 public, including hospitals, emergency rooms, health centers, and dental services. These facilities have 944 beds for hospitalization, with 420 private and 524 public. The city has twelve general hospitals, two public and ten philanthropic. Uberlândia also has 1,261 nursing technicians, 963 nursing assistants, 937 dentists, 885 general practitioners, 498 pediatricians, and 2,698 professionals in other categories, totaling 7,242 healthcare professionals. In 2008, 8,160 live births were recorded, with 10.2% premature, 88.2% delivered by caesarean section, and 15.5% to mothers aged 10 to 19 (0.7% aged 10 to 14). The crude birth rate is 13.1.

One of Uberlândia’s first public hospitals was the Santa Casa de Misericórdia, with its first board taking office on 1 January 1908. The city is considered a health reference for the Triângulo Mineiro, Alto Paranaíba, Noroeste de Minas, and Sul Goiano regions, with over a dozen hospitals, both private and public, such as the Hospital das Clínicas (SUS/UFU); Integrated Care Unit (UAIs) managed by Missão Sal da Terra and SPDM (São Paulo Association for the Development of Medicine), located in seven city neighborhoods, plus one UPA (Emergency Care Unit) in the southern zone (formerly UAI São Jorge); Hospital Santa Marta (surgeries and SUS care); Cancer Hospital (SUS). The city also has the Municipal Hospital and Maternity, also in the southern zone, with 258 beds for medium-complexity care, pediatrics, and maternity, including 40 individual ICU rooms and 12 neonatal ICUs, integrated into the Healthcare Network.

=== Education ===
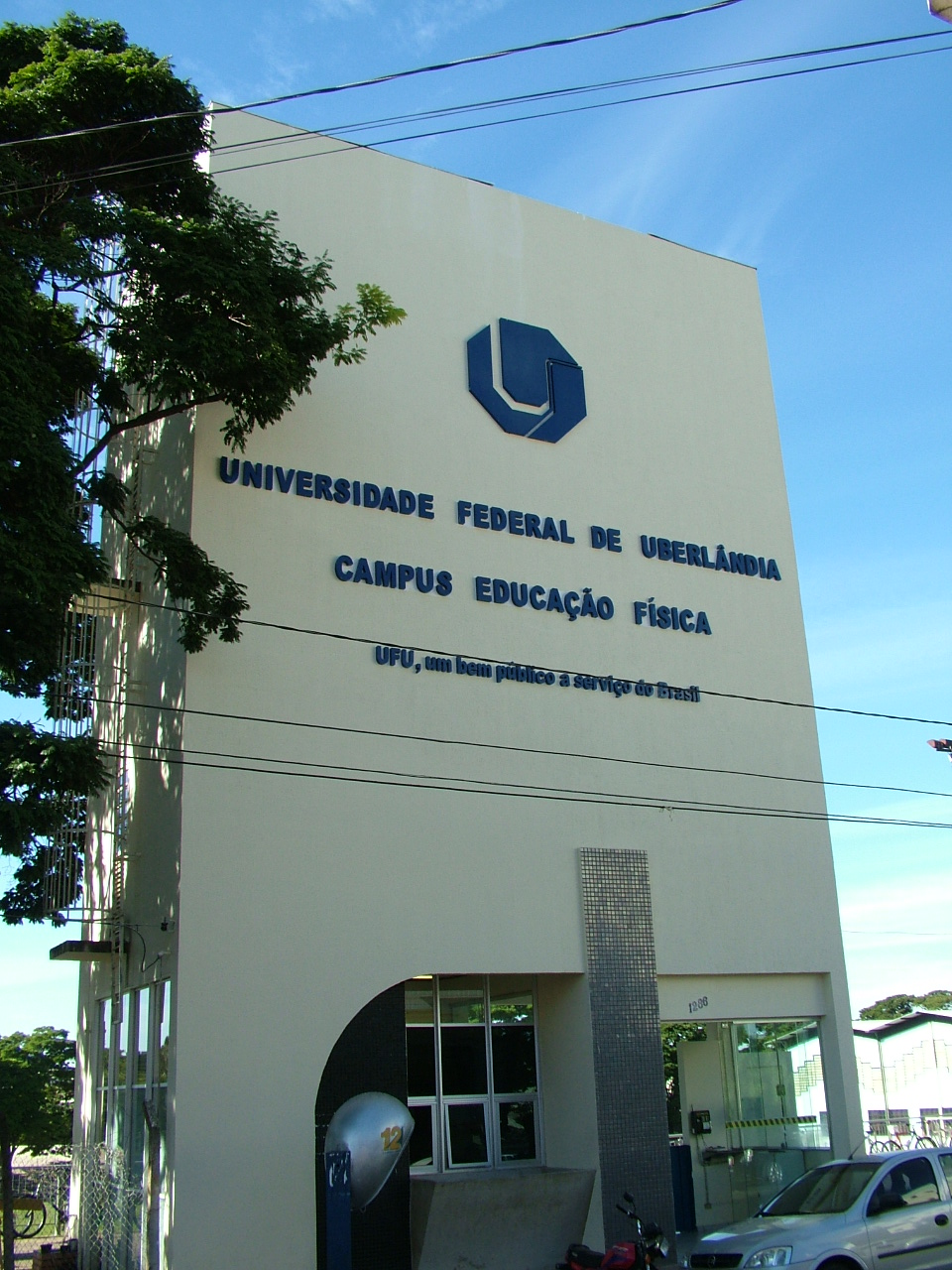
Physical Education Campus of the Federal University of Uberlândia

Uberlândia has schools in all regions of the municipality. Due to intense urbanization, the few residents in the rural area have easy access to schools in nearby urban neighborhoods. Education in municipal schools is of a lower level than in state schools, but the city hall is conducting studies to improve municipal public education to achieve better results in the IDEB. In 2008, the municipality had approximately 18,493 enrollments, 1,149 teachers, and 67 schools in the public and private networks. The first public school in the city was the Bueno Brandão State School, established by then-governor Júlio Bueno Brandão and authorized by decree-law no. 3200 20 June 1911. The school began operations on 1 February 1915 and celebrated its centennial on 20 June 2011.

In July 2015, the municipal network had 54 schools: The city also has several colleges and a federal university, the Federal University of Uberlândia (UFU), with a university population of approximately 50,000 students. It was initially authorized to operate on 14 August 1969, by decree-law no. 762 and became a federal university through Law no. 6,532 24 May 1978. Uberlândia also has a campus of the Federal Institute of the Triângulo Mineiro (formerly Agrotechnical School), located in the rural zone, offering technical and higher education courses semiannually. Additionally, it has one of the largest private universities in the state, Pitágoras College, represented by UNIMINAS.

Education in Uberlândia in numbers
| Level | Enrollments | Teachers | Schools (total) |
|---|---|---|---|
| Early childhood education | 11,885 | 907 | 158 |
| Primary education | 80,993 | 4,247 | 179 |
| Secondary education | 19,187 | 1,197 | 47 |

=== Crime and public safety ===
As in most medium and large Brazilian municipalities, crime is also a problem in Uberlândia. In 2006, the average homicide rate in the municipality was 18.2 per 100,000 inhabitants. The rate of fatalities by firearm, which was 4.6 in 2002, rose to 11.7 in 2003, reaching 12.4 in 2004, 10.0 in 2005, and 12.0 in 2006. Uberlândia also ranks 128th among the 256 Brazilian cities with populations over 100,000 that had the highest number of incidents involving the use, possession, and trafficking of drugs. In 2005, 213 such incidents were recorded in the city, resulting in an average of 36.4 per 100,000 residents. According to the Military Police of Minas Gerais State (PMMG), a significant portion of the murders in the city (78%) involve gangs competing in drug trafficking.

To address the municipality's high crime rates, the city hall is making significant investments in public safety, together with the Military Police. Between 2006 and 2009, the region received 245 police vehicles, and 984 personnel joined the Military Police. Efforts to combat drug trafficking were also strengthened. These investments have shown positive results. According to Gilmar Souza de Freitas, head of the 9th Integrated Public Safety Region (Risp), in 2005, 48,951 criminal incidents were recorded in the region, which decreased to 37,152 in 2009.

=== Services and communications ===
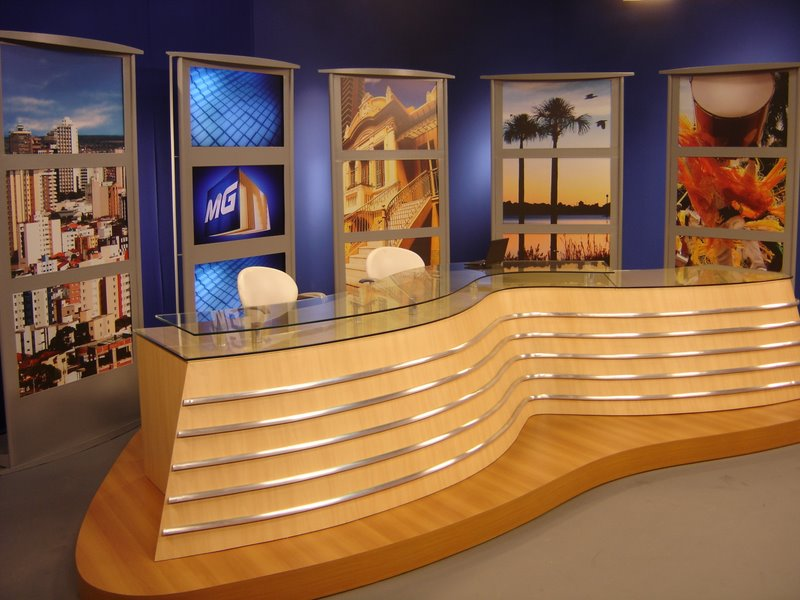
Former set of MGTV on TV Integração Uberlândia, in 2009

The water supply service for the entire city is provided by the Municipal Water and Sewage Department (DMAE). Safety and quality standards are based on the guidelines of the Ministry of Health. The quality of Uberlândia’s water is certified through the monthly analysis of 80 parameters conducted by the Bioagri Ambiental laboratory. Sewage collection is managed by the city hall itself. In 2012, the city was selected by the Trata Brasil Institute as a model for sanitation management. In the municipality, as in the entire state of Minas Gerais, the electricity supply is provided by Energy Company of Minas Gerais (Cemig). In 2003, there were 194,018 consumers, and 1,058,828,354 kWh of energy were consumed. The city also offers dial-up and broadband (ADSL) internet services provided by various free and paid ISPs. Mobile phone services are offered by several operators. The city is also covered by 3G and 4G mobile data connections. The area code (DDD) for Uberlândia is 034 and the postal code (CEP) ranges from 38.400-000 to 38.415-999. On 12 January 2009, the municipality began offering number portability to the Zona da Mata region, Campo das Vertentes, and other cities with the 16 area code (interior of São Paulo), 41 (Paraná), 34 and 35 (Minas Gerais), and 74 (Bahia). Number portability allows users to switch operators without changing their phone numbers.

The municipality also has several circulating newspapers. In 2004, there were four in total. Currently, the main ones are Correio de Uberlândia, Gazeta de Uberlândia, and Tudo Já. In 2013, there were more than six radio stations, according to the Associação Mineira de Rádio e TV and Telecomunicações de Minas Gerais S.A. Some of them include América AM 580, Cultura FM 95.1, Paranaíba FM 100.7, Clube FM 98.7, Rádio Mix FM 106.5, and Líder FM 93.1. The municipality also receives signals from various television stations. The first in the city was Rede Integração, formerly TV Triângulo. Since 16 March 2009, the city has been served by digital broadcasting.

=== Transportation ===
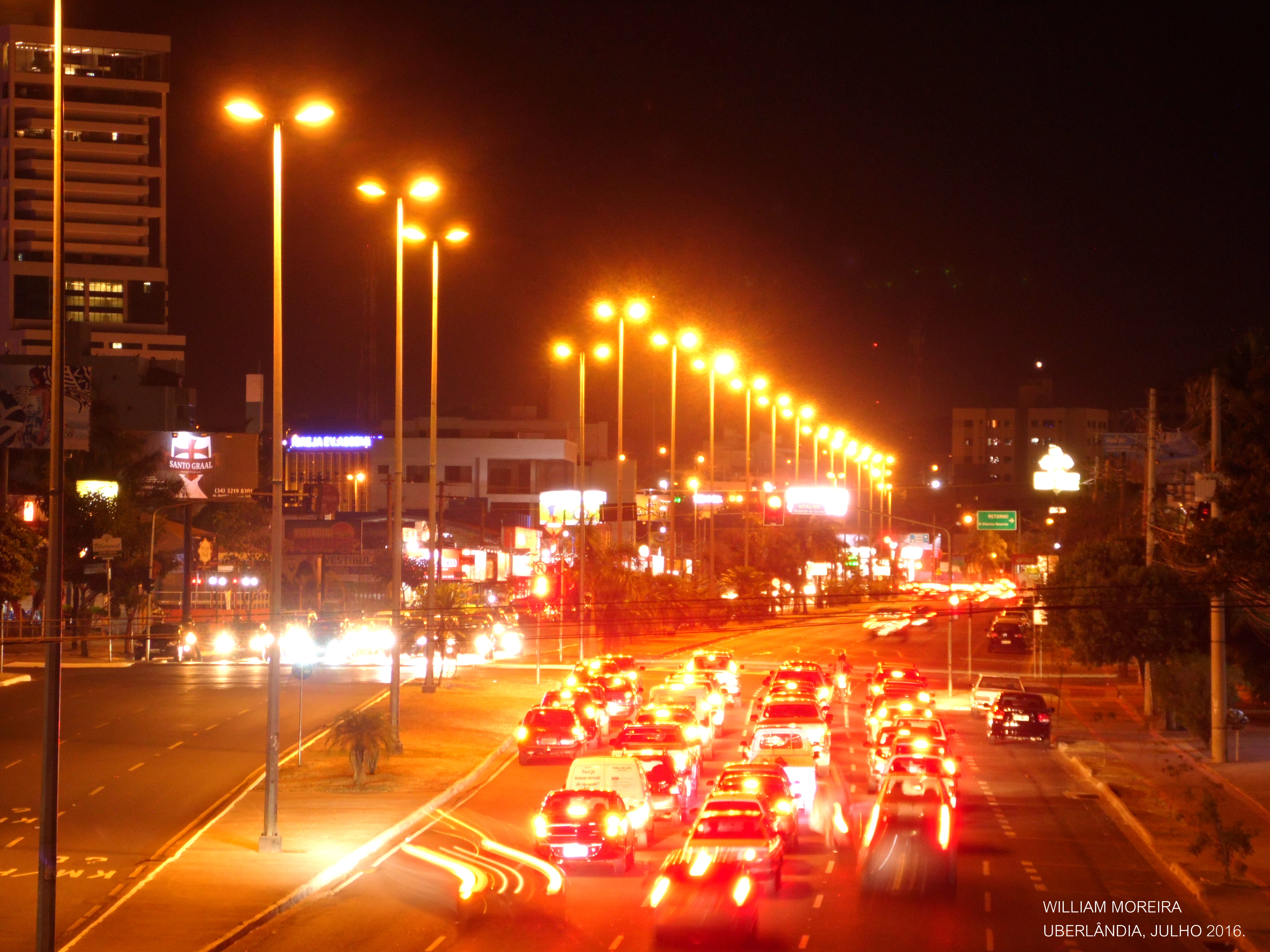
Rondon Pacheco Avenue, the main arterial road of the city of Uberlândia

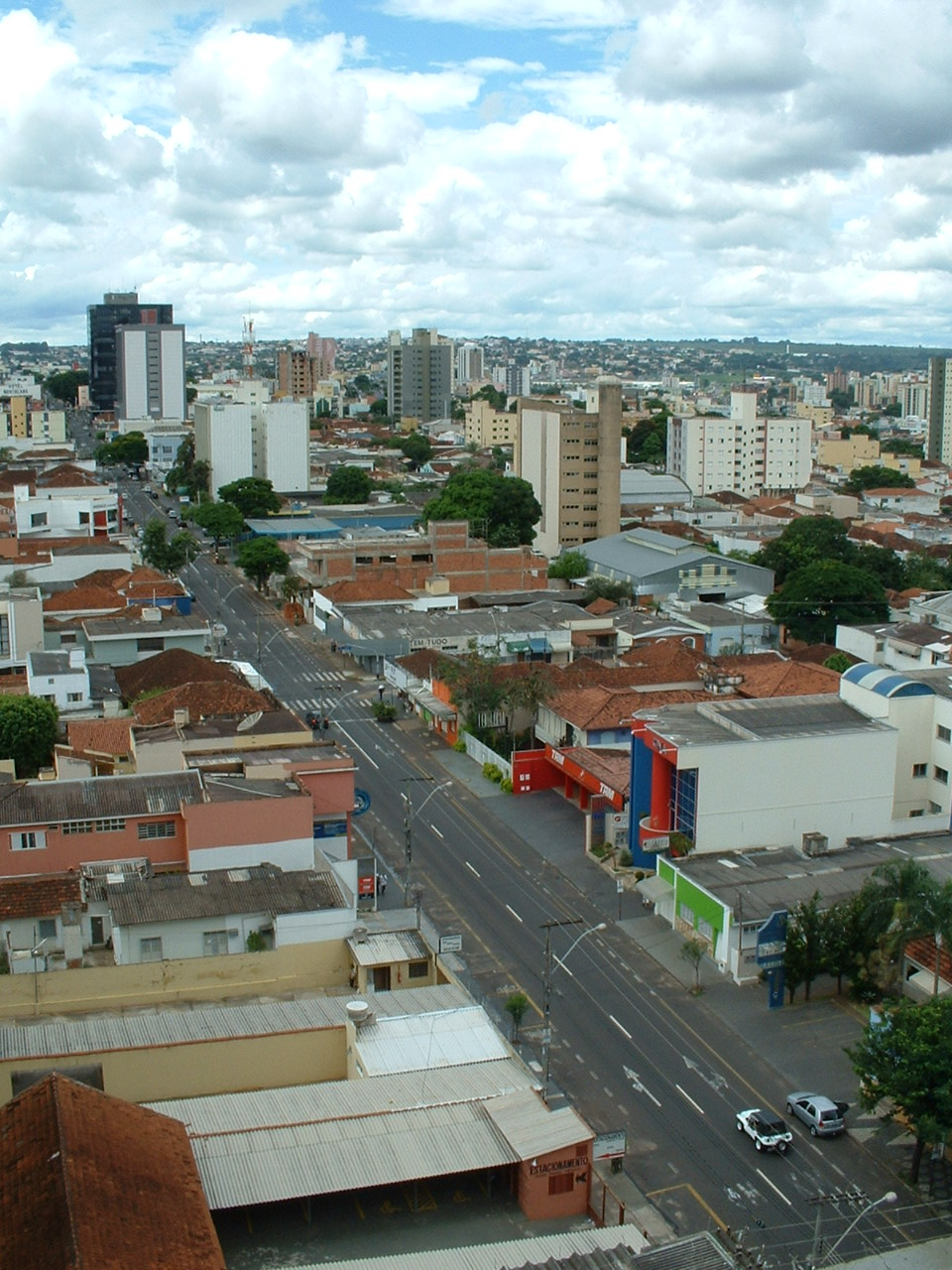
Cesário Alvim Avenue, an important thoroughfare in the city, crossing the Central Region and the Eastern Zone.

The bus system consists of five terminals strategically located in the main neighborhoods of the city, interconnected by express buses. In addition to express bus connections, which have no intermediate stops, the terminals are served by feeder buses that form the secondary branches of this mass transportation system. The city also has thirteen bus stations located at key points along João Naves de Ávila Avenue, connecting two terminals over a ten-kilometer route (this avenue also has express buses that do not stop at the stations), such as the E131 express line and the T131 stopping line, linking the Central Terminal to the Santa Luzia Terminal. The city recently welcomed three new transportation companies—São Miguel, Sorriso de Minas, and Auto Trans—with new buses. The city has twenty-six express and semi-express buses operating daily, transporting thousands of passengers through the Integrated Transportation System (SIT).

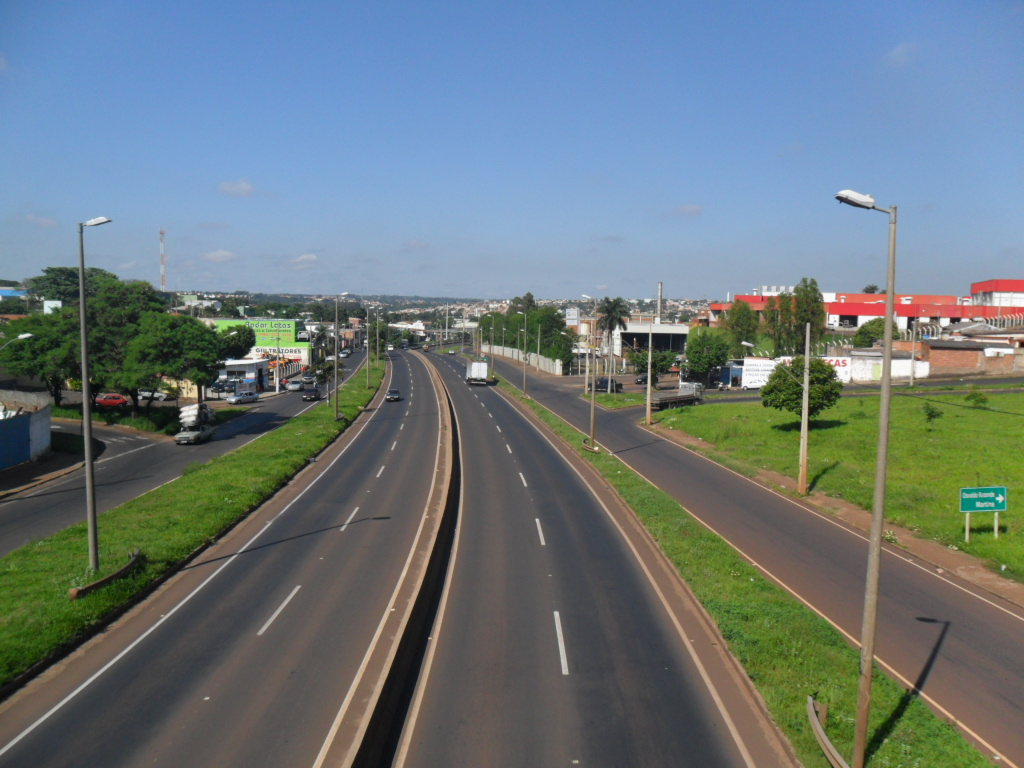
Section of BR-365 in Uberlândia

The municipal fleet in 2010 consisted of 291,318 vehicles, including 167,795 cars, 9,795 trucks, 2,935 tractor trucks, 16,781 pickups, 873 minibuses, 77,612 motorcycles, 13,951 scooters, 1,440 buses, and 136 wheeled tractors. Paved and expanded avenues, along with numerous traffic lights, facilitate city traffic, but the growth in the number of vehicles over the past ten years has led to increasingly slow traffic, especially in the municipal seat, where congestion on some major roads can reach 2.5 km. Additionally, finding parking spaces in the commercial center has become challenging, causing some losses to commerce. The Department of Traffic and Transportation (SETTRAN) is the municipal agency responsible for the city’s traffic and transportation system. It regulates and oversees the public transportation system, manages traffic, and, through its Traffic Agents, issues citations to drivers who commit traffic violations. The municipality has easy access to the BR-050 highway to Uberaba and São Paulo to the south (expanded to São Paulo) and Araguari, Catalão/GO, and Brasília/DF to the north; BR-267 to Porto Murtinho/MS; BR-365 to Ituiutaba, Patrocínio, Patos de Minas, Pirapora, and Montes Claros; BR-452 to Rio Verde/GO, Itumbiara/GO, Araxá, and Belo Horizonte; and BR-497 to Prata, Campina Verde, and Iturama. Additionally, it has access to state and national highways through paved, dual-lane secondary roads.

The city also had two historic railway stations: Uberabinha Station (in the urban area) and Sobradinho (in the rural area), the latter designated as a Municipal Historical Heritage Site by Decree no. 10,228 31 March 2006. Currently, the only active station is the Uberlândia Railway Station (also in the urban area), used for freight trains. All stations belonged to the Mogiana Railway Company, which played a significant role in the municipality’s growth in the regional and national markets. However, after the decline of coffee in the Triângulo Mineiro region and the rise of road transportation, passenger rail transport faced a collapse and strong competition, forcing companies to improve their services. In the early 1970s, the Mogiana lines were absorbed by the São Paulo state-owned FEPASA, including the Catalão Line and the Ômega-Araguari Branch Line, which, interconnected, cross Uberlândia and connect it to Araguari and Uberaba. Passenger rail transport ceased in the city in 1997, still under FEPASA’s management, and the following year, both lines were privatized for freight transport, currently under the concession of Ferrovia Centro-Atlântica.

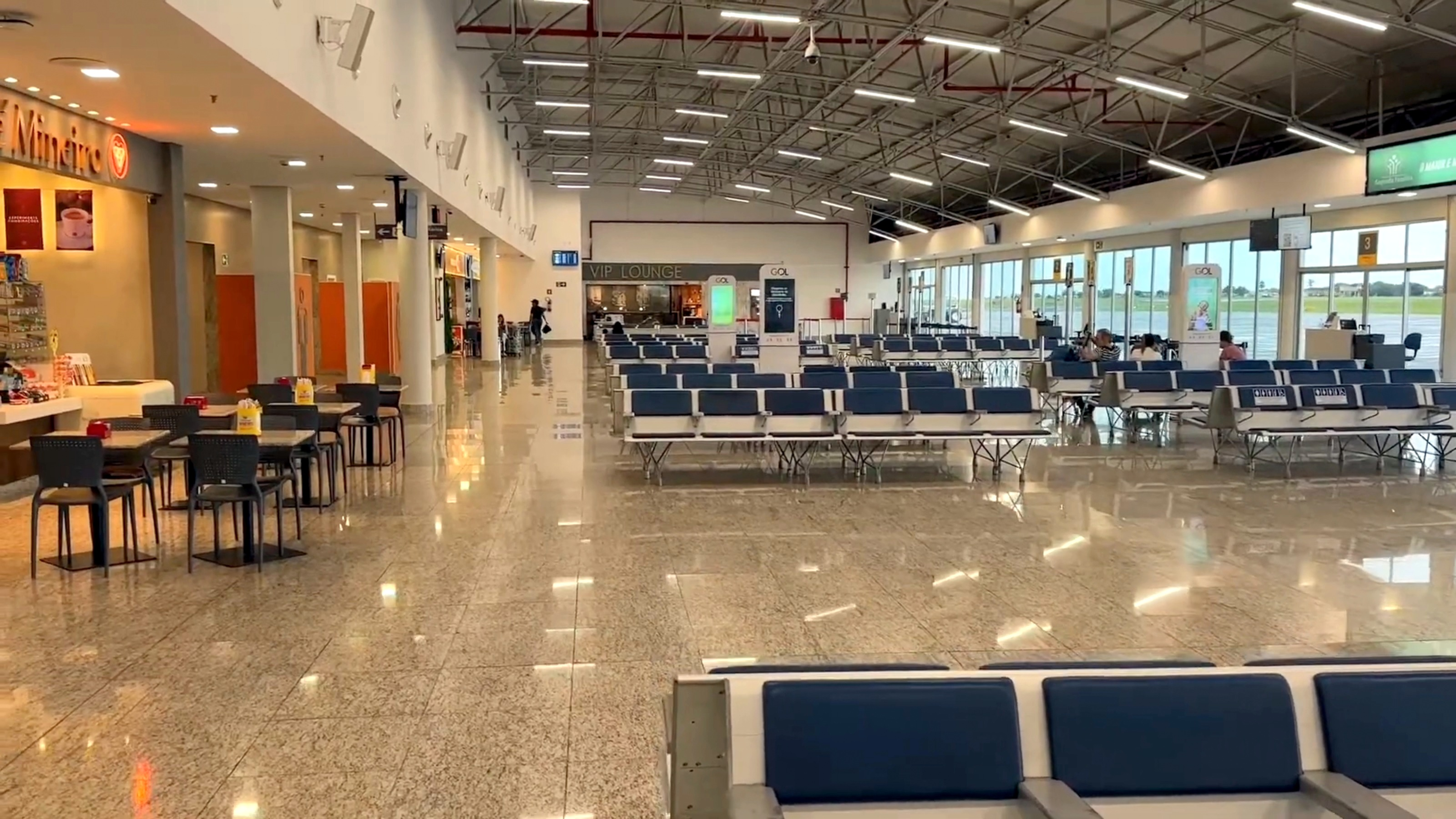
View from the boarding area of Uberlândia Airport.

Uberlândia is home to the Tenente Coronel Aviador César Bombonato Airport, commonly known as Uberlândia Airport. It is the third largest airport in Minas Gerais and the 27th in Brazil in terms of passenger traffic, with the capacity to handle over 600,000 passengers annually and accommodate larger aircraft such as the Airbus A320 and Boeing 737 after renovations in 2005. The airport recorded 907,169 passengers in 2011 and surpassed 1 million in 2012. The airport operates direct flights to only four Brazilian cities: Belo Horizonte, Campinas, Guarulhos, and São Paulo. It is served by several companies, including LATAM, Gol Linhas Aéreas, and Azul Brazilian Airlines.

== Culture and leisure ==
=== Cultural spaces ===
The city boasts a rich cultural heritage, with 19 properties listed as heritage sites. Among them are Tubal Vilela Square, designated as a Municipal Historical Heritage Site by Decree no. 9,676 22 November 2004, part of urban planning projects from the late 19th century aimed at building a modern city; Nossa Senhora do Rosário Church, listed under Law no. 4,263 9 December 1985, known as the oldest religious building in Uberlândia’s urban area, with construction beginning in 1893; and Espírito Santo do Cerrado Church, registered under Municipal Law no. 5,207 27 February 1991, designed in 1975 by architect Lina Bo Bardi at the request of Friar Egydio Parisi and Friar Fúlvio, among others.

The Uberlândia Municipal Museum is located in the city center at Clarimundo Carneiro Square. It once served as City Hall and housed the Municipal Chamber. It has been completely renovated and now hosts important artworks and cultural projects.

=== Events ===
The city also organizes numerous festivals and events, often held in public spaces. One of the most traditional events is Carnival, which originally featured a variety of music, including waltzes, mazurkas, and schottisches. The main attraction, however, was catira. Today, in addition to club balls, the municipality is home to four samba schools—Tabajara, Acadêmicos do Samba, Garotos do Samba, and Unidos do Chatão—as well as the "Axé" and "Unidos de São Gabriel" carnival blocks, which hold the street carnival in Uberlândia. The June Festivals, which are celebrated throughout June in honor of three saints, are also noteworthy: St. Anthony on the 13th, St. John the Baptist on the 24th, and St. Peter on the 29th. In the city, the June Festivals increasingly extend into July, known as July Festivals. Grilled foods such as sweet potato and cashew nut, as well as traditional June festival foods derived mainly from corn, peanut, and cassava, are consumed. Another notable tradition is the "Congado de Uberlândia." During the time of slavery, a group of enslaved Black people gathered in the woods to sing and dance in honor of their patron saint, Our Lady of the Rosary. Around 1874, the Congado movement began in Uberlândia. Over time, they felt the need to hold the Congado Festival in the city. The Black community arrived in ox carts and gathered under a large tree, where Tubal Vilela Square now stands. They then followed a trail to the Nossa Senhora do Rosário Chapel, built with wattle and daub and moriche palm, located at what is now Doutor Duarte Square, where they held the festival. This chapel was constructed around 1880.

The Carnival, in addition to club balls, includes four samba schools and blocks that perform street Carnival in the city. Another significant cultural highlight is the recent world record for the largest number of viola players, achieved by the municipality on 28 October 2017, at Arena Sabiazinho, with 674 viola players performing simultaneously, reaffirming a tradition in sertanejo music inherited from great names. The municipality also stands out in business tourism on a national scale.

=== Cuisine ===
The cuisine of Uberlândia follows the typical patterns of the Cerrado region. Notable dishes include rice with pork, galinhada, pequi sauce, green papaya sauce, guariroba, pumpkin sprouts, chicken with brown sauce, and green corn angu, seasoned with saffron, annatto, or pepper. These are often made with natural products found in the region. Typical regional sweets include papaya wood sweets, cashew sweets, ambrosia, ameixa de queijo, mocotó jelly, and others served with fresh cheese and rustic requeijão.

=== Sports ===
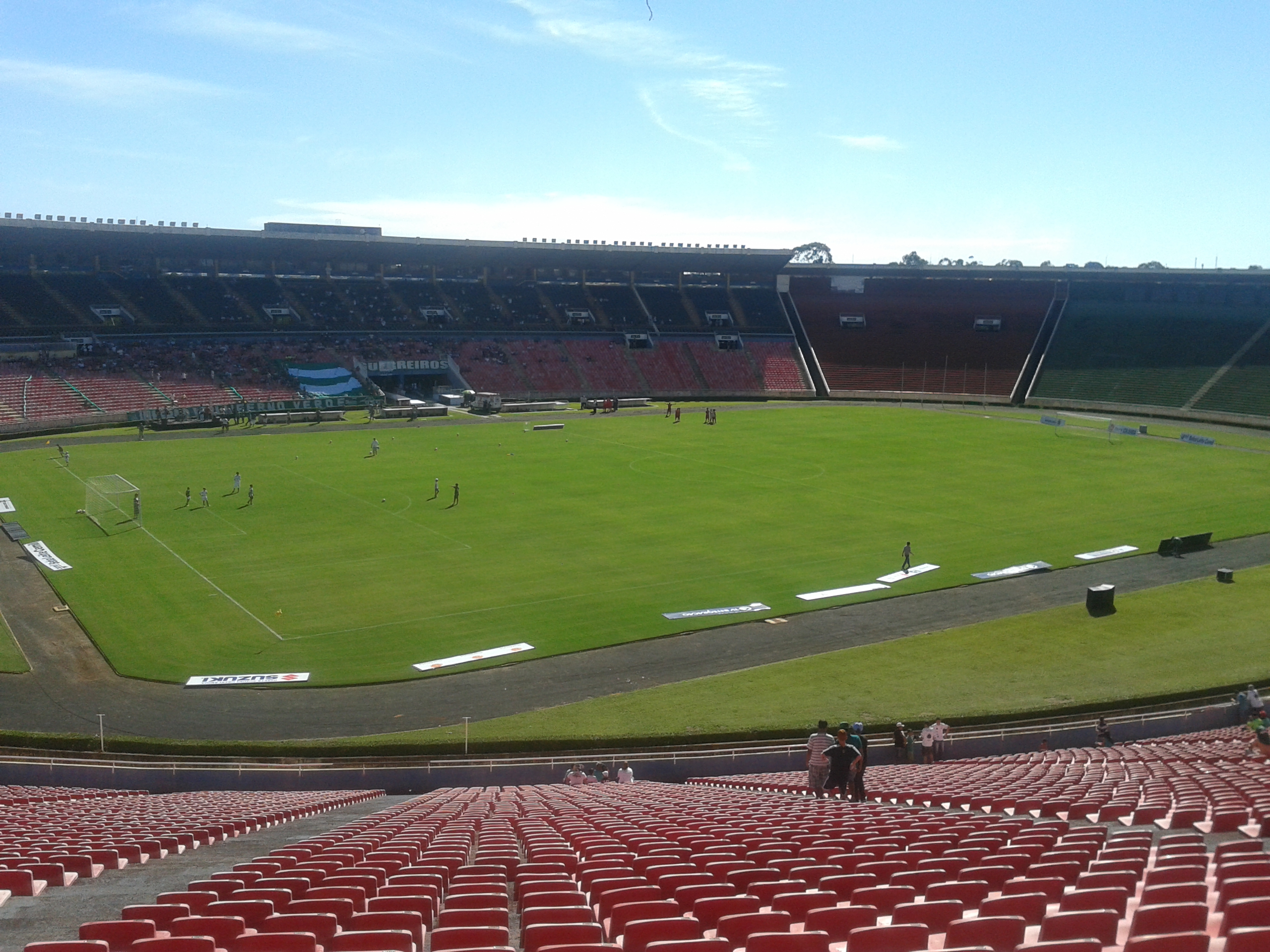
Estádio Parque do Sabiá, in the Virgílio Galassi Complex, Eastern Zone of Uberlândia.

As in much of the country, the most popular sport in Uberlândia is football. The main club in the city is Uberlândia Esporte Clube, founded on 1 November 1922. It plays its matches at the Estádio Parque do Sabiá, established on 27 May 1982, with a current capacity of up to 53,350 people. However, the record attendance was for a friendly match between Brazil and Ireland, which ended with a score of 7-0. It was the first game held there, with an estimated audience of 75,000 people.

The municipality also excels in other sports such as basketball, volleyball, rugby, and individual sports. In basketball, for instance, it has Unitri/Uberlândia, a professional basketball team formed in August 1998 with the arrival of then-coach Ary Vidal. The team uses the Homero Santos Gymnasium and the Tancredo Neves Multi-Use Arena - Sabiazinho. The city also has the women’s volleyball team Praia Clube, which competes in the national league and plays at the Oranides Borges do Nascimento Gymnasium. The city also has rugby teams, notably Uberlândia Rugby Clube, founded on 28 February 2010; American football; inline hockey; futsal; and other teams in various sports.

The city government provides various sports programs in the municipality. In the so-called sports centers, 15,000 spots were offered for children and teenagers in the disciplines of volleyball, basketball, handball, futsal, swimming, soccer, karate, judo, and athletics. These sports centers promote access to activities for sports initiation and training, serving as leisure and recreation or as preparation for competitions. All centers are equipped with courts, soccer fields, locker rooms, restrooms, and other amenities conducive to community sports development. Classes are offered in volleyball, basketball, handball, futsal, swimming, soccer, karate, judo, track and field, and artistic gymnastics.

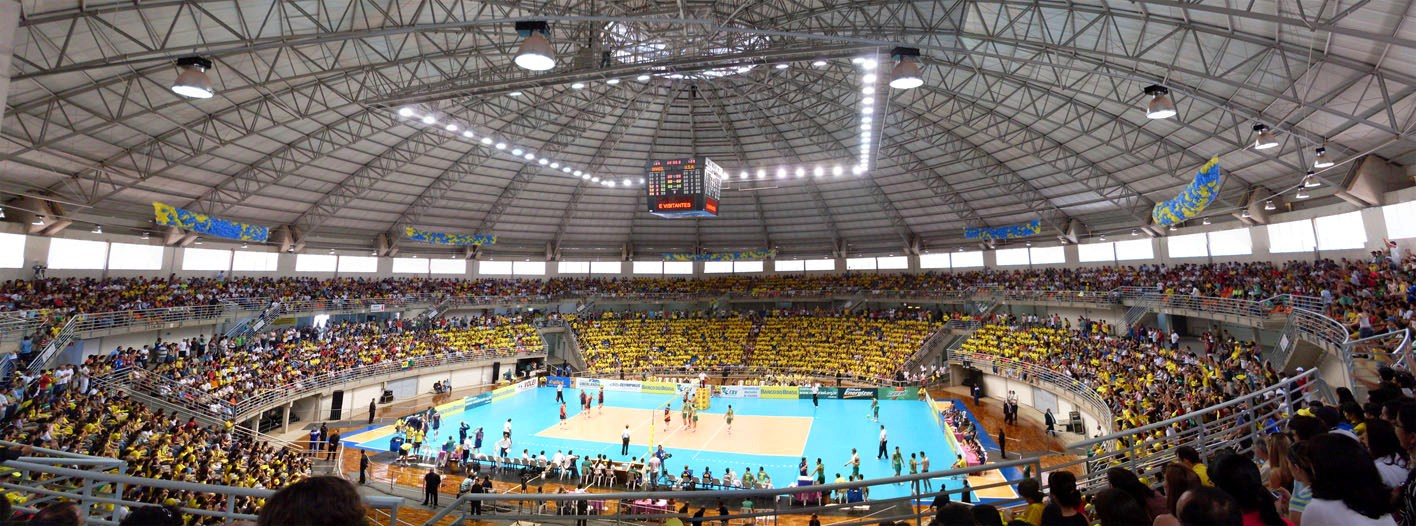
Tancredo Neves Arena, during a friendly match of the Brazil men's national volleyball team against the United States, on 25 September 2009.

=== Holidays ===
In Uberlândia, there are four municipal holidays, eight national holidays, and three optional holidays. The municipal holidays are: Good Friday, always celebrated in March or April; Corpus Christi, always held on the Thursday following Trinity Sunday; the day of Our Lady of the Abbey, on 15 August; and the anniversary of the municipality’s emancipation, together with the day of Saint Raymond, on 31 August. According to federal law No. 9,093 of 12 September 1995, municipalities may have a maximum of four municipal holidays, including Good Friday.

== Notable people ==
- Victor Caixeta

== See also ==
- Belo Horizonte
- Minas Gerais
- List of municipalities in Minas Gerais
- Diocese of Uberlândia
