= BR-365 (Brazil highway) =

Highway of Brazil

BR-365

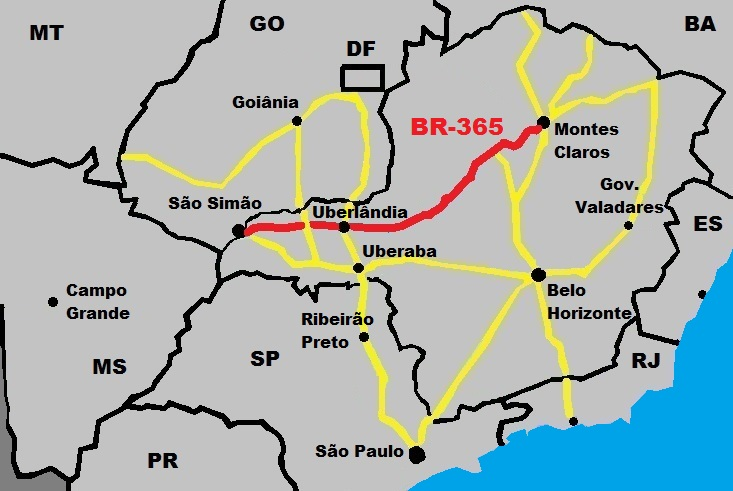
- BR-365

Route information
- Length: 878 km (546 mi)

Major junctions
- northeast end: Montes Claros, Minas Gerais
- BR-135 in Montes Claros, MG; BR-496 in Pirapora, MG; BR-040 in João Pinheiro, MG; BR-354 in Patos de Minas, MG; BR-050 in Uberlândia, MG; BR-153 in Monte Alegre de Minas, MG; BR-364 in Ituiutaba, MG
- southwest end: São Simão, Goiás

Location
- Country: Brazil

Highway system
- Highways in Brazil; Federal

BR-365 is a Brazilian federal highway that begins in Montes Claros, Minas Gerais and ends in São Simão in the state of Goiás.

== Duplications ==
The highway is duplicated in a few parts near Uberlândia. The stretch between Uberlândia and the junction with BR-153 was doubled between 2010 and 2020. In 2020, there was also a forecast to double between the junction with BR-153 and Ituiutaba.

== Economic importance ==
The BR-365 has its greatest economic importance through the flow of agricultural production from Minas Gerais. It also promotes regional and state integration, facilitates tourism to the beaches of Espírito Santo and the Northeast Region, among others. Via the BR-365, grain from the Center-West region travels to the Port of Santos, and the route is used to supply the southern region of Goiás and Minas Gerais, among others, with industry products, building materials and food.

== Gallery ==
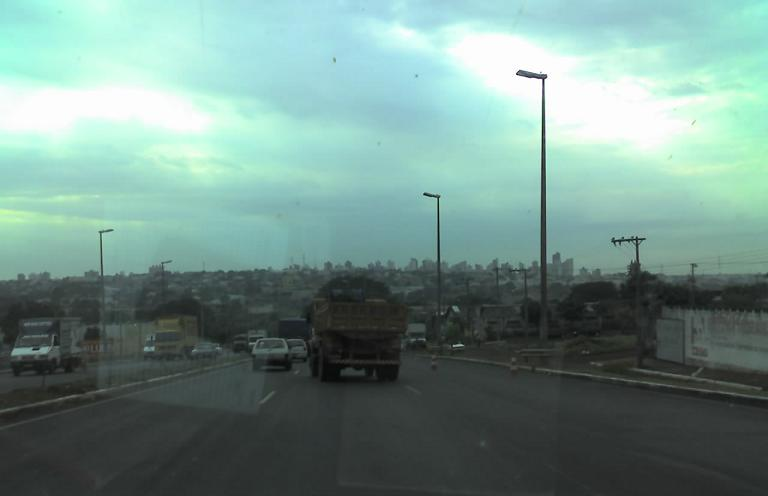
BR-365 in Uberlândia, 2008.
