= Frutal =

Municipality in Minas Gerais, Brazil

- Municipality
- Municipality of Frutal
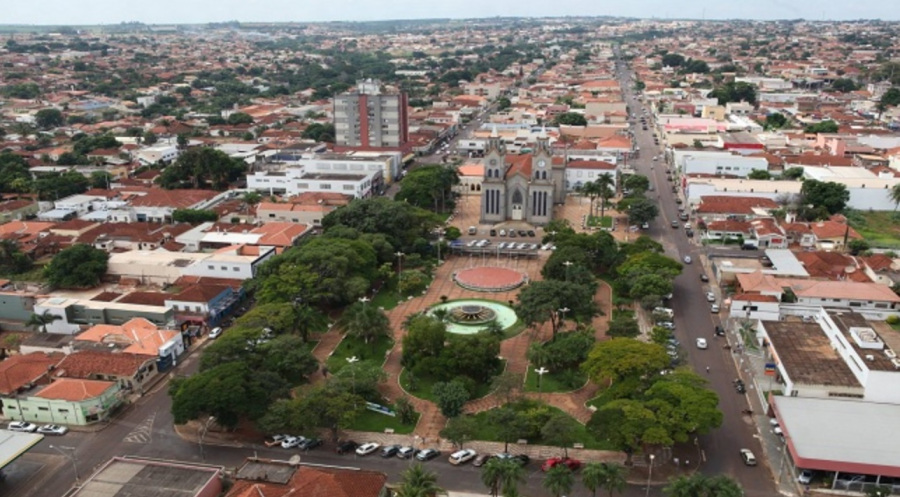
- View of central Frutal

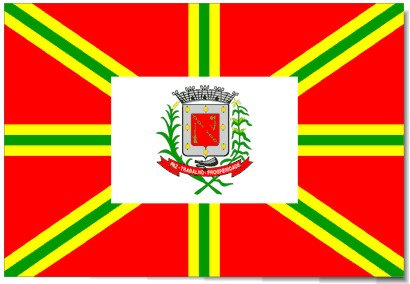
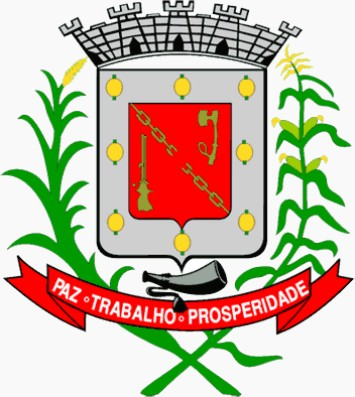
- Flag Coat of arms

- Location in Minas Gerais

- Location in Minas Gerais Location in Brazil
- Coordinates: 20°01′30″S 48°56′27″W
- Country: Brazil
- Region: Southeast
- State: Minas Gerais
- Intermediate region: Uberaba
- Immediate region: Frutal
- Municipality created: 5 October 1885
- City status: 4 October 1887
- Municipality installed: 25 October 1888
- Districts: Frutal (seat) and Aparecida de Minas

Government
  - Mayor: Bruno Augusto de Jesus Ferreira (Republicans)
  - Term: 2025–2028

Area
  - Total: 2,426.965 km^{2} (937.056 sq mi)
- Elevation: 516 m (1,693 ft)

Population (2022 census)
  - Total: 58,588
  - Estimate (2025): 61,275
  - Density: 24.140/km^{2} (62.523/sq mi)
- Demonym: frutalense
- Time zone: UTC−3 (BRT)
- Area code: 34
- HDI (2010): 0.730 (high)
- GDP per capita (2023): R$68,730.26
- Website: www.frutal.mg.gov.br

Frutal is a municipality in western Minas Gerais, Brazil, in the Triângulo Mineiro region. It had a population of 58,588 in the 2022 census, with an estimated population of 61,275 in 2025, in an area of 2,426.965 km^{2} (937.056 sq mi). Frutal is located in the region known as the "Triângulo Mineiro".

== Geography ==
The municipal seat lies at an elevation of 516 metres, just north of the Grande River, a tributary of the Paraná River. It is 8 km east of federal highway BR-153 (Transbrasiliana). Neighboring municipalities are:

- Northwest: Itapagipe
- North: Comendador Gomes
- Northeast: Campo Florido
- West: Itapagipe
- East: Orindiúva, São Paulo
- Southwest: Orindiúva and Paulo de Faria, São Paulo
- South: Guaraci, São Paulo and Fronteira
- Southeast: Colômbia and Barretos, São Paulo

Distances

- Belo Horizonte: 600 km.
- Uberaba: 145 km.
- Uberlândia: 186 km.
- Planura: 32 km.

=== Microregion of Frutal ===
Frutal is the seat of a statistical microregion with 12 municipalities: Campina Verde, Carneirinho, Comendador Gomes, Fronteira, Frutal, Itapagipe, Iturama, Limeira do Oeste, Pirajuba, Planura, São Francisco de Sales, and União de Minas. In 2010 the population of this region was 179,512 inhabitants. The area is 16,840 km^{2}, with a population density of 10.66 inhabitants/km^{2}.

=== Climate ===
Climate data for Frutal (1981–2010)
| Month | Jan | Feb | Mar | Apr | May | Jun | Jul | Aug | Sep | Oct | Nov | Dec | Year |
|---|---|---|---|---|---|---|---|---|---|---|---|---|---|
| Mean daily maximum °C (°F) | 31.2 (88.2) | 31.8 (89.2) | 31.5 (88.7) | 31.5 (88.7) | 29.0 (84.2) | 29.0 (84.2) | 29.4 (84.9) | 31.7 (89.1) | 32.3 (90.1) | 33.1 (91.6) | 32.0 (89.6) | 31.4 (88.5) | 31.2 (88.2) |
| Daily mean °C (°F) | 25.6 (78.1) | 25.8 (78.4) | 25.5 (77.9) | 24.8 (76.6) | 22.0 (71.6) | 21.3 (70.3) | 21.4 (70.5) | 23.5 (74.3) | 24.9 (76.8) | 26.1 (79.0) | 25.8 (78.4) | 25.6 (78.1) | 24.4 (75.9) |
| Mean daily minimum °C (°F) | 21.6 (70.9) | 21.5 (70.7) | 21.2 (70.2) | 19.7 (67.5) | 16.6 (61.9) | 15.4 (59.7) | 15.3 (59.5) | 16.9 (62.4) | 19.1 (66.4) | 20.7 (69.3) | 21.0 (69.8) | 21.5 (70.7) | 19.2 (66.6) |
| Average precipitation mm (inches) | 325.1 (12.80) | 209.8 (8.26) | 209.8 (8.26) | 78.7 (3.10) | 38.6 (1.52) | 20.0 (0.79) | 9.4 (0.37) | 16.3 (0.64) | 65.4 (2.57) | 110.0 (4.33) | 157.8 (6.21) | 232.6 (9.16) | 1,473.5 (58.01) |
| Average precipitation days (≥ 1.0 mm) | 18 | 14 | 13 | 6 | 4 | 2 | 1 | 2 | 5 | 8 | 11 | 16 | 100 |
| Average relative humidity (%) | 78.6 | 76.0 | 76.0 | 69.1 | 67.9 | 64.4 | 58.8 | 52.4 | 57.4 | 62.3 | 69.0 | 76.5 | 67.4 |
Source: Instituto Nacional de Meteorologia

== Economic activities ==
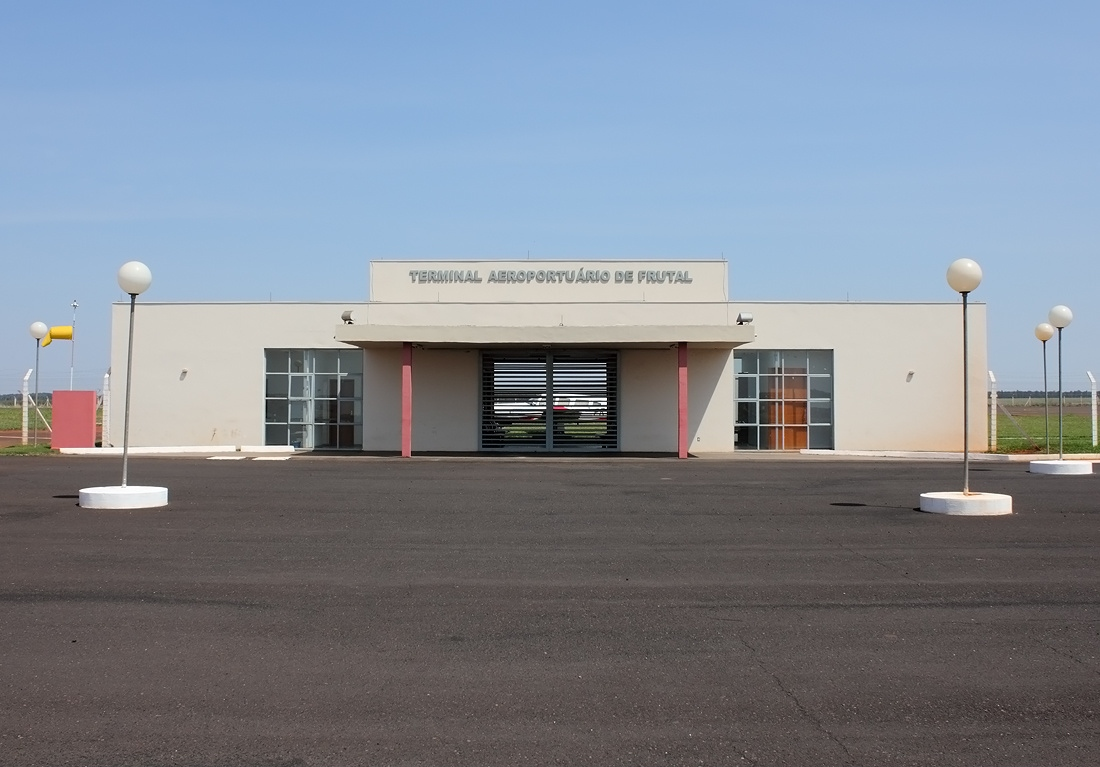
Airport Frutal (SNFU)

The most important economic activities are cattle raising, commerce, light industry, food processing, and agriculture. The GDP in 2008 was R$ 692,216,000. Frutal is in the top tier of municipalities in the state with regard to economic and social development. As of 2007 there were 06 banking agencies in the town. There was a dynamic retail infrastructure serving the surrounding area of cattle and agricultural lands. In the rural area there were 1,574 establishments occupying about 3,800 workers. 530 of the farms had tractors, a ratio of one in three. There were 10,726 automobiles in all of the municipality, about one for every 9 inhabitants.

Frutal is an important agricultural producer and a large producer of meat and dairy products. There were 157,000 heads of cattle in 2006, of which 53,000 head were dairy cows. The crops with a planted area of more than 100 hectares were:

- sugarcane: 10,128 ha.
- rubber: 628 ha.
- oranges: 6,500 ha.
- pineapple: 1,600 ha.
- corn: 5,000 ha.
- soybeans: 27,000 ha.
- sorghum: 5,000 ha.

== Health and education ==
In the health sector there were 04 hospitals with 133 beds and 10 public health clinics. In the educational sector there were 13 municipal, 06 state, and 06 private primary schools. There were 4 state and 3 private middle schools. In higher education there were three institutes: ITECON - Instituto Superior de Educação Continuada; UEMG - Universidade do Estado de Minas Gerais; FAF - Faculdade Frutal.

- Municipal Human Development Index: 0.803 (2000)
- State ranking: 32 out of 853 municipalities as of 2000
- National ranking: 495 out of 5,138 municipalities as of 2000
- Literacy rate: 91%
- Life expectancy: 74.7 (average of males and females)

The highest ranking municipality in Minas Gerais in 2000 was Poços de Caldas with 0.841, while the lowest was Setubinha with 0.568. Nationally the highest was São Caetano do Sul in São Paulo with 0.919, while the lowest was Setubinha. In more recent statistics (considering 5,507 municipalities) Manari in the state of Pernambuco has the lowest rating in the country—0,467—putting it in last place.

== Origin of the name and history ==
According to oral tradition the name of the city is linked to the abundance of a fruit similar to the jabuticaba, which was known by the first settlers as only "fruit". As a result, the place was called Patrimônio das Frutas, later as Carmo do Fructal and today only Frutal. The first registers mention the arrival of a pioneer Antônio de Paula e Silva in 1835, who settled with his family and slaves on the banks of the Rio Grande. In 1850 the settlement was declared a "arraial" or village, and in 1858 it was raised to the status of district in the municipality of Uberaba, becoming emancipated in the same year with the name of Carmo do Fructal. In 1887 it became a city with the name Frutal.

== See also ==
- List of municipalities in Minas Gerais
