= Immediate Geographic Region of Uberaba =

Urban administrative region in Minas Gerais, Brazil

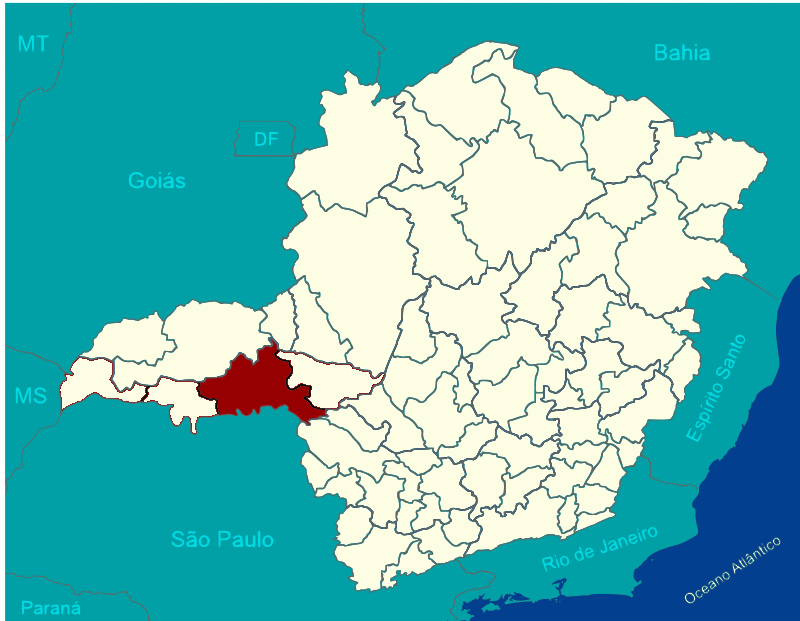
Immediate Geographic Region of Uberaba, in the state of Minas Gerais, Brazil.

The Immediate Geographic Region of Uberaba is one of the 4 immediate geographic regions in the Intermediate Geographic Region of Uberaba, one of the 70 immediate geographic regions in the Brazilian state of Minas Gerais and one of the 509 of Brazil, created by the National Institute of Geography and Statistics (IBGE) in 2017.

It is composed of 10 municipalities with a population of 458.608 people (2021) within an area of 14.281652 km^{2} (5.514177 sq mi).

== Municipalities ==
- Água Comprida
- Campo Florido
- Conceição das Alagoas
- Conquista
- Delta
- Nova Ponte
- Sacramento
- Santa Juliana
- Uberaba
- Veríssimo

== See also ==
- List of Intermediate and Immediate Geographic Regions of Minas Gerais
