= TV Integração Uberaba =

TV Integração Uberaba (ZYP 296)
- Uberlândia, Minas Gerais; Brazil
- Channels: Digital: 39; Virtual: 3
- Branding: TV Integração

Programming
- Affiliations: TV Globo

Ownership
- Owner: Grupo Integração; (SICOM - Sistema de Comunicações de Minas Gerais Ltda.)

History
- First air date: April 1, 2016
- Former call signs: ZYA 765 (2016-2018)
- Former channel number: 3 (VHF, 2016–2018)

Technical information
- Licensing authority: ANATEL
- ERP: 1.9 kW
- Transmitter coordinates: 19°45′18.8″S 47°54′18.9″W

Links
- Public license information: Profile
- Website: redeglobo.globo.com/mg/tvintegracao

TV Integração Uberaba (channel 3) is a Brazilian television station based in Uberaba, Minas Gerais serving as an affiliate of the TV Globo network for the southern end of the Triângulo Mineiro region, a panhandle in the western top of the state. Part of Rede Integração, the station covers thirteen municipalities.

== History ==
Rede Integração entered a public competition to operate a television station in Uberaba in April 1999, while on April 2, 2002, president of the republic Fernando Henrique Cardoso granted, through a decree published at Diário Oficial da União, VHF channel 3 for the station. Years later, on October 22, 2015, the station's license contract was signed with a length of 15 years, being published on Diário Oficial da União on October 27.

From this date on, preparations for the new station began. Uberaba until then was part of the coverage area of TV Integração Ituiutaba, founded in 1988, and had a subsidiary in Uberaba where its programs were produced since 1997. The subsidiary increased its capacities in order to accommodate the future station's image generation equipment.

TV Integração Uberaba started broadcasting in the early afternoon of April 1, 2016, during MGTV 1ª edição. The inauguration counted with the participation of Rede Integração's president, Tubal de Siqueira Silva, superintendent Rogério Nery and Uberaba mayor Paulo Piau, as well as Globo's actors and other personalities, to an audience of 300 guests. The station became the fifth of Rede Integração and Rede Globo's overall 119th affiliate, generating its programming to 13 municipalities, some of them formerly part of TV Integração Uberlândia and TV Integração Ituiutaba's coverage areas.

== Technical information ==
Channel	Res.	Content
3.1	1080i	TV Integração Uberaba/Globo's main schedule

Before its establishment, TV Integração Ituiutaba had a digital relay station on UHF channel 31, which started broadcasting on June 8, 2010. On April 1, 2016, the Ministry of Communications granted UHF channel 39 for the station's digital broadcasts, which entered a test phase a week before the station started. On April 1, 2016, the former relay station was switched off on VHF channel 11, while the new digital channel (39) went on air in tandem with the analog frequency on VHF channel 3.

Based on the federal decree envisioning the shutdown of analog TV, TV Integração Uberaba, as well as the other stations in Uberaba, shut down its analog signal on VHF channel 3 on December 5, 2018 (a little over two and a half years after opening), following the official ANATEL roadmap.

== Programming ==
In addition to relaying Globo's national programming, currently TV Integração Uberaba produces and airs the following programs:

- Integração Notícia: news, with Bárbara Siviero;
- MGTV 1.ª edição: noon news, with Tatiane Ferreira;
- MGTV 2.ª Edição: evening news, Ticianna Mujalli;
- Notícia da Hora: news bulletin, seen during breaks;

Relayed from TV Integração Uberlândia

- Tô Indo: variety program, with Mário Freitas;
- Cê Viu?: variety program, with Cecília Ribeiro;
- MG Rural: agricultural news program, with Márcio Santos (produced at TV Integração Juiz de Fora)

The station also airs Bom Dia Minas, generated from TV Globo Minas in Belo Horizonte, as well as soccer matches with teams from the state, while most other matches are from teams from Rio de Janeiro, as well as Globo Esporte. TV Integração Uberaba fills its overnight schedule with local news programs, to comply with a law stipulating that 5% of its programming would consist of news and related programming, pre-empting Sessão Comédia na Madruga on weekdays, Corujão on Saturdays and Cinemaço on Sundays. The slot consists of extra editions of MGTV and repeats of other local productions, exclusive to its coverage area.

=== News operation ===
Before its creation, TV Integração Ituiutaba served the Uberaba region, and produced its newscasts locally since 1997. After the founding of TV Integração Uberaba, all of its programming was incorporated into the new station, while the Ituiutaba station simply started relaying TV Integração Uberlândia with insertion of local commercials.

== Relayers ==
- Água Comprida - 11 VHF / 9.1 virtual
- Conceição das Alagoas - 13 VHF
- Conquista - 14 UHF / 31 virtual
- Planura - 7 VHF
- Sacramento - 2 VHF / 30 virtual
