= TV Mundo Maior =

Brazilian Spiritist television network

- Country: Brazil
- Broadcast area: Nationwide
- Headquarters: Guarulhos, SP

Programming
- Picture format: 1080i HDTV

Ownership
- Owner: Fundação Espírita André Luiz

History
- Launched: 1 January 2006

Links
- Website: www.portalmundomaior.com.br

TV Mundo Maior (stylized in upper case) is a Brazilian Spiritist television network headquartered in Guarulhos, SP, owned by the André Luiz Spiritist Foundation (Fundação Espírita André Luiz). The channel broadcasts programs related to Spiritism and is available on satellite television, as well as an over-the-air retransmitter network.

== History ==
The André Luiz Spiritist Foundation started television production by assisting in Espiritismo Via Satélite in 2001, with assistance from SEDA in Salvador. The existing Spiritist program was produced by Alamar Régis and aired on Embratel's executive channel. In 2003, the foundation took over and renamed it as Boa Nova na TV, after its sister radio station, Rádio Boa Nova.

The station started broadcasting on 1 January 2006 with limited resources from a studio in São Paulo's Santana district, from small facilities which included a TV studio that was located inside a garage for one car, with the editing suite behind. The channel broadcast two hours of original programming each day, limited to three programs: talk show Nova Consciência, Vida Nova, about people who recovered from vices such as drugs, and Protagonistas, about the voluntary sector. The rest of the schedule was occupied by relays of Rede STV (Rede Sesc Senac de Televisão, renamed SescTV later in the year), by means of a partnership, which provided it with a direct simulcast of the channel. Gradually, the amount of in-house programs increased. After operating in test phase, the station made its official launch on 17 March, with a special event held at FEAL's auditorium in Guarulhos. Gradually, the amount of programs it produced increased.

Its early years were marked by strong improvisation where most of its programs being made without massive editing. Its programming largely consisted of cultural interest and self-help programming.

The first live broadcast only took place in 2007, coinciding with the fifth anniversary of the death of Chico Xavier. The agreement with SescTV was broken in 2008 for two reasons: one of the channel's staff noted that it aired a short film with "sensual content", as well as another short film two young men, at an overpass, discussed the beginning of their adult life, and decided to smoke a joint by tearing a page of the Bible; both of which would be seen negatively by its audience. This enabled the channel to deliver a 24-hour schedule. By early 2009, the channel had a staff of 39 (including interns and volunteers, though aiming to become a fully-professional operation over time), produced over 50 hours of new content per week and was eyeing the creation of a feature-length Spiritist film, at a time when Spiritist-themed movies and biopics were a trend in Brazilian cinema. It also aimed at lowering its age demographic: at the time, the average age of the channel's viewer ranged between ages 40-60, however its ambitions were targeting the 20-40 demographic, having attempted programs for viewers in their thirties. In June 2009, the channel produced a program from Frutal, adjacent to Uberaba, for the first time, which was a weekly program combining Spiritism with local news. The local relay station was set up at an improvised studio from the local partner.

On 7 November 2011, its physical capacity on satellite began to be shared with TV CEI, of the International Spiritist Council (renamed FEB TV in 2014, when control was handed to the Brazilian Spiritist Federation), with each part providing equal amounts of airtime: six hours of new content and six hours of repeats from each channel, totalling twelve hours each. The goal was to merge the two channels in early 2012. In November 2015, the partnership (by then, TV CEI was renamed FEB TV, of the Brazilian Spiritist Federation) was dissolved and the channel resumed 24-hour programming; part of the line-up was used to simulcast programs from Rádio Boa Nova to optimize resources.

In February 2012, it moved to its current premises at a two-floor building in Guarulhos.

On 1 April 2016, the station launched in Uberaba, city where Chico Xavier lived from the late 1950s up until his death in 2002 (replacing a relay of TV Integração Ituiutaba on channel 11; at the same time TV Integração Uberaba started on channel 3) and, in September, in Araraquara. It also received authorization to start over-the-air broadcasts in Juiz de Fora. On 16 October 2017, it started broadcasting to Araçatuba.

On 11 March 2022, the channel received authorization from ANATEL to migrate from C-band to Ku-band TVRO satellite. In early January 2024, it shut down operations on C-band satellite, causing its over-the-air relay station in Uberaba to be temporarily off air.
