= Campo Florido =

Town and municipality in the state of Minas Gerais, Brazil

Coordinates: 19°45′39″S 48°34′19″W

- Municipality
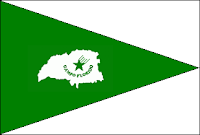
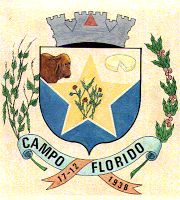
- Flag Coat of arms
- Interactive map of Campo Florido
- Country: Brazil
- State: Minas Gerais
- Region: Southeast
- Time zone: UTC−3 (BRT)

Location of Campo Florido

Campo Florido is a Brazilian municipality located in the west of the state of Minas Gerais. Its population as of 2020 was estimated to be 8,269 people living in a total area of 1,261 km^{2} (487 sq mi). The city belongs to the mesoregion of Triângulo Mineiro and Alto Paranaíba and to the micro-region of Uberaba. It became a municipality in 1938.

== Geography ==
Campo Florido is located at an elevation of 570 meters, 70 km. west of Uberaba. The distance to the state capital, Belo Horizonte, is 546 km. Neighboring municipalities are: Comendador Gomes (W), Prata (NW), Veríssimo (E), Conceição das Alagoas, (SE) Pirajuba (S), and Frutal (SW).

== Economy ==
The main economic activities are services, industry (especially brick making), and agriculture. There is an alcohol and sugar distilling plant—S/A USINA CORURIPE AÇÚCAR E ÁLCOOL, FILIAL CAMPO FLORIDO:, located 25 km. from the city center.

The GDP in 2005 was approximately R$155 million, with 36 million Reais from services, 35 million Reais from industry, and 73 million Reais from agriculture. There were 379 rural producers on 58,000 hectares of land. The land is very fertile and agricultural production is high. 98 farms had tractors (2006). Approximately 1,100 persons were dependent on agriculture. The main crops were sugarcane (18,000 hectares planted in 2006)) and soybeans (17,000 hectares planted in 2006), but oranges, cotton, rice, beans and corn were also grown. There were 70,000 head of cattle (2006). There were 2 banks (2007) and 810 automobiles, giving a ratio of 8 inhabitants per automobile.

== Health ==
There were 2 health clinics. Patients with more serious health conditions are transported to Uberaba, which is connected by good roads. Educational needs were met by 7 primary schools, 1 middle school, and 5 pre-primary schools.

== Statistics ==
- Municipal Human Development Index: 0.758 (2000)
- State ranking: 225 out of 853 municipalities as of 2000
- National ranking: 1,642 out of 5,138 municipalities as of 2000
- Literacy rate: 86%
- Life expectancy: 71 (average of males and females)

In 2000 the per capita monthly income of R$234.00 was below the state and national average of R$276.00 and R$297.00 respectively.

The highest ranking municipality in Minas Gerais in 2000 was Poços de Caldas with 0.841, while the lowest was Setubinha with 0.568. Nationally the highest was São Caetano do Sul in São Paulo with 0.919, while the lowest was Setubinha. In more recent statistics (considering 5,507 municipalities) Manari in the state of Pernambuco has the lowest rating in the country—0,467—putting it in last place.

== See also ==
- List of municipalities in Minas Gerais
