= TV Integração Ituiutaba =

TV Integração Ituiutaba (ZYA 737)
- Ituiutaba, Minas Gerais; Brazil
- Channels: Digital: 30; Virtual: 7
- Branding: TV Integração

Programming
- Affiliations: TV Globo

Ownership
- Owner: Grupo Integração; (SICOM - Sistema de Comunicações de Minas Gerais Ltda.)

History
- First air date: 1989
- Former names: TV Pontal (1989–1995); TV Ideal (1995–2003)
- Former channel number: 7 (VHF, 1989–2023)

Technical information
- Licensing authority: ANATEL
- ERP: 1.5 kW
- Transmitter coordinates: 18°59′34.7″S 49°27′24.4″W

Links
- Public license information: Profile
- Website: redeglobo.globo.com/mg/tvintegracao

TV Integração Ituiutaba (channel 7) is a Brazilian television station based in Ituiutaba, Minas Gerais serving as an affiliate of the TV Globo network. Since 2016, its coverage area is limited to the city of license.

== History ==
The station was founded in 1989 as TV Pontal, covering the Pontal Mineiro region, whose signal also reached Uberaba. Since launch, it was part of the TV Triângulo group of affiliates in inland Minas Gerais. In 1997, Rede Globo acquired stocks in the group and made investments to the stations, among them TV Pontal, which was renamed TV Ideal under this plan and improved its coverage area. The news operation was also improved. In 2003, the name Ideal was dropped after all of the group's stations adopted the uniform TV Integração brand.

Over time, the station's office in Uberaba eclipsed the main headquarters in Ituiutaba. This scheme continued until 2016, when TV Integração acquired a new license to operate in the city on channel 3, displacing its former relay on channel 11 (since then, it was occupied by Spiritist channel TV Mundo Maior, which generates its programs from Guarulhos). Uberaba produced programs for the Ituiutaba station until March 31, 2016; after that date, the coverage area was reduced to Ituiutaba following the launch of the new affiliate.

== Technical information ==
Subchannels of TV Integração Ituiutaba
Virtual	Resolution	Content
7.1	1080i	TV Integração Ituiutaba/Globo

The station started digital broadcasts on June 8, 2010, in both the city of license (Ituiutaba, channel 30) and city of production (Uberaba, channel 31).

Based on the federal decree envisioning the shutdown of analog TV, TV Integração Uberaba, as well as the other stations in Uberaba, shut down its analog signal on VHF channel 7 on December 31, 2023, following the official ANATEL roadmap.

== Programming ==
The station ceased producing local programming following the opening of TV Integração Uberaba on April 1, 2016, which inherited all of its programming, produced locally since 1997. Since then, TV Integração Ituiutaba only relays the newscasts produced by the main Rede Integração station in Uberlândia, with the insertion of local advertising, as well as producing news items for its newscasts.
