= Fronteira, Minas Gerais =

Fronteira
- Municipality
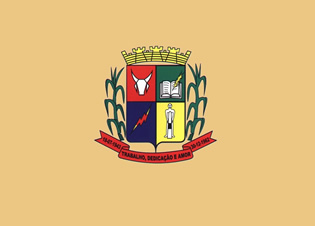
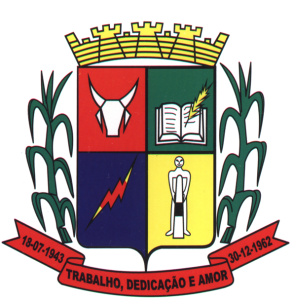
- Flag Coat of arms

- Location in Minas Gerais state

- Location in Brazil
- Coordinates: 20°16′52″S 49°12′11″W
- Country: Brazil
- Region: Southeast
- State: Minas Gerais

Government
  - Mayor: Sergio Paulo Campos (PSDB)

Area
  - Total: 199.99 km^{2} (77.22 sq mi)

Population (2020)
  - Total: 18,492
  - Density: 92.465/km^{2} (239.48/sq mi)
- Time zone: UTC−3 (BRT)
- Website: www.fronteira.mg.gov.br

Fronteira is a municipality in the west of the Brazilian state of Minas Gerais. The population is 18,492 (2020 est.) in an area of 199.99 km^{2}. It became a municipality in 1943.

== Geography ==
Fronteira is located at an elevation of 458 meters in the west of the area known as the Triângulo Mineiro, on the Transbrasiliana highway—Br-153. The Rio Grande, a tributary of the Paraná River, forms its southern boundary. The Marimbondo Dam and hydroelectric station is on the southern boundary of the municipal area. It belongs to the statistical microregion of Frutal. Neighboring municipalities are:

- North: Frutal
- East: Guaraci state of São Paulo
- West: Orindiúva state of São Paulo
- South: Icém, São Paulo

Distances

- Belo Horizonte: 645 km.
- Frutal: 44 km.
- Uberaba: 189 km.
- Uberlândia: 218 km
- São José do Rio Preto: 65 km.
- São Paulo: 477 km

== Economic activities ==
The most important economic activities are cattle raising, royalties from the hydroelectric station on the Rio Grande, commerce, and agriculture. The GDP in 2005 was R$1,035,952, with R$716,164 from industry; R$102,776 from services; and R$18,221 from agriculture. Fronteira is in the top tier of municipalities in the state with regard to economic and social development. As of 2007 there was one banking agency in the town. There was a well-developed retail infrastructure serving the surrounding area of cattle and agricultural lands. In the rural area there were 141 establishments occupying about 1,000 persons. 48 of the farms had tractors, a ratio of one in three. There were 1,889 automobiles in all of the municipality, about one for every 6 inhabitants—a high ratio for Brazil.

Fronteira is an important agricultural producer. There were 7,000 head of cattle in 2006, of which 4,000 head were dairy cows. In permanent crops there are 633 ha. planted, while in perennial crops 12,500 ha. were planted. The crops with a planted area of more than 100 hectares were pineapple, sugarcane, corn, and soybeans.

== Health and education ==
In the health sector there were 07 health clinics and no hospitals. In the educational sector there were 02 primary schools and 01 middle school.

- Municipal Human Development Index: 0.794 (2000)
- State ranking: 61 out of 853 municipalities as of 2000
- National ranking: 705 out of 5,138 municipalities as of 2000
- Literacy rate: 89%
- Life expectancy: 74 (average of males and females)

The highest ranking municipality in Minas Gerais in 2000 was Poços de Caldas with 0.841, while the lowest was Setubinha with 0.568. Nationally the highest was São Caetano do Sul in São Paulo with 0.919, while the lowest was Setubinha. In more recent statistics (considering 5,507 municipalities) Manari in the state of Pernambuco has the lowest rating in the country—0,467—putting it in last place.

== History ==
Fronteira was born of a dream, literally. In the 1940s Maurício Goulart, a businessman from São Paulo, envisioned a project: create a model city in the middle of central Brazil. Today Fronteira is one of a few planned communities in the region, with wide, tree-lined avenues and with a projected urban infrastructure. In 1943 Fronteira already had a post office and a public telephone. It had a small airport for those who came to play in the casinos that were legal at that time. The calling card of the town is a 12-meter statue of a nude man popularly known as "Bernardão".

== See also ==
- List of municipalities in Minas Gerais
