= Itapagipe =

Town and municipality in the state of Minas Gerais, Brazil

Coordinates: 19°54′32″S 49°22′51″W

- Municipality
- Interactive map of Itapagipe
- Country: Brazil
- State: Minas Gerais
- Region: Southeast
- Time zone: UTC−3 (BRT)

Location of Itapagipe in the state of Minas Gerais

Itapagipe is a municipality in the west of the Brazilian state of Minas Gerais. As of 2020 the population was 15,379 in a total area of 1,795 km^{2} (693 sq mi). It became a municipality in 1885.

== Geography ==
Itapagipe is located at an elevation of 516 m (1,693 ft) in the south-center of the area known as the Triângulo Mineiro 37 km. west of the Transbrasiliana highway—Br-153. The Rio Grande, a tributary of the Paraná River, forms its southern boundary. It belongs to the statistical micro-region of Frutal. Neighboring municipalities are:

- North: Frutal
- Northwest: Campina Verde
- West: São Francisco de Sales
- South: Paulo de Faria, São Paulo

Distances

- Belo Horizonte: 648 km (403 mi)
- Frutal: 48 km (30 mi)
- Uberaba: 193 km (120 mi)
- Uberlândia: 234 km (145 mi)
- São José do Rio Preto (SP): 143 km (89 mi)
- Iturama: 98 km (61 mi)
- São Paulo: 600 km (370 mi)
- Brasília: 710 km (440 mi)

== Origin of the name ==
The name Itapagipe comes from the tupi-guarani and means "hard rock". This name was chosen because of a large rock that covers all of the bed of the Lageado stream, which crosses the town.

== History ==
The district of Lageado, today Itapagipe, became a municipality in 1948, but it had been settled much earlier in 1880. The first settler, Antônio Gomes Sobreiro, "married" a Caiapó Indian girl and established his ranch in the region. A chapel was built and a small village began with the name of Santo Antônio do Lageado.

== Economic activities ==
The most important economic activities are cattle raising, commerce, and agriculture. The GDP in 2005 was R$ R$147,447. Itapagipe is in the top tier of municipalities in the state with regard to economic and social development. As of 2007 there were 02 banking agency in the town. There was a well-developed retail infrastructure serving the surrounding area of cattle and agricultural lands. In the rural area there were 1,336 establishments occupying about 3,300 persons. 414 of the farms had tractors, a ratio of one in three. There were 1,912 automobiles in all of the municipality, about one for every 7 inhabitants—a high ratio for Brazil.

The economic sectors of the town are divided into 285 commercial establishments, 29 industries, 25 services, and 02 banks. The town had 2,469 houses. Twelve churches attended to the religious needs of the population.

Itapagipe is an important agricultural producer. There were 183,000 head of cattle in 2006, of which 35,000 head were dairy cows. In permanent crops there were 92 ha (230 acres). planted, while in perennial crops 14,000 ha (35,000 acres) were planted (2006). The crops with a planted area of more than 100 hectares (250 acres) were pineapple, rice, oranges, sugarcane, corn, sorghum, and soybeans.

== Health and education ==
In the health sector there were 5 health clinics and one hospital with 15 beds. In the educational sector there were 5 primary schools and 1 middle school.

- Municipal Human Development Index: 0.788 (2000)
- State ranking: 61 out of 853 municipalities as of 2000
- National ranking: 705 out of 5,138 municipalities as of 2000
- Literacy rate: 89%
- Life expectancy: 74 (average of males and females)

The highest ranking municipality in Minas Gerais in 2000 was Poços de Caldas with 0.841, while the lowest was Setubinha with 0.568. Nationally the highest was São Caetano do Sul in São Paulo with 0.919, while the lowest was Setubinha. In more recent statistics (considering 5,507 municipalities) Manari in the state of Pernambuco has the lowest rating in the country—0,467—putting it in last place.

== See also ==
- List of municipalities in Minas Gerais
