= Iturama =

Municipality in Minas Gerais, Brazil

- Municipality
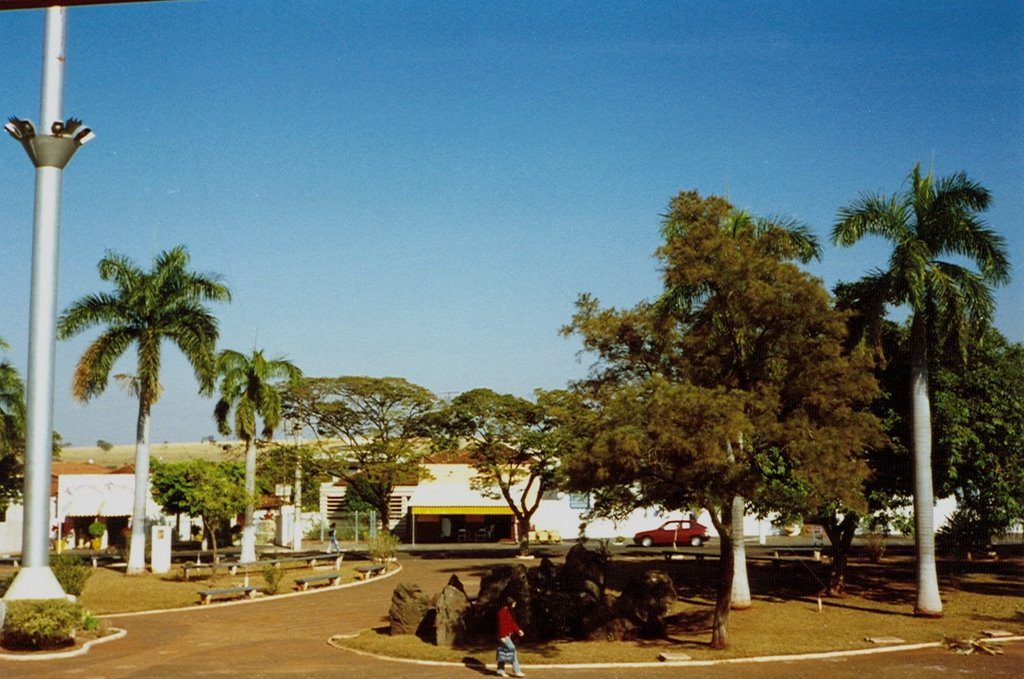
- Dona Francisca Justiniana de Andrade Square

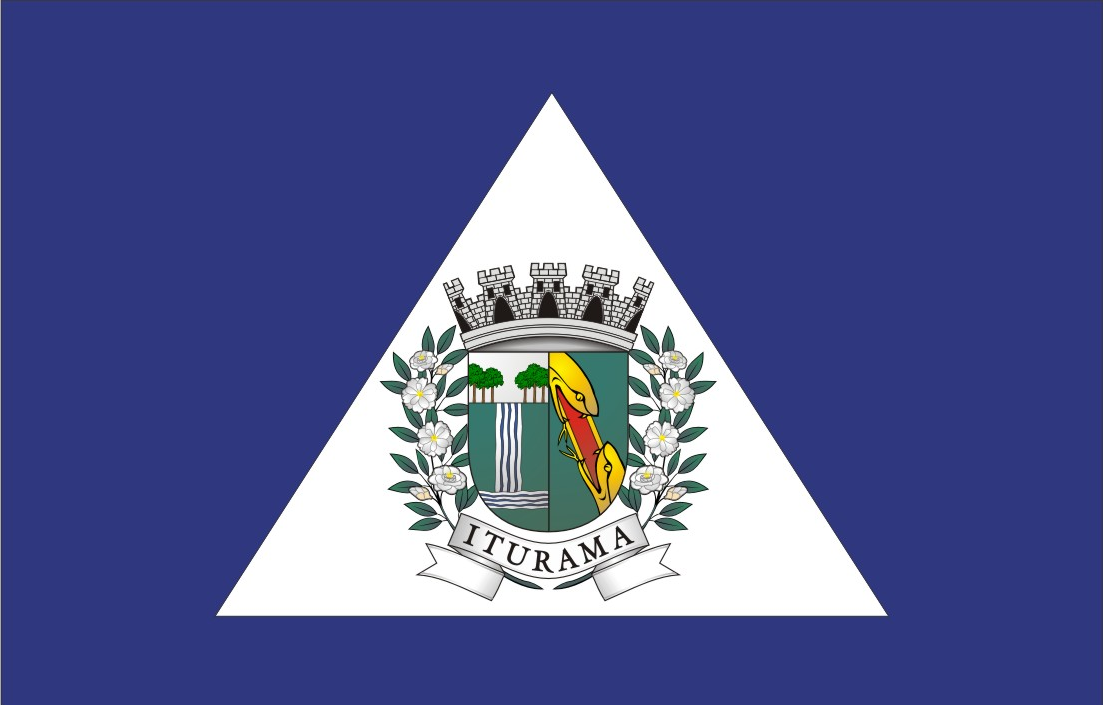
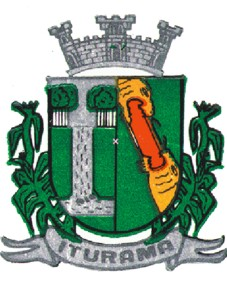
- Flag Coat of arms

- Location in Minas Gerais

- Location in Brazil
- Coordinates: 19°43′40″S 50°11′45″W
- Country: Brazil
- Region: Southeast
- State: Minas Gerais
- Intermediate region: Uberaba
- Immediate region: Iturama
- Municipality created: 27 December 1948
- Installed: 1 January 1949
- Districts: Iturama, Alexandrita

Government
  - Mayor: José Herculano Pereira dos Santos (Republicans)
  - Term: 2025–2028

Area
  - Total: 1,404.663 km^{2} (542.343 sq mi)

Population (2022)
  - Total: 38,295
  - Estimate (2025): 40,259
  - Density: 27.263/km^{2} (70.610/sq mi)
- Demonym: ituramense

Socioeconomic indicators
  - HDI (2010): 0.747
  - GDP per capita (2023): R$74,812.25
- Time zone: UTC−3 (BRT)
- Postal code: 38280-000
- Area code: 34
- Website: www.iturama.mg.gov.br

Iturama is a municipality in the Triângulo Mineiro of western Minas Gerais, Brazil. It is the seat of the Immediate Geographic Region of Iturama and belongs to the Intermediate Geographic Region of Uberaba. The municipality covers 1,404.663 km^{2} (542.343 sq mi). Its population was 38,295 in the 2022 census and was estimated at 40,259 in 2025.

The settlement grew on land donated by Francisca Justiniana de Andrade to the Diocese of Uberaba in 1897. The district was first called Santa Rosa and later Camélia before becoming the municipality of Iturama in 1948. The municipality consists of the districts of Iturama and Alexandrita. The Federal University of the Triângulo Mineiro has maintained a campus in Iturama since 2015.

== History ==
Francisca Justiniana de Andrade donated 189 alqueires from the Santa Rosa farm to the Diocese of Uberaba on 24 March 1897. A settlement called Santa Rosa grew on the donated land.

State Decree-Law No. 148 made Santa Rosa a district of Campina Verde on 17 December 1938. The district was renamed Camélia in 1943. State Law No. 336 created the municipality under the name Iturama on 27 December 1948, and the municipality was installed on 1 January 1949.

Alexandrita formed part of Iturama by 1953. State Law No. 10,704 created the municipalities of Carneirinho and Limeira do Oeste from districts that had belonged to Iturama on 27 April 1992.

== Geography ==
Iturama covers 1,404.663 km^{2} (542.343 sq mi) at the western end of the Triângulo Mineiro. The municipality consists of the districts of Iturama and Alexandrita.

It borders Carneirinho, Limeira do Oeste, União de Minas, Campina Verde, and São Francisco de Sales in Minas Gerais. Across the state boundary in São Paulo are Populina, Ouroeste, Indiaporã, and Mira Estrela. The Grande River and the reservoir of the Água Vermelha Dam form part of its southern boundary. The municipality lies within the Grande River basin.

== Economy ==
Farming, cattle raising, services, and sugarcane processing are parts of the local economy. The municipality's GDP per capita was R$74,812.25 in 2023.

S.A. Usina Coruripe Açúcar e Álcool operates an industrial unit in Iturama.

== Education ==
The Federal University of the Triângulo Mineiro opened its Iturama campus on 13 February 2015. Its first undergraduate programs were Agronomy, Biological Sciences, and Chemistry.

== See also ==
- List of municipalities in Minas Gerais
