= Conquista, Minas Gerais =

Municipality in Minas Gerais, Brazil

Conquista
- Municipality
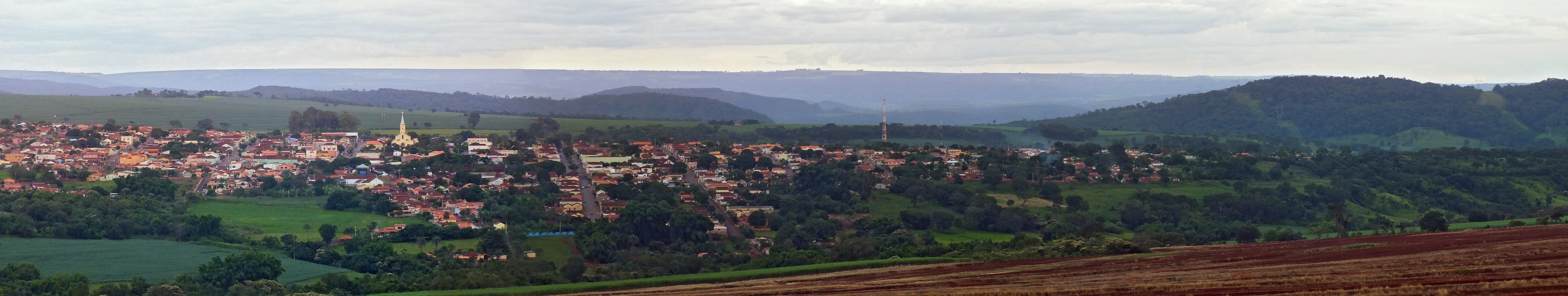
- Conquista seen from Cristo Redentor Park

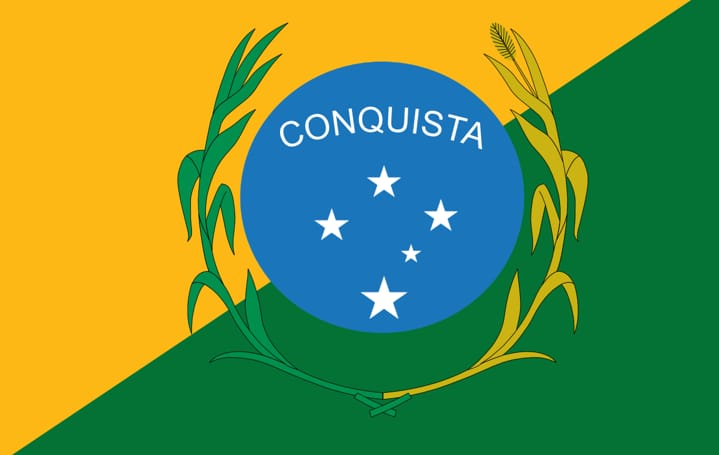
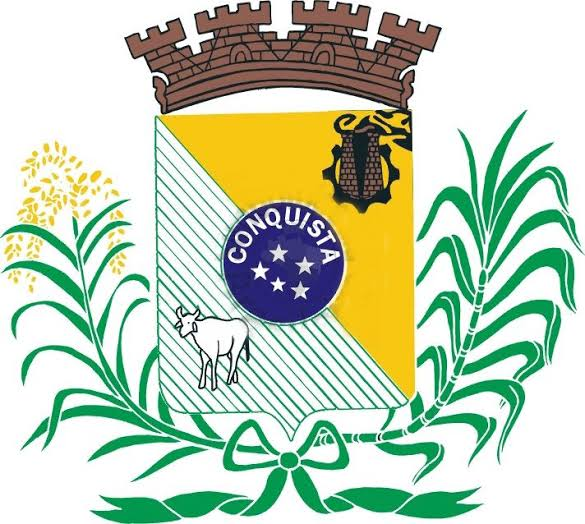
- Flag Coat of arms

- Location in Minas Gerais

- Location in Brazil
- Coordinates: 19°56′13″S 47°32′31″W
- Country: Brazil
- Region: Southeast
- State: Minas Gerais
- Intermediate region: Uberaba
- Immediate region: Uberaba
- Municipality created: 30 August 1911
- Installed: 1 June 1912
- City status: 10 September 1925
- Districts: Conquista, Guaxima, Jubaí

Government
  - Mayor: Bráulio Queiroga de Moura Filho (2025–2028) (MDB)

Area
  - Total: 618.363 km^{2} (238.751 sq mi)

Population (2022)
  - Total: 6,694
  - Estimate (2025): 6,878
  - Density: 10.83/km^{2} (28.04/sq mi)
- Demonym: conquistense

Socioeconomic indicators
  - HDI (2010): 0.729
  - GDP per capita (2023): R$100,331.51
- Time zone: UTC−3 (BRT)
- Postal code: 38195-000
- Area code: 34
- Website: www.conquista.mg.gov.br

Conquista is a municipality in the Triângulo Mineiro of western Minas Gerais, Brazil. It belongs to the Immediate Geographic Region of Uberaba and the Intermediate Geographic Region of Uberaba. The municipality covers 618.363 km^{2} (238.751 sq mi). Its population was 6,694 in the 2022 census and was estimated at 6,878 in 2025.

The settlement grew near Fazenda da Conquista as workers arrived to build the Mogiana Railway during the late nineteenth century. Conquista was separated from Sacramento in 1911 and installed as a municipality in 1912. It consists of the districts of Conquista, Guaxima, and Jubaí. Television writer Janete Clair was born in Conquista.

== History ==
An expedition from Desemboque crossed the area in 1803, after which the surveyed land was divided into sesmarias. Domingos Vilela de Andrade established Fazenda da Conquista. The property of Manuel Bernardes Nazianzeno da Silveira became a stopping place on the route to Porto da Ponte Alta, where merchants moved goods between Minas Gerais, Goiás, and Mato Grosso.

Francisco Meireles do Carmo opened a store around 1888 to supply crews building the Mogiana Railway. Other workers arrived for railway construction and the extraction of latex from mangabeira trees. Crispiniano Tavares prepared a street plan for the settlement in 1894.

Municipal laws created the district of Conquista in 1892 and 1901. It was installed in May 1906 as part of Sacramento. State Law No. 556 separated Conquista from Sacramento and created a municipality on 30 August 1911. The municipality was installed on 1 June 1912.

The municipality initially consisted of Conquista and São Francisco da Ponte Alta, which later took the name Jubaí. State Law No. 843 created the district of Guaxima in 1923. The seat of Conquista received city status on 10 September 1925.

== Geography ==
Conquista covers 618.363 km^{2} (238.751 sq mi) along the boundary between Minas Gerais and São Paulo. It borders Uberaba, Delta, and Sacramento in Minas Gerais, and Igarapava and Rifaina in São Paulo.

The Grande River forms much of the southern boundary. Conquista belongs to the hydrographic basin of the Minas Gerais tributaries of the lower Grande River, known as GD8.

The municipality is divided into the districts of Conquista, Guaxima, and Jubaí.

== Economy ==
Family farms supply fruit, vegetables, and dairy products to the municipal school meal program through direct public purchases.

Sugarcane processing operated at an industrial complex at Fazenda Ilha Grande. Delta Sucroenergia leased the Conquista de Minas unit in 2011. The unit left the company group in 2024.

The municipality's GDP per capita was R$100,331.51 in 2023.

== Notable people ==
- Janete Clair, television writer

== See also ==
- List of municipalities in Minas Gerais
