= União de Minas =

Municipality in Minas Gerais, Brazil

- Municipality
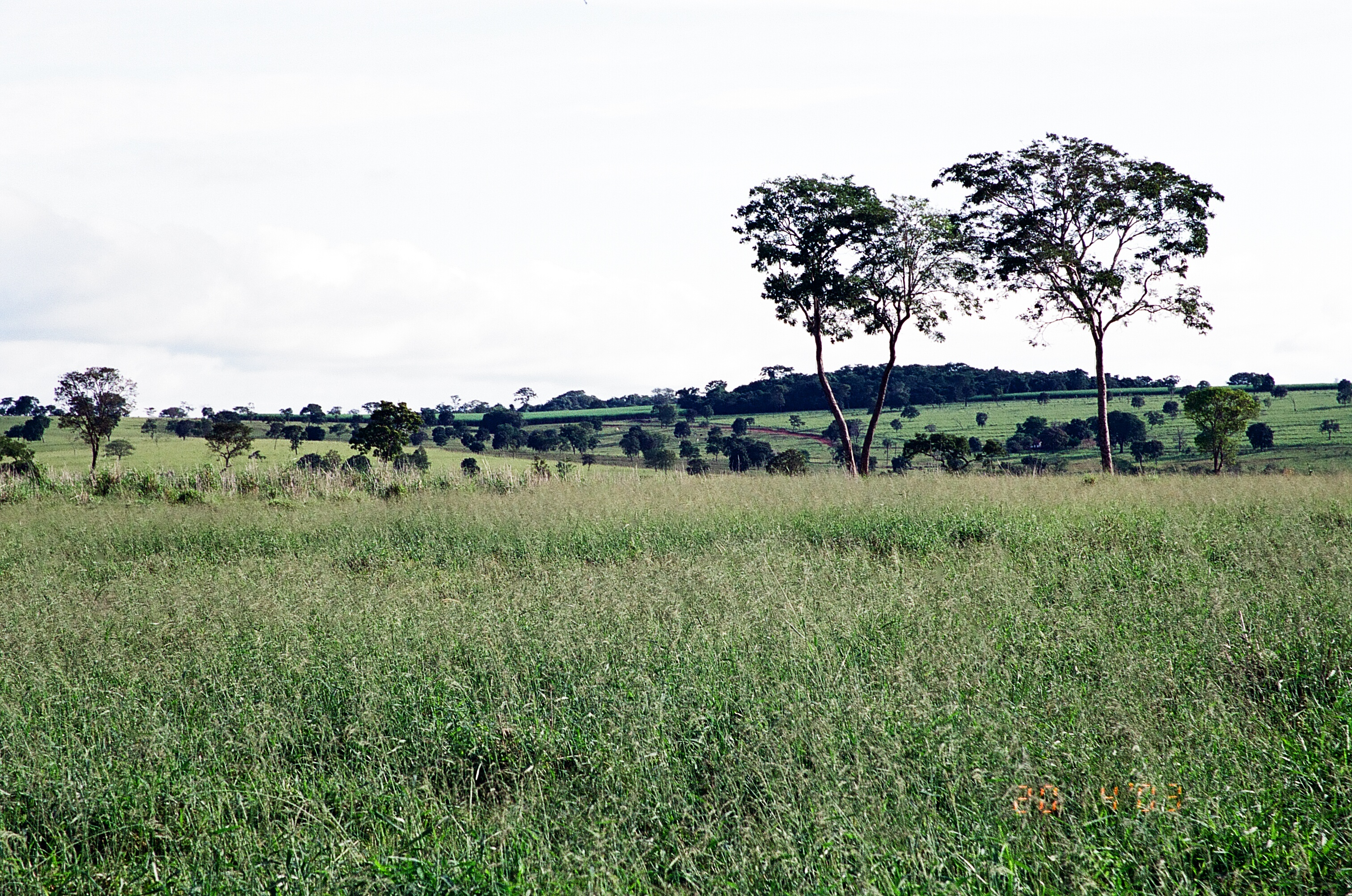
- Fazenda Casinhas

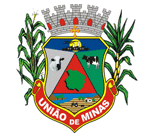
- Flag Coat of arms

- Location in Minas Gerais

- Location in Brazil
- Coordinates: 19°31′48″S 50°20′09″W
- Country: Brazil
- Region: Southeast
- State: Minas Gerais
- Intermediate region: Uberaba
- Immediate region: Iturama
- District created: 13 May 1976
- Municipality created: 21 December 1995
- Installed: 1 January 1997
- District: União de Minas

Government
  - Mayor: Geova Tomaz de Almeida (2025–2028) (Solidarity)

Area
  - Total: 1,147.407 km^{2} (443.016 sq mi)

Population (2022)
  - Total: 3,828
  - Estimate (2025): 3,818
  - Density: 3.336/km^{2} (8.641/sq mi)
- Demonym: uniense

Socioeconomic indicators
  - HDI (2010): 0.672
  - GDP per capita (2023): R$49,027.83
- Time zone: UTC−3 (BRT)
- Postal code: 38288-000
- Area code: 34
- Website: www.uniaodeminas.mg.gov.br

União de Minas is a municipality in the Triângulo Mineiro of western Minas Gerais, Brazil. It belongs to the Immediate Geographic Region of Iturama and the Intermediate Geographic Region of Uberaba. The municipality covers 1,147.407 km^{2} (443.016 sq mi). Its population was 3,828 in the 2022 census and was estimated at 3,818 in 2025.

The settlement began near a place called Casinhas and was later called Porteirão, Bela Vista do Porteirão, and União. It became a district of Iturama in 1976. União de Minas was created as a municipality in 1995 and installed in 1997. The municipality consists only of its seat district.

== History ==
The settlement grew near Casinhas during the 1920s and 1930s. It was first called Porteirão, then Bela Vista do Porteirão, and later União.

State Law No. 6,769 created the district of União under Iturama on 13 May 1976. State Law No. 12,030 separated the district from Iturama and created the municipality of União de Minas on 21 December 1995. The municipality was installed on 1 January 1997.

== Geography ==
União de Minas covers 1,147.407 km^{2} (443.016 sq mi) in western Minas Gerais. The terrain is mostly flat to gently rolling.

The municipality borders Limeira do Oeste, Santa Vitória, Campina Verde, and Iturama. Parts of its boundaries follow the São Domingos and Arantes rivers. The boundary with Iturama follows the divide between the Grande and Paranaíba river systems.

== Economy ==
Cattle raising, crop farming, and agroindustry form the local economic base. The municipality's GDP per capita was R$49,027.83 in 2023.

== See also ==
- List of municipalities in Minas Gerais
