= Carneirinho =

- Municipality
- The Municipality of Carneirinho
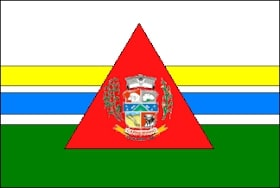
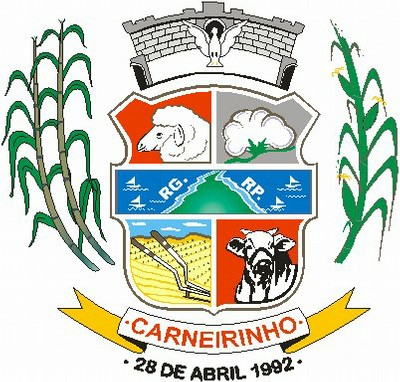
- Flag Coat of arms

- Location in Minas Gerais
- Coordinates: 19°41′52″S 50°41′16″W
- Country: Brazil
- Region: Southeast
- State: Minas Gerais
- Founded: April 28, 1992

Government
  - Mayor: Dalva Maria de Queiroz Tiago

Area
  - Total: 2,060.720 km^{2} (795.648 sq mi)

Population (2020)
  - Total: 10,066
  - Density: 4/km^{2} (10/sq mi)
- Time zone: UTC−3 (BRT)
- HDI (2000): 0.763 medium

Carneirinho is a municipality in the westernmost tip of the Brazilian state of Minas Gerais. Due to its location, it is the only municipality in Minas Gerais to border the state of Mato Grosso do Sul. As of 2020 the population was 10,066 in a total area of 2,060.720 km^{2} (795.648 sq mi). It became a municipality in 1993.

== History ==
The town of Carneirinho was founded in 1954 by the Carneiro family, thus the origin of the name. The first settlement had begun on the Bom Sucesso cattle ranch in the late nineteenth century. In 1941 a general store opened on the banks of the Mutuca stream and houses were built nearby. The first church was built in 1952, consecrated to Our Lady Aparecida. In 1962 the district of Carneirinho was established and in 1992 it became a municipality.

== Geography ==
The municipality is composed of the districts of São Sebastião do Pontal, Estrela da Barra and Fátima do Pontal; and the villages of Aparecida do Paranaíba "Barbosa" and Gracilândia "Pereira".

Carneirinho is located at an elevation of 431 meters in the extreme west of the state about 30 km east of the Represa da Ilha Solteira, which forms the Paraná River. It belongs to the microregion of Frutal. Neighboring municipalities are:

- Northeast: Limeira do Oeste
- East: Iturama
- Southeast: Populina, Mesópolis e Santa Albertina in the state of São Paulo
- South: Santa Rita d'Oeste and Santa Clara d'Oeste in the state of São Paulo
- Northwest: Itajá in the state of Goiás
- West: Aparecida do Taboado and Paranaíba in the state of Mato Grosso do Sul

=== Distances ===
- Belo Horizonte: 823 km.
- Iturama: 55 km.
- Uberaba: 331 km.

== Economy ==
The most important economic activities are cattle raising, commerce, light industry, food processing, and agriculture. The GDP in 2005 was R$95,862,000. Carneirinho is in the top tier of municipalities in the state with regard to economic and social development. As of 2007 there was 01 banking agency in the town. There was a well-developed retail infrastructure serving the surrounding area of cattle and agricultural lands. In the rural area there were 714 establishments occupying about 1,600 workers. 246 of the farms had tractors, a ratio of one in three. There were 1,150 automobiles in all of the municipality, about one for every 7 inhabitants.

Campina Verde is an important agricultural producer. There were 242,000 head of cattle in 2006, of which 45,000 head were dairy cows. Cultivated pastures make up the main use of the soil with 160,400 ha, representing 80% of the total area of the municipality. Natural pasture makes up 5,365 ha (3% of the area). In permanent crops there are 1,029 ha. planted (0.5% of the total area) with the main crops being sugarcane and manioc.

The crops with a planted area of more than 100 hectares were:

- cotton: 190 ha.
- sugarcane: 500 ha.
- corn: 3,000 ha.
- soybeans: 100 ha.

== Health and education ==
In the health sector there were 08 health clinics and no hospitals. In the educational sector there were 09 primary schools and 03 middle schools.

- Municipal Human Development Index: 0.763 (2000)
- State ranking: 199 out of 853 municipalities as of 2000
- National ranking: 1,593 out of 5,138 municipalities as of 2000
- Literacy rate: 81%
- Life expectancy: 73 (average of males and females)

== See also ==
- List of municipalities in Minas Gerais
