= São Francisco de Sales =

Municipality in the west of the Brazilian state of Minas Gerais

Coordinates: 19°51′25″S 49°46′26″W

- Municipality
- Interactive map of São Francisco de Sales
- Country: Brazil
- State: Minas Gerais
- Region: Southeast
- Time zone: UTC−3 (BRT)

Location of São Francisco de Sales in the state of Minas Gerais

São Francisco de Sales is a municipality in the west of the Brazilian state of Minas Gerais. As of 2020 the population was 6,274 in a total area of 1,129 km^{2}. It became a municipality in 1962.

== Geography ==
São Francisco de Sales belongs to the statistical micro-region of Frutal. It is located at an elevation of 423 meters on the northern bank of the Rio Grande and is crossed by the Verde River. Neighboring municipalities are:

- North: Campina Verde
- West: Iturama
- East: Itapagipe
- South: the state of São Paulo

=== Distances ===
- Campina Verde: 46 km
- Iturama: 50 km
- Itapagipe: 43 km
- Frutal: 91 km
- Belo Horizonte: 692 km

The highways of access are: BR-262, BR-050, MG-427, BR-364, and MG-255.

== History ==
The town had its origins in an Indian village, located on the banks of the Rio Verde. Around 1835 a priest, Jerônimo Gonçalves Macedo, arrived and put up a cross. In 1850 a district was formed with the name "Missões", later changed to São Francisco de Sales in homage to the founder of the Salesian order. In 1962 the district was dismembered from Campina Verde to become a municipality.

== Economic activities ==
The most important economic activities are cattle raising, commerce, and agriculture. The GDP in 2005 was R$ R$54 million of which half came from agriculture. São Francisco de Sales is in the top tier of municipalities in the state with regard to economic and social development. As of 2007 there were no banking agencies in the town. There was a small retail infrastructure serving the surrounding area of cattle and agricultural lands. There were 628 automobiles in all of the municipality, about one for every 8 inhabitants.

In the rural area there were 298 establishments occupying 58,000 hectares. About 600 persons were employed in agriculture. 125 of the farms had tractors, a ratio of one in four farms. There were 101,000 head of cattle in 2006, of which 22,000 head were dairy cows. In permanent crops there were 1,500 ha. planted, while in perennial crops 2,200 ha. were planted (2006). The crops with a planted area of more than 1,000 hectares were sugarcane, corn, and soybeans.

== Health and education ==
In the health sector there was 01 health clinic and 01 hospital with 11 beds. In the educational sector there was 01 primary school and 01 middle school.

- Municipal Human Development Index: 0.786 (2000)
- State ranking: 95 out of 853 municipalities as of 2000
- National ranking: 917 out of 5,138 municipalities as of 2000
- Literacy rate: 88%
- Life expectancy: 73 (average of males and females)

The highest ranking municipality in Minas Gerais in 2000 was Poços de Caldas with 0.841, while the lowest was Setubinha with 0.568. Nationally the highest was São Caetano do Sul in São Paulo with 0.919, while the lowest was Setubinha. In more recent statistics (considering 5,507 municipalities) Manari in the state of Pernambuco has the lowest rating in the country—0,467—putting it in last place.

== See also ==
- List of municipalities in Minas Gerais
