= Delta, Minas Gerais =

Delta
- Municipality
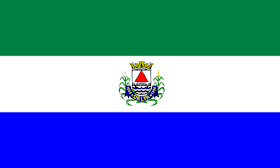
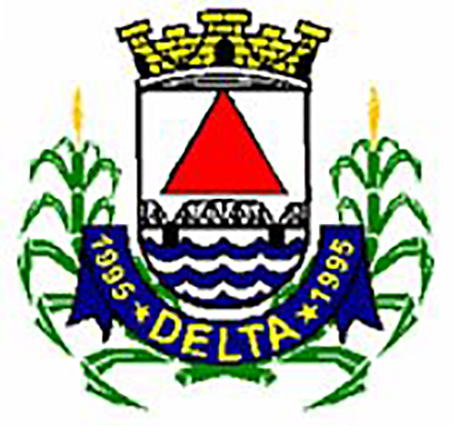
- Flag Coat of arms

- Location of Delta in Minas Gerais

- Location of Delta in Brazil
- Coordinates: 19°58′37″S 47°46′15″W
- Country: Brazil
- State: Minas Gerais
- Municipality status: 1997

Area
  - Total: 104 km^{2} (40 sq mi)
- Elevation: 500 m (1,600 ft)

Population (2020)
  - Total: 10,768
  - Density: 104/km^{2} (268/sq mi)
- Time zone: UTC−3 (BRT)

Delta is a Brazilian municipality located in the west of the state of Minas Gerais. Its population as of 2020 was estimated to be 10,768 people living in a total area of 104 square kilometres (40 sq mi). The city belongs to the mesoregion of Triângulo Mineiro and Alto Paranaíba and to the micro-region of Uberaba. It became a municipality in 1997.

Delta is located at an elevation of 500 meters (1,640 ft), 28 km (17 mi) southeast of Uberaba on highway BR-060. The distance to the state capital, Belo Horizonte, is 496 km (308 mi). Neighboring municipalities are: Uberaba (N and W), Conquista (E), and Igarapava (S). The southern boundary is formed by the Rio Grande.

The main economic activities are services, industry and agriculture. Industry employed over 3,000 people. The GDP in 2005 was approximately R$190 million, with 52 million Reais from services, 108 million Reais from industry, and 10 million Reais from agriculture. There were 94 rural producers on 9,000 hectares (22,000 acres) of land. The land is very fertile and agricultural production is high. 21 farms had tractors (2006). Approximately 300 people were dependent on agriculture. The main crops were sugarcane (6,000 ha or 15,000 acres planted in 2006) and soybeans (700 ha or 1,700 acres planted in 2006), but oranges, cotton, rice, beans and corn were also grown. There were 3,700 head of cattle (2006). There were no banks (2007) and 1,660 automobiles, giving a ratio of four inhabitants per automobile.

There was one health clinic. Patients with more serious health conditions are transported to Uberaba, which is connected by good roads. Educational needs were met by two primary schools, one middle school, and one pre-primary schools.

- Municipal Human Development Index: 0.750 (2000)
- State ranking: 280 out of 853 municipalities as of 2000
- National ranking: 1,866 out of 5,138 municipalities as of 2000
- Literacy rate: 83%
- Life expectancy: 71 (average of males and females)

In 2000 the per capita monthly income of R$210.00 was below the state and national average of R$276.00 and R$297.00 respectively.

The highest ranking municipality in Minas Gerais in 2000 was Poços de Caldas with 0.841, while the lowest was Setubinha with 0.568. Nationally the highest was São Caetano do Sul in São Paulo with 0.919, while the lowest was Setubinha. In more recent statistics (considering 5,507 municipalities) Manari in the state of Pernambuco has the lowest rating in the country—0.467—putting it in last place.

== See also ==
- List of municipalities in Minas Gerais
