= Veríssimo =

Town and municipality in the state of Minas Gerais, Brazil

Coordinates: 19°39′46″S 48°18′28″W

- Municipality
- Interactive map of Veríssimo
- Country: Brazil
- State: Minas Gerais
- Region: Southeast
- Time zone: UTC−3 (BRT)

Location of Veríssimo

Veríssimo is a Brazilian municipality located in the west of the state of Minas Gerais. Its population as of 2020 was estimated to be 4,045 people living in a total area of 1,028 km^{2} (397 sq mi). The city belongs to the mesoregion of Triângulo Mineiro and Alto Paranaíba and to the micro-region of Uberaba. It became a municipality in 1938.

Veríssimo is located at an elevation of 674 meters, 43 km. west of Uberaba. The distance to the state capital, Belo Horizonte, is 513 km. Neighboring municipalities are: Uberaba, Conceição das Alagoas, Campo Florido, Prata, and Uberlândia.

The main economic activities are services, small industries, and agriculture. The GDP in 2005 was approximately R$57 million, with 15 million Reais from services, 10 million Reais from industry, and 28 million Reais from agriculture. There were 516 rural producers on 76,000 hectares of land. The land is very fertile and agricultural production is high. 121 farms had tractors (2006). Approximately 1,100 persons were dependent on agriculture. The main crops were sugarcane and soybeans, but rubber, coffee, cotton, rice, beans and corn were also grown. There were 76,000 head of cattle (2006). There was 1 bank (2007) and 314 automobiles (165 motorcycles), giving a ratio of 11 inhabitants per automobile.

There was 1 health clinic. Patients with more serious health conditions are transported to Uberaba, which is connected by established roads. Educational needs were met by 3 primary schools, 1 middle school, and 2 pre-primary schools.

- Municipal Human Development Index: 0.776 (2000)
- State ranking: 133 out of 853 municipalities as of 2000
- National ranking: 1,164 out of 5,138 municipalities as of 2000
- Literacy rate: 85%
- Life expectancy: 74 (average of males and females)

In 2000 the per capita monthly income of R$244.00 was just below the state and national average of R$276.00 and R$297.00 respectively.

The highest ranking municipality in Minas Gerais in 2000 was Poços de Caldas with 0.841, while the lowest was Setubinha with 0.568. Nationally the highest was São Caetano do Sul in São Paulo with 0.919, while the lowest was Setubinha. In more recent statistics (considering 5,507 municipalities) Manari in the state of Pernambuco has the lowest rating in the country—0,467—putting it in last place.

== See also ==
- List of municipalities in Minas Gerais
