= Conceição das Alagoas =

Town and municipality in the state of Minas Gerais, Brazil

Coordinates: 19°54′54″S 48°23′16″W

- Municipality
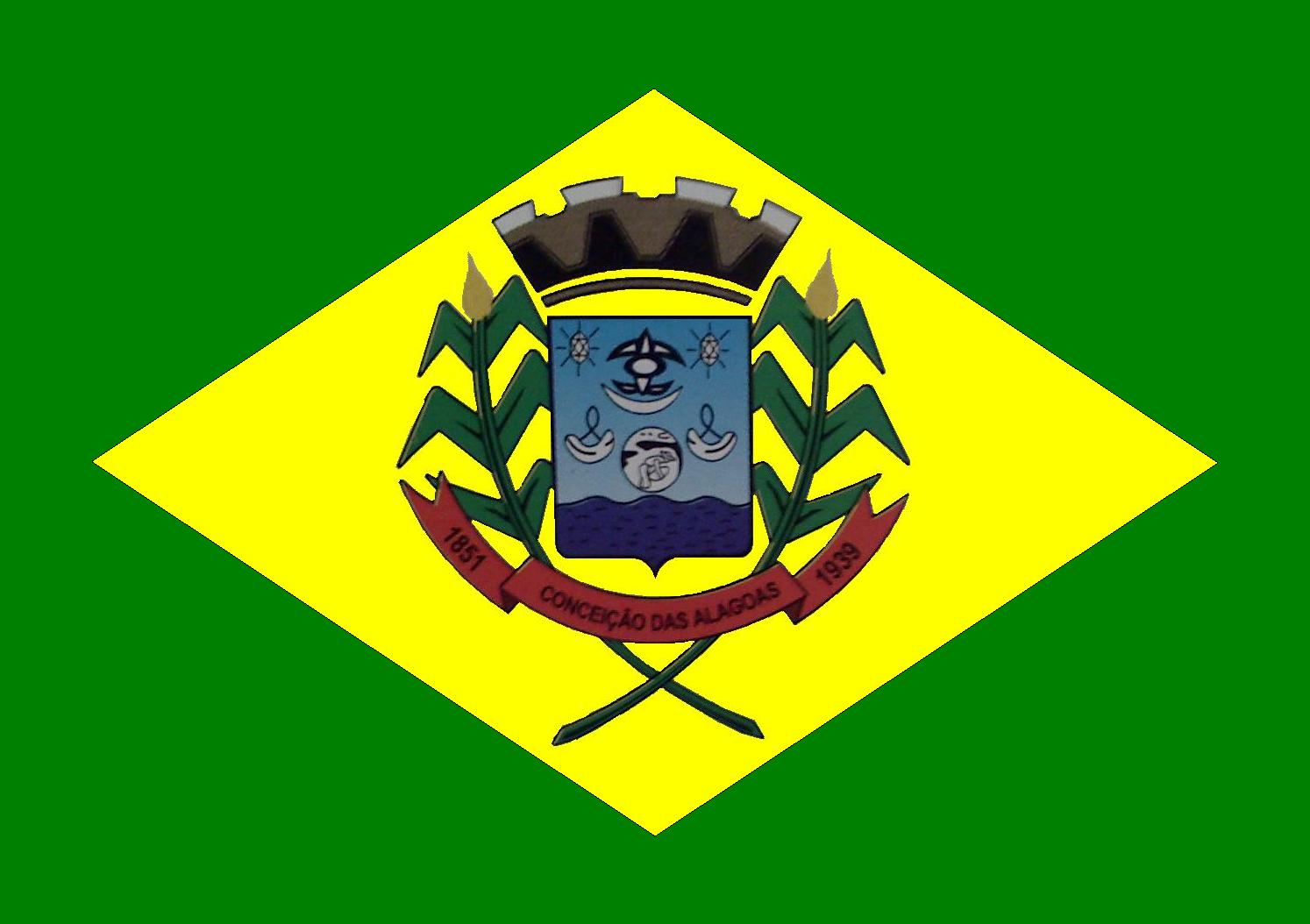
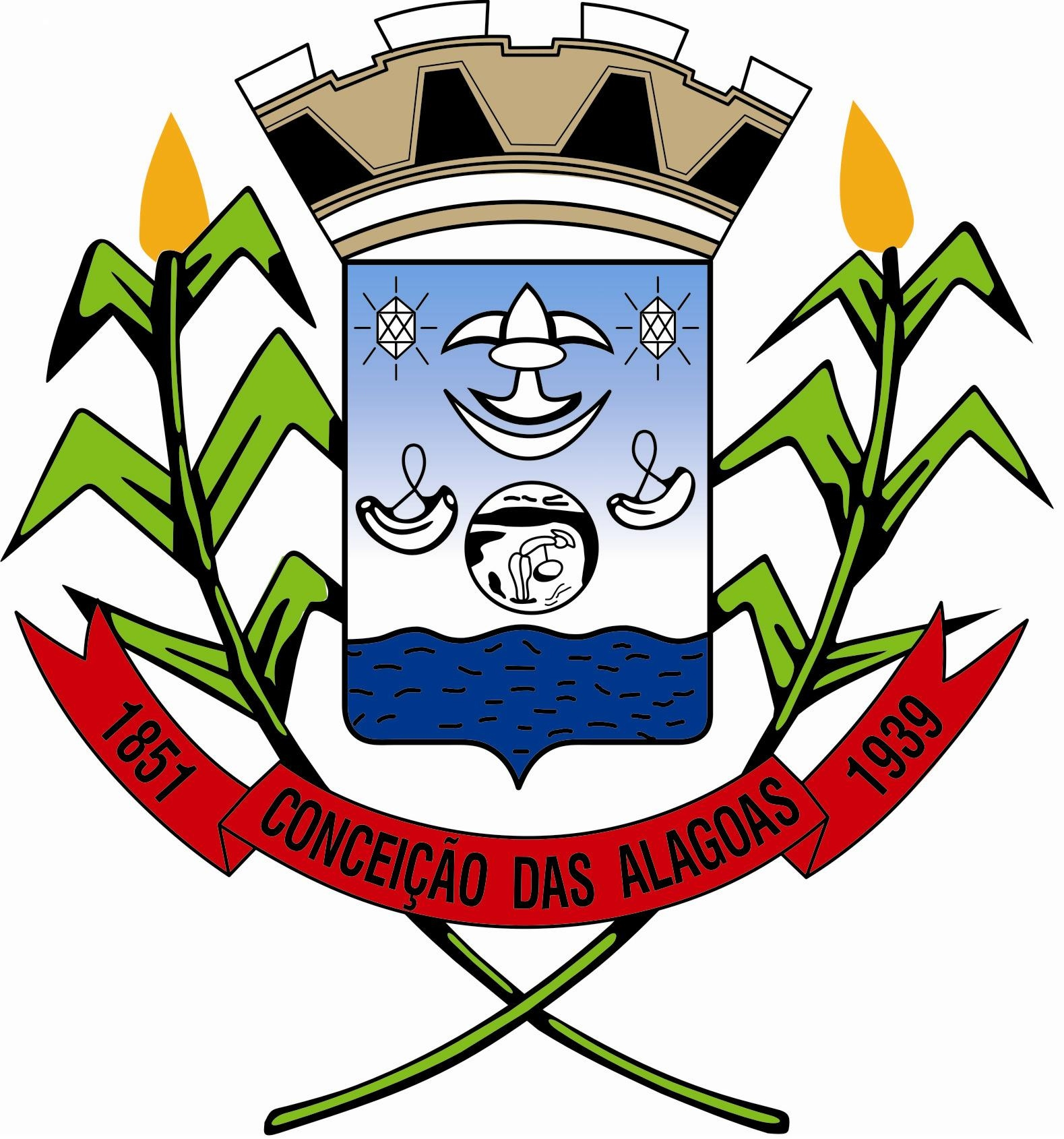
- Flag Coat of arms
- Interactive map of Conceição das Alagoas
- Country: Brazil
- State: Minas Gerais
- Region: Southeast
- Time zone: UTC−3 (BRT)

Location of Conceição das Alagoas

Conceição das Alagoas is a Brazilian municipality located in the west of the state of Minas Gerais. Its population as of 2020 was estimated to be 28,346 people living in a total area of 1,348 km^{2} (520 sq mi). The city belongs to the mesoregion of Triângulo Mineiro and Alto Paranaíba and to the micro-region of Uberaba. It became a municipality in 1938.

== Geography ==
Conceição das Alagoas is located at an elevation of 509 metres (1,670 feet), 56 km (35 mi). southwest of Uberaba. The distance to the state capital, Belo Horizonte, is 530 km (330 mi). Neighboring municipalities are: Veríssimo (N), Uberaba (NE), Água Comprida (E), Miguelópolis, Guaíra, Colômbia (S), Planura, Pirajuba (W) and Campo Florido (NW).

The name of the town is in homage to the Virgin of the Conception and the many lakes in the area.

== Economy ==
The main economic activities are services, industry (especially brick making), and agriculture. There is an alcohol distilling plant for biodiesel. The GDP in 2005 was approximately R$606 million, with 121 million Reais from services, 300 million Reais from industry, and 102 million Reais from agriculture. There were 298 rural producers on 37,000 hectares (91,000 acres) of land. The land is very fertile and agricultural production is high. 127 farms had tractors (2006). Approximately 1,100 persons were dependent on agriculture. The main crops were sugarcane (27,000 hectares (67,000 acres) planted in 2006)) and soybeans (30,600 hectares (76,000 acres) planted in 2006), but rubber, coffee, cotton, rice, beans and corn were also grown. There were 39,000 head of cattle (2006). There were 3 banks (2007) and 3,083 automobiles (1,150 motorcycles), giving a ratio of 7 inhabitants per automobile.

== Health and education ==
There were 9 health clinics and 1 hospital with 39 beds. Patients with more serious health conditions are transported to Uberaba, which is connected by good roads. Educational needs were met by 10 primary schools, 1 middle school, and 8 pre-primary schools.

== Municipal social indicators ==
- Municipal Human Development Index: 0.767 (2000)
- State ranking: 183 out of 853 municipalities as of 2000
- National ranking: 1,402 out of 5,138 municipalities as of 2000
- Literacy rate: 86%
- Life expectancy: 71 (average of males and females)

In 2000 the per capita monthly income of R$283.00 was close to the state and national average of R$276.00 and R$297.00 respectively.

The highest ranking municipality in Minas Gerais in 2000 was Poços de Caldas with 0.841, while the lowest was Setubinha with 0.568. Nationally the highest was São Caetano do Sul in São Paulo with 0.919, while the lowest was Setubinha. In more recent statistics (considering 5,507 municipalities) Manari in the state of Pernambuco has the lowest rating in the country—0,467—putting it in last place.

== See also ==
- List of municipalities in Minas Gerais
