= Comendador Gomes =

- Municipality
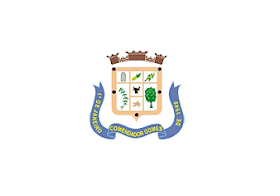
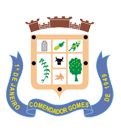
- Flag Coat of arms

- Location in Minas Gerais state

- Location in Brazil
- Coordinates: 19°41′S 49°4′W
- Country: Brazil
- Region: Southeast
- State: Minas Gerais

Area
  - Total: 1,041.05 km^{2} (401.95 sq mi)

Population (2020)
  - Total: 3,120
  - Density: 3.00/km^{2} (7.76/sq mi)
- Time zone: UTC−3 (BRT)

Comendador Gomes is a municipality in the west of the Brazilian state of Minas Gerais. The population is 3,120 (2020 est.) in an area of 1,041.05 km^{2} (401.95 square miles). It became a municipality in 1948.

== Geography ==
Comendador Gomes is located at an elevation of 557 meters in the west of the area known as the Triângulo Mineiro about 15 km (9.3 miles) west of the Transbrasiliana highway (Br-153). It belongs to the statistical microregion of Frutal. Neighboring municipalities are:

- North: Pirajuba
- East: Prata
- West and Southwest: Itapagipe
- South: Frutal

Distances

- Belo Horizonte: 603 km (375 miles)
- Frutal: 55 km (34 miles)
- Uberaba: 200 km (120 miles)

== Economic activities ==
The most important economic activities are cattle raising, commerce, and agriculture. The GDP in 2005 was R$ 55,658,000. Comendador Gomes is in the top tier of municipalities in the state with regard to economic and social development. As of 2007 there were no banking agencies in the town. There was a well-developed retail infrastructure serving the surrounding area of cattle and agricultural lands. In the rural area there were 369 establishments occupying about 1,000 persons. 176 of the farms had tractors, a ratio of one in two. There were 309 automobiles in all of the municipality, about one for every 10 inhabitants.

Comendador Gomes is an important agricultural producer. There were 61,000 head of cattle in 2006, of which 12,000 head were dairy cows. In permanent crops there are 1,128 ha (2,790 acres) planted, while in perennial crops 1,697 ha (4,190 acres) were planted.

The crops with a planted area of more than 100 hectares in 2007 were:

- oranges: 6,500 ha (16,000 acres)
- pineapple: 230 ha (570 acres)
- sugarcane: 686 ha (1,700 acres)
- corn: 2,300 ha (5,700 acres)
- soybeans: 700 ha (1,700 acres)
- sorghum: 280 ha (690 acres)

== Health and education ==
In the health sector there were 02 health clinics and no hospitals. In the educational sector there were 11 primary schools and no middle schools.

- Municipal Human Development Index: 0.795 (2000)
- State ranking: 57 out of 853 municipalities as of 2000
- National ranking: 676 out of 5,138 municipalities as of 2000
- Literacy rate: 89%
- Life expectancy: 73 (average of males and females)

The highest ranking municipality in Minas Gerais in 2000 was Poços de Caldas with 0.841, while the lowest was Setubinha with 0.568. Nationally the highest was São Caetano do Sul in São Paulo with 0.919, while the lowest was Setubinha. In more recent statistics (considering 5,507 municipalities) Manari in the state of Pernambuco has the lowest rating in the country—0,467—putting it in last place.

== See also ==
- List of municipalities in Minas Gerais
