= Colômbia =

- Municipality
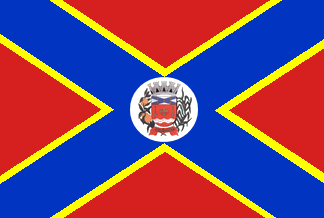
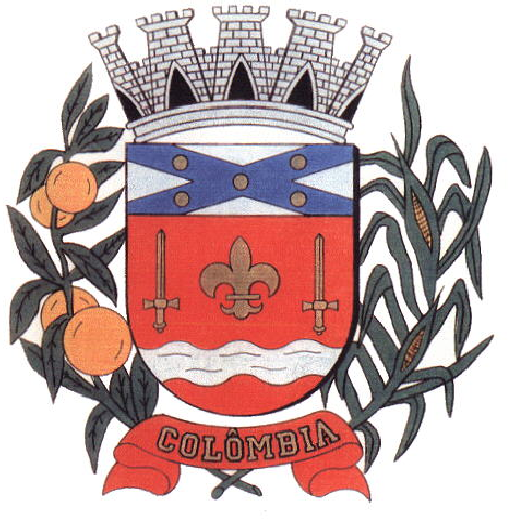
- Flag Coat of arms

- Location in São Paulo state

- Location in Brazil
- Coordinates: 20°10′33″S 48°41′20″W
- Country: Brazil
- Region: Southeast
- State: São Paulo
- Microregion: Barretos

Government
  - Mayor: Endrigo Lucas Gambarato Bertin (PTB)

Area
  - Total: 728.65 km^{2} (281.33 sq mi)

Population (2020)
  - Total: 6,216
  - Density: 8.531/km^{2} (22.09/sq mi)
- Time zone: UTC−3 (BRT)
- Website: www.colombia.sp.gov.br

Colômbia is a municipality in the northern part of the state of São Paulo in Brazil. The population is 6,216 (2020 est.) in an area of 728.65 km^{2} (281.33 sq mi). The elevation is 492 m. The bounding municipalities are Barretos to the south and Guaíra to the east. To the north, on the other side of the Rio Grande, is the state of Minas Gerais and the municipality of Planura.

== Religion ==
Christianity is present in the city as follows:

=== Catholic Church ===
The Catholic church in the municipality is part of the Roman Catholic Diocese of Barretos.

=== Protestant Church ===
The most diverse evangelical beliefs are present in the city, mainly Pentecostal, including the Assemblies of God in Brazil (the largest evangelical church in the country), Christian Congregation in Brazil, among others. These denominations are growing more and more throughout Brazil.

== See also ==
- List of municipalities in São Paulo
