= Pirajuba =

Town and municipality in the state of Minas Gerais, Brazil

Coordinates: 19°54′28″S 48°41′57″W

- Municipality
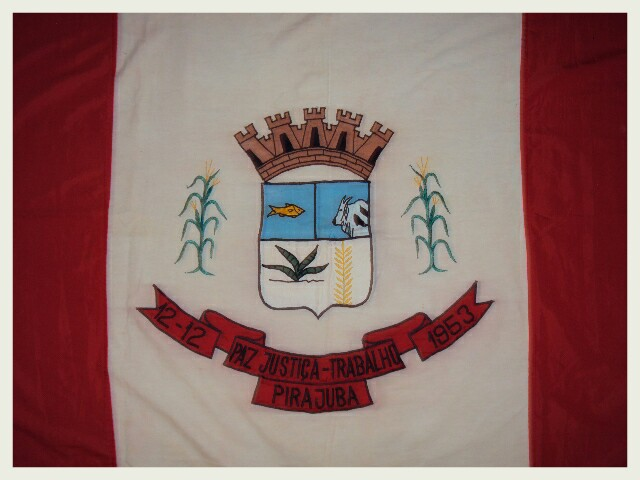
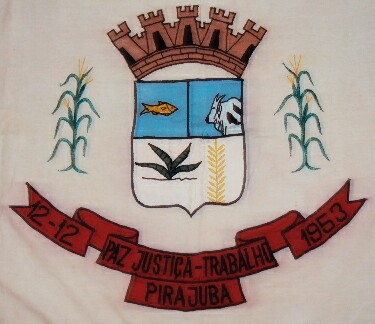
- Flag Coat of arms
- Interactive map of Pirajuba
- Country: Brazil
- State: Minas Gerais
- Region: Southeast
- Time zone: UTC−3 (BRT)

Location of Pirajuba in the state of Minas Gerais

Pirajuba is a municipality in the west of the Brazilian state of Minas Gerais. As of 2020, the population is 6,348 in a total area of 332 km^{2}. It became a municipality in 1953.

== Etymology ==
"Pirajuba" comes from the Tupi language and means "yellow fish", from pirá ("fish") and îub ("yellow").

== Geography ==
Pirajuba belongs to the statistical micro-region of Frutal. It is located in the center of the rich region of western Minas Gerais known as the Triângulo Mineiro at an elevation of 428 meters. Neighboring municipalities are:

- West: Frutal
- North: Comendador Gomes
- East: Conceição das Alagoas
- South: Planura

Important distances are:

- Belo Horizonte: 565 km
- Planura: 30 km
- Frutal: 50 km
- Uberaba: 138 km

== Economic activities ==
The most important economic activities are cattle raising, commerce, and agriculture. The GDP in 2005 was R$ R$78 million. Pirajuba is in the top tier of municipalities in the state with regard to economic and social development. As of 2007 there was 01 banking agency in the town. There was a small retail infrastructure serving the surrounding area of cattle and agricultural lands. There were 476 automobiles in all of the municipality, about one for every 8 inhabitants.

In the rural area there were 63 establishments occupying 15,000 hectares. About 800 persons were employed in agriculture. 28 of the farms had tractors, a ratio of one in two. There were 7,500 head of cattle in 2006, of which 5,000 head were dairy cows. In permanent crops there were 600 ha. planted, while in perennial crops 12,000 ha. were planted (2006). The crops with a planted area of more than 1,000 hectares were sugarcane, corn, and soybeans.

== Health and education ==
In the health sector there were 03 health clinics and no hospital. In the educational sector there were 02 primary schools and 01 middle school.

- Municipal Human Development Index: 0.786 (2000)
- State ranking: 95 out of 853 municipalities as of 2000
- National ranking: 917 out of 5,138 municipalities as of 2000
- Literacy rate: 88%
- Life expectancy: 73 (average of males and females)

The highest ranking municipality in Minas Gerais in 2000 was Poços de Caldas with 0.841, while the lowest was Setubinha with 0.568. Nationally the highest was São Caetano do Sul in São Paulo with 0.919, while the lowest was Setubinha. In more recent statistics (considering 5,507 municipalities) Manari in the state of Pernambuco has the lowest rating in the country—0,467—putting it in last place.

== See also ==
- List of municipalities in Minas Gerais
