= Paulo de Faria =

- Municipality
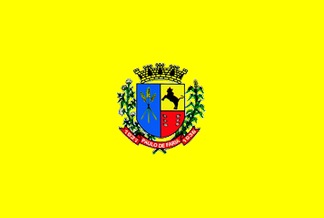
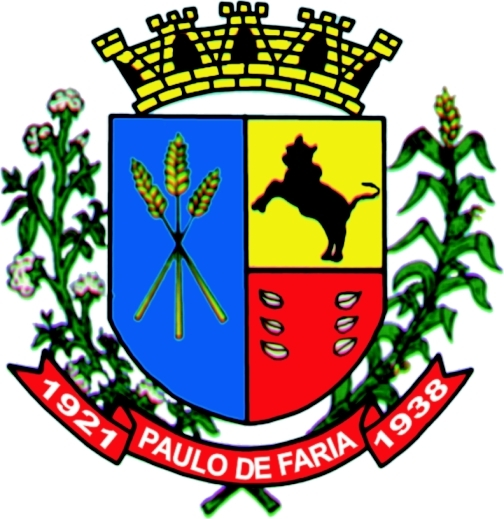
- Flag Coat of arms

- Location in São Paulo state

- Location in Brazil
- Coordinates: 20°01′49″S 49°23′40″W
- Country: Brazil
- Region: Southeast
- State: São Paulo
- Mesoregion: São José do Rio Preto

Area
  - Total: 738.4 km^{2} (285.1 sq mi)
- Elevation: 444 m (1,457 ft)

Population (2020)
  - Total: 8,959
  - Density: 12.13/km^{2} (31.42/sq mi)
- Time zone: UTC−3 (BRT)
- Postal code: 15490-000
- Area code: +55 17
- Website: Prefecture of Paulo de Faria

Paulo de Faria is a municipality in the state of São Paulo, Brazil. The city has a population of 8,959 inhabitants and an area of 738.4 km^{2} (285.1 sq mi). Paulo de Faria belongs to the Mesoregion of São José do Rio Preto.

== History ==
The municipality was created by state law in 1938.

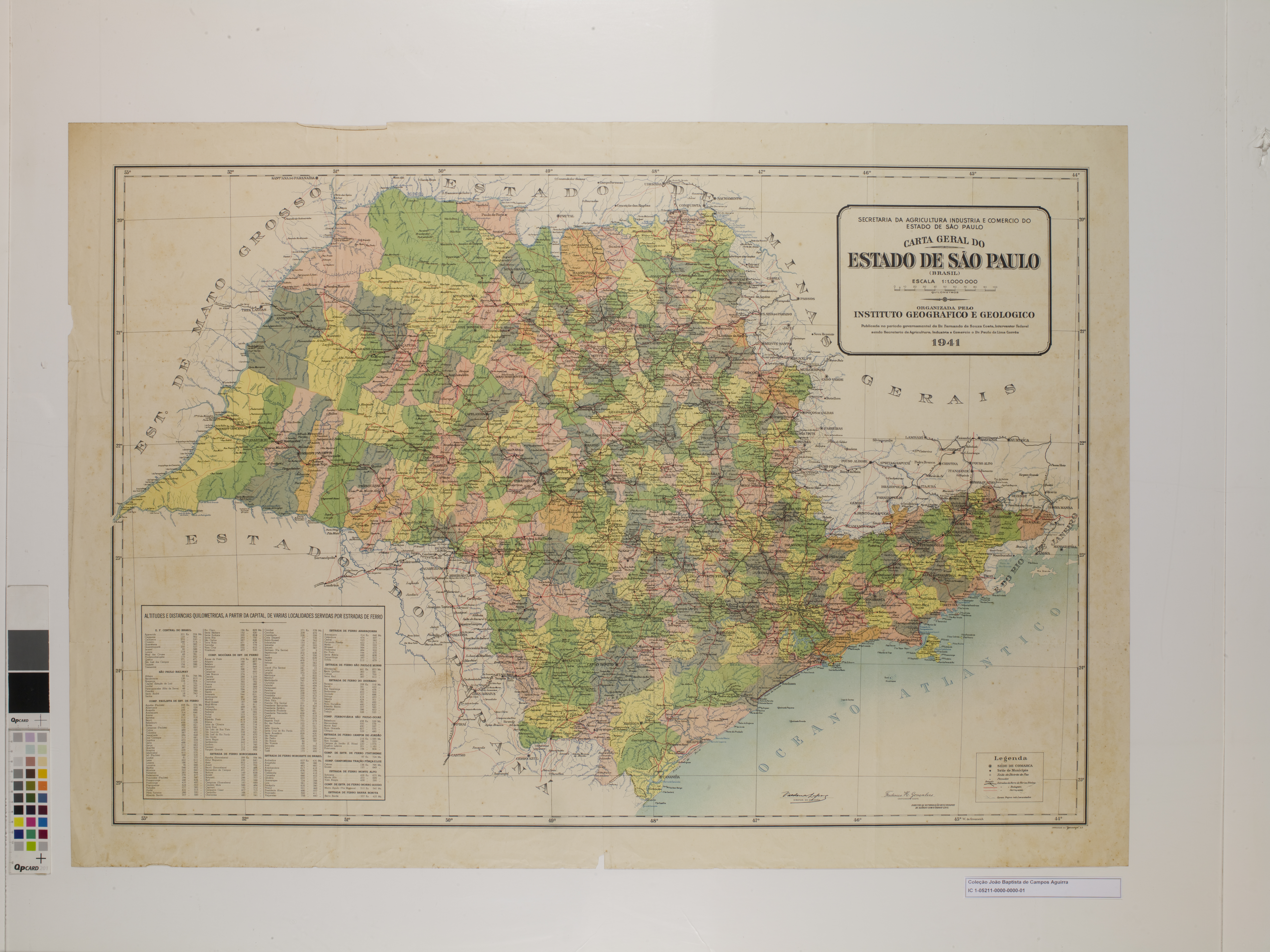
Map of the state of São Paulo (1938).

== Media ==
In telecommunications, the city was served by Companhia Telefônica Brasileira until 1973, when it began to be served by Telecomunicações de São Paulo. In July 1998, this company was acquired by Telefónica, which adopted the Vivo brand in 2012.

The company is currently an operator of cell phones, fixed lines, internet (fiber optics/4G) and television (satellite and cable).

== Ecological estate ==
The ecological estate founded under the decree 17,724 (June 23, 1981) is a stational floral park and covers an area of 435 ha (4.35 km²). Situated by the Grande River (near Água Vermelha), characterizes several hills with the elevations around 400 to 495 m. The flowers features jatobá among others.

== See also ==
- List of municipalities in São Paulo
- Interior of São Paulo
