= Planura =

Town and municipality in the state of Minas Gerais, Brazil

Coordinates: 20°08′50″S 48°41′52″W

- Municipality
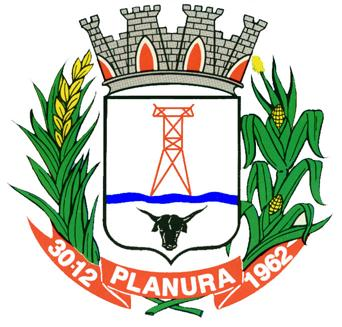
- Coat of arms
- Interactive map of Planura
- Country: Brazil
- State: Minas Gerais
- Region: Southeast
- Time zone: UTC−3 (BRT)

Location of Planura in the state of Minas Gerais

Planura is a municipality in the west of the Brazilian state of Minas Gerais. As of 2020 the population was 12,292 in a total area of 318 km^{2}. It became a municipality in 1962.

== Geography ==
Planura belongs to the statistical micro-region of Frutal. It is located in the center of the rich region of western Minas Gerais known as the Triângulo Mineiro at an elevation of 492 meters. The Rio Grande, dammed to form the Represa de Porto Colômbia, forms the southern boundary. Neighboring municipalities are:

- West: Frutal
- North: Pirajuba
- East: Conceição das Alagoas
- South: Colômbia in the state of São Paulo

Important distances are:

- Belo Horizonte: 578 km
- Pirajuba: 30 km
- Frutal: 37 km
- Uberaba: 110 km

== History ==
The first settlement began on lands belonging to João Januário da Silva e Oliveira, on the banks of the Rio Grande. The first group of houses was known as Porto do Cemitério, later changing the name to Esplanada. In 1938 it became a district of Frutal with the name Nova Esplanada. In 1962 it became a municipality. The growth of the town has been due to the building of the Usina Hidrelétrica de Porto Colômbia, in the 1970s. The name is due to the flat lands of the region.

== Economic activities ==
The most important economic activities are cattle raising, commerce, royalties from the Porto Colômba hydroelectric station, and agriculture. The GDP in 2005 was R$433 million, half of which came from industry. Planura is in the top tier of municipalities in the state with regard to economic and social development. As of 2007, there was one banking agency in the town. There was a small retail infrastructure serving the surrounding area of cattle and agricultural lands. There were 1,106 automobiles in all of the municipality, about one for every 10 inhabitants.

In the rural area there were 75 establishments occupying 76,000 hectares. About 300 persons were employed in agriculture. 41 of the farms had tractors, a ratio of one in two. There were 6,000 head of cattle in 2006, of which 2,500 head were dairy cows. In permanent crops there were 8,000 ha planted, while in perennial crops 8,300 ha were planted (in 2006). The crops with a planted area of more than 1,000 hectares were sugarcane, corn, and soybeans. The production of vegetables is aided by the abundance of water in the region, available from the Usina de Porto Colômbia. Planura is one of the largest producers of cucumber, red pepper and tomatoes in the state.

== Health and education ==
In the health sector there were 03 health clinics and no hospital. In the educational sector there were 04 primary schools and 02 middle schools.

- Municipal Human Development Index: 0.779 (2000)
- State ranking: 121 out of 853 municipalities as of 2000
- National ranking: 1,088 out of 5,138 municipalities as of 2000
- Literacy rate: 89%
- Life expectancy: 73 (average of males and females)

The highest ranking municipality in Minas Gerais in 2000 was Poços de Caldas with 0.841, while the lowest was Setubinha with 0.568. Nationally the highest was São Caetano do Sul in São Paulo with 0.919, while the lowest was Setubinha. In more recent statistics (considering 5,507 municipalities) Manari in the state of Pernambuco has the lowest rating in the country—0,467—putting it in last place.

== See also ==
- List of municipalities in Minas Gerais
