= Limeira do Oeste =

- Municipality
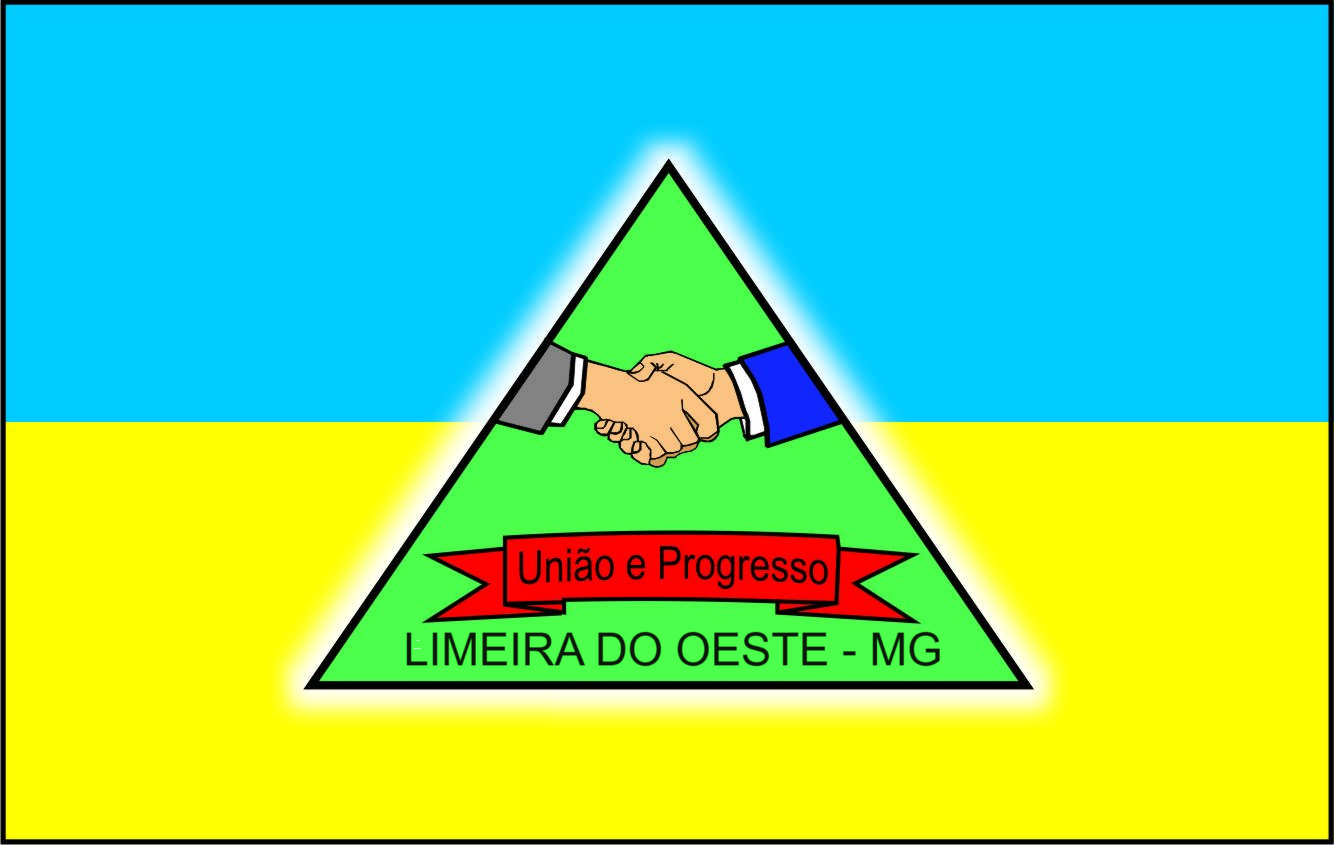
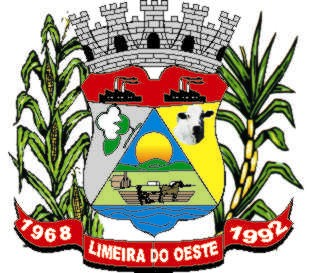
- Flag Coat of arms

- Location of the municipality in Minas Gerais
- Coordinates: 19°33′03″S 50°34′51″W
- Country: Brazil
- State: Minas Gerais
- Mesoregion: Triângulo Mineiro e Alto Paranaíba
- Microregion: Frutal
- Founded: 29 June 1968

Government
  - Prefect: Pedro Socorro do Nascimento (PR)

Area
  - Total: 1,317 km^{2} (508 sq mi)

Population (2020)
  - Total: 7,589
  - Density: 5.762/km^{2} (14.92/sq mi)
- Time zone: UTC−3 (BRT)

Limeira do Oeste is a municipality in the west of the Brazilian state of Minas Gerais. As of 2020 the population was 7,589 in a total area of 1,318 km^{2}. It became a municipality in 1993.

== Geography ==
Limeira do Oeste belongs to the statistical micro-region of Frutal. It is located in the extreme west of the rich region of western Minas Gerais known as the Triângulo Mineiro at an elevation of 428 meters. Neighboring municipalities are:

- West: Paranaíba in Mato Grosso do Sul
- Northwest: Itarumã in Goiás
- North: São Simão in Goiás
- Northeast: Santa Vitória
- East: União de Minas
- South: Carneirinho

== Economy ==
The most important economic activities are cattle raising, commerce, and agriculture. The GDP in 2005 was R$ R$32 million. Limeira do Oeste is in the top tier of municipalities in the state with regard to economic and social development. As of 2007 there was 01 banking agency in the town. There was a well-developed retail infrastructure serving the surrounding area of cattle and agricultural lands. There were 751 automobiles in all of the municipality, about one for every 9 inhabitants.

Limeira do Oeste is an important agricultural producer, especially of meat, dairy products and sugarcane. In the rural area there were 744 establishments occupying 124,000 hectares. About 2,000 persons were employed in agriculture. 164 of the farms had tractors, a ratio of one in four. There were 135,000 head of cattle in 2006, of which 22,000 head were dairy cows. In permanent crops there were 3,000 ha. planted, while in perennial crops 4,000 ha. were planted (2006). The crops with a planted area of more than 100 hectares were rice, sugarcane, corn, and soybeans.

== Health and education ==
In the health sector there were 05 health clinics and no hospital. In the educational sector there were 04 primary schools and 01 middle school.

- Municipal Human Development Index: 0.751 (2000)
- State ranking: 275 out of 853 municipalities as of 2000
- National ranking: 512 out of 5,138 municipalities as of 2000
- Literacy rate: 82%
- Life expectancy: 73 (average of males and females)

== See also ==
- List of municipalities in Minas Gerais
