= Guaraci =

God of the Sun of the Guaraní mythology

Guaraci or Quaraci (from Tupi kûarasý, "sun") in the Guaraní mythology is the god of the Sun, creator of all living creatures.

== See also ==
- List of solar deities
