= TV Integração Uberlândia =

TV Integração Uberlândia (ZYA 724)
Uberlândia, Minas Gerais; Brazil
- Channels: Digital: 18; Virtual: 8
- Branding: TV Integração

Programming
- Affiliations: TV Globo

Ownership
- Owner: Grupo Integração; (Rádio e Televisão de Uberlândia Ltda.)

History
- First air date: May 1, 1964
- Former names: TV Triângulo (1964-1995); TV Integração (1995-2001); Rede Integração Uberlândia (2001-2009)
- Former channel numbers: Analog: 8 (VHF, 1964–2018)
- Former affiliations: TV Excelsior (1964-1970); REI (1969-1971)

Technical information
- Licensing authority: ANATEL
- ERP: 2.5 kW
- Transmitter coordinates: 18°53′5.7″S 48°15′42.2″W

Links
- Public license information: Profile
- Website: redeglobo.globo.com/mg/tvintegracao

TV Integração Uberlândia (channel 8) is a Brazilian television station based in Uberlândia, Minas Gerais serving as an affiliate of the TV Globo network for the eastern portion of the state. The channel serves as the flagship broadcasting property of the Rede Integração network, which has three other stations covering western Minas Gerais.

== History ==
The station's construction permit was granted in 1962. TV Triângulo started broadcasting in 1964, after studying the potential for a television station in Uberlândia. In 1967, the station premiered A Marcha do Mundo, a local newscast that lasted until the early 70s. The station covered the 1970 FIFA World Cup and signed an agreement with Walter Clark to bring Jornal Nacional, as well as programs from Jô Soares and Chacrinha, before becoming a Globo affiliate in 1971. It also premiered the first Brazilian newscast for children, Dente de Leite.

When the station was aligned with REI, it broadcast Record's telenovelas. Occasionally, Record would send the wrong tape, which ruined the logic of the story lines.

Upon joining TV Globo in 1971, the station took part of the creation of the network's affiliate system. Negotiations to air Globo's football matches from Rio started in 1972. A film lab was inaugurated in 1974. In 1980 the local edition of Jornal Hoje premiered followed in 1981 by the local Jornal das Sete. These two were replaced by MGTV in 1983.

Over time, new stations in the inland area of Minas appeared, with the attempt of forming a regional network. These stations began adopting the name Rede Integração in the first half of the 90s, before completing the process in 1995. TV Triângulo became its flagship station.
