= Intermediate Geographic Region of Uberaba =

Interurban administrative region in Minas Gerais, Brazil

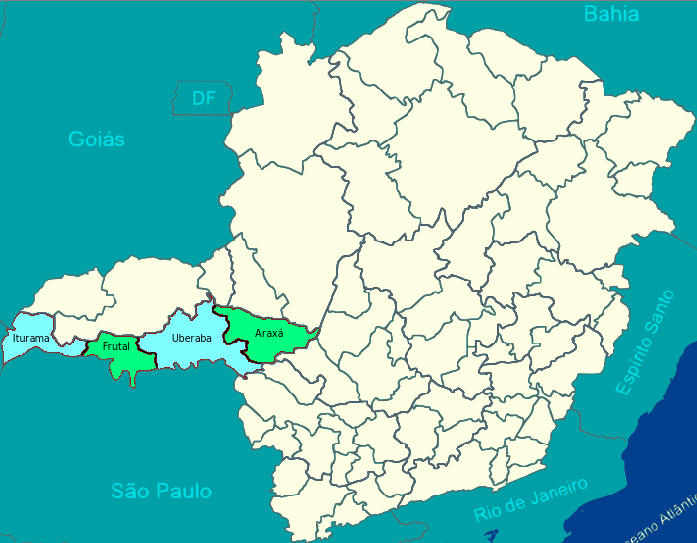
Location of the Intermediate Geographic Region of Uberaba, in Minas Gerais, Brazil.

The Intermediate Geographic Region of Uberaba (code 3110) is one of the 13 intermediate geographic regions in the Brazilian state of Minas Gerais, as well as one of the 134 regions in Brazil. It was designated by the National Institute of Geography and Statistics (IBGE) in 2017.

As of September 2021, the region covers a total area of 36,915.2 km^{2} (14,253.0 sq mi) and is home to a population of 825,582 residents.

It comprises 29 municipalities, which are organized into 4 immediate geographic regions:

- Immediate Geographic Region of Uberaba.
- Immediate Geographic Region of Araxá.
- Immediate Geographic Region of Frutal.
- Immediate Geographic Region of Iturama.

== See also ==
- List of Intermediate and Immediate Geographic Regions of Minas Gerais
