= Immediate Geographic Region of Monte Carmelo =

Urban administrative region in Minas Gerais, Brazil

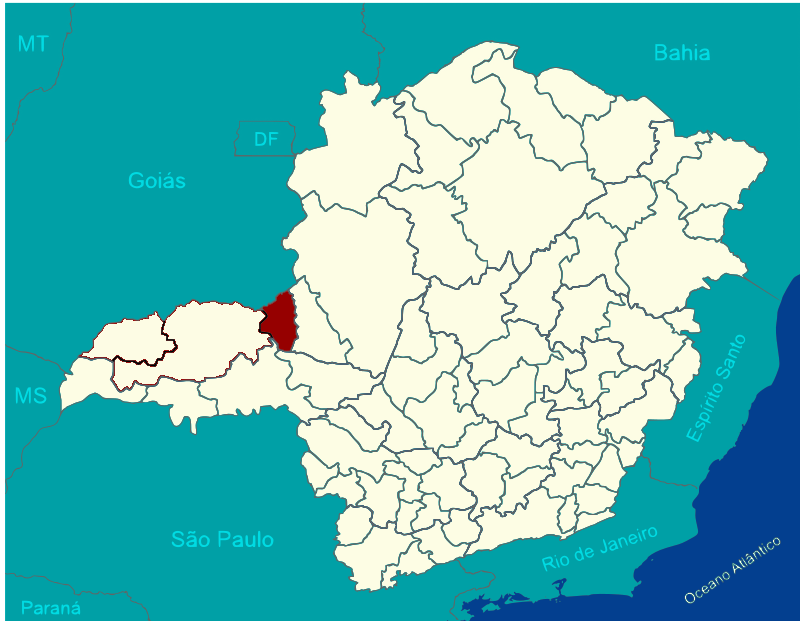
Immediate Geographic Region of Monte Carmelo, in the state of Minas Gerais, Brazil.

The Immediate Geographic Region of Monte Carmelo is one of the 3 immediate geographic regions in the Intermediate Geographic Region of Uberlândia.

It is one of the 70 immediate geographic regions in the Brazilian state of Minas Gerais and one of the 509 of Brazil.

It was created by the National Institute of Geography and Statistics (IBGE) in 2017.

== Municipalities ==
It comprises seven municipalities:

- Abadia dos Dourados
- Douradoquara
- Estrela do Sul
- Grupiara
- Iraí de Minas
- Monte Carmelo
- Romaria

== See also ==
- List of Intermediate and Immediate Geographic Regions of Minas Gerais
