= Cascalho Rico =

Town and municipality in Minas Gerais, Brazil

Coordinates: 18°34′33″S 47°52′37″W

- Municipality
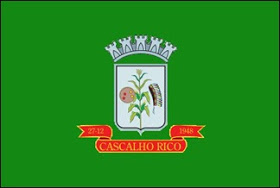
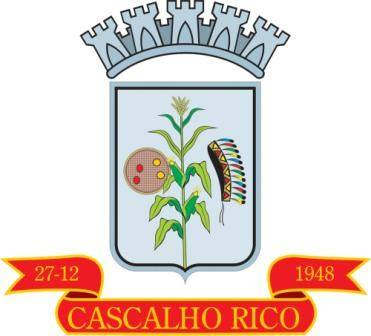
- Flag Coat of arms
- Interactive map of Cascalho Rico
- Country: Brazil
- State: Minas Gerais
- Region: Southeast
- Time zone: UTC−3 (BRT)

Location of Cascalho Rico in the state of Minas Gerais, Brazil

Cascalho Rico is a Brazilian municipality located in the west of the state of Minas Gerais. Its population as of 2020 was 3,092 living in a total area of 368 km^{2}. The city belongs to the statistical mesoregion of Triângulo Mineiro and Alto Paranaíba and to the statistical microregion of Uberlândia. It became a municipality in 1948.

== Geography ==
Cascalho Rico is located at an elevation of 692 meters in the rich region known as the Triângulo Mineiro. It is east of Uberlândia and borders on the southern banks of the great hydroelectric station and reservoir of Emborcação.

The distance to Araguari is 45 km; the distance to Uberlândia is 75 km; and the distance to Belo Horizonte is 564 km. Neighboring municipalities are: the state of Goiás (N); Araguari (W); Estrela do Sul(S); Grupiara and Estrela do Sul(E)

== Economy ==
The main economic activity is industry, with royalties from the Emborcação hydroelectric power plant. There is also a large milk products factory. The GDP in 2005 was R$758,797,000.00, with 33,000,000.00 from services, 560,000,000.00 from industry, and 13,800,000.00 from agriculture. The GDP per capita was the highest in Brazil in 2005. There were 291 rural producers on 22,000 hectares of land. 21 farms had tractors. The main crops were coffee, corn, and soybeans. There were 23,000 head of cattle (2006) and 115,000 chickens. More than half of the cattle were dairy cows.

== Municipal social indicators ==
The social indicators rank it in the top tier of municipalities in the state.

- Municipal Human Development Index: 0.788 (2000)
- State ranking: 81 out of 853 municipalities as of 2000
- National ranking: 862 out of 5,138 municipalities as of 2000
- Literacy rate: 92%
- Life expectancy: 74 (average of males and females)

The highest ranking municipality in Minas Gerais in 2000 was Poços de Caldas with 0.841, while the lowest was Setubinha with 0.568. Nationally the highest was São Caetano do Sul in São Paulo with 0.919, while the lowest was Setubinha. In more recent statistics (considering 5,507 municipalities) Manari in the state of Pernambuco has the lowest rating in the country—0,467—putting it in last place.

== See also ==
- List of municipalities in Minas Gerais
