= Romaria =

Brazilian municipality in Minas Gerais

Coordinates: 18°52′58″S 47°35′10″W

- Municipality
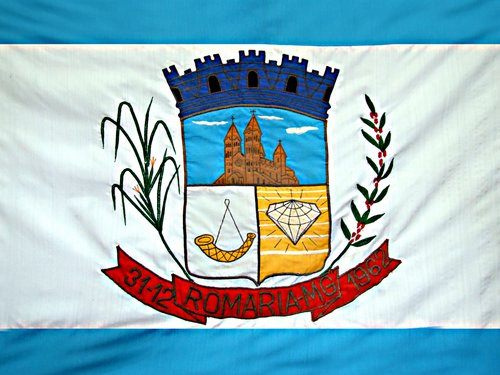
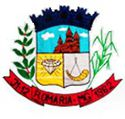
- Flag Coat of arms
- Interactive map of Romaria
- Country: Brazil
- State: Minas Gerais
- Region: Southeast
- Time zone: UTC−3 (BRT)

Location of Romaria in the state of Minas Gerais

Romaria is a Brazilian municipality located in the northwest of the state of Minas Gerais. Its population as of 2020 was 3,520 people living in a total area of 402 km^{2}. The city belongs to the mesoregion of Triângulo Mineiro e Alto Paranaiba and to the microregion of Patrocínio. It became a municipality in 1962.

== Geography ==
The municipality is located in the region of the Alto Paranaíba, just north of the important federal highway BR-365, which links the state boundary of Goiás to Montes Claros. The elevation of the town center is 960 meters. Neighboring municipalities are: Estrela do Sul and Monte Carmelo (N); Iraí de Minas (E); Nova Ponte and Indianópolis (S); Araguari (W).

=== Distances ===
- Monte Carmelo: 20 km
- Patrocínio: 75 km
- Uberlândia: 75 km
- Belo Horizonte: 511 km

== History ==
Água Suja, today Romaria, began as a settlement during the War of Paraguay, when some prospectors found diamonds. The first stone was discovered in 1857 in the Agua Suja stream, a tributary of the Bagagem River. A chapel was built to honor Our Lady of Abadia and an image was brought from Portugal. By 1926 there were already around fifty thousand pilgrims (romeiros) coming to worship the statue of the Virgin and the construction of a sanctuary was begun. The celebration takes place from August 6 to 15 and it attracts thousands of pilgrims who fill the small town.

== Economic activities ==
The most important economic activities are cattle raising for meat and dairy, commerce, and agriculture, with the main crops being coffee, corn, rice, and citrus fruits. The GDP in 2005 was R$70 million, with 16 million generated by services, 03 million generated by industry, and 48 million generated by agriculture. Romaria is in the middle tier of municipalities in the state with regard to economic and social development. As of 2007 there were no banking agencies in the town. There was a modest retail infrastructure serving the surrounding area of cattle and agricultural lands. There were 391 automobiles in all of the municipality (2007), about one for every 08 inhabitants.

Romaria has a small municipal area but had a large agricultural production especially in coffee, corn, and soybeans. In the rural area there were 175 establishments (2006) occupying 27,000 hectares (planted area: 14,000 ha.; natural pasture: 7,000 ha.; and woodland: 5,000 ha.). About 2,000 persons were dependent on agriculture. 68 of the farms had tractors, a ratio of one in 03 farms. There were 7,700 head of cattle in 2006. The main crops were coffee (5,200 hectares), corn (6,500 hectares), cotton, peas, beans, passion fruit, rice, and soybeans (9,500 hectares).

== Health and education ==
In the health sector there were 02 health clinics and 01 hospital with 16 beds. In the educational sector there was 01 pre-primary schools, 02 primary school, and 01 middle school.

- Municipal Human Development Index: 0.775 (2000)
- State ranking: 139 out of 853 municipalities as of 2000
- National ranking: 1,196 out of 5,138 municipalities as of 2000
- Literacy rate: 90%
- Life expectancy: 71 (average of males and females)

The highest ranking municipality in Minas Gerais in 2000 was Poços de Caldas with 0.841, while the lowest was Setubinha with 0.568. Nationally the highest was São Caetano do Sul in São Paulo with 0.919, while the lowest was Setubinha. In more recent statistics (considering 5,507 municipalities) Manari in the state of Pernambuco has the lowest rating in the country—0,467—putting it in last place.

== See also ==
- List of municipalities in Minas Gerais
