= Immediate Geographic Region of Patrocínio =

Urban administrative region in Minas Gerais, Brazil

The Immediate Geographic Region of Patrocínio is one of the 3 immediate geographic regions in the Intermediate Geographic Region of Patos de Minas, one of the 70 immediate geographic regions in the Brazilian state of Minas Gerais and one of the 509 of Brazil, created by the National Institute of Geography and Statistics (IBGE) in 2017.

== Municipalities ==
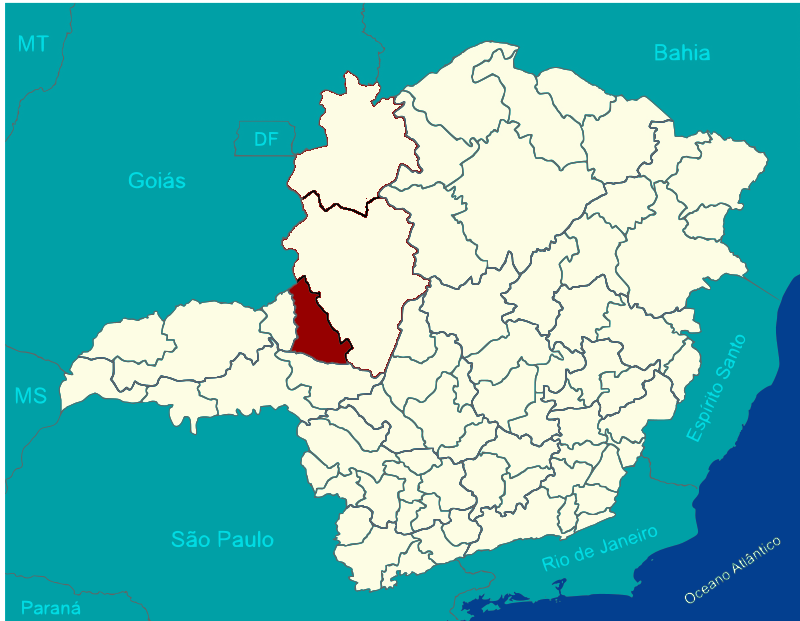
Immediate Geographic Region of Patrocínio, in the state of Minas Gerais, Brazil.

It comprises 5 municipalities.

- Coromandel
- Cruzeiro da Fortaleza
- Guimarânia
- Patrocínio
- Serra do Salitre
