= Estrela do Sul =

Municipality in Minas Gerais, Brazil

Coordinates: 18°44′45″S 47°41′34″W

- Municipality
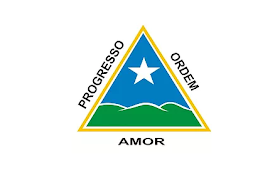
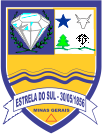
- Flag Coat of arms
- Interactive map of Estrela do Sul
- Country: Brazil
- State: Minas Gerais
- Region: Southeast
- Time zone: UTC−3 (BRT)

Location of Estrela do Sul in the state of Minas Gerais

Estrela do Sul is a Brazilian municipality located in the northwest of the state of Minas Gerais. Its population as of 2020 was 8,018 people living in a total area of 820 km^{2}. The city belongs to the mesoregion of Triângulo Mineiro e Alto Paranaiba and to the microregion of Patrocínio. It became a municipality in 1856.

== Geography ==
The municipality is located in the region of the Alto Paranaíba, on the edge of the Emborcação Reservoir, which dams up the Paranaíba River. The elevation of the town center is 713 meters. Highway connections are made by MG-223, which connects south to BR-365. Neighboring municipalities are: Grupiara and Cascalho Rico (N); Araguari (E); Indianópolis and Nova Ponte (S); Iraí and Monte Carmelo (W).

=== Distances ===
- Monte Carmelo: 28 km
- Coromandel: 77 km
- Araguari: 65 km
- Uberlândia: 90 km
- Belo Horizonte: 514 km

== History ==
Settled in 1772 by the bandeirante João Leite da Silva Ortiz, on one of his expeditions into Goiás, Estrela do Sul, is considered one of the most preserved historical cities in Minas Gerais. Here was found one of the largest diamonds in the world, the Estrela do Sul; here is buried Dona Beija, the famous lady of Imperial Brazil. This is the only city in the Triângulo Mineiro which still preserves houses from the colonial period of Brazil. The city became known after 1984 when the Rosa brothers, a teacher, a film-maker, and a journalist, brought it into the national limelight as a historical site. In 1997, Pedro Divio Rosa wrote “Dona Beija”, which traces the history of the historical character.

== Economic activities ==
The most important economic activities are cattle raising, commerce, and agriculture. The GDP in 2005 was R$ R$63 million, with 23 million generated by services, 03 million generated by industry, and 35 million generated by agriculture. Estrela do Sul is in the middle tier of municipalities in the state with regard to economic and social development. As of 2007 there was one banking agency in the town. There was a modest retail infrastructure serving the surrounding area of cattle and agricultural lands. There were 726 automobiles in all of the municipality (2007), about one for every 10 inhabitants.

Estrela do Sul has a small municipal area and therefore little available land for agriculture. In the rural area there were 492 establishments (2006) occupying 103,000 hectares (planted area—10,000 ha, natural pasture—33,000 ha., and woodland—55,000 ha.). About 1,600 persons were dependent on agriculture. 117 of the farms had tractors, a ratio of one in 04 farms. There were 55,000 head of cattle in 2006. The main crops were coffee (2,200 ha.), corn (4,500 ha.), rice, and soybeans (4,000 ha.).

== Health and education ==
In the health sector there were 05 health clinics and 01 hospital with 12 beds. In the educational sector there were 10 pre-primary schools, 10 primary schools, and 01 middle school.

- Municipal Human Development Index: 0.746 (2000)
- State ranking: 314 out of 853 municipalities as of 2000
- National ranking: 1,985 out of 5,138 municipalities as of 2000
- Literacy rate: 86%
- Life expectancy: 73 (average of males and females)
- Infant mortality rate: 16.26 in 1,000 live births (1998)

The highest ranking municipality in Minas Gerais in 2000 was Poços de Caldas with 0.841, while the lowest was Setubinha with 0.568. Nationally the highest was São Caetano do Sul in São Paulo with 0.919, while the lowest was Setubinha. In more recent statistics (considering 5,507 municipalities) Manari in the state of Pernambuco has the lowest rating in the country—0,467—putting it in last place.

== See also ==
- List of municipalities in Minas Gerais
