= Indianópolis =

Town and municipality in the state of Minas Gerais, Brazil

Coordinates: 19°02′20″S 47°55′01″W

- Municipality
- Interactive map of Indianópolis
- Country: Brazil
- State: Minas Gerais
- Region: Southeast
- Time zone: UTC−3 (BRT)

Location of Indianópolis in the state of Minas Gerais, Brazil

Indianópolis is a Brazilian municipality located in the west of the state of Minas Gerais. Its population as of 2020 was 6,951 living in a total area of 834 km^{2} (322 sq mi). The city belongs to the statistical mesoregion of Triângulo Mineiro and Alto Paranaíba and to the statistical microregion of Uberlândia. It became a municipality in 1938.

== Geography ==
Indianópolis is located at an elevation of 809 meters in the rich region known as the Triângulo Mineiro. It is east of Uberlândia. Federal highway BR-365, which links the state boundary of Goiás to Pirapora in the north passes 16 kilometers north of the town.

The distance to Uberlândia is 59 km; and the distance to Belo Horizonte is 545 km. Neighboring municipalities are: Araguari and Estrela do Sul (N); Uberlândia (W); Uberaba (S); Nova Ponte (E).

== Economy ==
The main economic activity is industry. There is a Dow Chemical plant in the municipality. The GDP in 2005 was R$303,135,000.00, with 35,000,000.00 from services, 162,000,000.00 from industry, and 60,000,000.00 from agriculture. There were 422 rural producers on 34,000 hectares of land. 178 farms had tractors. The main crops were coffee, bananas, rubber, rice, beans, sorghum, corn, and soybeans. There were 19,000 head of cattle (2006) and 643,000 heads of poultry.

== Municipal social indicators ==
The social indicators rank it in the top tier of municipalities in the state.

- Municipal Human Development Index: 0.764 (2000)
- State ranking: 192 out of 853 municipalities as of 2000
- National ranking: 1,469 out of 5,138 municipalities as of 2000
- Literacy rate: 87%
- Life expectancy: 72 (average of males and females)

The highest ranking municipality in Minas Gerais in 2000 was Poços de Caldas with 0.841, while the lowest was Setubinha with 0.568. Nationally the highest was São Caetano do Sul in São Paulo with 0.919, while the lowest was Setubinha. In more recent statistics (considering 5,507 municipalities) Manari in the state of Pernambuco has the lowest rating in the country—0,467—putting it in last place.

== See also ==
- List of municipalities in Minas Gerais
