= Douradoquara =

Town and municipality in the state of Minas Gerais, Brazil

Coordinates: 18°25′51″S 47°36′32″W

- Municipality
- Interactive map of Douradoquara
- Country: Brazil
- State: Minas Gerais
- Region: Southeast
- Time zone: UTC−3 (BRT)

Location of Douradoquara in the state of Minas Gerais

Doradoquara is a Brazilian municipality located in the northwest of the state of Minas Gerais. Its population as of 2020 was 1,912 people living in a total area of 313 km^{2} (121 sq mi). The city belongs to the mesoregion of Triângulo Mineiro e Alto Paranaiba and to the microregion of Patrocínio. It became a municipality in 1962.

== Geography ==
The municipality is located in the region of the Alto Paranaíba, on the edge of the Emborcação Reservoir, which dams up the Paranaíba River. The elevation of the town center is 713 meters. Highway connections are made by BR-352, which connects to MG-190. Neighboring municipalities are: Catalão (N), Abadia dos Dourados (E) Monte Carmelo (S), and Grupiara (W).

=== Distances ===
- Monte Carmelo: 47 km
- Coromandel: 72 km
- Patrocínio: 111 km
- Patos de Minas: 183 km
- Belo Horizonte: 514 km

== Economic activities ==
The most important economic activities are cattle raising, commerce, and agriculture. The GDP in 2005 was R$ R$13 million, with 19 million generated by services, 01 million generated by industry, and 04 million generated by agriculture. Douradoquara is in the top tier of municipalities in the state with regard to economic and social development. As of 2007 there were no banking agencies in the town. There was a modest retail infrastructure serving the surrounding area of cattle and agricultural lands. There were 255 automobiles in all of the municipality (2007), about one for every 07 inhabitants.

Douradoquara has a small municipal area and therefore little available land for agriculture. In the rural area there were 241 establishments (2006) occupying 20,000 hectares (planted area—1,000 ha, and natural pasture—16,000 ha.). About 420 persons were dependent on agriculture. 22 of the farms had tractors, a ratio of one in 10 farms. There were 15,000 head of cattle in 2006. The main crops were coffee, corn, rice, and soybeans.

== Health and education ==
In 2006 there was one health clinic, one pre-school, one primary school and one middle school.

- Municipal Human Development Index: 0.776 (2000)
- State ranking: 131 out of 853 municipalities as of 2000
- National ranking: 1,155 out of 5,138 municipalities as of 2000
- Literacy rate: 87%
- Life expectancy: 73 (average of males and females)

The highest ranking municipality in Minas Gerais in 2000 was Poços de Caldas with 0.841, while the lowest was Setubinha with 0.568. Nationally the highest was São Caetano do Sul in São Paulo with 0.919, while the lowest was Setubinha. In more recent statistics (considering 5,507 municipalities) Manari in the state of Pernambuco has the lowest rating in the country—0,467—putting it in last place.

== See also ==
- List of municipalities in Minas Gerais
