= Grupiara =

Town and municipality in the state of Minas Gerais, Brazil

Coordinates: 18°29′38″S 47°43′19″W

- Municipality
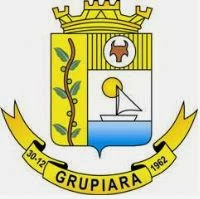
- Coat of arms
- Interactive map of Grupiara
- Country: Brazil
- State: Minas Gerais
- Region: Southeast
- Time zone: UTC−3 (BRT)

Location of Grupiara in the state of Minas Gerais

Grupiara is a Brazilian municipality located in the northwest of the state of Minas Gerais. Its population as of 2020 was 1,387 people living in a total area of 192 km^{2} (74 sq mi). The city belongs to the mesoregion of Triângulo Mineiro e Alto Paranaiba and to the microregion of Patrocínio. It became a municipality in 1962.

== Geography ==
The municipality is located in the region of the Alto Paranaíba, on the edge of the Emborcação Reservoir, which dams up the Paranaíba River. More than half of the municipal territory is covered by water seriously limiting agricultural production. The elevation of the town center is 713 meters. Highway connections are made by local road to MG-223, which connects to BR-050 north of Araguari. Neighboring municipalities are: Catalão (N), Douradoquara (E) Monte Carmelo and Estrela do Sul(S), and Catalão (W).

=== Distances ===
- Monte Carmelo: 65 km
- Araguari: 100 km
- Uberlândia: 130 km
- Belo Horizonte: 553 km

Until the 1990s Grupiara was on the railroad line of the RFFSA and had its own station. With the flooding to make the Emborcação Reservoir in the 1990s the line was discontinued and moved further east to Araguari. The railroad station is now under water.

== Economic activities ==
The most important economic activities are cattle raising for meat and dairy, commerce, and agriculture, with the main crops being coffee, corn, rice, and citrus fruits. The GDP in 2005 was R$11 million 800 thousand, with 06 million generated by services, five hundred thousand generated by industry, and 04 million, 500 thousand generated by agriculture. Grupiara is in the middle tier of municipalities in the state with regard to economic and social development. As of 2007 there were no banking agencies in the town. There was a modest retail infrastructure serving the surrounding area of cattle and agricultural lands. There were 158 automobiles in all of the municipality (2007), about one for every 09 inhabitants.

Grupiara has a small municipal area and therefore little available land for agriculture. In the rural area there were 104 establishments (2006) occupying 11,000 hectares (planted area: 900 ha.; natural pasture: 8,200 ha.; and woodland: 1,600 ha.). About 250 persons were dependent on agriculture. 19 of the farms had tractors, a ratio of one in 05 farms. There were 9,000 head of cattle in 2006. The main crops were coffee, corn, rice, and soybeans .

== Health and education ==
In the health sector there was 01 health clinic. In the educational sector there was 01 pre-primary schools, 01 primary school, and 01 middle school.

Grupiara is in the top tier of municipalities in the state with regard to economic and social development.

- Municipal Human Development Index: 0.779 (2000)
- State ranking: 123 out of 853 municipalities as of 2000
- National ranking: 1,098 out of 5,138 municipalities as of 2000
- Literacy rate: 89%
- Life expectancy: 73 (average of males and females)

The highest ranking municipality in Minas Gerais in 2000 was Poços de Caldas with 0.841, while the lowest was Setubinha with 0.568. Nationally the highest was São Caetano do Sul in São Paulo with 0.919, while the lowest was Setubinha. In more recent statistics (considering 5,507 municipalities) Manari in the state of Pernambuco has the lowest rating in the country—0,467—putting it in last place.

== See also ==
- List of municipalities in Minas Gerais
