= Sacramento, Minas Gerais =

Municipality in Brazil

Coordinates: 19°51′54″S 47°26′24″W

- Municipality
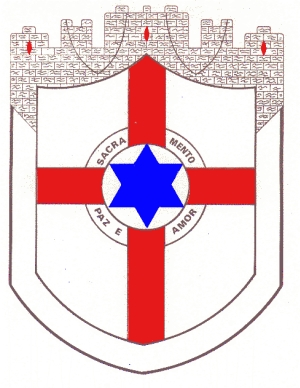
- Flag Coat of arms
- Interactive map of Sacramento, Minas Gerais
- Country: Brazil
- State: Minas Gerais
- Region: Southeast
- Time zone: UTC−3 (BRT)

Location of Sacramento

Sacramento is a Brazilian municipality located in the west of the state of Minas Gerais. Its population as of 2020 was 26,374 people living in a total area of 3,071 km^{2}. The city belongs to the meso-region of Triângulo Mineiro and Alto Paranaíba and to the micro-region of Araxá. It became a municipality in 1820.

== Geography ==
Sacramento is located at an elevation of 832 (city center) meters, in the Rio das Velhas valley. Neighboring municipalities are: Perdizes (N), Araxá and Tapira (NE), São Roque de Minas and Delfinópolis (SE), Ibiraci (S), Pedregulho and Rifaina (SW), Conquista and Uberaba, and Nova Ponte and Santa Juliana (NW).

=== Communications and distances ===
Sacramento is connected to Uberaba by state highway MG-190 and national highway BR-262. The distance to Uberaba is 72 kilometers; Conquista is 22 km to the southwest; Araxá is 82 km to the northeast. The nearest railroad is in Uberaba.

Other distances

- Uberlândia: 180
- Ribeirão Preto: 190
- Franca: 100
- Belo Horizonte: 453
- Rio de Janeiro: 885
- São Paulo: 585
- Brasília: 604
- Vitória: 995

== Economic activities ==
The GDP in 2005 was approximately R$681 million, with 97 million reais from taxes, 132 million reais from services, 325 million reais from industry, and 125 million reais from agriculture. In 2005 there were 128 industrial units employing 1,325 workers. There were 976 rural producers on 155,000 hectares of land. The high elevation means the land is suitable for coffee growing. 355 farms had tractors (2006). Approximately 3,000 persons were dependent on agriculture. The main crops are coffee, potatoes, rice, soybeans, wheat, beans, and corn. There were 22,000 head of cattle (2006), most of which were raised for milk and cheese production.

There were 4 banks (2007) and 4,764 automobiles (2007), giving a ratio of 5 inhabitants per automobile.

== Health and education ==
In the health sector there were 12 public health clinics (2005) and 1 private hospital with 68 beds. Patients with more serious health conditions are transported to Araxá or to Uberaba, which are connected by good roads. Educational needs were met by 14 primary schools, 4 middle schools, and 4 pre-primary schools.

- Municipal Human Development Index: 0.797 (2000)
- State ranking: 49 out of 853 municipalities as of 2000
- National ranking: 629 out of 5,138 municipalities as of 2000
- Literacy rate: 90%
- Life expectancy: 73 (average of males and females)

In 2000 the per capita monthly income of R$272.00 was just below the state and national average of R$276.00 and R$297.00 respectively.

The highest ranking municipality in Minas Gerais in 2000 was Poços de Caldas with 0.841, while the lowest was Setubinha with 0.568. Nationally the highest was São Caetano do Sul in São Paulo with 0.919, while the lowest was Setubinha. In more recent statistics (considering 5,507 municipalities) Manari in the state of Pernambuco has the lowest rating in the country—0,467—putting it in last place.

== See also ==
- List of municipalities in Minas Gerais
