= Abadia dos Dourados =

Coordinates: 18°29′11″S 47°24′12″W

- Municipality
- Município de Abadia dos Dourados; Municipality of Abadia dos Dourados
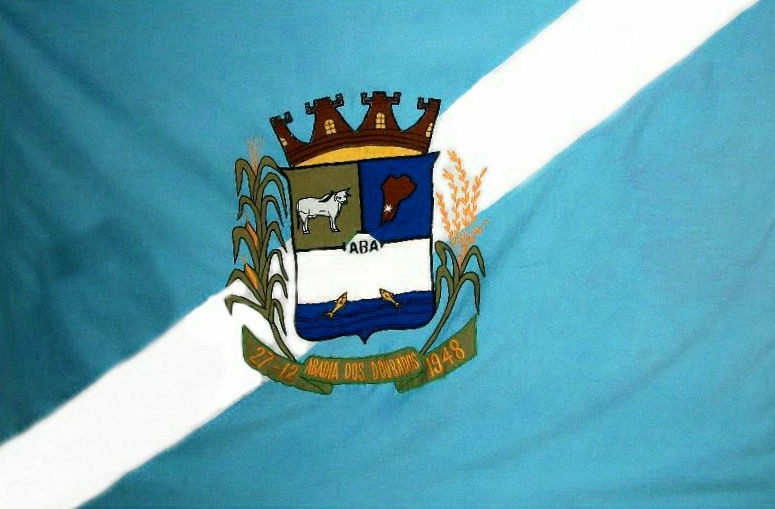
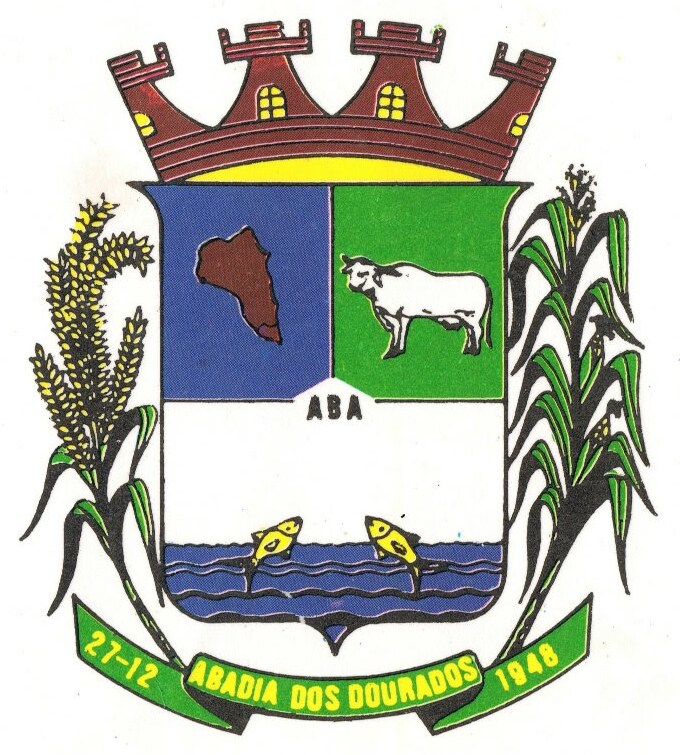
- Flag Coat of arms

- Location in Minas Gerais

- Localization in Brazil Abadia dos Dourados (Brazil)
- Country: Brazil
- Region: Southeast
- State: Minas Gerais
- Founded: December 27, 1948

Government
  - Mayor: Wanderlei Lemes dos Santos (DEM)

Area
  - Total: 881.064 km^{2} (340.181 sq mi)

Population (2020)
  - Total: 7,006
  - Density: 7.61/km^{2} (19.7/sq mi)
- Demonym: abadiense
- Time zone: UTC−3 (BRT)
- Postal code: 38540-000 to 38549-999
- Area code: (+55) 34
- Website: www.abadiadosdourados.mg.gov.br

Abadia dos Dourados is a Brazilian municipality located in the northwest of the state of Minas Gerais. Its population as of 2020 was 7,006 people living in a total area of 894 km^{2}. The city belongs to the mesoregion of Triângulo Mineiro e Alto Paranaiba and to the microregion of Patrocínio. It became a municipality in 1948.

== Geography ==
The municipality is located in the region of the Alto Paranaíba, south of the Paranaíba River and west of the Emborcação Reservoir. It is in the valley of the upper reaches of the Dourados River. Neighboring municipalities are: Catalão (N), Monte Carmelo (S), Coromandel (E), and Douradoquara (W).

=== Distances ===
- Coromandel: 23 km
- Monte Carmelo: 33 km
- Patrocínio: 71 km
- Uberlândia: 135 km
- Belo Horizonte: 547 km

== History ==
The first European settlers came in search of diamonds during the nineteenth century. The first church was built in 1886. The first name was Arraiai do Garimpo (Village of the Mining Claim). The name of the church, Nossa Senhora da Abadia, and the proximity to the Dourados River, gave rise to the new name, Abadia dos Dourados. In 1882 it became a district of Patrocínio. In 1923 it was incorporated in the municipality of Coromandel, separating in 1948.

== Economic activities ==
The most important economic activities are cattle raising, commerce, and agriculture. The GDP in 2005 was R$ R$42 million, with 19 million generated by services, 04 million generated by industry, and 17 million generated by agriculture. Abadia dos Dourados is in the top tier of municipalities in the state with regard to economic and social development. As of 2007 there was one banking agency in the town. There was a modest retail infrastructure serving the surrounding area of cattle and agricultural lands. There were 995 automobiles in all of the municipality (2007), about one for every 07 inhabitants.

Abadia dos Dourados has a small municipal area and therefore little available land for agriculture. In the rural area there were 910 establishments (2006) occupying 71,000 hectares (planted area—6,800 ha, and natural pasture—52,000 ha.). About 2,800 persons were dependent on agriculture. 100 of the farms had tractors, a ratio of one in 09 farms. There were 50,000 head of cattle in 2006. The main crops were coffee, corn, rice, and soybeans.

== Health and education ==
In the health sector there were 02 health clinics and 01 hospital with 22 beds. In the educational sector there were 02 pre-primary schools, 06 primary schools, and 01 middle school.

- Municipal Human Development Index: 0.759 (2000)
- State ranking: 213 out of 853 municipalities as of 2000
- National ranking: 1,602 out of 5,138 municipalities as of 2000
- Literacy rate: 87%
- Life expectancy: 73 (average of males and females)

The highest ranking municipality in Minas Gerais in 2000 was Poços de Caldas with 0.841, while the lowest was Setubinha with 0.568. Nationally the highest was São Caetano do Sul in São Paulo with 0.919, while the lowest was Setubinha. In more recent statistics (considering 5,507 municipalities) Manari in the state of Pernambuco has the lowest rating in the country—0,467—putting it in last place.

== See also ==
- List of municipalities in Minas Gerais
