= Santa Juliana =

Town and municipality in the state of Minas Gerais, Brazil

Coordinates: 19°51′54″S 47°26′24″W

- Municipality
- Interactive map of Santa Juliana
- Country: Brazil
- State: Minas Gerais
- Region: Southeast
- Time zone: UTC−3 (BRT)

Location of Santa Juliana

Santa Juliana is a Brazilian municipality located in the west of the state of Minas Gerais. Its population as of 2020 was 14,255 people living in a total area of 727 km^{2} (281 sq mi). The city belongs to the meso-region of Triângulo Mineiro and Alto Paranaíba and to the micro-region of Araxá. It became a municipality in 1938.

== History ==
The document that first mentions the region is a Sesmaria letter, dated November 18, 1795. It manifested the request of a Portuguese colonizer, requesting the possession of the lands to the Portuguese crown and citing its location, in the stops of Ribeirão Santa Juliana (Calmon Barreto Cultural Foundation, Araxá-MG).

In the midst of incomplete reports, the village emerged with the passage of the bandeirantes through the locality, where they found the Ribeirão and, in its vicinity, a humble family hovel, whose wife had the name of Juliana and the nickname of Santa (Saint). Thus, the pioneers gave that name to the brook. Due to the patron saint, Nossa Senhora das Dores( Our Lady of Sorrows ) and the Ribeirão, the emergent village was named Dores de Santa Juliana (St. Juliana Sorrows). Around 1842, the construction of the Chapel of Nossa Senhora das Dores took place, and due to the excellence of the land, which admirably lends itself to agriculture, the locality developed rapidly.

The District of Dores de Santa Juliana was created by Provincial Law number 2153 of November 15, 1875, and maintained by State Law number 2 of September 14, 1891.

The administrative division of 1911, the tables for calculating the general census of 1920 and the administrative division of 1923, were presented under the jurisdiction of the municipality of Araxá, which is also verified in the administrative division of 1933. denomination of Santa Juliana.

On December 17, 1938, by State Decree Law number 148, the district was elevated to the category of city, with the creation of the municipality of Santa Juliana, consisting of a single district, that of the headquarters. The town received the title of city on December 17, 1938.

== Geography ==
The city center of Santa Juliana is located at an elevation of 907 meters, in the Rio Araguari valley. Neighboring municipalities are: Nova Ponte (W), Pedrinópolis (N), Perdizes (E), and Sacramento (S).

=== Communications and distances ===
Santa Juliana is connected to Uberaba by state highway MG-190 and national highway BR-452. The nearest railroad station is in Uberaba.

Other distances (in km.)

- Uberaba: 83
- Perdizes: 36
- Araxá: 75
- Belo Horizonte: 453
- Uberlândia: 92
- São Paulo: 500
- Brasília: 500

== Economic activities ==
The GDP in 2005 was approximately R$150 million, with 10 million reais from taxes, 51 million reais from services, 27 million reais from industry, and 61 million reais from agriculture. There were 337 rural producers on 34,000 hectares of land. 98 farms had tractors (2006). Approximately 1,800 persons were dependent on agriculture. The main crops are coffee, potatoes, rice, onions, soybeans, beans, and corn. There were 23,000 head of cattle (2006), most of which were raised for milk and cheese production. There was also a large production of poultry.

There was 1 bank (2007) and 1,687 automobiles (2007), giving a ratio of 6 inhabitants per automobile.

== Health and education ==
In the health sector there were 3 public health clinics (2005) and 1 hospital with 37 beds. Patients with more serious health conditions are transported to Araxá or to Uberaba, which are connected by good roads. Educational needs were met by 4 primary schools, 1 middle school, and 4 pre-primary schools.

- Municipal Human Development Index: 0.786 (2000)
- State ranking: 89 out of 853 municipalities as of 2000
- National ranking: 898 out of 5,138 municipalities as of 2000
- Literacy rate: 89%
- Life expectancy: 73 (average of males and females)

In 2000 the per capita monthly income of R$275.00 was just below the state and national average of R$276.00 and R$297.00 respectively.

The highest ranking municipality in Minas Gerais in 2000 was Poços de Caldas with 0.841, while the lowest was Setubinha with 0.568. Nationally the highest was São Caetano do Sul in São Paulo with 0.919, while the lowest was Setubinha. In more recent statistics (considering 5,507 municipalities) Manari in the state of Pernambuco has the lowest rating in the country—0,467—putting it in last place.

== See also ==
- List of municipalities in Minas Gerais
