= Pedrinópolis =

Town and municipality in the state of Minas Gerais, Brazil

Coordinates: 19°13′40″S 47°27′43″W

- Municipality
- Interactive map of Pedrinópolis
- Country: Brazil
- State: Minas Gerais
- Region: Southeast
- Time zone: UTC−3 (BRT)

Location of Pedrinópolis

Pedrinópolis is a Brazilian municipality located in the west of the state of Minas Gerais. Its population as of 2020 was 3,643 people living in a total area of 357 km^{2} (138 sq mi). The city belongs to the meso-region of Triângulo Mineiro and Alto Paranaíba and to the micro-region of Araxá. It became a municipality in 1962.

== Geography ==
Pedrinópolis is located at an elevation of 930 meters, 95 km. southeast of Uberlândia on the southern shore of the Nova Ponte Represa. The distance to the state capital, Belo Horizonte, is 480 km. Neighboring municipalities are: Iraí de Minas (N), Perdizes (E), Santa Juliana S), and Nova Ponte (W).

== Communications ==
Pedrinópolis is connected to both Araxá and Uberlândia by national highway BR-462. The distance to Araxá is 75 kilometers.

== Economic activities ==
The GDP in 2005 was approximately R$49 million, with 20 million reais from services, 1 million reais from industry, and 25 million reais from agriculture. There were 161 rural producers on 14,000 hectares of land. The land is very fertile and agricultural production is high. 44 farms had tractors (2006). Approximately 600 persons were dependent on agriculture. The main crops are coffee, rice, soybeans, potatoes, and corn. There were 12,000 head of cattle (2006).

There was 1 bank (2007) and 483 automobiles (2007), giving a ratio of 6 inhabitants per automobile.

== Health and education ==
In the health sector there was 1 public health clinic and 1 hospital with 23 beds (2005). Patients with more serious health conditions are transported to Araxá or to Uberlândia, which are connected by good roads. Educational needs were met by 4 primary schools, 1 middle school, and 2 pre-primary schools.

- Municipal Human Development Index: 0.789 (2000)
- State ranking: 77 out of 853 municipalities as of 2000
- National ranking: 835 out of 5,138 municipalities as of 2000
- Literacy rate: 89%
- Life expectancy: 73 (average of males and females)

In 2000 the per capita monthly income of R$269.00 was just below the state and national average of R$276.00 and R$297.00 respectively.

The highest ranking municipality in Minas Gerais in 2000 was Poços de Caldas with 0.841, while the lowest was Setubinha with 0.568. Nationally the highest was São Caetano do Sul in São Paulo with 0.919, while the lowest was Setubinha. In more recent statistics (considering 5,507 municipalities) Manari in the state of Pernambuco has the lowest rating in the country—0,467—putting it in last place.

== See also ==
- List of municipalities in Minas Gerais
