= Serra do Salitre =

Town in Minas Gerais, Brazil

Coordinates: 19°06′39″S 46°41′24″W

- Municipality
- Interactive map of Serra do Salitre
- Country: Brazil
- State: Minas Gerais
- Region: Southeast
- Time zone: UTC−3 (BRT)

Location of Serra do Salitre in the state of Minas Gerais

Serra do Salitre is a Brazilian municipality located in the northwest of the state of Minas Gerais. Its population in 2020 was 11,668 living in a total area of 1,298 km^{2}. The city belongs to the mesoregion of Triângulo Mineiro e Alto Paranaiba and to the microregion of Patrocínio. It became a municipality in 1953.

== Geography ==
The municipality is located in the region of the Alto Paranaíba, just north of the Nova Ponte Reservoir, which is fed by the Rio Anzol and the Ribeirão Santa Juliana. The elevation of the town center is 1,200 meters. Highway connections are made by local road to BR-365, which connects to Uberlândia. Neighboring municipalities are: Cruzeiro da Fortaleza and Lagoa Formosa(N); Rio Paranaíba (E); Ibiá and Perdizes(S); Patrocínio (W).

=== Distances ===
- Monte Carmelo: 30 km
- Patrocínio: 42 km
- Uberlândia: 180 km
- Belo Horizonte: 368 km

== History ==
The area was first came to outside attention in 1675 when the bandeirante Castanho Taques discovered sulfurous waters here and baptized the region "Serra do Salitre", sulfur being a common ingredient to make gunpowder. The settlement was named Sao Sebastiao da Serra do Salitre. Later, the small town lost a large part of its population when many families moved to build the new capital of Brasília.

== Economic activities ==
The most important economic activities are cattle raising for meat and dairy, commerce and agriculture, with the main crops being coffee, corn, rice and citrus fruits. The GDP in 2005 was R$122 million, with 38 million generated by services, 4 million generated by industry, and 75 million generated by agriculture. Serra do Salitre is in the middle tier of municipalities in the state with regard to economic and social development. In 2007 there were two banking agencies in the town. There was a modest retail infrastructure serving the surrounding area of cattle and agricultural lands. There were 1,268 automobiles in the municipality, about one for every eight inhabitants.

Serra do Salitre has a large agricultural production especially in coffee, corn and soybeans. In the rural area there were 839 establishments in 2006 occupying 65,000 hectares (planted area: 27,000 ha). About 5,000 persons were dependent on agriculture. 270 of the farms had tractors, a ratio of one in two farms. There were 52,000 head of cattle in 2006. The main crops were coffee (9,700 hectares), corn (4,000 hectares), cotton (300 hectares), beans (2,400 hectares), potatoes (630 hectares) and soybeans (3,800 hectares).

== Health and education ==
In the health sector there were five health clinics and one hospital with 16 beds. In the educational sector there were two pre-primary schools, eight primary schools and one middle school. There is a campus of the Universidade Presidente Antônio Carlos (UNIPAC) with classes in education.

- Municipal Human Development Index: 0.745 (2000)
- State ranking: 321 out of 853 municipalities in 2000
- National ranking: 2,009 out of 5,138 municipalities in 2000
- Literacy rate: 86%
- Life expectancy: 71 (average of males and females)

The highest ranking municipality in Minas Gerais in 2000 was Poços de Caldas with 0.841, while the lowest was Setubinha with 0.568. Nationally the highest was São Caetano do Sul in São Paulo with 0.919, while the lowest was Setubinha. In more recent statistics (considering 5,507 municipalities) Manari in the state of Pernambuco has the lowest rating in the country — 0.467 — putting it in last place.

== See also ==
- List of municipalities in Minas Gerais
