= Cruzeiro da Fortaleza =

Town and municipality in the state of Minas Gerais, Brazil

Coordinates: 18°56′46″S 46°40′26″W

- Municipality
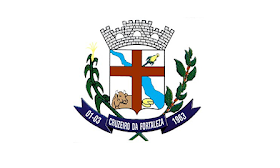
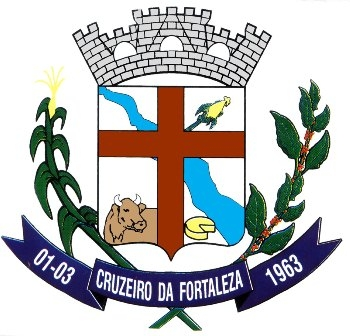
- Flag Coat of arms
- Interactive map of Cruzeiro da Fortaleza
- Country: Brazil
- State: Minas Gerais
- Region: Southeast
- Time zone: UTC−3 (BRT)

Location of Cruzeiro da Fortaleza

Cruzeiro da Fortaleza is a Brazilian municipality located in the northwest of the state of Minas Gerais. Its population as of 2020 was 3,639 people living in a total area of 185 km^{2}. The city belongs to the mesoregion of Triângulo Mineiro e Alto Paranaiba and to the microregion of Patrocínio. It became a municipality in 1963.

== Geography ==
The municipality is located in the region of the Alto Paranaíba, south of the Paranaíba River and west of the Emborcação Reservoir. Neighboring municipalities are: Guimarânia (N), Serra do Salitre (E) and (S), and Patrocínio (W).

The maximum elevation is 1,179 meters, at Cabeceira do Córrego da Limeira; the minimum elevation is 868 meters, at Foz do Córrego do Tonico. In the central point of the town the elevation is 840 meters. The average yearly temperature is 20.7 C; the average yearly maximum is 27.9 C; and the average yearly minimum is 14.8 C. The average yearly rainfall is 1,569.1 mm. Half of the land is flat and half is hilly. The main rivers are the Rio Fortaleza and the Córrego do Jacu.

=== Distances ===
- Guimarânia: 18 km
- Monte Carmelo: 20 km
- Patrocínio: 40 km
- Patos de Minas: 66 km
- Belo Horizonte: 413 km

== Economic activities ==
The most important economic activities are cattle raising, commerce, and agriculture. The GDP in 2005 was R$ R$27 million, with 12 million generated by services, 01 million generated by industry, and 12 million generated by agriculture. Cruzeiro da Fronteira is in the top tier of municipalities in the state with regard to economic and social development. As of 2007 there was one banking agency in the town. There was a modest retail infrastructure serving the surrounding area of cattle and agricultural lands. There were 378 automobiles in all of the municipality (2007), about one for every 10 inhabitants.

Cruzeiro da Fronteira has a small municipal area and therefore little available land for agriculture. In the rural area there were 189 establishments (2006) occupying 15,000 hectares (planted area—3,500 ha, and natural pasture—8,000 ha.). About 600 persons were dependent on agriculture. 48 of the farms had tractors, a ratio of one in 09 farms. There were 16,000 head of cattle in 2006. The main crops were coffee, corn, rice, and soybeans.

== Health and education ==
In 2006 there were 04 health clinics, 03 pre-school, 03 primary schools and one middle school.

- Municipal Human Development Index: 0.795 (2000)
- State ranking: 54 out of 853 municipalities as of 2000
- National ranking: 669 out of 5,138 municipalities as of 2000
- Literacy rate: 92%
- Life expectancy: 73 (average of males and females)

The highest ranking municipality in Minas Gerais in 2000 was Poços de Caldas with 0.841, while the lowest was Setubinha with 0.568. Nationally the highest was São Caetano do Sul in São Paulo with 0.919, while the lowest was Setubinha. In more recent statistics (considering 5,507 municipalities) Manari in the state of Pernambuco has the lowest rating in the country—0,467—putting it in last place.

== See also ==
- List of municipalities in Minas Gerais
