= Sacramento Airport =

Sacramento Airport may refer to:

Airports in Sacramento, California, United States:

- Sacramento International Airport (FAA: SMF)
- Sacramento Executive Airport (FAA: SAC)
- Sacramento Mather Airport (FAA: MHR)
- McClellan Airfield (FAA: MCC)

Airports in other places named Sacramento:

- Sacramento Airport (Brazil) in Sacramento, Minas Gerais, Brazil (ICAO: SNJW or SNSC)
