= Iraí de Minas =

Town and municipality in the state of Minas Gerais, Brazil

Coordinates: 18°59′02″S 47°27′39″W

- Municipality
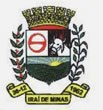
- Coat of arms
- Interactive map of Iraí de Minas
- Country: Brazil
- State: Minas Gerais
- Region: Southeast
- Time zone: UTC−3 (BRT)

Location of Iraí de Minas in the state of Minas Gerais

Iraí de Minas is a Brazilian municipality located in the northwest of the state of Minas Gerais. Its population as of 2020 was 7,027 people living in a total area of 357 km^{2} (138 sq mi). The city belongs to the mesoregion of Triângulo Mineiro e Alto Paranaiba and to the microregion of Patrocínio. It became a municipality in 1962.

== Geography ==
The municipality is located in the region of the Alto Paranaíba, just north of the Nova Ponte Reservoir, which is fed by the Rio Anzol and the Ribeirão Santa Juliana. The elevation of the town center is 951 meters. Highway connections are made by local road to BR-365, which connects to Uberlândia. Neighboring municipalities are: Monte Carmelo (N); Patrocínio (E); Pedrinópolis and Perdizes(S); Nova Ponte and Romaria (W).

=== Distances ===
- Monte Carmelo: 30 km
- Patrocínio: 62 km
- Uberlândia: 76 km
- Belo Horizonte: 495 km

== History ==
The first settlers were bandeirantes looking for precious stones. The discovery of the diamond Estrela o sul in 1852 caused the arrival of great numbers of prospectors to the region. A settlement was formed with the name Espírito Santo do Cemitério, later changed in 1909 to Iraí, a Tupi word meaning "river of honey". In 1943 the name was changed again to Bagagem, after the nearby river. In 1962 Iraí became a municipality with the present name.

== Economic activities ==
The most important economic activities are cattle raising for meat and dairy, commerce, and agriculture, with the main crops being coffee, corn, rice, and citrus fruits. The GDP in 2005 was R$65 million, with 346 million generated by services, 06 million generated by industry, and 19 million generated by agriculture. Iraí de Minas is in the middle tier of municipalities in the state with regard to economic and social development. As of 2007 there was one banking agency in the town. There was a modest retail infrastructure serving the surrounding area of cattle and agricultural lands. There were 895 automobiles in all of the municipality (2007), about one for every 07 inhabitants.

Iraí de Minas has a small municipal area and therefore little available land for agriculture. In the rural area there were 474 establishments (2006) occupying 39,000 hectares (planted area: 5,800 ha.; natural pasture: 29,000 ha.; and woodland: 3,800 ha.). About 1,500 persons were dependent on agriculture. 60 of the farms had tractors, a ratio of one in 08 farms. There were 19,500 head of cattle in 2006. The main crops were coffee, corn, rice, and soybeans .

== Health and education ==
In the health sector there were 03 health clinics and 01 hospital with 19 beds. In the educational sector there was 04 pre-primary schools, 04 primary school, and 01 middle school.

- Municipal Human Development Index: 0.757 (2000)
- State ranking: 236 out of 853 municipalities as of 2000
- National ranking: 1,672 out of 5,138 municipalities as of 2000
- Literacy rate: 87%
- Life expectancy: 71 (average of males and females)

The highest ranking municipality in Minas Gerais in 2000 was Poços de Caldas with 0.841, while the lowest was Setubinha with 0.568. Nationally the highest was São Caetano do Sul in São Paulo with 0.919, while the lowest was Setubinha. In more recent statistics (considering 5,507 municipalities) Manari in the state of Pernambuco has the lowest rating in the country—0,467—putting it in last place.

== See also ==
- List of municipalities in Minas Gerais
