= Patrocínio =

- Municipality
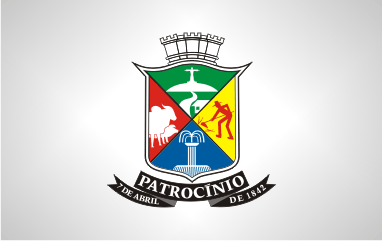
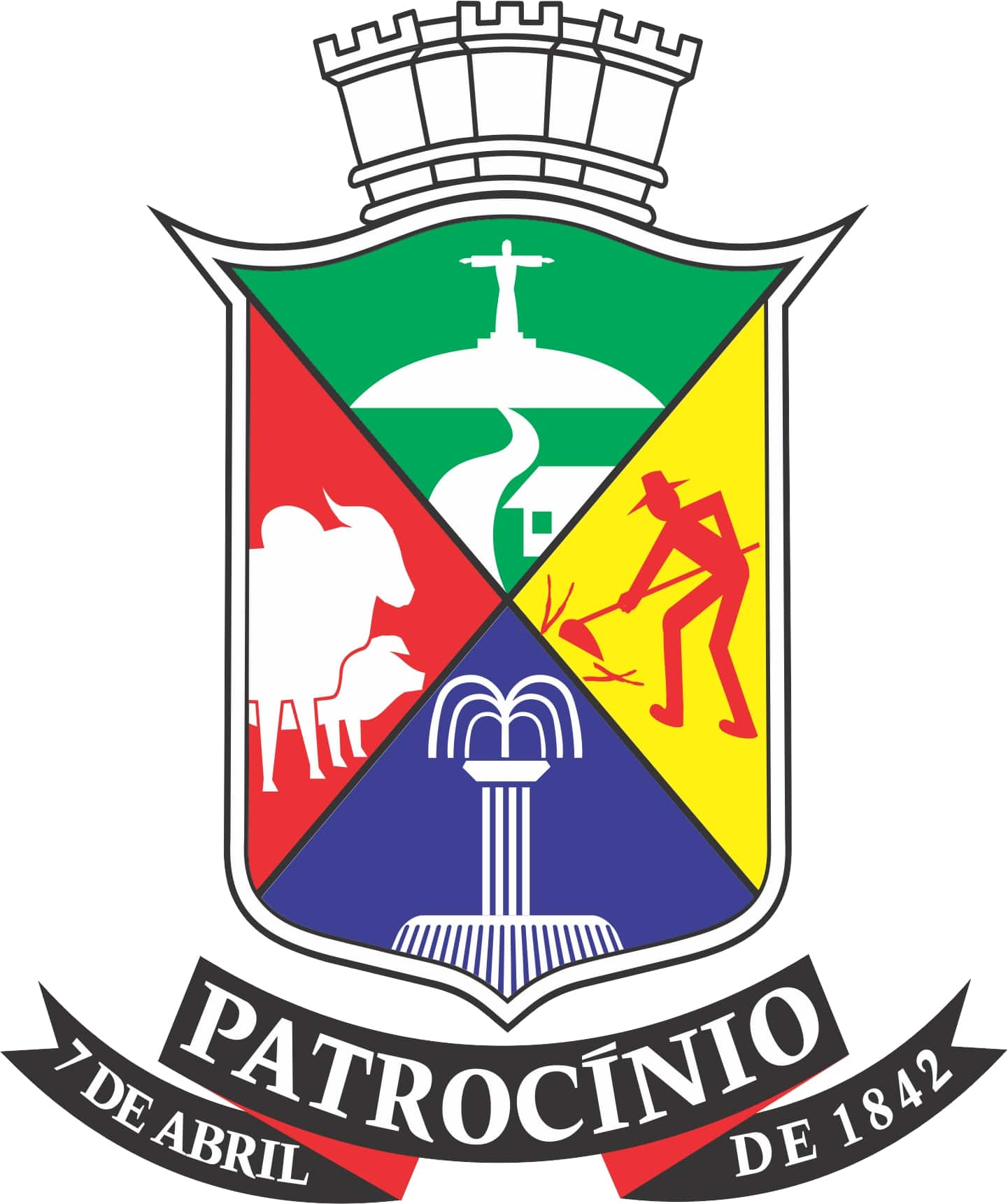
- Flag Coat of arms

- Location in Minas Gerais state

- Location in Brazil
- Coordinates: 18°56′S 46°59′W
- Country: Brazil
- Region: Southeast
- State: Minas Gerais
- Microregion: Patrocínio

Government
  - Mayor: Deiró Moreira Marra (Democrats (Brazil))

Area
  - Total: 2,874 km^{2} (1,110 sq mi)

Population (2020)
  - Total: 91,449
  - Density: 31.82/km^{2} (82.41/sq mi)
- Time zone: UTC−3 (BRT)

Patrocínio is a municipality in the state of Minas Gerais in Brazil. The population is 91,449 (2020 est.) in an area of 2874 km^{2}. The elevation is 965 m.

== Geography ==
It is located in the north-center of the state near the rich industrial and agricultural region of the Triângulo Mineiro, on BR 365 between Patos de Minas and Uberlândia. It is home to the Edward Lane Bible Institute.

Patrocínio is surrounded by the following municipalities: Coromandel to the north, Guimarânia, Cruzeiro da Fortaleza and Serra do Salitre to the east, Perdizes to the south and Iraí de Minas and Monte Carmelo to the west.

=== Highway connections ===
Patrocínio is connected with Uberlândia by BR-365 (154 km) and with Patos de Minas, 72 kilometers to its northeast. Other distances are:

- Belo Horizonte: 405 km
- Araguari: 160 km
- Perdizes: 62 km
- Uberaba: 191 km

BR-365, a federal road, crosses through Patrocínio. It has an extension of 866 km. linking Montes Claros, a northern city in the state of Minas Gerais to the state of Goiás, passing through the city of Uberlândia, the largest and most important city in the western part of the state. Another important highway is BR-462, which connects Perdizes with Patrocínio and has a length of 76 km.

=== Statistical micro-region ===
Patrocínio is also a statistical micro-region with six municipalities: Abadia dos Dourados, Coromandel, Cruzeiro da Fortaleza, Douradoquara, Estrela do Sul, Grupiara, Iraí de Minas, Monte Carmelo, Patrocínio, Romaria, and Serra do Salitre. In the year 2000, its population was 182,850 inhabitants in a total area of 12,017.00 km^{2}. The population density (year 2000) was 5.22 inhabitants/km^{2}.

=== Hydrography ===
The river network of the municipality is extensive and belongs to the basin of the Paranaíba River. The main watercourses are the rivers: Quebranzol and Santo Antonio (tributaries of the Rio Araguari); Dourados and Perdizes and Rio Espírito Santo as well as the streams (ribeirões) Salitre, Pavões, Macaúbas and Córrego do Ouro. There are also waterfalls that are little known by tourists. One example is “Cachoeiras do Lemos”, on the Ribeirão de Rita Matos, which flows into the Rio Salitre and "Cachoeira dos Borges". Patrocínio has many small streams that allow for irrigation of the fields and for the raising of fish. The municipality has the greatest area of the region inundated by the Hydroelectric Reservoir of Nova Ponte, a total of 135.44 square kilometers. In 2006 the reservoir reached its maximum level, 815 meters above sea level.

The vegetation is cerrado, a landscape characterized by extensive savanna formations crossed by gallery forests and stream valleys. Traditionally this region was used for cattle raising, but in recent years the growing of soybeans has made encroachments causing the loss of most of the trees. Rainfall is abundant, between 1,100 and 1,600 millimeters per year, although this rainfall is concentrated in a six- to seven-month period between October and April.

=== Climate ===
The climate can be classified as Tropical of altitude, with yearly average temperature between 9 °C (48.2 °F) and 35 °C (95 °F). The Köppen climate classification of the region is Cwa (Tropical on high altitudes, humid/warm summer and a dry/cool winter). As a city located in the Southern Hemisphere, the spring starts in September, summer in December, autumn in March, and winter in June. There are just two seasons (a hot and humid one from October to March, and a colder and drier one from April to September). The coldest month is generally July and the hottest month is January. The climate is mild throughout the year with the high altitude reducing the heat and humidity so common at lower elevations.

=== Districts and villages ===
Patrocínio has four districts: Salitre de Minas, São João da Serra Negra, Silvano e Santa Luzia dos Barros. The main villages are São Benedito, Tejuco, Chapadão de Ferro, Dourados, Boa Vista, Santo Antônio do Quebra Anzol, Pedros and Macaúbas.

== Economy ==
The region has an economy based on cattle raising and agriculture, with dairy cattle being the most important activity. It is also the third largest producer of hogs in the country. There are also many small industries and the commercial sector is very strong.

Patrocínio has a bovine herd raised mainly for milk. According to the IBGE, there are approximately 132,000 head, distributed among 2,166 producers, responsible for the production of approximately 130,000 liters a day, which is mainly sent to the Belo Horizonte market. Part of the milk is transformed into traditional cheese and candies.

In hog production there are 14 large producers, with thousands of sows. These large ranches, together with dozens of small producers, raise approximately 5,399 sows, with an average production of 22 piglets a year, with a total of more than 125,000 head. The production is commercialized in Uberlândia and Belo Horizonte.

One of the strongest economic sectors is its industry. There are industries of ceramics, cold meats, animal feed, textiles – Minas Silk, and various warehouses to process coffee.

=== Coffee production ===
Patrocínio has become one of the most important coffee producing areas of Brazil. About 78% of the economy is connected to coffee, with the activity employing more than 30,000 people.

The cultivation of coffee began in the 1970s when strong frost decimated the large farms of Paraná and São Paulo. The region has a mild climate, good water distribution, with a large number of streams, and an annual rainfall considered ideal for coffee—about 1,600 milliliters.

=== Main agricultural crops in planted area (2006) ===
==== Area of permanent crops ====
- Coffee: 32,400 ha
- Passion fruit: 105 ha
- Banana: 90 ha
- Tangerine: 70 ha
- Coconut: 20 ha

==== Area of perennial crops ====
- Corn: 13,000 ha
- Soybeans: 10,000 ha
- Beans: 1,550 ha
- Sorghum: 760 ha
- Potatoes: 350 ha
- Tomatoes: 276 ha
- Manioc: 150 ha
- Rice: 100 ha
- Sugarcane: 100 ha

==== Farm information (year 2006) ====
- Number of farms: 2,725
- Total agricultural area: 186,481 ha
- Area of permanent crops: 28,489 ha
- Area of perennial crops: 47,786 ha
- Area of natural pasture: 85,506 ha
- Workers related to the producer: 5,593
- Workers not related to the producer: 12,412

== Education ==
The municicipal network has 12 schools with 7,180 students enrolled.

- Child education: 2,043 students
- Primary education: 4,435 students
- Middle school: 80 students
- Night school. 500 students In child education there are 2,043 students

The municipality has 21 schools in the state network. There are also four private schools, Colégio Nossa Senhora do Patrocínio, Prisma, Atenas, ABC and several child care centers. There are two institutes of higher learning—Centro Universitário do Cerrado and the Faculdade de Filosofia, Ciências e Letras de Patrocínio.

== Municipal Human Development Index ==
The MHDI was 0.799 in 2000.

== Tourism ==
Chapadão lake can be reached by BR-365 or by the Patrocínio/Cruzeiro da Fortaleza road. It is believed that Chapadão is the impact crater, which is clearly seen through Google Earth to the right of the city, being a small part of it a lake, and the large remainder farm land.

The city offers attractive plazas, where its inhabitants enjoy evening strolls. The main ones are Monsenhor Tiago, or Matriz, Santa Luzia and Honorato Borges. Its hotel infrastructure offers more than 1,000 beds in a total of 14 hotels.

== Culture ==
The Casa da Cultura de Patrocínio promotes and stimulates the cultural activities in the city. It offers courses in painting, jewelry making, and rug making. It is a place where local artists can show their works. The holdings consist of 243 paintings by national and local artists. There is a collection of 843 photos of historical Patrocinio.

Museu Professor Hugo Machado da Silveira: this museum holds the municipal archives, documents, specimens of natural history, rare photos, clothes, machinery, and tools, used throughout the history of the town.

There is a rich tradition of folkloric dances called Congadas. These dance groups show a strong African-Brazilian influence. The festivities are in honor of Nossa Senhora do Rosário and São Benedito and Santa Luzia. Most of the celebrations are held between the months of August and January. This is one of the richest traditions brought by the slaves from the Congo-Angola region who lived in the region in the seventeenth and eighteenth centuries.

== Sports infrastructure ==
There is a stadium for professional football—Estádio Júlio Aguiar—and a sports center seating several thousand spectators for basketball, volleyball and shows. This sports-center belongs to the Ginásio do Patrocínio Tênis Clube. In the city there are 7 multipurpose gymnasiums in addition to several swimming pools.

== History ==
The origins of the region begin with the bandeirantes, explorers during the Portuguese colonial period, who passed through on their way to the capitania of Goiás looking for gold and slaves. In 1771 the Conde de Valadares, Captain General of Minas Gerais, asked Inácio de Oliveira Campos to make explorations and excavations in the region. In 1773 in the valley of the Rio Dourados he started a ranch called Bromado dos Pavões. This small settlement became part of the Capitania of Goiás and the name was later changed to Salitre. In 1793 the first inhabitants appeared and in 1800 the first chapel was built. At this time the settlement was only an "arraial", a village, and was called Senhora do Patrocínio. In 1819 it had about 40 houses made of mud (adobe bricks) and wood covered with tiles and without any plasterings. On March 9, 1839 the parish was established and the first parish priest was appointed. On April 7, 1842 Nossa Senhor do Patrocínio was declared a municipality separating thus from Araxá. In 1858 part of the municipality was dismembered to create Estrela do Sul. In 1868 another dismemberment occurred creating Patos de Minas.

The name of the city is supposedly due to a very rich landowner, who, according to the legend, upon seeing his only daughter gravely ill, asked protection from the Virgin Mary, promising the construction of a chapel if the girl was cured. When this took place he had a church built, bestowing upon it the name of Nossa Senhora do Patrocínio, which means "protection".

== See also ==
- List of municipalities in Minas Gerais
