= Guimarânia =

Town and municipality in the state of Minas Gerais, Brazil

Coordinates: 18°50′38″S 46°47′34″W

- Municipality
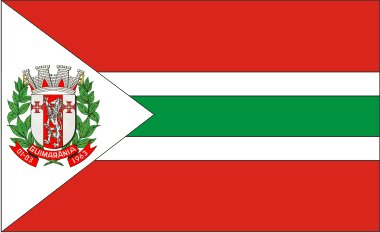
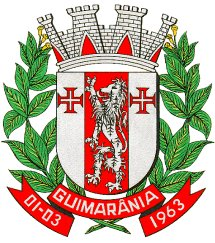
- Flag Coat of arms
- Interactive map of Guimarânia
- Country: Brazil
- State: Minas Gerais
- Region: Southeast
- Time zone: UTC−3 (BRT)

Location of Guimarânia in Minas Gerais

Guimarânia is a Brazilian municipality located in the northwest of the state of Minas Gerais. Its population as of 2020 was 8,105 people living in a total area of 371 km^{2} (143 sq mi). The city belongs to the mesoregion of Triângulo Mineiro e Alto Paranaiba and to the microregion of Patos de Minas. It became a municipality in 1963.

== Geography ==
The urban center is located at an elevation of 958 meters between Patos de Minas and Patrocínio on federal highway BR-265. Neighboring municipalities are: Coromandel and Patos de Minas (N), Patos de Minas (E), Cruzeiro da Fortaleza (S), and Patrocínio (W).

=== Distances ===
- Patrocínio: 22 km
- Patos de Minas: 43 km
- Uberlândia: 170 km
- Belo Horizonte: 461 km

Connections to the north and south are made by federal highway BR-354, which lies 4 km from the city center.

== Economic activities ==
The most important economic activities are cattle raising, commerce, and agriculture, especially the growing of coffee. The GDP in 2005 was R$ R$45 million, of which 21 million came from services, 03 million came from industry, and 19 million came from agriculture. Guimarânia is in the top tier of municipalities in the state with regard to economic and social development. As of 2007 there was 91 banking agency in the town. There was a modest retail infrastructure serving the surrounding area of cattle and agricultural lands. There were 977 automobiles in all of the municipality (2007), about one for every 07 inhabitants.

In the rural area there were 492 establishments occupying 20,000 hectares (planted area, 5,700 ha and natural pasture 11,500 ha.) (2006). About 1,500 persons were employed in agriculture. 93 of the farms had tractors, a ratio of one in 05 farms. There were 21,000 head of cattle in 2006. The main crops were coffee, soybeans, and corn.

== Health and education ==
In the health sector there were 02 health clinics and no hospitals. In the educational sector there were 02 pre-primary schools, 04 primary schools, and 01 middle school.

- Municipal Human Development Index: 0.775 (2000)
- State ranking: 137 out of 853 municipalities as of 2000
- National ranking: 1,176 out of 5,138 municipalities as of 2000
- Literacy rate: 90%
- Life expectancy: 74 (average of males and females)
- Infant mortality (1998): 19.49

The highest ranking municipality in Minas Gerais in 2000 was Poços de Caldas with 0.841, while the lowest was Setubinha with 0.568. Nationally the highest was São Caetano do Sul in São Paulo with 0.919, while the lowest was Setubinha. In more recent statistics (considering 5,507 municipalities) Manari in the state of Pernambuco has the lowest rating in the country—0,467—putting it in last place.

== See also ==
- List of municipalities in Minas Gerais
