= Nova Ponte =

Town and municipality in the state of Minas Gerais, Brazil

Coordinates: 19°11′54″S 47°43′48″W

- Municipality
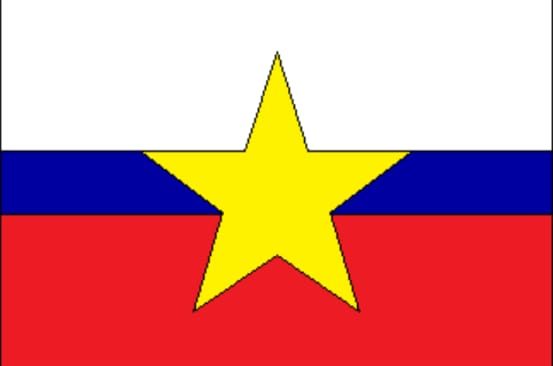
- Flag Coat of arms
- Interactive map of Nova Ponte
- Country: Brazil
- State: Minas Gerais
- Region: Southeast
- Time zone: UTC−3 (BRT)

Location of Nova Ponte

Nova Ponte is a Brazilian municipality located in the west of the state of Minas Gerais. Its population as of 2020 was estimated to be 15,800 people living in a total area of 1,105 km^{2} (427 sq mi). The city belongs to the mesoregion of Triângulo Mineiro and Alto Paranaíba and to the micro-region of Araxá. It became a municipality in 1938.

== Geography ==
Nova Ponte is located at an elevation of 791 meters, 70 km. east of Uberlândia on the western end of the Nova Ponte Represa. The distance to the state capital, Belo Horizonte, is 479 km. Neighboring municipalities are: Romaria and Iraí de Minas (N), Pedrinópolis, Santa Juliana, and Sacramento (E), Uberaba (S and W), Indianópolis (NW).

=== Weather facts ===
- Average annual maximum temperature: 29.1°C
- Average annual minimum temperature: 16.6°C
- Average annual rainfall: 1,589 mm

== Communications ==
Nova Ponte is connected to one of the most important export corridors in Brazil by way of the Ferrovia Central Atlântica.

== Economic activities ==
The GDP in 2005 was approximately R$441 million, with 70 million reais from services, 218 million reais from industry, and 85 million reais from agriculture. Nova Ponte receives royalties from the hydroelectric plant—Usina Hidrelétrica de Nova Ponte. There were 358 rural producers on 69,000 hectares of land. The land is very fertile and agricultural production is high. 131 farms had tractors (2006). Approximately 1,600 persons were dependent on agriculture. The main crops are coffee, sugarcane, soybeans, potatoes, and corn. There were 32,000 head of cattle (2006) and almost one million chickens.

There were 2 banks (2007) and 1,445 automobiles (2007), giving a ratio of 8 inhabitants per automobile.

== Health and education ==
In the health sector there were 3 public health clinics and 1 hospital with 16 beds (2005). Patients with more serious health conditions are transported to Uberaba or to Uberlândia, which are connected by good roads. Educational needs were met by 7 primary schools, 1 middle school, and 4 pre-primary schools.

- Municipal Human Development Index: 0.803 (2000)
- State ranking: 33 out of 853 municipalities as of 2000
- National ranking: 497 out of 5,138 municipalities as of 2000
- Literacy rate: 88%
- Life expectancy: 74 (average of males and females)

In 2000 the per capita monthly income of R$305.00 was above the state and national average of R$276.00 and R$297.00 respectively.

The highest ranking municipality in Minas Gerais in 2000 was Poços de Caldas with 0.841, while the lowest was Setubinha with 0.568. Nationally the highest was São Caetano do Sul in São Paulo with 0.919, while the lowest was Setubinha. In more recent statistics (considering 5,507 municipalities) Manari in the state of Pernambuco has the lowest rating in the country—0,467—putting it in last place.

== See also ==
- List of municipalities in Minas Gerais
