= Mário Palmério =

Brazilian politician and writer

Mário de Ascenção Palmério (1 March 1916 – 24 September 1996) was a Brazilian politician and writer, who was born in Monte Carmelo, Minas Gerais. He died at Uberaba, Minas Gerais, in 1996.

== Bibliography ==
- Vila dos confins, novel (1956);
- Chapadão do bugre, novel (1965)
- O morro das sete voltas, novel
- Seleta... (1974)
