= Perdizes, Minas Gerais =

Town and municipality in the state of Minas Gerais, Brazil

Coordinates: 19°21′10″S 47°17′34″W

- Municipality
- Coat of arms
- Interactive map of Perdizes, Minas Gerais
- Country: Brazil
- State: Minas Gerais
- Region: Southeast
- Time zone: UTC−3 (BRT)

Location of Perdizes

Perdizes is a Brazilian municipality located in the west of the state of Minas Gerais. Its population as of 2020 was 16,321 people living in a total area of 2,450 km^{2} (950 sq mi). The city belongs to the meso-region of Triângulo Mineiro and Alto Paranaíba and to the micro-region of Araxá. It became a municipality in 1938.

== Geography ==
Perdizes is located at an elevation of 830 meters, 95 km. southeast of Uberlândia and south of the Nova Ponte Reservoir. Neighboring municipalities are: Patrocínio (N), Serra do Salitre (NE), Ibiá (E), Araxá (SE), Uberaba (S), Santa Juliana and Pedrinópolis (W).

=== Communications and distances ===
Perdizes is connected to both Araxá and Uberlândia by national highway BR-462. The distance to Araxá is 46 kilometers; Pedrinópolis is 35 km; Uberaba is 95 km. The distance to the state capital, Belo Horizonte, is 480 km.

== Economic activities ==
The GDP in 2005 was approximately R$195 million, with 22 million reais from taxes, 84 million reais from services, 54 million reais from industry, and 33 million reais from agriculture. There were 628 rural producers on 18,000 hectares of land. The land is very fertile and agricultural production is high. 136 farms had tractors (2006). Approximately 2,400 persons were dependent on agriculture. The main crops are coffee, rice, soybeans, beans, and corn. There were 18,000 head of cattle (2006).

There were 4 bank (2007) and 3,525 automobiles (2007), giving a ratio of 4 inhabitants per automobile.

== Health and education ==
In the health sector there were 7 public health clinics and 1 hospital with 50 beds (2005). Patients with more serious health conditions are transported to Araxá or to Uberlândia, which are connected by good roads. Educational needs were met by 15 primary schools, 4 middle schools, and 7 pre-primary schools.

- Municipal Human Development Index: 0.776 (2000)
- State ranking: 129 out of 853 municipalities as of 2000
- National ranking: 1,149 out of 5,138 municipalities as of 2000
- Literacy rate: 87%
- Life expectancy: 73 (average of males and females)

In 2000 the per capita monthly income of R$273.00 was just below the state and national average of R$276.00 and R$297.00 respectively.

The highest ranking municipality in Minas Gerais in 2000 was Poços de Caldas with 0.841, while the lowest was Setubinha with 0.568. Nationally the highest was São Caetano do Sul in São Paulo with 0.919, while the lowest was Setubinha. In more recent statistics (considering 5,507 municipalities) Manari in the state of Pernambuco has the lowest rating in the country—0.467—putting it in last place.

== See also ==
- List of municipalities in Minas Gerais
