= Mineiro (disambiguation) =

Mineiro is a Brazilian Portuguese language accent.

Mineiro may also refer to:

- Demonym of Minas Gerais state, Brazil
- Campeonato Mineiro, a Brazilian football (soccer) competition
- Campeonato Mineiro Módulo II, a Brazilian football (soccer) competition
- Campeonato Mineiro Segunda Divisão, a Brazilian football (soccer) competition
- Clube Atlético Mineiro, a Brazilian association football club from Belo Horizonte, Minas Gerais
- Mineiros Esporte Clube, a Brazilian association football club from Mineiros, Goiás
- Mineiro (basketball player) (born 1988), a Brazilian basketball player (center)
- Mineiro (footballer, born 1969), Marcio dos Santos Silva, Brazilian football midfielder
- Mineiro (footballer, born 1975), Carlos Luciano da Silva, Brazilian football defensive midfielder
- Mineiro (footballer, born 1981), Huenes Marcelo Lemos, Brazilian football defender
- Cláudio Mineiro (born 1952), Cláudio Antônio do Nascimento, Brazilian football defender
