= Coromandel, Minas Gerais =

Municipality in Minas Gerais, Brazil

Coromandel
- Municipality
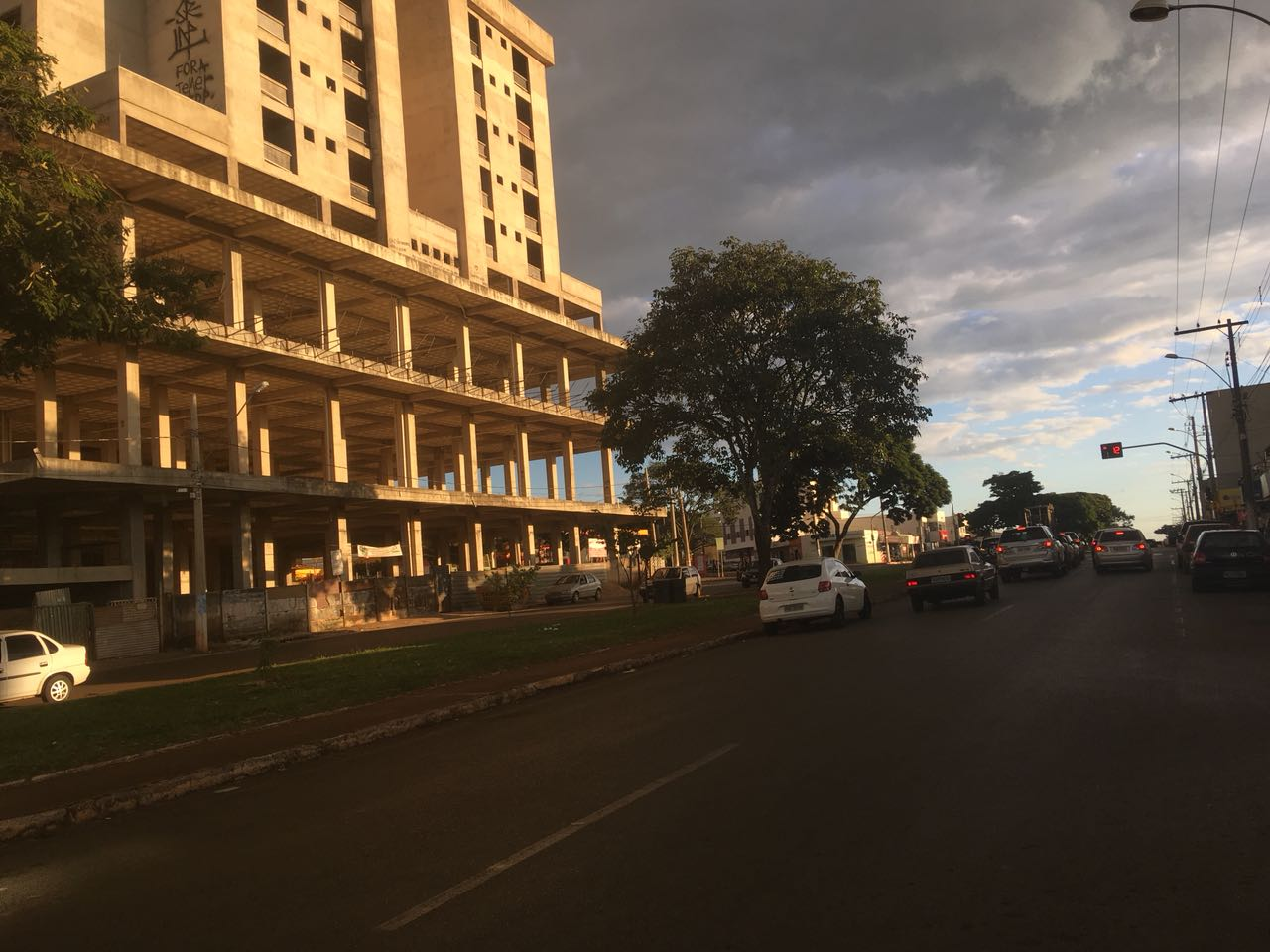
- Governador Israel Pinheiro Avenue at sunset

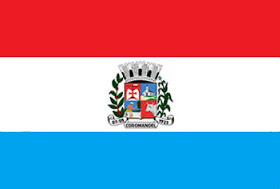
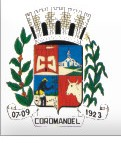
- Flag Coat of arms

- Location in Minas Gerais

- Location in Brazil
- Coordinates: 18°28′22″S 47°12′00″W
- Country: Brazil
- Region: Southeast
- State: Minas Gerais
- Intermediate region: Patos de Minas
- Immediate region: Patrocínio
- District created: 17 September 1870
- Municipality created: 6 October 1882
- Abolished: 13 November 1891
- Re-established: 7 September 1923
- Installed: 19 October 1924
- Districts: Coromandel, Alegre, Lagamar dos Coqueiros, Mateiro, Pântano de Santa Cruz, Santa Rosa dos Dourados

Government
  - Mayor: Nerso Hissao Chihara (2026–2028) (Republicans)

Area
  - Total: 3,313.313 km^{2} (1,279.277 sq mi)
- Elevation: 928 m (3,045 ft)

Population (2022)
  - Total: 28,894
  - Estimate (2025): 30,114
  - Density: 8.7206/km^{2} (22.586/sq mi)
- Demonym: coromandelense

Socioeconomic indicators
  - HDI (2010): 0.708
  - GDP per capita (2023): R$71,010.76
- Time zone: UTC−3 (BRT)
- Postal code: 38550-000
- Area code: 34
- Website: coromandel.mg.gov.br/novo/

Coromandel is a municipality in the Alto Paranaíba area of western Minas Gerais, Brazil. It belongs to the Immediate Geographic Region of Patrocínio and the Intermediate Geographic Region of Patos de Minas. The municipality covers 3,313.313 km^{2} (1,279.277 sq mi). Its population was 28,894 in the 2022 census and was estimated at 30,114 in 2025.

The settlement grew along routes between Paracatu and Goiás, where diamond mining and cattle raising drew settlers during the nineteenth century. Coromandel became a district in 1870 and a municipality in 1882. The municipality was abolished in 1891 and re-established in 1923. It consists of the districts of Coromandel, Alegre, Lagamar dos Coqueiros, Mateiro, Pântano de Santa Cruz, and Santa Rosa dos Dourados.

== History ==
Coromandel grew as a stopping place along routes between Paracatu and Goiás. Diamond mining and cattle raising brought settlers to the area during the nineteenth century.

Provincial Law No. 1,670 created the district of Coromandel on 17 September 1870. Provincial Law No. 2,930 separated it from Patrocínio and created a municipality on 6 October 1882. State Law No. 11 abolished the municipality on 13 November 1891 and returned its territory to Patrocínio.

State Law No. 843 re-established Coromandel on 7 September 1923 from the districts of Coromandel and Abadia dos Dourados. The municipality was installed on 19 October 1924. Abadia dos Dourados became a separate municipality in 1948. The same territorial reorganization created the district of Alegre. Santa Rosa dos Dourados became a district in 1953, Pântano de Santa Cruz in 2002, and Lagamar dos Coqueiros and Mateiro in 2004.

== Geography ==
Coromandel covers 3,313.313 km^{2} (1,279.277 sq mi) in western Minas Gerais. The municipal seat stands at an elevation of about 928 m (3,045 ft).

Elevations range from roughly 680 m (2,230 ft) in the Paranaíba valley in the northwest to 1,266 m (4,154 ft) near the southeastern boundary. The higher ground lies toward Patos de Minas, Guimarânia, and Patrocínio.

The climate is tropical, with most rain falling from October through April and a drier season from May through September. The native vegetation belongs to the Cerrado biome.

== Economy ==
Agricultural establishments covered 228,867 ha (565,540 acres) in the 2017 Agricultural Census. Cropland accounted for 36.43% of that land and pasture for 40.88%.

Mining includes alluvial diamonds and limestone. A diamond extraction operation received a simplified environmental license in 2025. Limestone is quarried and processed at an industrial plant in the municipality.

The municipality's GDP per capita was R$71,010.76 in 2023.

== See also ==
- List of municipalities in Minas Gerais
