= Emborcação Dam =

- Location within Brazil
- Official name: Usina de Emborcação
- Location: Araguari, MG, Brazil
- Coordinates: 18°26′49″S 47°59′11″W
- Construction began: 1977
- Opening date: 1983
- Construction cost: $380 million USD
- Owner: CEMIG

Dam and spillways
- Type of dam: Embankment
- Impounds: Paranaíba River
- Height: 158 m (518 ft)
- Length: 1,507 m (4,944 ft)
- Spillway type: Service, gate-controlled

Reservoir
- Creates: Emborcação Reservoir
- Total capacity: 17.6 km^{3} (14,300,000 acre⋅ft)
- Surface area: 703 km^{2} (271 sq mi)

Power Station
- Commission date: 1982-1983
- Type: Conventional
- Turbines: 4 x Francis turbines
- Installed capacity: 1,192 MW (1,598,000 hp)

The Emborcação Dam, also known as Theodomiro Santiago, is an embankment dam on the Paranaíba River near Araguari in Minas Gerais, Brazil. It was constructed for hydroelectric power production and flood control.

== Background ==
Feasibility studies for the dam occurred in 1971 and in June 1977, construction on the dam began. In August 1981, the dam began to impound the reservoir and the first generator became operation in 1982, the last in 1983. The dam was inaugurated in 1983 by Brazilian president João Batista Figueiredo.

== Dam ==
The dam is 1,507 metres (4,944 ft) long and 158 metres (518 ft) tall and withholds a reservoir with a capacity of 17.6 cubic kilometres (14,300,000 acre⋅ft) and surface area of 703 square kilometres (271 sq mi).

== Emborcação Hydroelectric Power Plant ==
The dam's power plant contains four 298 megawatts (400,000 hp) generators powered by Francis turbines for a total installed capacity of 1,192 megawatts (1,598,000 hp).

== See also ==
- List of power stations in Brazil
