= Monte Carmelo =

Municipality in Minas Gerais, Brazil

- Municipality
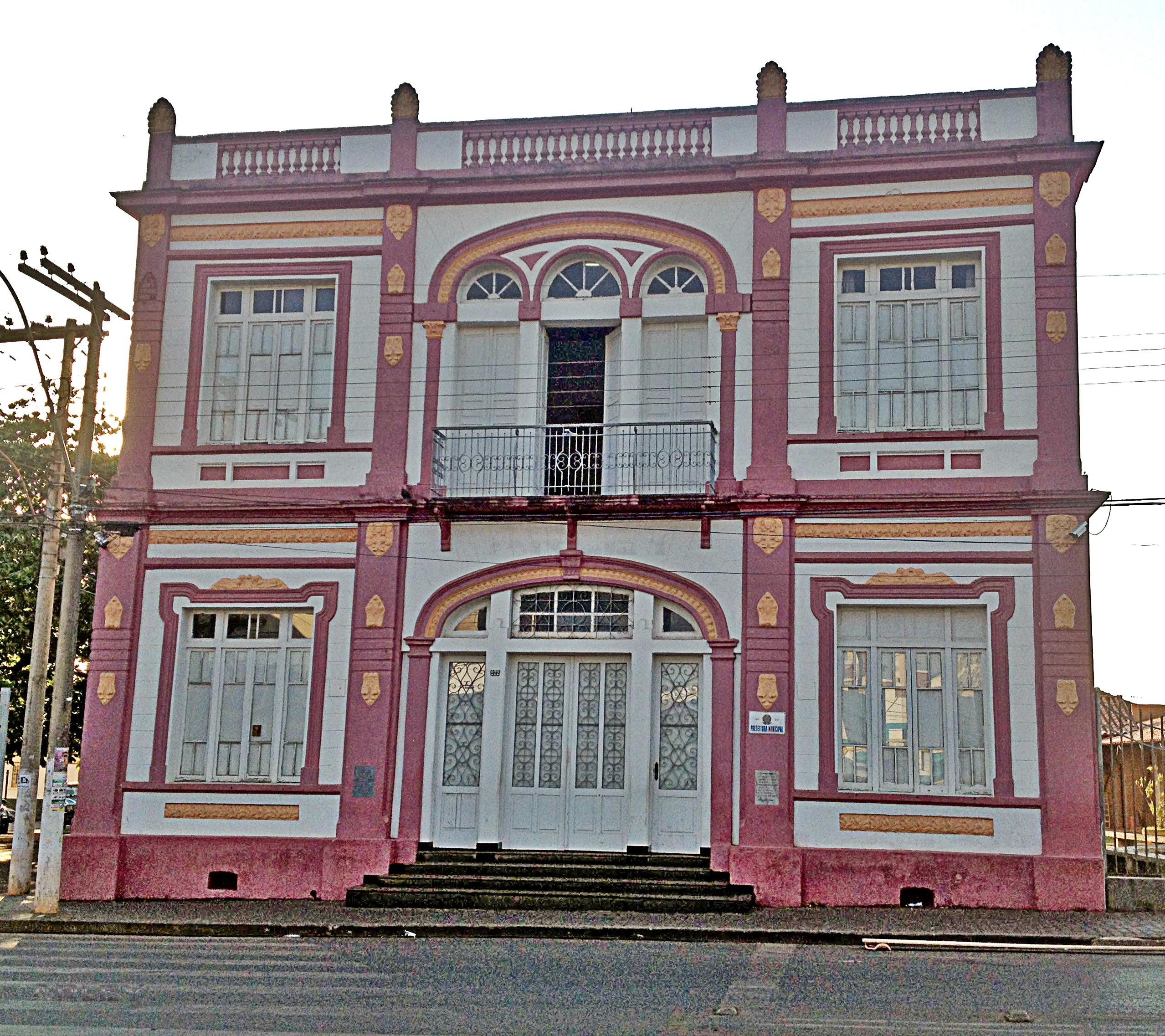
- Monte Carmelo City Hall

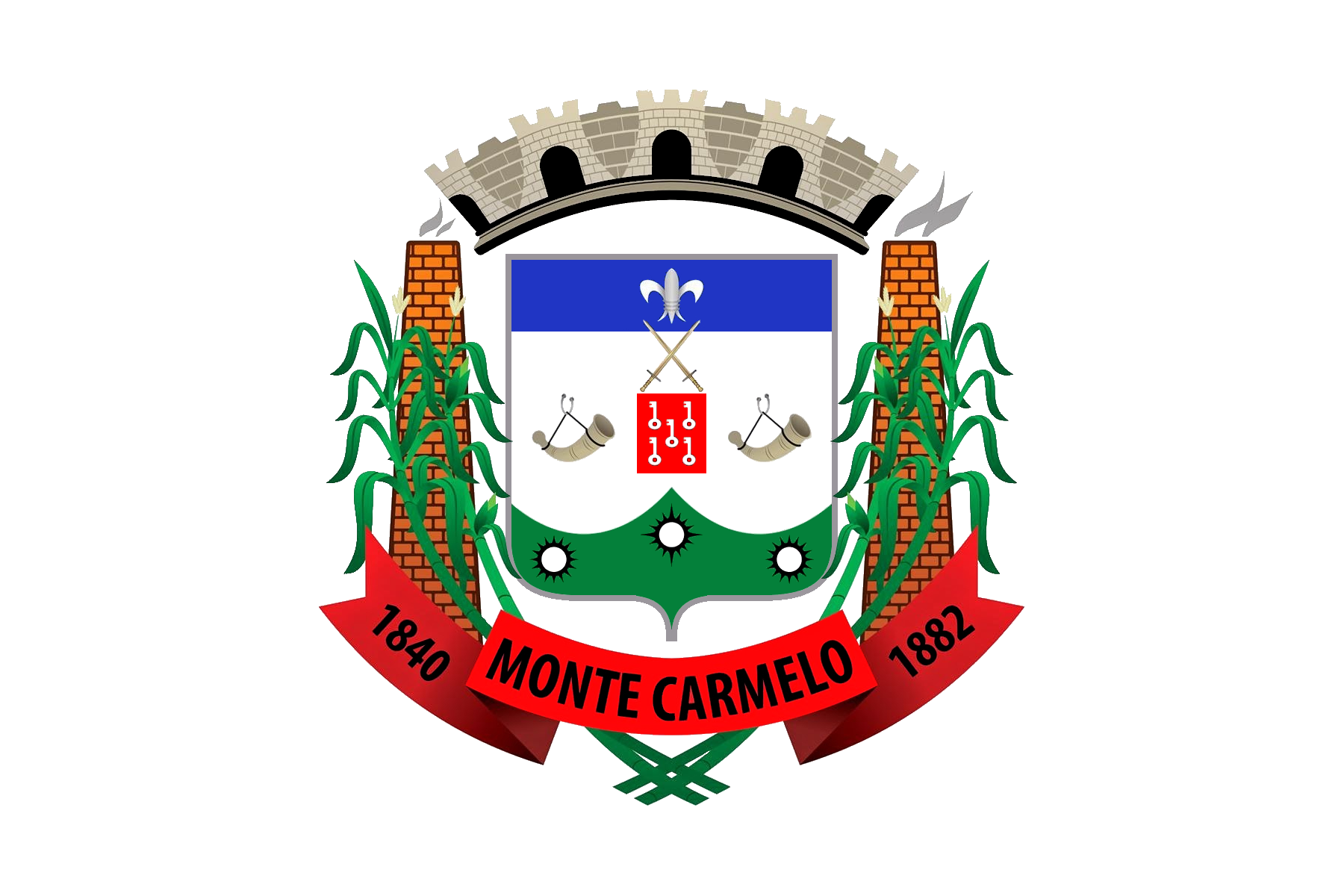
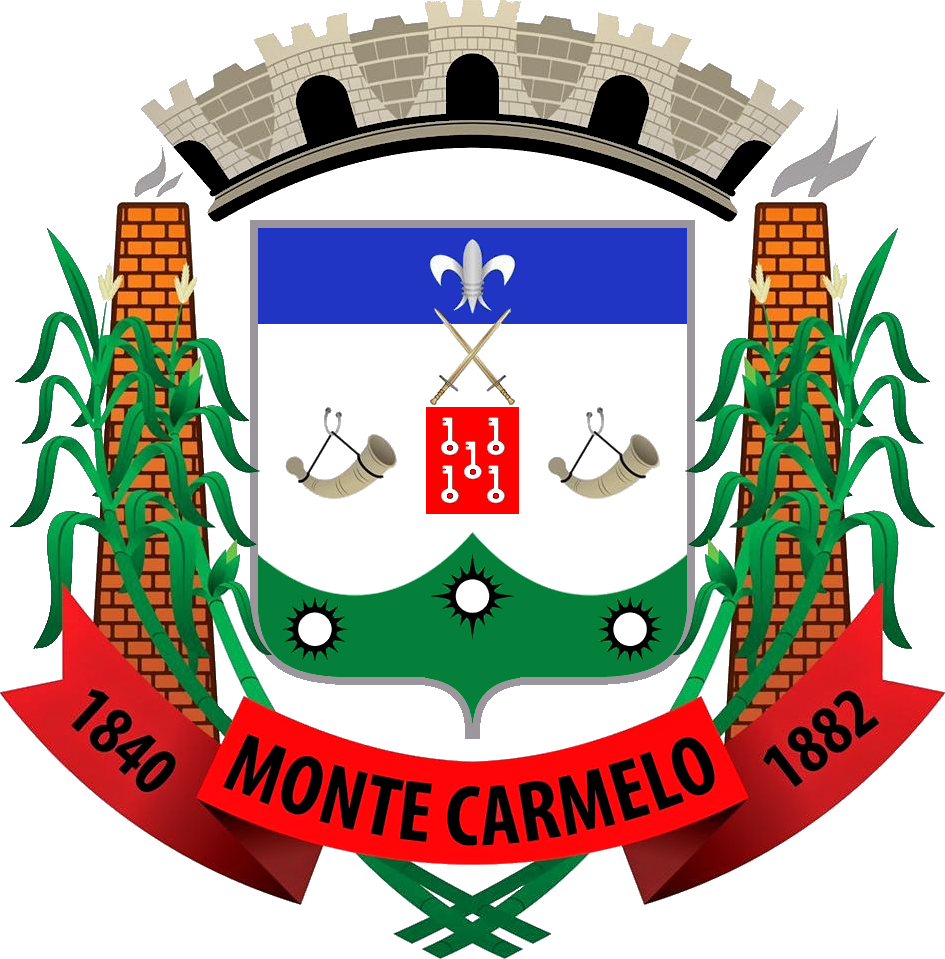
- Flag Coat of arms

- Location in Minas Gerais

- Location in Brazil
- Coordinates: 18.73°S 47.50°W
- Country: Brazil
- Region: Southeast
- State: Minas Gerais
- Intermediate region: Uberlândia
- Immediate region: Monte Carmelo
- Established as a municipality: 6 October 1882
- Installed: 7 January 1889
- City status: 24 May 1892
- Districts: Monte Carmelo, Celso Bueno

Government
  - Mayor: Ricardo Ferreira (2025–2028) (PSD)

Area
  - Total: 1,343.035 km^{2} (518.549 sq mi)
- Elevation: 890 m (2,920 ft)

Population (2022)
  - Total: 47,692
  - Estimate (2025): 49,500
  - Density: 35.511/km^{2} (91.972/sq mi)
- Demonym: carmelitano

Socioeconomic indicators
  - HDI (2010): 0.728
  - GDP per capita (2023): R$41,037.50
- Time zone: UTC−3 (BRT)
- Postal code: 38500-000
- Area code: 34
- Website: www.montecarmelo.mg.gov.br

Monte Carmelo is a municipality in western Minas Gerais, Brazil. It belongs to the Immediate Geographic Region of Monte Carmelo and the Intermediate Geographic Region of Uberlândia. The municipality covers 1,343.035 km^{2} (518.549 sq mi). Its population was 47,692 in the 2022 census and was estimated at 49,500 in 2025.

The municipality was created as Nossa Senhora do Carmo da Bagagem on 6 October 1882 and installed on 7 January 1889. Its seat received city status in 1892, and the municipality adopted the name Monte Carmelo in 1900. It consists of the districts of Monte Carmelo and Celso Bueno. The Federal University of Uberlândia operates one of its campuses in the municipality.

== History ==
Carmo da Bagagem was established as a district in 1870 under the municipality of Bagagem, now Estrela do Sul. Provincial Law No. 2,927 created the municipality of Nossa Senhora do Carmo da Bagagem and elevated its seat to a vila on 6 October 1882. The municipality was installed on 7 January 1889. Its seat became a city on 24 May 1892, and State Law No. 286 changed the municipality's name to Monte Carmelo on 25 June 1900.

Douradoquara, Iraí de Minas, and Romaria were separated from Monte Carmelo in 1962 to form new municipalities. In the 2022 territorial division, Monte Carmelo consisted of the districts of Monte Carmelo and Celso Bueno.

== Education ==
The Federal University of Uberlândia's Monte Carmelo campus offers undergraduate programs in agronomy, surveying and cartographic engineering, forestry engineering, geology, and information systems.

== Notable people ==
- Mário Palmério, writer, educator, and politician

== See also ==
- List of municipalities in Minas Gerais
