= Alto Paranaíba =

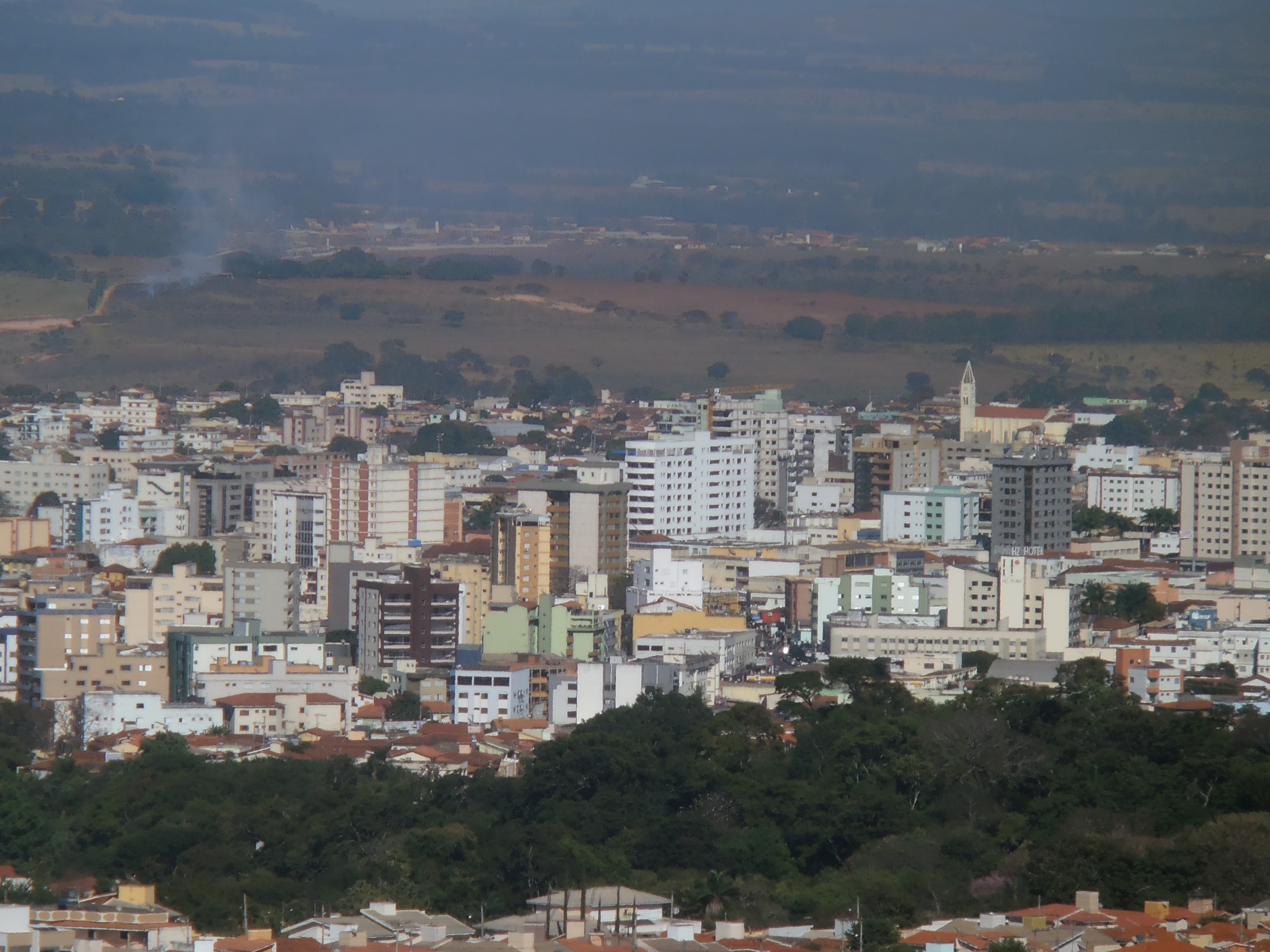
Panoramic view of Patos de Minas, the most populated city in Alto Paranaíba.

Alto Paranaíba is one of the ten planning regions of the state of Minas Gerais in Brazil.

Paranaiba is bordered:

- to the north and northeast by the north region of Minas Gerais
- to the east by Jequitinhonha-Mucuri
- to the southeast by the central region of Minas Gerais
- to the southwest by the central West region of Minas Gerais
- to the west by the northwest region of Minas Gerais
