= Araguari =

- Municipality
- Municipality of Araguari
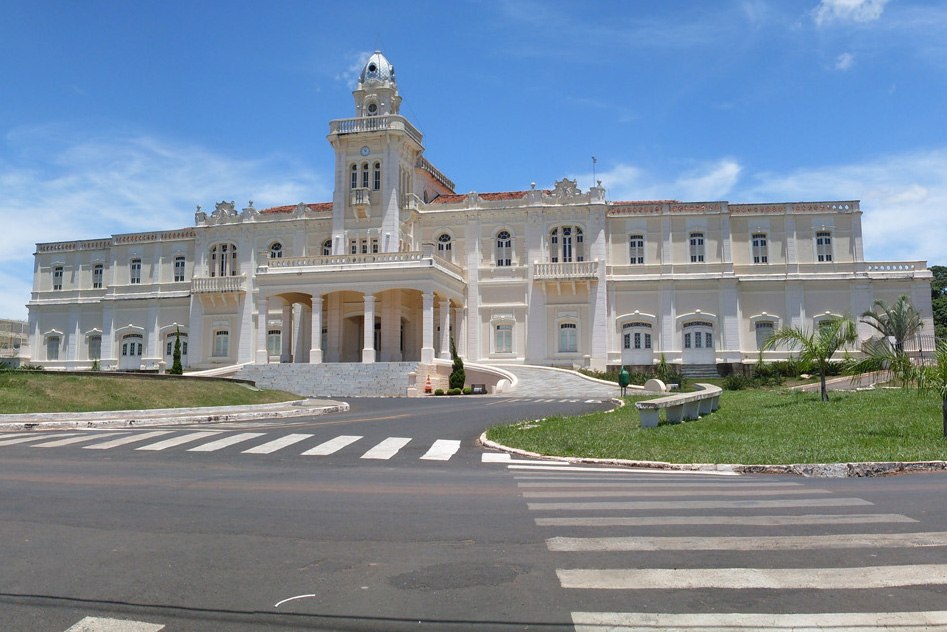

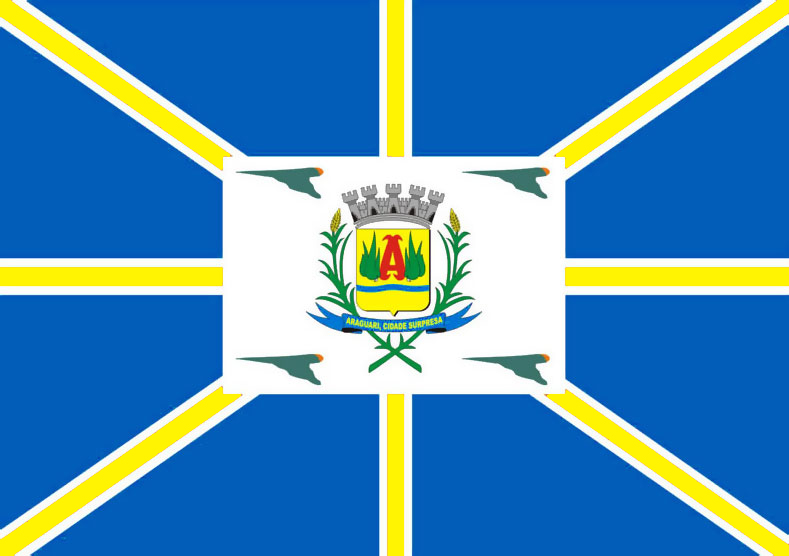
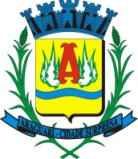
- Flag Coat of arms
- Nickname: Cidade Sorriso
- Location in Minas Gerais

- Location in Brazil
- Coordinates: 18°38′56″S 48°11′13″W
- Country: Brazil
- Region: Southeast
- State: Minas Gerais
- Founded: 1888

Government
  - Mayor: Renato Carvalho Fernandes

Area
  - Total: 2,730.632 km^{2} (1,054.303 sq mi)
- Elevation: 1,013 m (3,323 ft)

Population (2025)
  - Total: 123,432
  - Density: 45.2027/km^{2} (117.075/sq mi)
- Time zone: UTC−3 (BRT)
- HDI (2010): 0.773 – high
- Website: www.araguari.mg.gov.br

Araguari is a municipality in western Minas Gerais state, Brazil. It is in the northern Triângulo Mineiro region, on the Jordão River, a tributary of the Paranaíba River, at an elevation between 940 and 1,087 metres (3,084 and 3,566 ft). The municipality of Araguari has an area of 2,774 km^{2} (1,071 sq mi), with 54 km^{2} (21 sq mi) in the urban zone and 2,675 km^{2} (1,033 sq mi) in the rural zone. The population in 2020 was 117,825, making it the third-most important city in the Triângulo Mineiro, after Uberlândia and Uberaba. Araguari has also been one of the fastest-growing cities in Brazil, growing more than the rest of the country in proportion.

== Geography ==
=== Rivers ===
Rivers that water the municipality are Rio Araguari, Ribeirão das Araras, Corrego Grande, Ribeirão Jordão, and Ribeirão Piçarrão. The Paranaíba in the north forms the boundary with the state of Goiás. There are many waterfalls and rapids (128 according to one source), giving the area a great potential in tourism.

=== Climate ===
The year is divided into two periods, the rainy season from November to April and the dry season from May to October. Because of the elevation (more than 1,000 meters above sea level) temperatures are pleasant with few extremes although humidity can be high in the rainy season.

- Annual average temperature: 20.7 °C (69.3 °F)
- Maximum annual average: 26.3 °C (79.3 °F)
- Minimum annual average: 16 °C (61 °F)
- Annual average rainfall: 1,484 mm (58.4 in)

=== Distances from major cities ===
- Belo Horizonte 569 km (354 mi)
- Rio de Janeiro 1,000 km (620 mi)
- São Paulo 623 km (387 mi)
- Brasília 397 km (247 mi).

=== Main highways serving the municipality ===
- BR-050 - São Paulo - Brasília: allows for south/center-west integration, and connecting with the Belém/Brasília reaches the north of the country.
- MG-223 - Allows for the integration of the region of the Triângulo Mineiro with the capital of the state, Belo Horizonte, connecting with BR-365 and with BR 050.
- MG-413 - It connects Araguari with Goiânia and all the center-west of the country.
- MG-748 - It connects Araguari to BR-365, interconnecting with the north of Minas Gerais as far as Montes Claros.

Araguari is a major railroad junction and connects with the states of Goiás, Tocantins, and Mato Grosso do Sul.

== Demographics ==
- Total population in 2013: 114,525
- Urban population: 103,001
- Population in 1960: 52,191
- Population in 1970: 63,368
- Population in 1980: 83,523
- Population in 1991: 91,428
- Population in 2000: 101,974

== Economy ==
Araguari's main source of income is from the large herds of cattle raised in the hinterlands, where rice, soybeans, corn (maize), citrus fruits, tomatoes, beans, and manioc are also cultivated. In recent years the region has become one of the most important coffee-growing areas in the country and there is an annual coffee fair. Araguari has 9 financial institutions. There is an industrial park with several industries specializing in metallurgy, agro-industrial products (cold meats and juices) and storage facilities for grains. In the last few years Araguari has been changing rapidly and receiving many important investments as Selecta which produces soy bean oils and accounts more than 500 new jobs. The city also received the biggest rail trainshipment in Latin America. Now Araguari is lacking of workers to work in the many new jobs offers.

=== Occupation of the population by sectors ===
- Agriculture: 7,280
- Industry: 13,032
- Commerce: 4,451
- Transport, communication, and storage: 2,392
- Other services: 14,107

=== Enterprises ===
- Total number in 2007: 3,882 units
- Wholesale commerce: 241 units
- Retail commerce: 1,762 units
- Industrial: 468 units employing 5,459 workers in 2005
- Construction: 54 units employing 2,663 workers
- Commerce, vehicle repair, personal and domestic objects: 2,048 units employing 3,773 workers
- Restaurants and hotels: 205 units employing 711 workers
- Transportation, storage, and communications: 268 units employing 1,095 workers
- Real estate, rents, and services to companies: 426 units with 1,138 workers
- Public administration, defense, and social security: 20 units with 1,881 workers
- Education: 57 units with 817 workers
- Other collective, social and personal services: 268 units with 1,246 workers

=== Farm data for 2006 ===
Most of the rural properties have between 01 and 50 hectares. If we add to this group those properties between 51 and 100 hectares then we reach 72% of the total.

- Number of farms: 1,164
- Agricultural area: 154,240
- Area of permanent crops: 52,974 ha.
- Area of perennial crops: 24,936
- Area of natural pasture: 48,749
- Workers related to the producer: 2,459
- Workers not related to the producer: 1,765

=== Main permanent crops in planted area in 2006 ===
- Banana: 130 ha.
- Rubber (coagulated latex): 97 ha.
- Coffee: 8,500 ha.
- Coconut: 75 ha.
- Oranges: 20 ha.
- Papaya: 20 ha.
- Passion fruit: 450 ha.
- Hearts of palm: 61 ha.

=== Main perennial crops in planted area in 2006 ===
- Garlic: 238 ha.
- Rice: 100 ha.
- Beans: 310 ha.
- Manioc: 238 ha.
- Corn: 14,000 ha.
- Soybeans: 17,500 ha.
- Tomatoes: 423 ha.
- Wheat: 156 ha.

=== Livestock raising in 2006 ===
- Number of cattle: 79,643 head raised by 1,232 producers
- Number of poultry: 1,593.370 head
- Number of swine: 39,033 head

== Health and education ==
- Infant mortality rate: 22.55 (1998)
- Literacy rate in 2000: 95.6%
- Hospitals: 4 private and 1 philanthropic with 360 beds
- Public Health centers 15 with 54 doctors 34 dentists, and 9 psychologists (2002)
- Private clinics: 22 with 112 doctors and 115 dentists
- Primary schools: 46 with 16,000 students
- Middle and secondary schools: 16 with 5,397 students
- Higher education: 2 schools with 2,560 students in 2005 offering 6
- Municipal Human Development Index: 815

== Culture ==
There is a theater with capacity to seat 120 persons. The sports center seats 5,000 spectators. In the urban area there is a tropical forest, the Bosque John Kennedy, with an area of 112,000 square meters. There is a movie theater "Cinema Odete" and also a public theater located in the city center "Cine Teatro".

== Tourism ==
On the northern boundary of the municipality is a complex of hydroelectric power stations (Emborcação and Miranda), which form several lakes. In addition to the energy supplied, they are also tourist attractions, providing spaces for fishing and the practice of water sports.

== History ==
Settlement began in the first decades of the nineteenth century. Brejo Alegre was the name of the small village (arraial) composed of some buildings, among them a small chapel, simple houses, a few stores, and a lot of cattle ranches. In 1843 the village was raised to the status of district with the name of Sant’Ana do Rio das Velhas.

In 1882 the district was declared a "vila" (town) and in 1888 it was raised to the category of "cidade" or city, with the new name of Araguari. At this time the town consisted of the Igreja Matriz (Main church) of Senhor Bom Jesus da Cana Verde with its colonial style; the cemetery located behind the church; the houses with tiles but no ceilings, called casas de “telhas ao vento”; and in the center flowed a stream dividing the settlement, one part called Goiás, and the other, Minas. The small commerce consisted of a bakery, a shoe store, two pharmacies and some general stores, called “vendas”.

The great change in the town's situation occurred with the arrival of the railroad, the Cia. Mogiana de Estrada de Ferro, in 1896. In 1906 this railroad, called Estrada de Ferro Goiás, was extended to Goiás, further increasing the growth of the city.

Partial view of the downtown

== See also ==
- List of municipalities in Minas Gerais

== External links (in Portuguese) ==
- lista telefonica de Araguari
- Site with useful information
