= Triângulo Mineiro =

Region in western Minas Gerais

The Triângulo Mineiro ([tɾiˈɐ̃ɡulu miˈnejru], Mineiro Triangle) is the region that comprises the west part of the state of Minas Gerais, in Brazil.

It occupies an area of 93,500 km^{2} (slightly larger than Portugal or Hungary) and is bordered to the east by Serra da Canastra (Canastra Mountains), to the south by state of São Paulo, to the north by the state of Goiás, and to the west by the junction of the Rio Grande and Paranaíba rivers. The name of the region ''The Minas Gerais Triangle'', means that the junction of these two rivers resembles a triangle.

It is one of the most developed regions in the country, within an environment of high water quality resources, and agricultural environmental conditions allowing sustainable research and development center, being good places for research and development studies in tech / science fields.

Home of three of the most renowned and prolific cities in the state: Uberlândia, Uberaba and Patos de Minas. Holding good results and awarded in the surveys carried out in Brazil regarding topics related to living standards, local initiatives, business, and career.

Economy is actually well-diversified. As in other Brazilian locations with climate and similar environment: Agribusinesses, Meat, coffee, corn, soybeans, and sugarcane. Other activities are wholesale commerce and telecommunications. Many large multinationals and domestic companies have invested in the region of Triangulo. .

The region is famous for Agricultural trade shows: Expozebu (Uberaba), Fenamilho (Patos de Minas) and Feniub (Uberlândia).

Triângulo Mineiro e Alto Paranaíba is one of the twelve mesoregions of the Brazilian state of Minas Gerais. It is composed of 66 municipalities distributed across 7 microregions.

== Paleontology ==
The role of Paleontology in the region was very important after discovered fossils of Maxakalisaurus topai (Dinoprata), a genus of titanosaurus found 45 kilometers (28 mi) from Prata in 1998. It was closely related to Saltasaurus, considered unusual because it had evolved apparently defensive traits having bony plates on the skin and vertical plates in the spine. Osteoderms have also been found for Maxakalisaurus.

The genus name comes from the tribe of the Maxakali, and Topa is one of their divinities.

The Maxakalisaurus fossils belonged to an animal about 13 meters (43.3 ft.) long, with an estimated weight of 9 tons, although according to paleontologist Alexander Kellner, it could reach a length of approximately 20 meters (65 ft.). It had a long neck and tail, ridged teeth (unusual among sauropods) and lived about 80 million years ago. Because sauropods seem to have lacked significant competition in South America, they evolved having greater diversity and more unusual traits than elsewhere. It is exposed at the National Museum of Brazil in Rio de Janeiro since August 28, 2006.

== Major cities ==
All include the total municipality population (2021):

- Uberlândia - 706.597
- Uberaba - 340.277
- Patos de Minas - 154.641
- Araguari - 118.361
- Ituiutaba - 105.818
- Araxá - 108.403
- Patrocínio - 92.116

== See also ==
- Federal University of Triângulo Mineiro
